= List of settlements in Iași County =

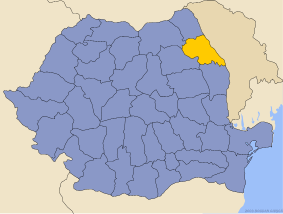
Iași County in Romania

This is a list of settlements in Iași County, Romania.

The following are the county's cities and towns, along with their attached villages:

City/Town	Villages
Iași	
Pașcani	Blăgești, Boșteni, Gâstești, Lunca, Sodomeni
Hârlău	Pârcovaci
Podu Iloaiei	Budăi, Cosițeni, Holm, Scobâlțeni
Târgu Frumos	

The following are the county's communes, with component villages:

Commune	Villages
Alexandru Ioan Cuza	Alexandru Ioan Cuza, Kogălniceni, Șcheia, Volintirești
Andrieșeni	Andrieșeni, Buhăeni, Drăgănești, Fântânele, Glăvănești, Iepureni, Spineni
Aroneanu	Aroneanu, Dorobanț, Rediu Aldei, Șorogari
Balș	Balș, Boureni, Coasta Măgurii
Bălțați	Bălțați, Cotârgaci, Filiași, Mădârjești, Podișu, Sârca, Valea Oilor
Bârnova	Bârnova, Cercu, Păun, Pietrăria, Todirel, Vișan
Belcești	Belcești, Liteni, Munteni, Satu Nou, Tansa, Ulmi
Bivolari	Bivolari, Buruienești, Soloneț, Tabăra, Traian
Brăești	Brăești, Albești, Buda, Cristești, Rediu
Butea	Butea, Miclăușeni
Ceplenița	Ceplenița, Buhalnița, Poiana Mărului, Zlodica
Ciohorăni	Ciohorăni
Ciortești	Ciortești, Coropceni, Deleni, Rotăria, Șerbești
Ciurea	Ciurea, Curături, Dumbrava, Hlincea, Lunca Cetățuii, Picioru Lupului, Slobozia
Coarnele Caprei	Coarnele Caprei, Arama, Petroșica
Comarna	Comarna, Curagău, Osoi, Stânca
Costești	Costești, Giurgești
Costuleni	Costuleni, Covasna, Cozia, Hilița
Cotnari	Cotnari, Bahluiu, Cârjoaia, Cireșeni, Făgăt, Hodora, Horodiștea, Iosupeni, Lupăria, Valea Racului, Zbereni
Cozmești	Cozmești, Podolenii de Jos, Podolenii de Sus
Cristești	Cristești, Homița
Cucuteni	Cucuteni, Băiceni, Bărbătești, Săcărești
Dagâța	Dagâța, Bălușești, Boatca, Buzdug, Mănăstirea, Piscu Rusului, Poienile, Tarnița, Zece Prăjini
Deleni	Deleni, Feredeni, Leahu-Nacu, Maxut, Poiana, Slobozia
Dobrovăț	Dobrovăț-Moldoveni, Dobrovăț-Ruși, Pahonia
Dolhești	Dolhești, Brădicești, Pietriș
Drăgușeni	Drăgușeni, Frenciugi
Dumești	Dumești, Banu, Chilișoaia, Hoisești, Păușești
Erbiceni	Erbiceni, Bârlești, Spinoasa, Sprânceana, Totoești
Fântânele	Fântânele
Focuri	Focuri
Golăiești	Golăiești, Bran, Cilibiu, Cotu lui Ivan, Grădinari, Medeleni, Petrești, Podu Jijiei
Gorban	Gorban, Gura Bohotin, Podu Hagiului, Scoposeni, Zberoaia
Grajduri	Grajduri, Cărbunari, Corcodel, Lunca, Pădureni, Poiana cu Cetate, Valea Satului
Gropnița	Gropnița, Bulbucani, Forăști, Mălăești, Săveni, Sângeri
Grozești	Grozești, Colțu Cornii, Sălăgeni
Hălăucești	Hălăucești, Luncași
Hărmănești	Boldești, Hărmăneștii Noi, Hărmăneștii Vechi
Heleșteni	Heleșteni, Hărmăneasa, Movileni, Oboroceni
Holboca	Holboca, Cristești, Dancu, Orzeni, Rusenii Noi, Rusenii Vechi, Valea Lungă
Horlești	Horlești, Bogdănești, Scoposeni
Ion Neculce	Ion Neculce, Buznea, Dădești, Gănești, Prigoreni, Războieni
Ipatele	Ipatele, Alexești, Bâcu, Cuza Vodă
Lespezi	Lespezi, Buda, Bursuc-Deal, Bursuc-Vale, Dumbrava, Heci
Lețcani	Lețcani, Bogonos, Cogeasca, Cucuteni
Lungani	Lungani, Crucea, Goești, Zmeu
Mădârjac	Mădârjac, Bojila, Frumușica
Mircești	Mircești, Iugani
Mironeasa	Mironeasa, Schitu Hadâmbului, Urșița
Miroslava	Miroslava, Balciu, Brătuleni, Ciurbești, Cornești, Dancaș, Găureni, Horpaz, Proselnici, Uricani, Valea Adâncă, Valea Ursului, Vorovești
Miroslovești	Miroslovești, Mitești, Soci, Verșeni
Mogoșești	Mogoșești, Budești, Hadâmbu, Mânjești
Mogoșești-Siret	Mogoșești-Siret, Muncelu de Sus, Tudor Vladimirescu
Moșna	Moșna
Moțca	Moțca, Boureni
Movileni	Movileni, Iepureni, Larga-Jijia, Potângeni
Oțeleni	Oțeleni, Hândrești
Plugari	Plugari, Boroșoaia, Onești
Popești	Popești, Doroșcani, Hărpășești, Obrijeni, Pădureni, Vama
Popricani	Popricani, Cârlig, Cotu Morii, Cuza Vodă, Moimești, Rediu Mitropoliei, Țipilești, Vânători, Vulturi
Prisăcani	Prisăcani, Măcărești, Moreni
Probota	Probota, Bălteni, Perieni
Răchiteni	Răchiteni, Izvoarele, Ursărești
Răducăneni	Răducăneni, Bohotin, Isaiia, Roșu
Rediu	Rediu, Breazu, Horlești, Tăutești
Românești	Românești, Avântu, Ursoaia
Roșcani	Roșcani, Rădeni
Ruginoasa	Ruginoasa, Dumbrăvița, Rediu, Vascani
Scânteia	Scânteia, Bodești, Boroșești, Ciocârlești, Lunca Rateș, Rediu, Tufeștii de Sus
Schitu Duca	Schitu Duca, Blaga, Dumitreștii Gălății, Pocreaca, Poiana, Poieni, Satu Nou, Slobozia
Scobinți	Scobinți, Bădeni, Fetești, Sticlăria, Zagavia
Sinești	Sinești, Bocnița, Osoi, Stornești
Sirețel	Sirețel, Berezlogi, Humosu, Satu Nou, Slobozia
Stolniceni-Prăjescu	Stolniceni-Prăjescu, Brătești, Cozmești
Strunga	Strunga, Brătulești, Crivești, Cucova, Fărcășeni, Fedeleșeni, Gura Văii, Hăbășești
Șcheia	Șcheia, Căuești, Cioca-Boca, Poiana Șcheii, Satu Nou
Șipote	Șipote, Chișcăreni, Hălceni, Iazu Nou, Iazu Vechi, Mitoc
Tansa	Tansa, Suhuleț
Tătăruși	Tătăruși, Iorcani, Pietrosu, Uda, Vâlcica
Todirești	Todirești, Băiceni, Stroești
Tomești	Tomești, Chicerea, Goruni, Vlădiceni
Trifești	Trifești, Hermeziu, Vladomira, Zaboloteni
Țibana	Țibana, Alexeni, Domnița, Gârbești, Moara Ciornei, Oproaia, Poiana Mănăstirii, Poiana de Sus, Runcu, Vadu Vejei
Țibănești	Țibănești, Glodenii Gândului, Griești, Jigoreni, Răsboieni, Recea, Tungujei, Vălenii
Țigănași	Țigănași, Cârniceni, Mihail Kogălniceanu, Stejarii
Țuțora	Țuțora, Chiperești, Oprișeni
Ungheni	Ungheni, Bosia, Coada Stâncii, Mânzătești
Valea Lupului	Valea Lupului
Valea Seacă	Valea Seacă, Conțești, Topile
Vânători	Vânători, Crivești, Gura Bâdiliței, Hârtoape, Vlădnicuț
Victoria	Victoria, Frăsuleni, Icușeni, Luceni, Sculeni, Stânca, Șendreni
Vlădeni	Vlădeni, Alexandru cel Bun, Borșa, Broșteni, Iacobeni, Vâlcelele
Voinești	Voinești, Lungani, Schitu Stavnic, Slobozia, Vocotești
