= Dolhești =

Dolhești may refer to several places in Romania:

- Dolhești, Iași, a commune in Iași County
- Dolhești, Suceava, a commune in Suceava County
- Dolhești, a village in Pipirig Commune, Neamț County
