= Hadâmbu Monastery =

Monastery in Iași County, Romania

Coordinates: 47.0110816°N 27.4291706°E

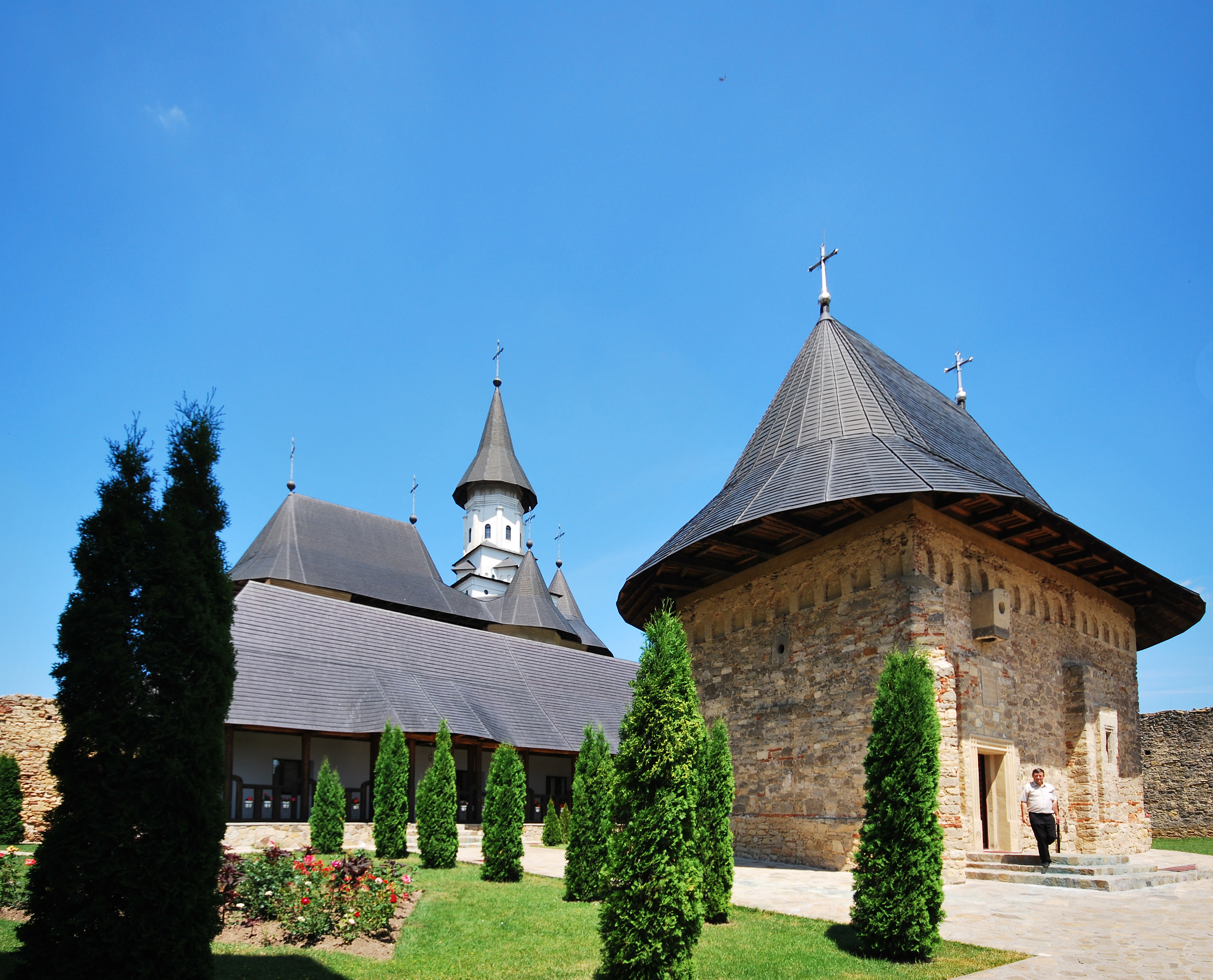

Religion
- Affiliation: Romanian Orthodox Church

Location
- Location: Schitu Hadâmbului, Iași County, Romania
- Interactive map of Hadâmbu Monastery

Architecture
- Style: Moldavian
- Completed: 1659
- Materials: stone, brick

The Hadâmbu Monastery (Romanian: Mănăstirea Hadâmbu) is a Romanian Orthodox monastery located in Schitu Hadâmbului, Iași County, Romania.

Located 30 km (19 mi) southwest of the city of Iași, the monastery, dedicated in 1659, was built by the Greek cellarer Iani Hadâmbul on a place donated to him by Prince Gheorghe Ghica. Left in ruin for many years, the monastery was reopened in 1990.

The monastery is listed in the National Register of Historic Monuments.

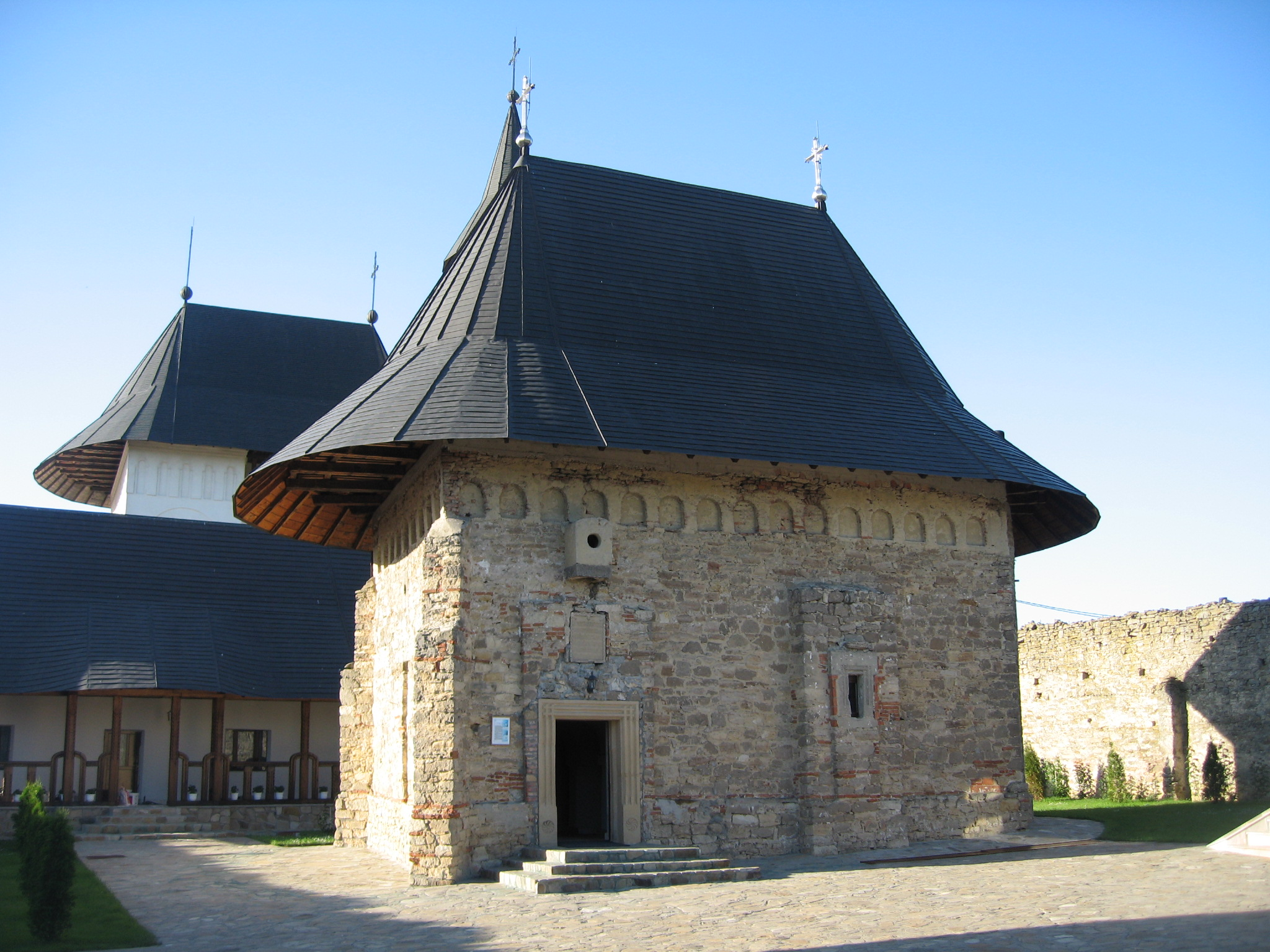
The old church

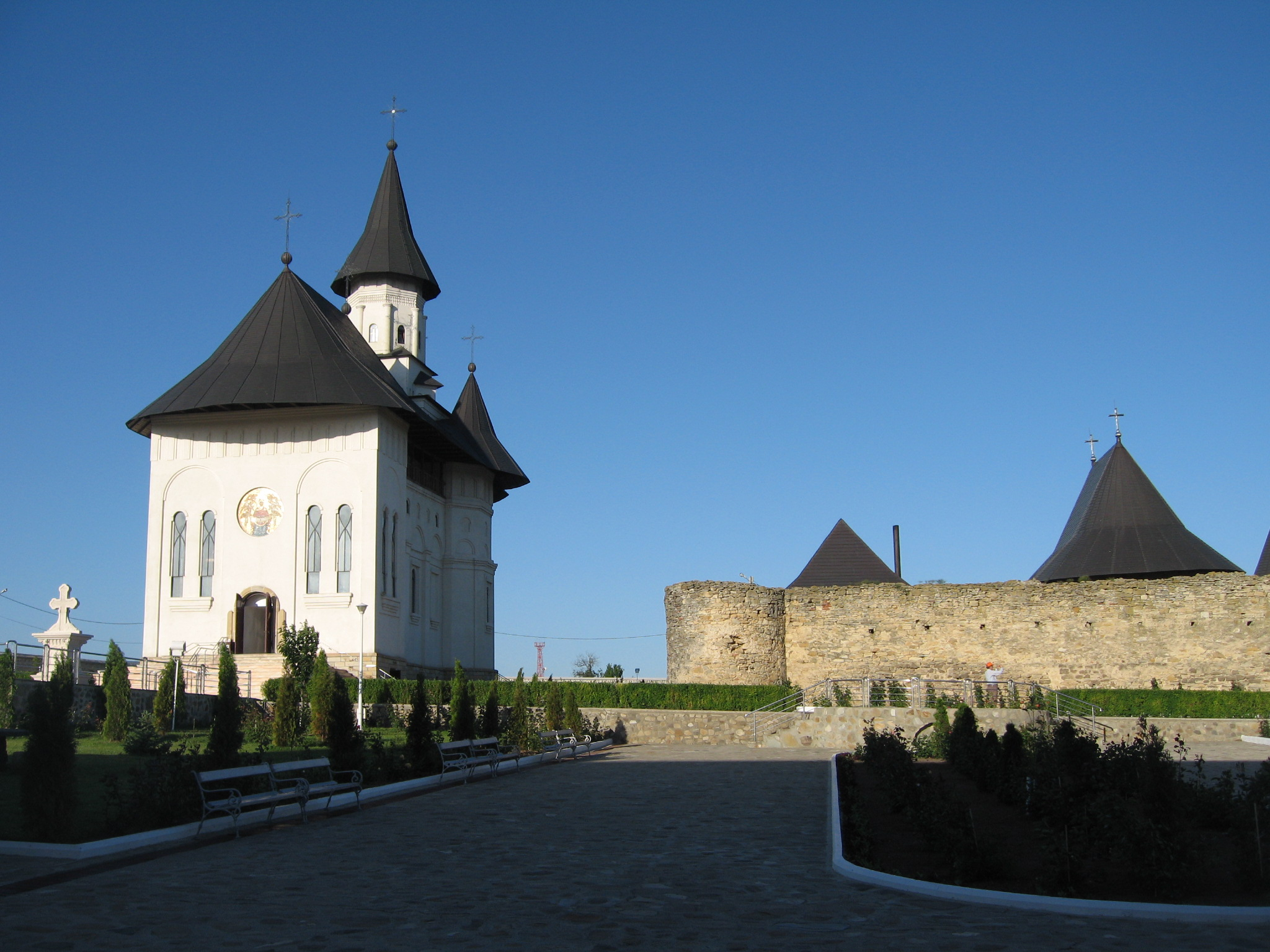
The new church
