= Vama =

Vama may refer to:

- Vama, Satu Mare, a commune in Satu Mare County, Romania
- Vama, Suceava, a commune in Suceava County, Romania
- Vama, a village in Popeşti Commune, Iaşi County, Romania
- Vama, the Romanian name for Radhospivka village, Tsuren Commune, Hertsa Raion, Ukraine
- VAMA, ICAO code for Mundra Airport, India
- VAMA, the Vietnam Automobile Manufacturers' Association, see Automotive industry in Vietnam
