= Fântânele, Iași =

Fântânele
- Commune
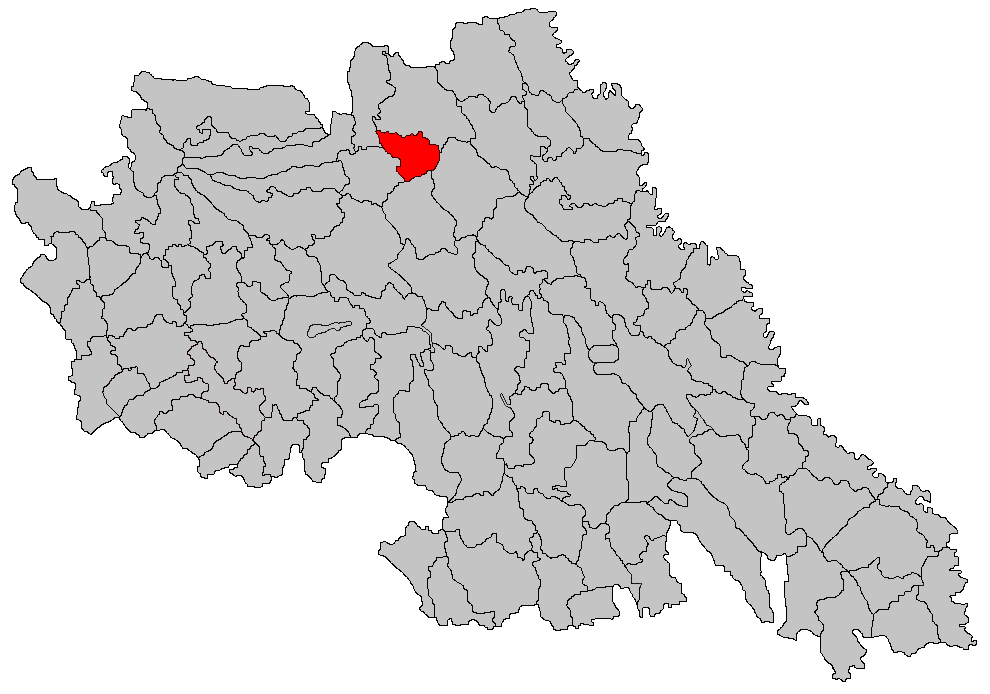
- Location in Iași County

- Location in Romania
- Coordinates: 47°25′N 27°11′E
- Country: Romania
- County: Iași

Government
  - Mayor (2024–2028): Sorin Chelariu (PSD)
- Area: 32.85 km^{2} (12.68 sq mi)
- Elevation: 123 m (404 ft)
- Population (2021-12-01): 1,986
  - Density: 60.46/km^{2} (156.6/sq mi)
- Time zone: UTC+02:00 (EET)
  - Summer (DST): UTC+03:00 (EEST)
- Postal code: 707196
- Area code: +40 x32
- Vehicle reg.: IS
- Website: comunafantaneleiasi.ro

Fântânele is a commune in Iași County, Western Moldavia, Romania. It is composed of a single village, Fântânele.
