= Mădârjac =

- Commune
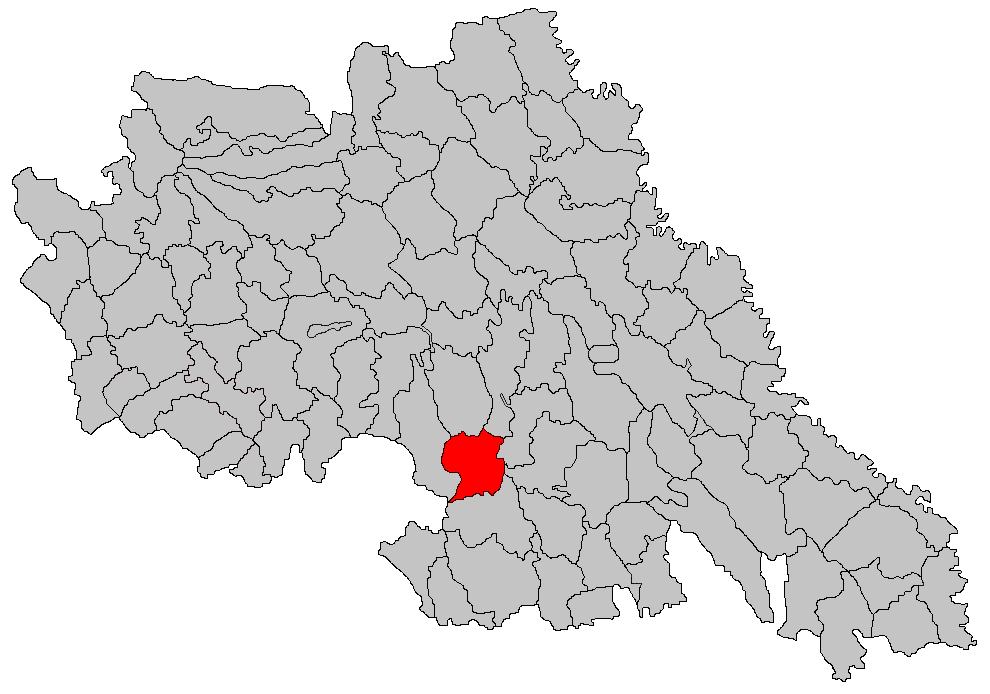
- Location in Iași County

- Location in Romania
- Coordinates: 47°3′N 27°15′E
- Country: Romania
- County: Iași
- Subdivisions: Mădârjac, Bojila, Frumușica

Government
  - Mayor (2024–2028): Dan Ghebuță (PSD)
- Area: 52.63 km^{2} (20.32 sq mi)
- Elevation: 188 m (617 ft)
- Population (2021-12-01): 1,556
  - Density: 30/km^{2} (77/sq mi)
- Time zone: EET/EEST (UTC+2/+3)
- Postal code: 707290
- Area code: +(40) x32
- Vehicle reg.: IS
- Website: www.comunamadarjac.ro

Mădârjac is a commune in Iași County, Western Moldavia, Romania. It is composed of three villages: Bojila, Frumușica and Mădârjac.
