= Coarnele Caprei =

- Commune
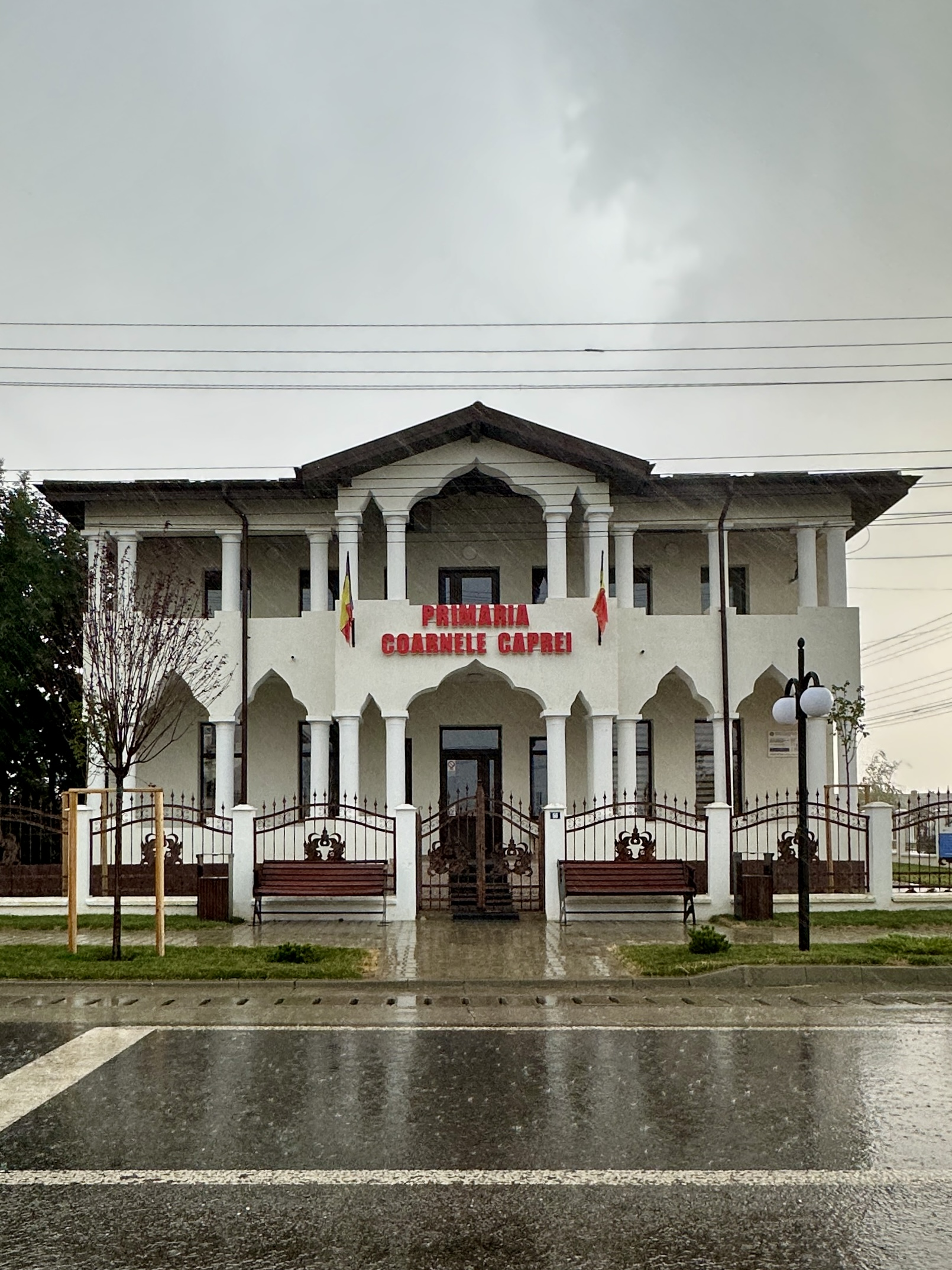
- Coarnele Caprei town hall

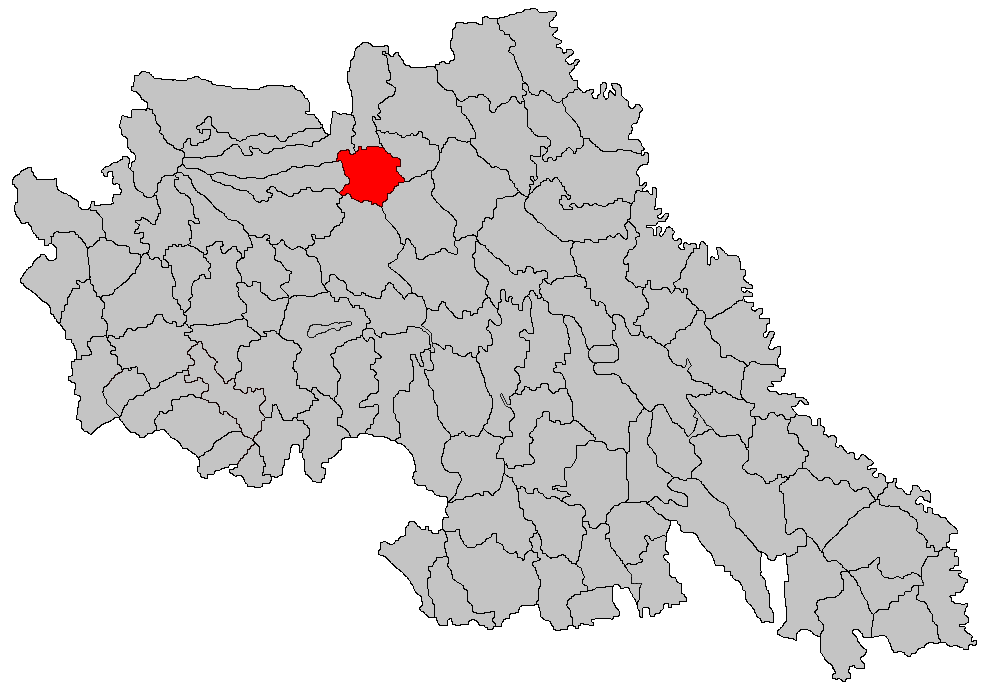
- Location in Iași County

- Location in Romania
- Coordinates: 47°23′N 27°6′E
- Country: Romania
- County: Iași

Government
  - Mayor (2020–2024): Mihai Țibucanu (PNL)
- Area: 44.34 km^{2} (17.12 sq mi)
- Elevation: 123 m (404 ft)
- Population (2021-12-01): 2,438
  - Density: 54.98/km^{2} (142.4/sq mi)
- Time zone: UTC+02:00 (EET)
  - Summer (DST): UTC+03:00 (EEST)
- Postal code: 707100
- Area code: +(40) 232
- Vehicle reg.: IS
- Website: coarnelecaprei.ro

Coarnele Caprei is a commune in Iași County, Western Moldavia, Romania. It is composed of three villages: Arama, Coarnele Caprei, and Petroșica.

The commune is located in the northern part of the county, 52 km (32 mi) northwest of the county seat, Iași.

Historical population
| Year | Pop. | ±% |
|---|---|---|
| 1912 | 2,338 | — |
| 1941 | 3,270 | +39.9% |
| 1956 | 3,750 | +14.7% |
| 1992 | 3,012 | −19.7% |
| 2002 | 3,112 | +3.3% |
| 2011 | 3,091 | −0.7% |
| 2021 | 2,438 | −21.1% |
Source: Census data
