= Țigănași =

- Commune
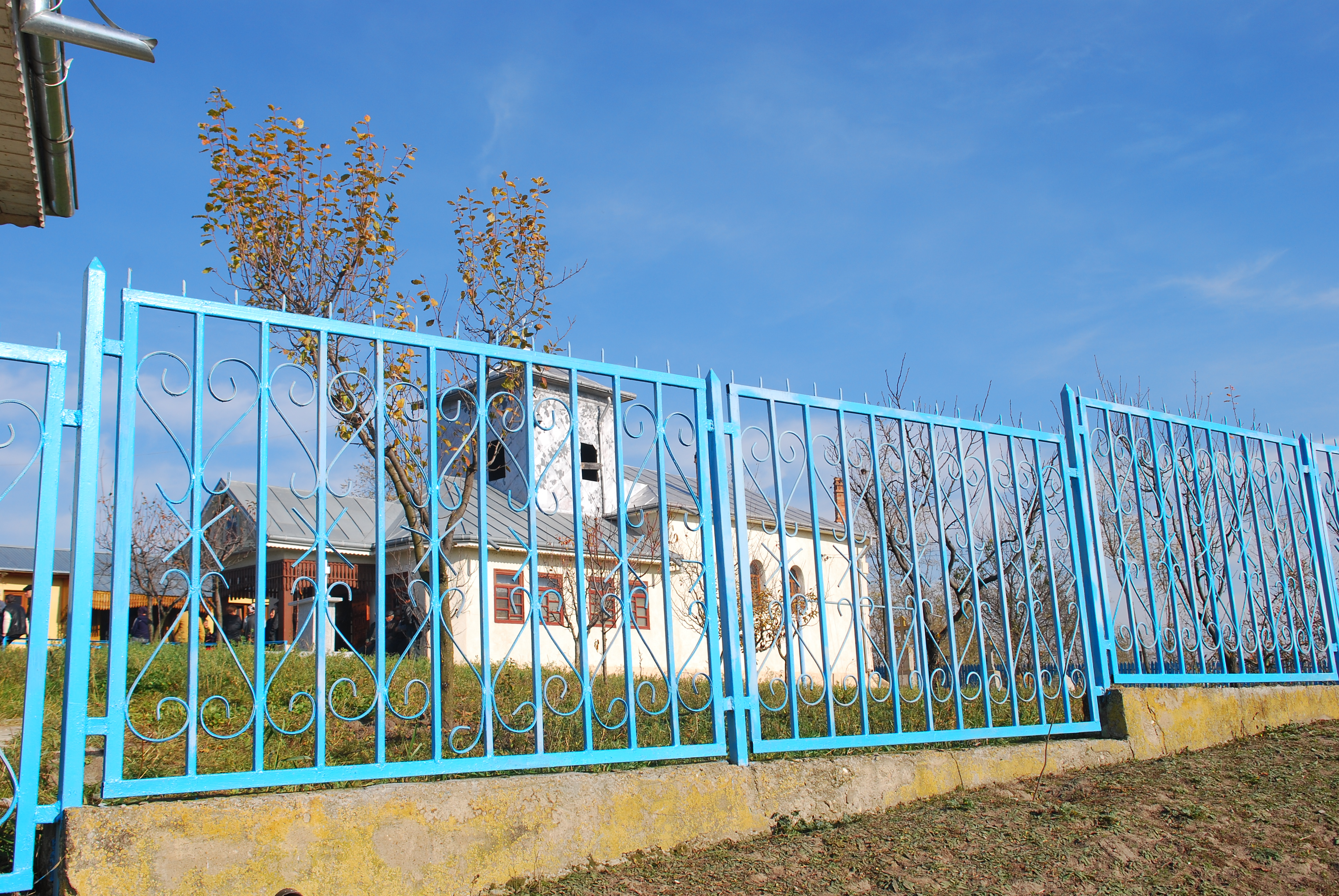
- Saint Charalambos Church in Cârniceni

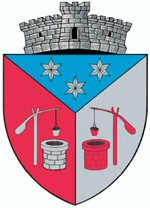
- Coat of arms

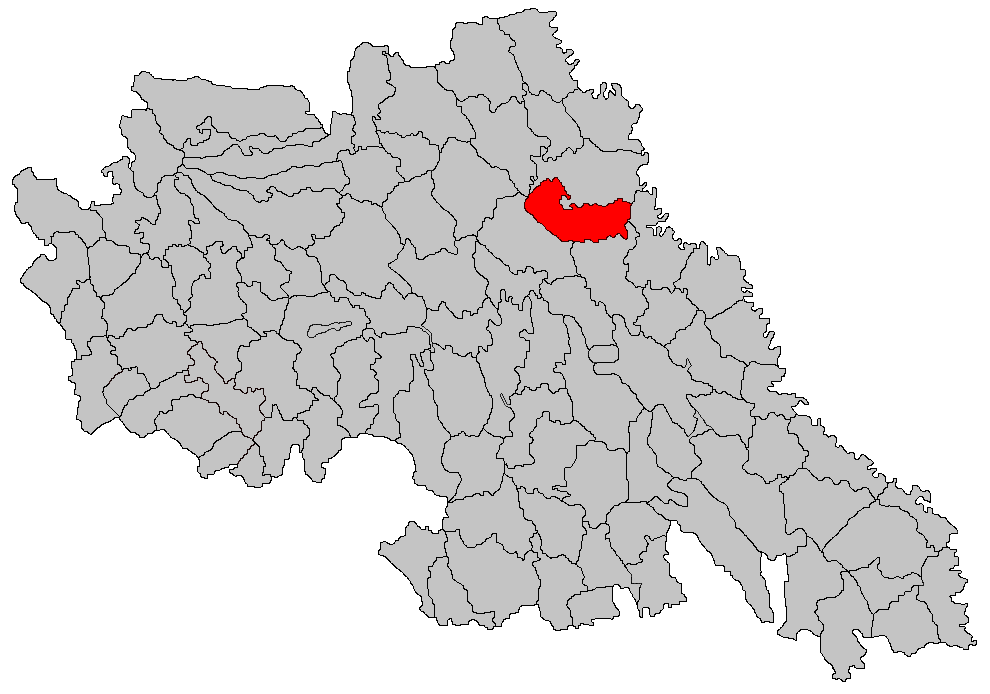
- Location in Iași County

- Location in Romania
- Coordinates: 47°20′N 27°28′E
- Country: Romania
- County: Iași

Government
  - Mayor (2024–2028): Iulian Chirilă (PSD)
- Area: 64.4 km^{2} (24.9 sq mi)
- Elevation: 73 m (240 ft)
- Population (2021-12-01): 4,114
  - Density: 63.9/km^{2} (165/sq mi)
- Time zone: UTC+02:00 (EET)
  - Summer (DST): UTC+03:00 (EEST)
- Postal code: 707555
- Area code: +(40) 02 32
- Vehicle reg.: IS
- Website: www.primariatiganasi.ro

Țigănași is a commune in Iași County, Western Moldavia, Romania. It is composed of four villages: Cârniceni, Mihail Kogălniceanu, Stejarii, and Țigănași.

The commune is located in the northeastern part of the county, on the banks of the Jijia River.

== Natives ==
- Costache Antoniu (1900–1979), stage and film actor
