= Gropnița =

- Commune
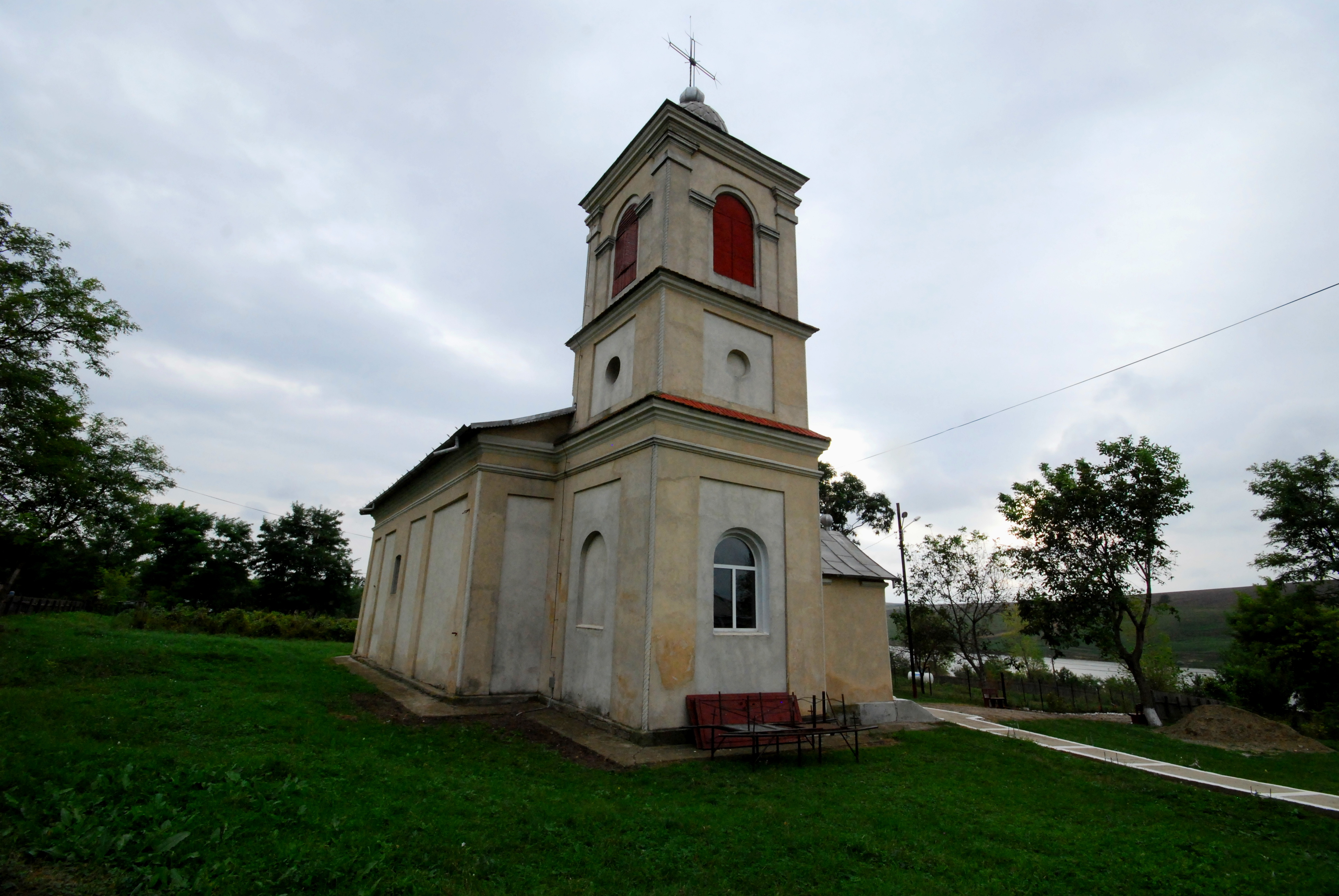
- Church of the Assumption in Gropnița

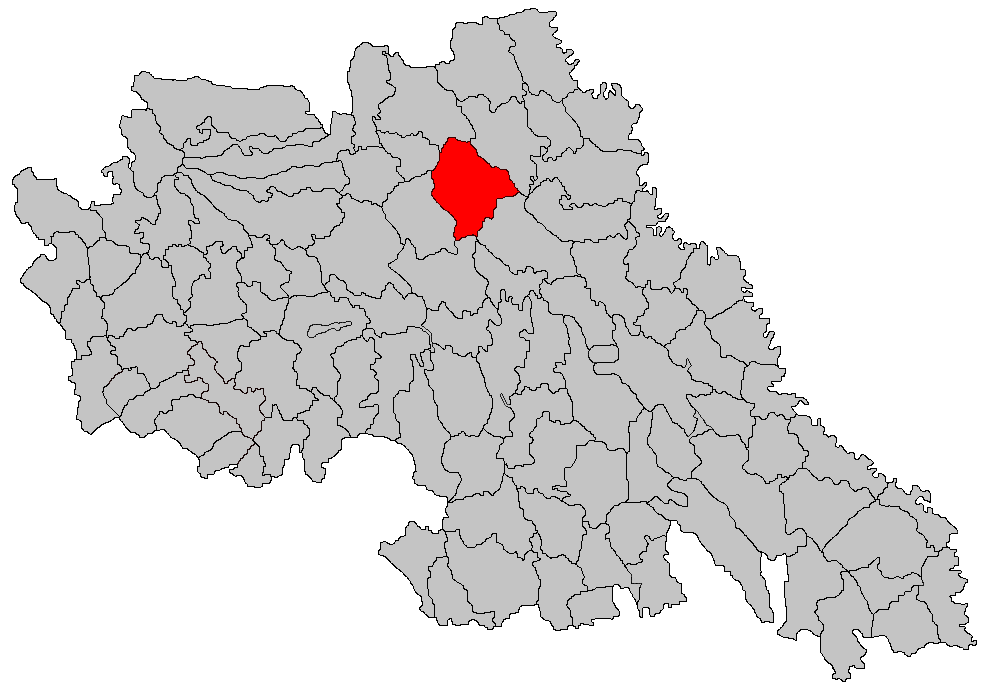
- Location in Iași County

- Location in Romania
- Coordinates: 47°21′N 27°15′E
- Country: Romania
- County: Iași

Government
  - Mayor (2020–2024): Ionel Oneaga (PNL)
- Area: 81.74 km^{2} (31.56 sq mi)
- Elevation: 70 m (230 ft)
- Population (2021-12-01): 3,102
  - Density: 37.95/km^{2} (98.29/sq mi)
- Time zone: UTC+02:00 (EET)
  - Summer (DST): UTC+03:00 (EEST)
- Postal code: 707225
- Vehicle reg.: IS
- Website: www.comuna-gropnita-iasi.ro

Gropnița is a commune in Iași County, Western Moldavia, Romania. It is composed of six villages: Bulbucani, Forăști, Gropnița, Mălăești, Săveni, and Sângeri.
