= Ciohorăni =

- Commune
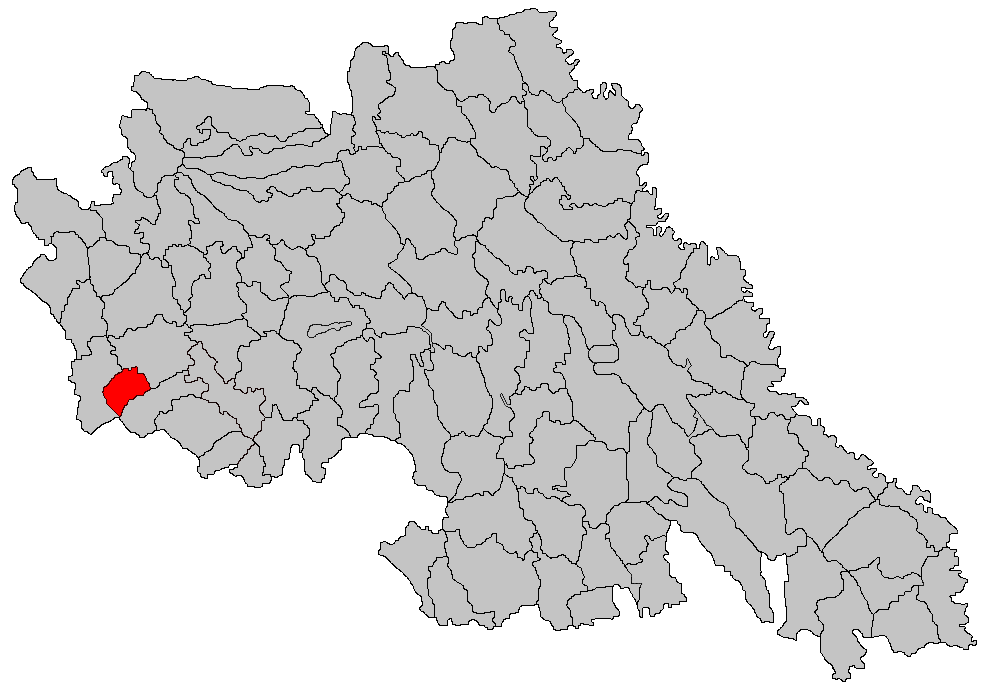
- Location in Iași County

- Location in Romania
- Coordinates: 47°8′N 26°41′E
- Country: Romania
- County: Iași

Government
  - Mayor (2024–2028): Ticu Simion (PSD)
- Area: 14.37 km^{2} (5.55 sq mi)
- Elevation: 297 m (974 ft)
- Population (2021-12-01): 1,709
  - Density: 118.9/km^{2} (308.0/sq mi)
- Time zone: UTC+02:00 (EET)
  - Summer (DST): UTC+03:00 (EEST)
- Postal code: 707326
- Area code: +40 x32
- Vehicle reg.: IS
- Website: www.comunaciohorani.ro

Ciohorăni is a commune in Iași County, Western Moldavia, Romania. It is composed of a single village, Ciohorăni. The commune was formed in 2005, when it split away from Miroslovești.
