= Hălăucești =

- Commune
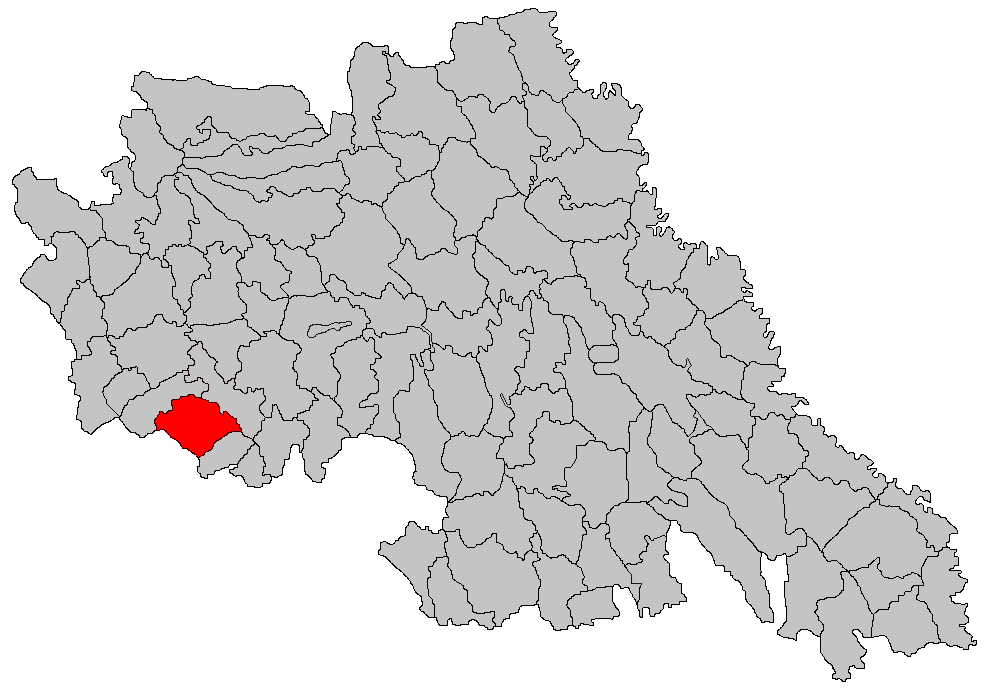
- Location in Iași County

- Location in Romania
- Coordinates: 47°6′N 26°48′E
- Country: Romania
- County: Iași
- Subdivisions: Hălăucești, Luncași

Government
  - Mayor (2024–2028): Iosif Anton (PNL)
- Area: 42.13 km^{2} (16.27 sq mi)
- Elevation: 252 m (827 ft)
- Population (2021-12-01): 4,053
  - Density: 96/km^{2} (250/sq mi)
- Time zone: EET/EEST (UTC+2/+3)
- Postal code: 707240
- Area code: +40 x32
- Vehicle reg.: IS
- Website: primariahalaucesti.ro

Hălăucești (Hungarian: Halasfalva) is a commune in Iași County, Western Moldavia, Romania. It is composed of two villages, Hălăucești and Luncași (Lunkás).

At the 2002 census, 100% of inhabitants were ethnic Romanians. 88.2% were Roman Catholic and 11.7% Romanian Orthodox.
