= Balș, Iași =

Balș
- Commune
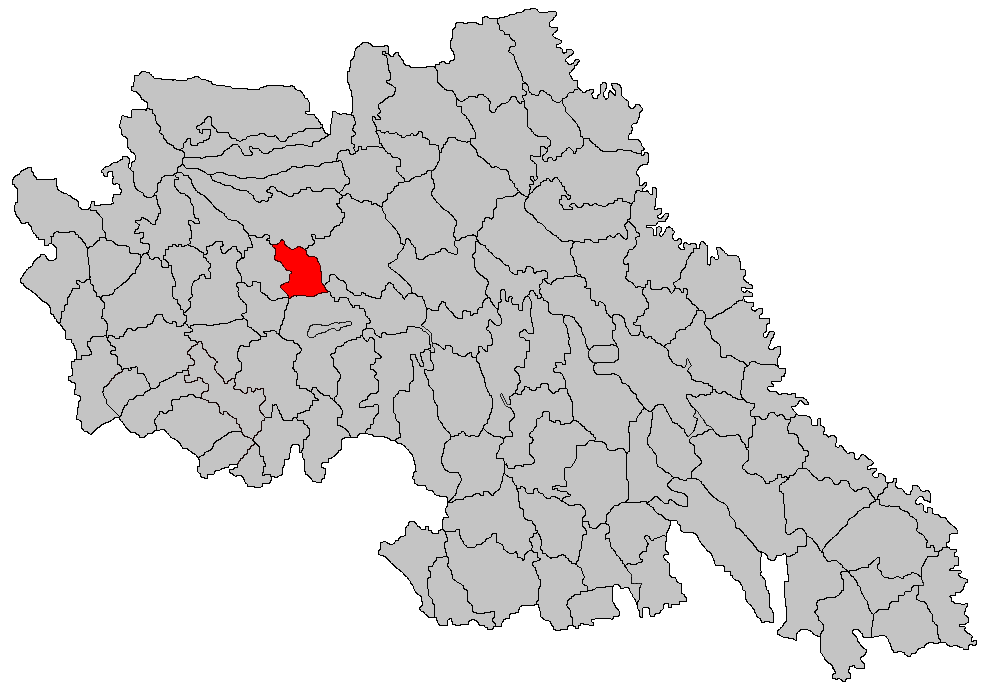
- Location in Iași County

- Location in Romania
- Coordinates: 47°18′N 26°59′E
- Country: Romania
- County: Iași
- Subdivisions: Balș, Boureni, Coasta Măgurii

Government
  - Mayor (2024–2028): Constantin Golduț (PSD)
- Area: 31.55 km^{2} (12.18 sq mi)
- Elevation: 120 m (390 ft)
- Population (2021-12-01): 3,021
  - Density: 96/km^{2} (250/sq mi)
- Time zone: EET/EEST (UTC+2/+3)
- Postal code: 705301
- Area code: +40 x32
- Vehicle reg.: IS
- Website: primariacomuneibals.ro

Balș is a commune in Iași County, Western Moldavia, Romania. It is composed of three villages: Balș, Boureni and Coasta Măgurii. These belonged to Târgu Frumos town until 2004, when they were split off to form a separate commune.
