= Valea Seacă, Iași =

Valea Seacă
- Commune
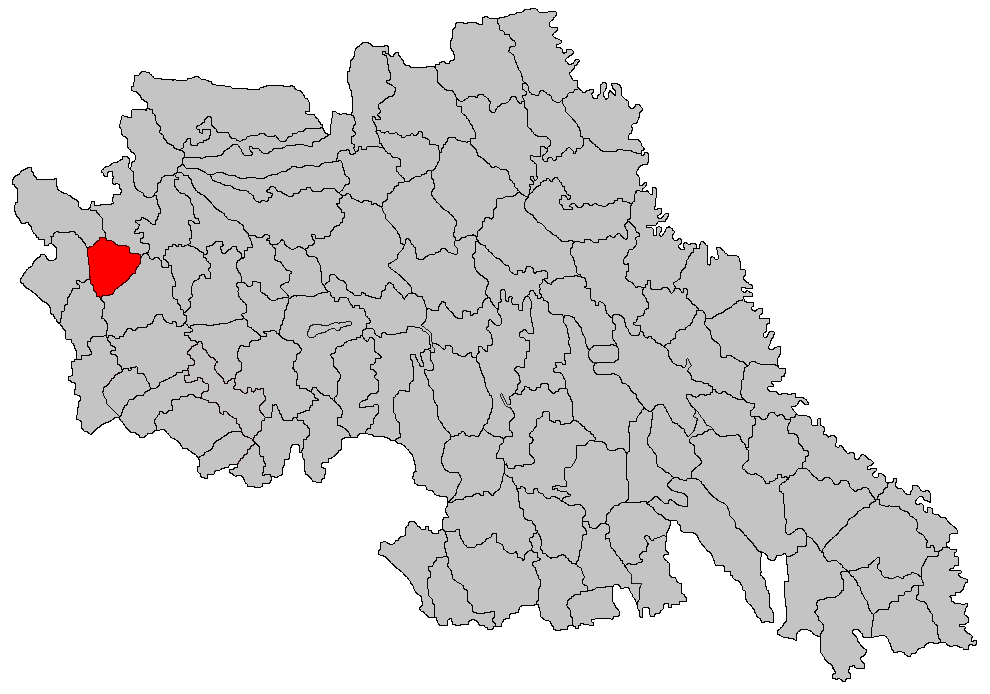
- Location in Iași County

- Location in Romania
- Coordinates: 47°17′N 26°40′E
- Country: Romania
- County: Iași
- Subdivisions: Valea Seacă, Conțești, Topile

Government
  - Mayor (2024–2028): Neculai Miron (PSD)
- Area: 35.87 km^{2} (13.85 sq mi)
- Elevation: 254 m (833 ft)
- Population (2021-12-01): 5,111
  - Density: 140/km^{2} (370/sq mi)
- Time zone: EET/EEST (UTC+2/+3)
- Postal code: 707570
- Area code: +40 x32
- Vehicle reg.: IS
- Website: primariavaleaseaca.ro

Valea Seacă is a commune in Iași County, Western Moldavia, Romania. It is composed of three villages: Conțești, Topile and Valea Seacă.
