= Focuri =

- Commune
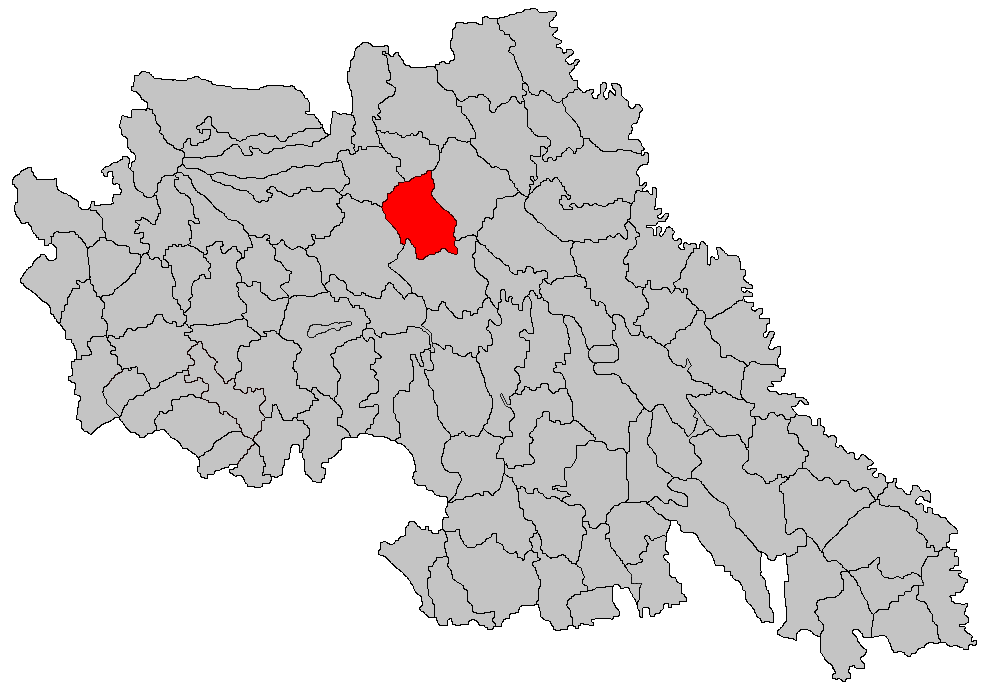
- Location in Iași County

- Location in Romania
- Coordinates: 47°21′N 27°13′E
- Country: Romania
- County: Iași

Government
  - Mayor (2020–2024): Viorel-Vasile Murariu (PSD)
- Area: 60.73 km^{2} (23.45 sq mi)
- Elevation: 89 m (292 ft)
- Population (2021-12-01): 3,729
  - Density: 61/km^{2} (160/sq mi)
- Time zone: EET/EEST (UTC+2/+3)
- Postal code: 707195
- Area code: +40 232
- Vehicle reg.: IS
- Website: comunafocuri.ro

Focuri is a commune in Iași County, Western Moldavia, Romania. It is composed of a single village, Focuri (Romanian for "fires").
