= Oțeleni =

- Commune
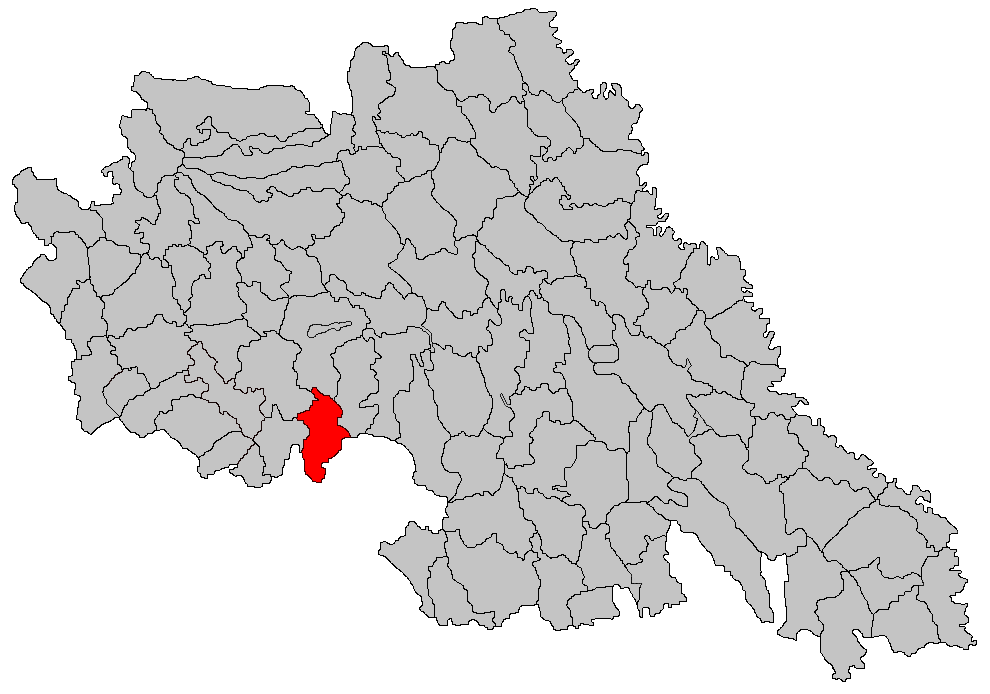
- Location in Iași County

- Location in Romania
- Coordinates: 47°04′N 27°02′E
- Country: Romania
- County: Iași
- Subdivisions: Oțeleni, Hândrești

Government
  - Mayor (2024–2028): Ciprian Aiojoaei (PNL)
- Area: 43.92 km^{2} (16.96 sq mi)
- Elevation: 226 m (741 ft)
- Population (2021-12-01): 2,863
  - Density: 65/km^{2} (170/sq mi)
- Time zone: EET/EEST (UTC+2/+3)
- Postal code: 707355
- Area code: +(40) x32
- Vehicle reg.: IS
- Website: primariaoteleni.ro

Oțeleni (Hungarian: Acélfalva) is a commune in Iași County, Western Moldavia, Romania. It is composed of two villages, Hândrești and Oțeleni.

At the 2002 census, 99.9% of inhabitants were ethnic Romanians. 58.4% were Roman Catholic, 41.2% Romanian Orthodox and 0.3% Pentecostal.
