= Răchiteni =

- Commune
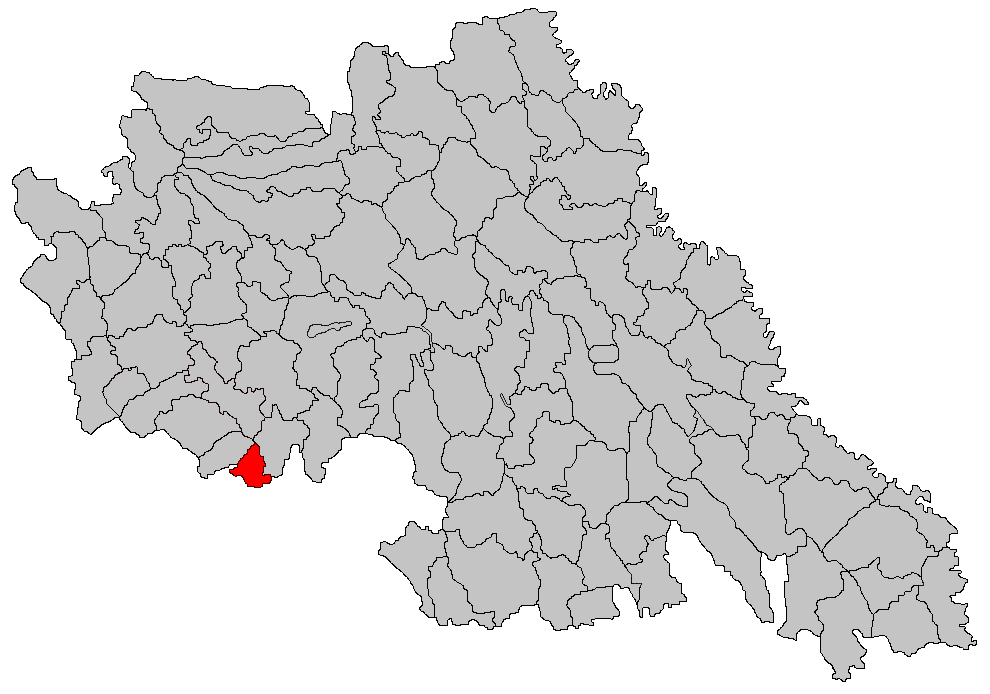
- Location in Iași County

- Location in Romania
- Coordinates: 47°3′N 26°54′E
- Country: Romania
- County: Iași
- Subdivisions: Răchiteni, Izvoarele, Ursărești

Government
  - Mayor (2024–2028): Petre Doboș (PNL)
- Elevation: 192 m (630 ft)
- Population (2021-12-01): 2,541
- Time zone: EET/EEST (UTC+2/+3)
- Postal code: 707298
- Area code: +40 x32
- Vehicle reg.: IS
- Website: primariarachiteni.ro

Răchiteni is a commune in Iași County, Western Moldavia, Romania. It is composed of three villages: Izvoarele, Răchiteni and Ursărești. These belonged to Mircești Commune until 2004, when they were split off to form a separate commune.
