= Moșna, Iași =

Moșna
- Commune
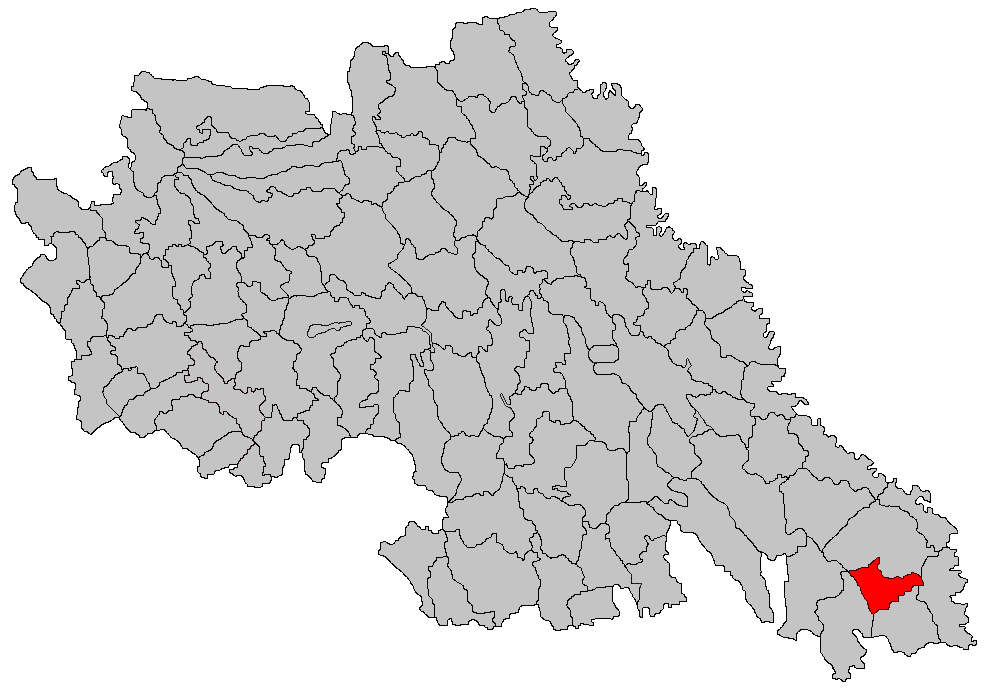
- Location in Iași County

- Location in Romania
- Coordinates: 46°56′N 27°57′E
- Country: Romania
- County: Iași

Government
  - Mayor (2024–2028): Georgel Popa (PNL)
- Area: 28.31 km^{2} (10.93 sq mi)
- Elevation: 183 m (600 ft)
- Population (2021-12-01): 2,421
  - Density: 86/km^{2} (220/sq mi)
- Time zone: EET/EEST (UTC+2/+3)
- Postal code: 707340
- Area code: +(40) x32
- Vehicle reg.: IS
- Website: mosnaiasi.ro

Moșna is a commune in Iași County, Western Moldavia, Romania. It is composed of a single village, Moșna.
