= Iași County =

County of Romania

Iași County Județul Iași
- County
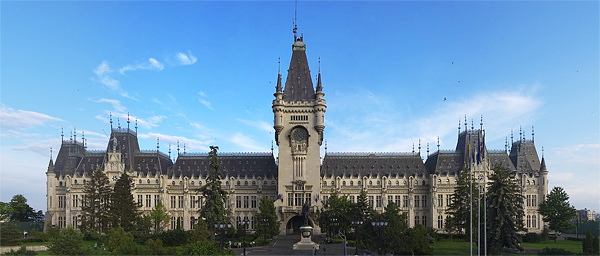
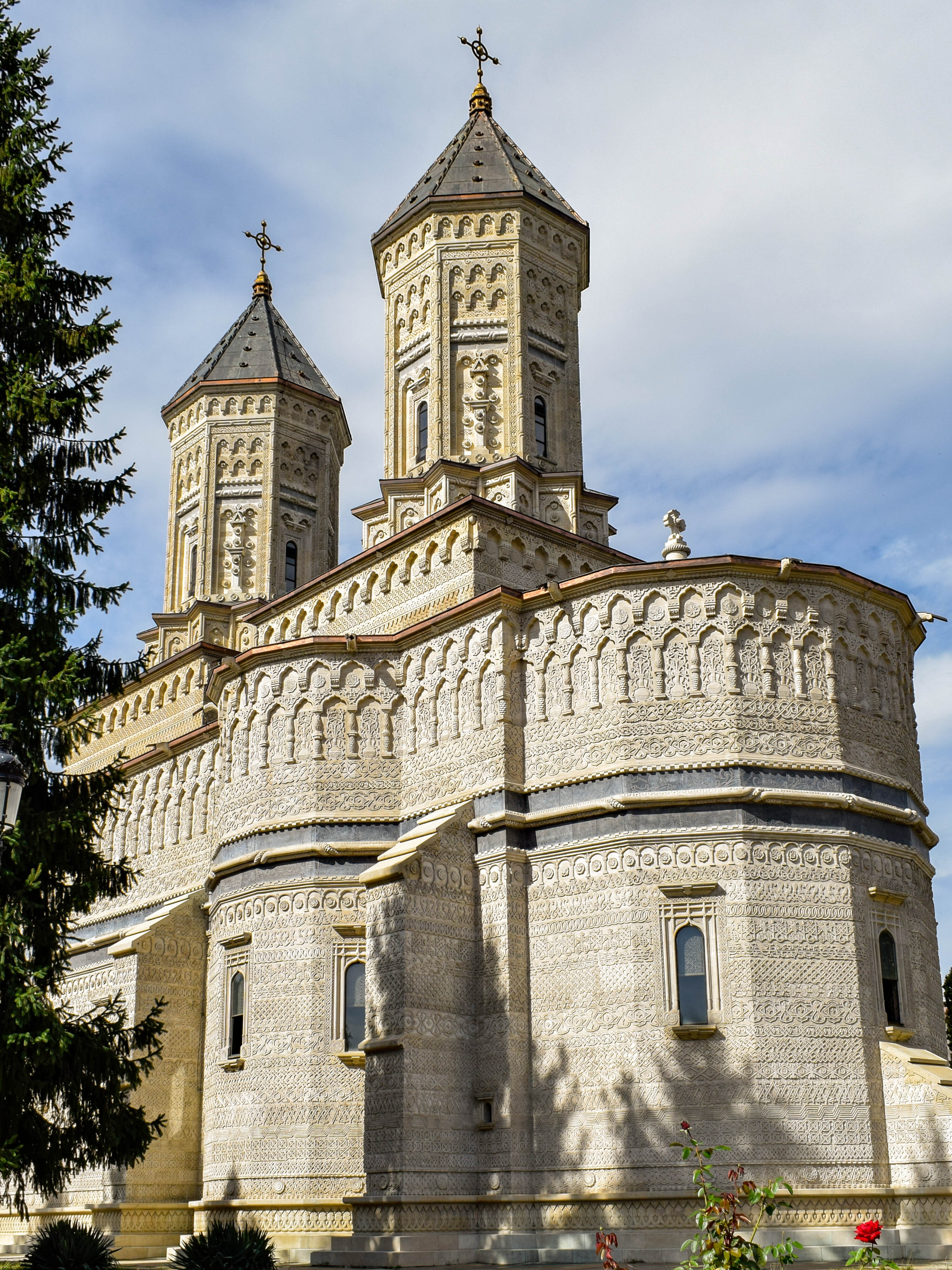
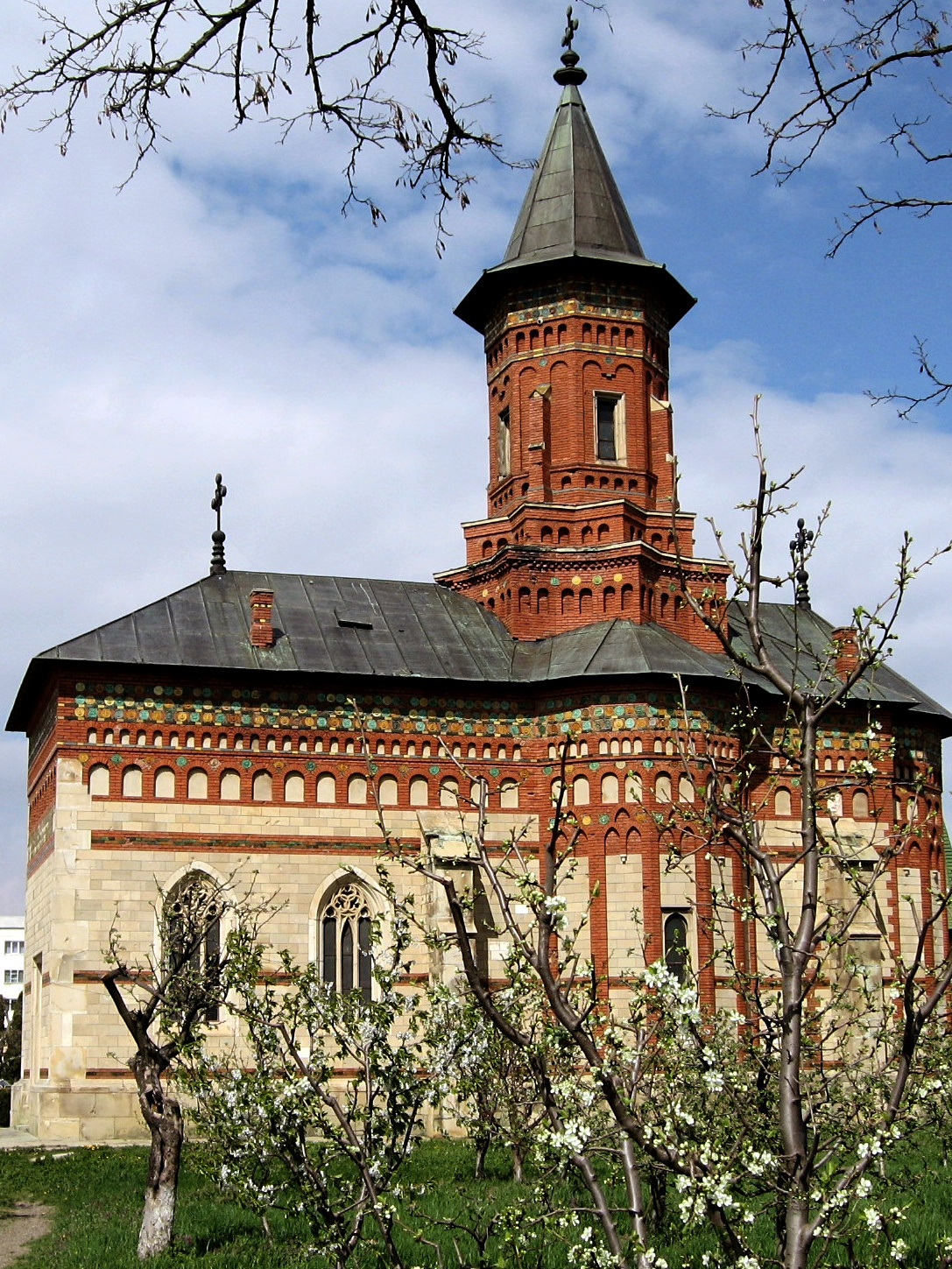
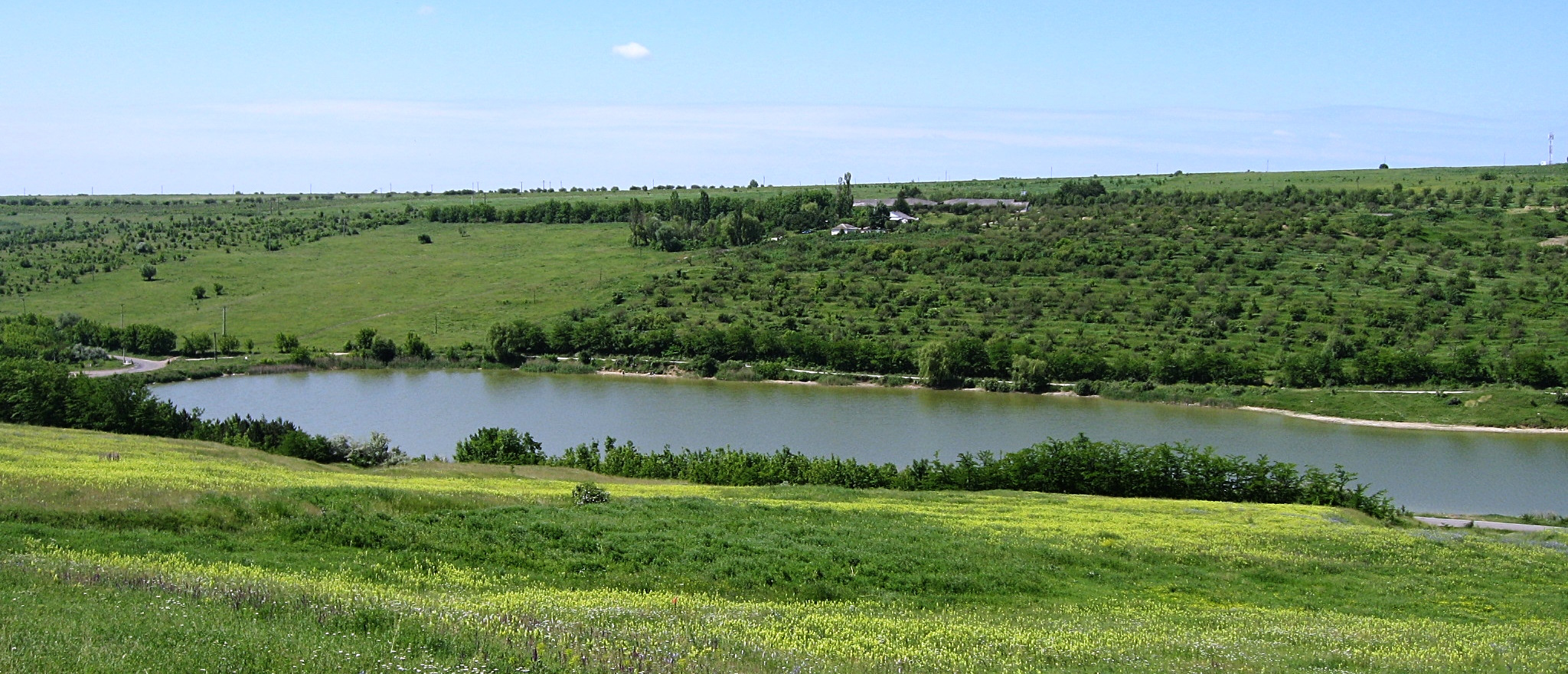
- Iași Palace of Culture Trei Ierarhi Monastery St. George Church, Hârlău Starcea Lake, Butea

- Flag Coat of arms

- Coordinates: 47.25°N 27.31°E
- Country: Romania
- Development region: Nord-Est
- Historical region: Western Moldavia
- Capital: Iași

Government
  - Type: County Board
  - President of the County Board: Alexe Costel
  - Prefect: Constantin Guzgă

Area
  - Total: 5,476 km^{2} (2,114 sq mi)
  - Rank: 23rd

Population (2021-12-01)
  - Total: 760,774
  - Rank: 2nd
  - Density: 138.9/km^{2} (359.8/sq mi)
- Telephone code: (+40) 232 or (+40) 332
- ISO 3166 code: RO-IS
- GDP (nominal): US$ 5.431 billion (2015)
- GDP/per capita: US$ 27,032 (2022)
- Website: County Council; Prefecture

Iași County (Romanian pronunciation: [ˈjaʃʲ]) is a county (județ) of Romania, in Western Moldavia, with the administrative seat at Iași. It is the most populous county in Romania, after the Municipality of Bucharest (which has the same administrative level as that of a county).

== Geography ==
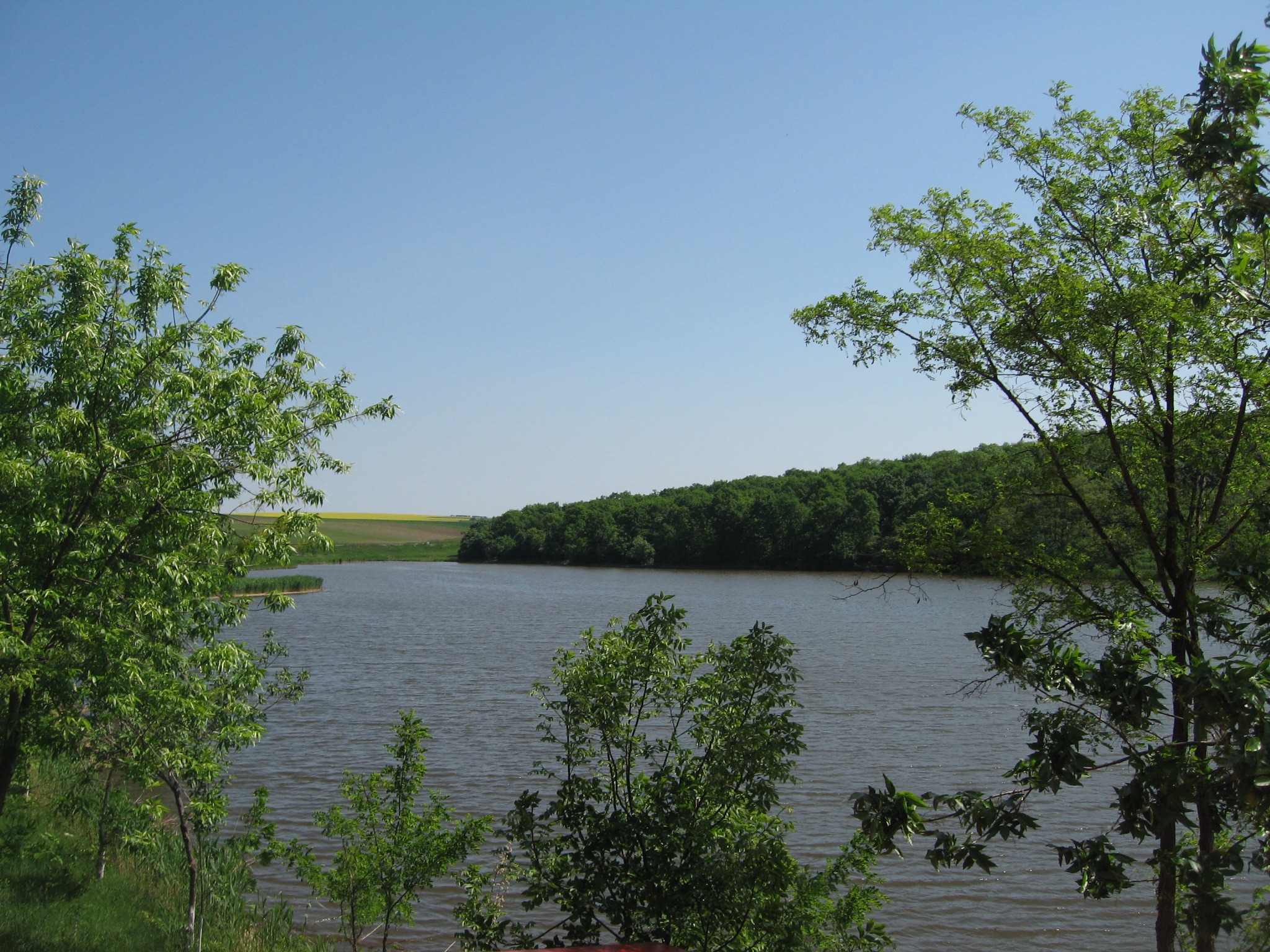
Three Lakes Area

This county has a total area of 5,476 km^{2} (2,114 sq mi). It lies on a plain between the Siret River and the Prut River. Two other rivers run through the county: the Bahlui River (on the banks of which lies the city of Iași) and the Jijia River.

=== Neighbours ===
- Republic of Moldova to the east - Ungheni District, Hîncești District, Nisporeni District, Fălești District and Glodeni District.
- Neamț County to the west.
- Botoșani County and Suceava County to the northwest.
- Vaslui County to the south.

== Demographics ==
At the 2021 census, Iași County had a population of 760,774. At the 2011 census, the county had a population of 772,348. According to the 2012 data provided by the County Population Register Service, the total registered population of the county was 873,662 people.

- Romanians – 97.61%
- Romani – 1.55%
- Lipovans – 0.39%
- Others – 0.3%

The population of Iași County nowadays is nearly double of what it was seventy years ago.

Year	County population
1948	431,586
1956	516,635 ▲
1966	619,027 ▲
1977	729,243 ▲
1992	806,778 ▲
2002	816,910 ▲
2011	772,348 ▼
2021	760,774 ▼

== County government ==
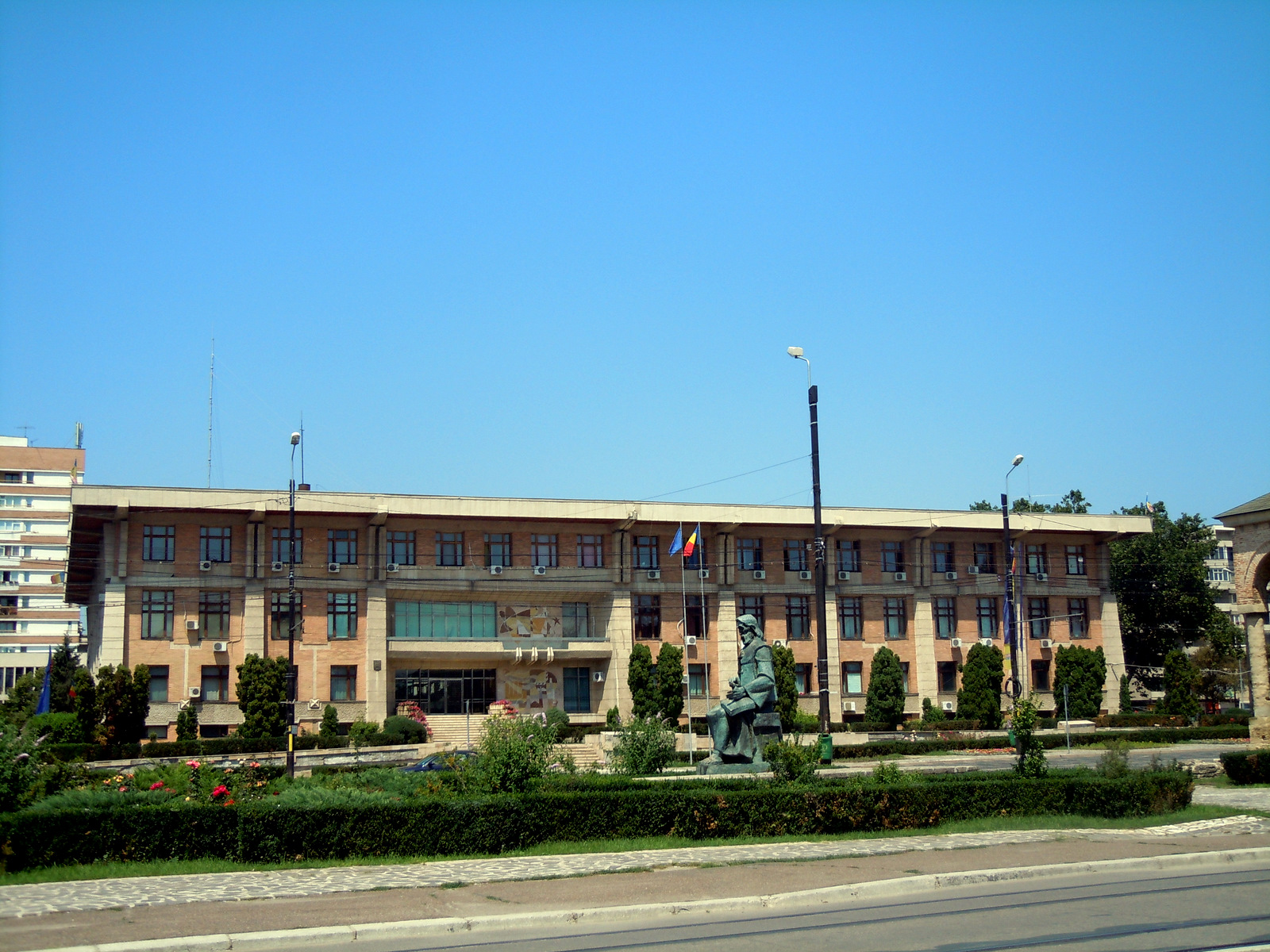
Iași County Council and Prefecture Headquarters

The Iași County Council, renewed at the 2020 local elections, consists of 36 counsellors, with the following party composition:

Party	Seats	Current County Council
National Liberal Party (PNL)	17	
Social Democratic Party (PSD)	10	
Save Romania Union (USR)	6	
People's Movement Party (PMP)	3	

== Economy ==
This county is predominantly agricultural, due to its topography. Industry is concentrated in the cities. The principal industries are:

- Software
- Pharmaceuticals
- Automotive
- Metallurgy and heavy-equipment manufacturing
- Electronics & Electrotechnics
- Textiles
- Food production

== Tourism ==
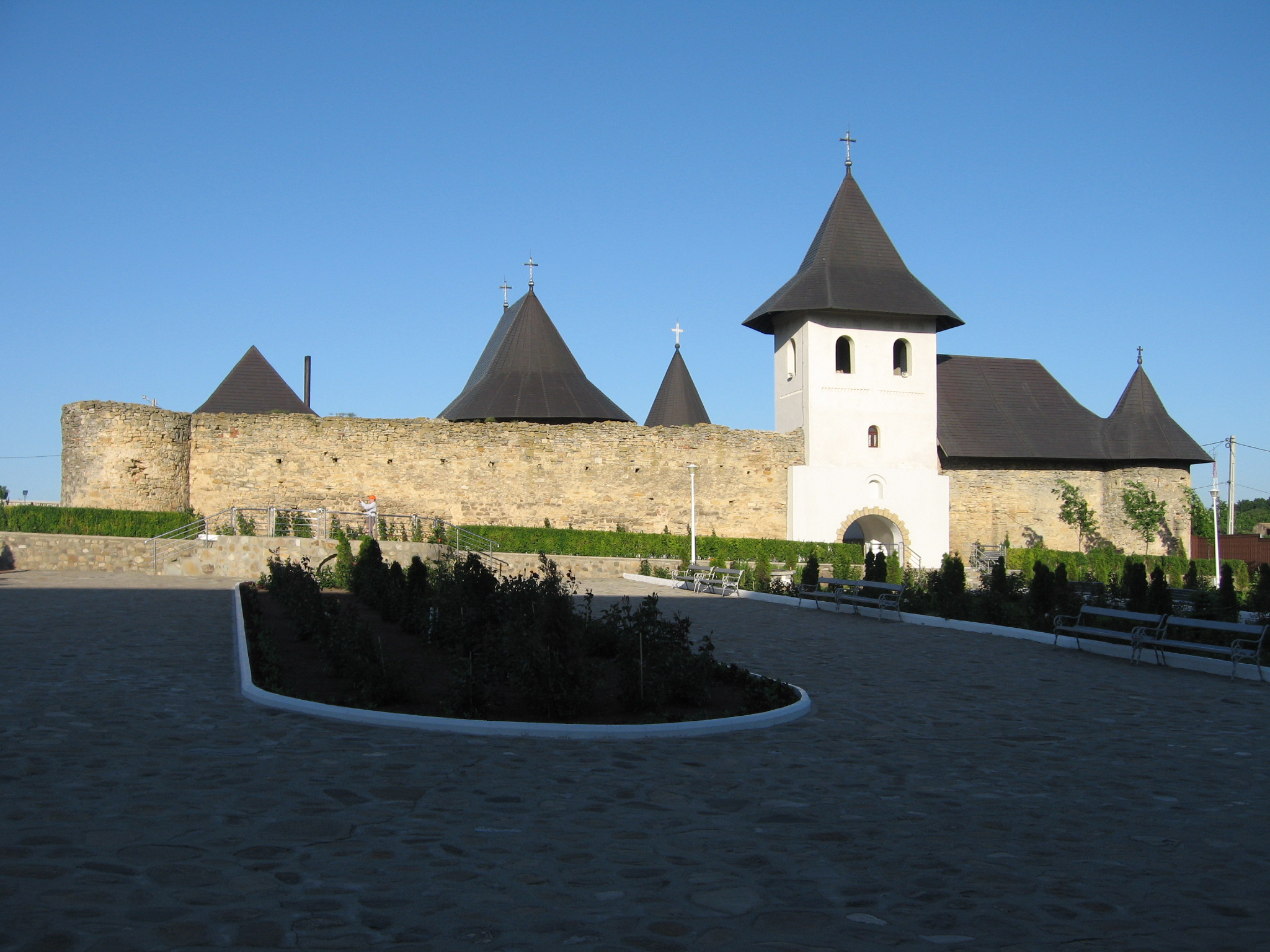
Hadâmbu Monastery

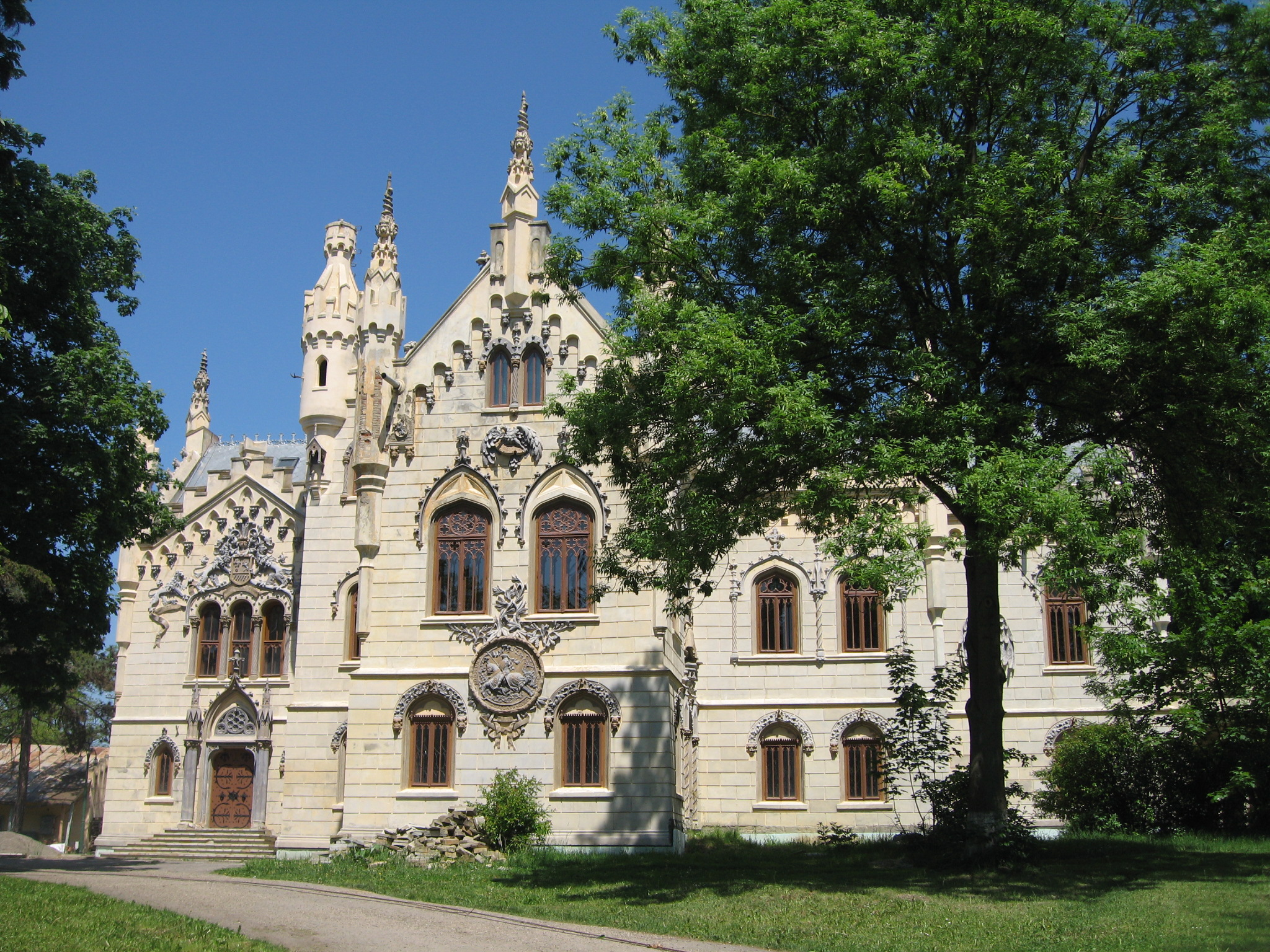
Sturdza Palace in Miclăușeni

The city of Iași is the most important city in Moldavia and one of the most important social, cultural and business centres in Romania. It has the oldest University in the country, and, until the formation of the United Principalities, it was the capital of Moldavia.

Some of the tourist destinations in the county:

- City of Iași and its environs (the Seven hills of Iași);
- Alexandru Ioan Cuza Memorial Palace in Ruginoasa;
- Cucuteni - Neolithic archeological site;
- Cotnari and Bohotin vineyards;
- Museum of Vineyard and Wine in Hârlău;
- Hadâmbu and Dobrovăț Monasteries;
- Miclăușeni Castle and Monastery;
- Vasile Alecsandri Memorial House in Mircești;
- Constantin Negruzzi Museum in Hermeziu;
- Cezar Petrescu Museum in Cotnari;
- City of Pașcani, and towns of Târgu Frumos and Hârlău;
- Strunga health resort.

== Communities ==
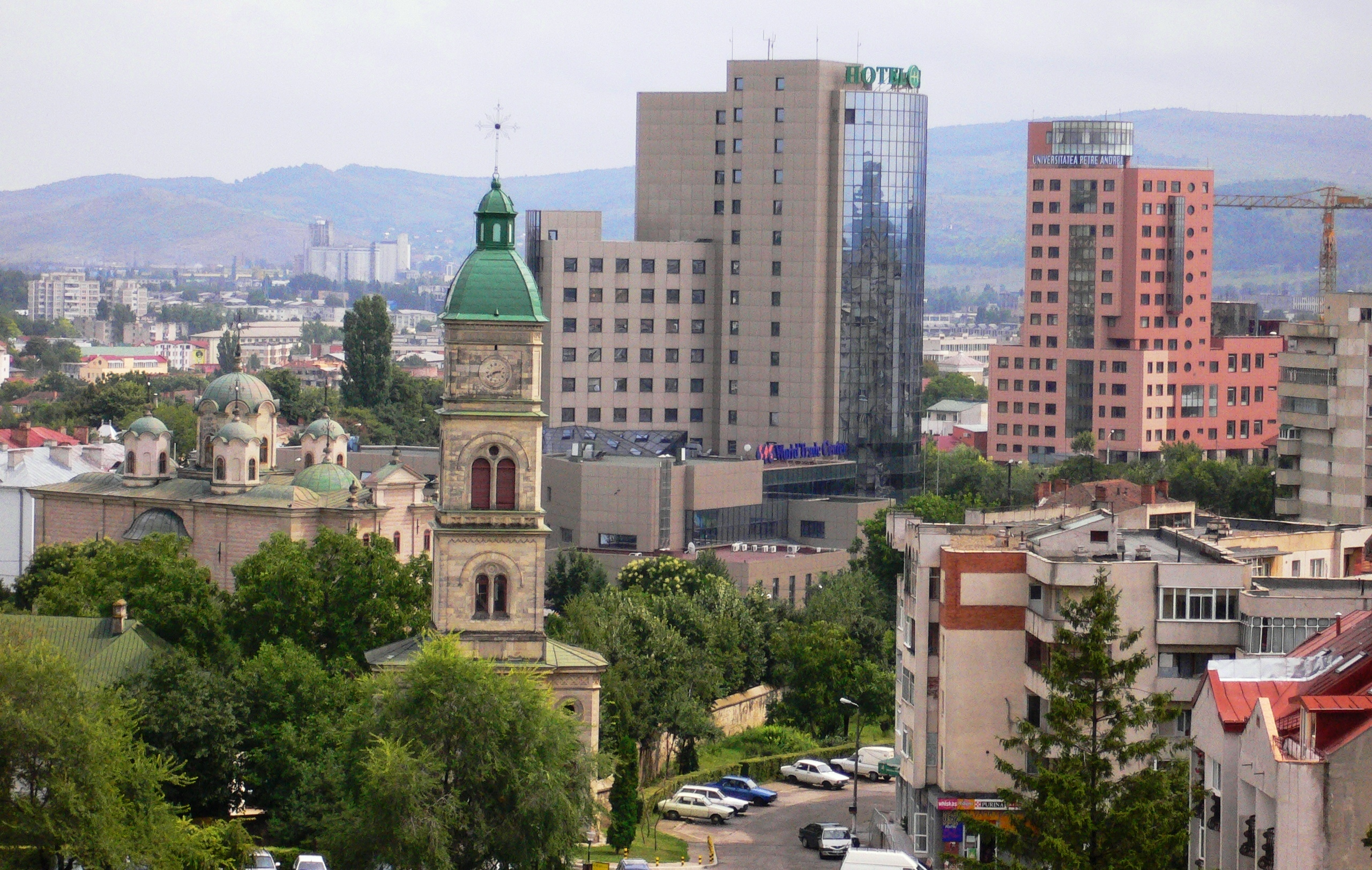
Iași

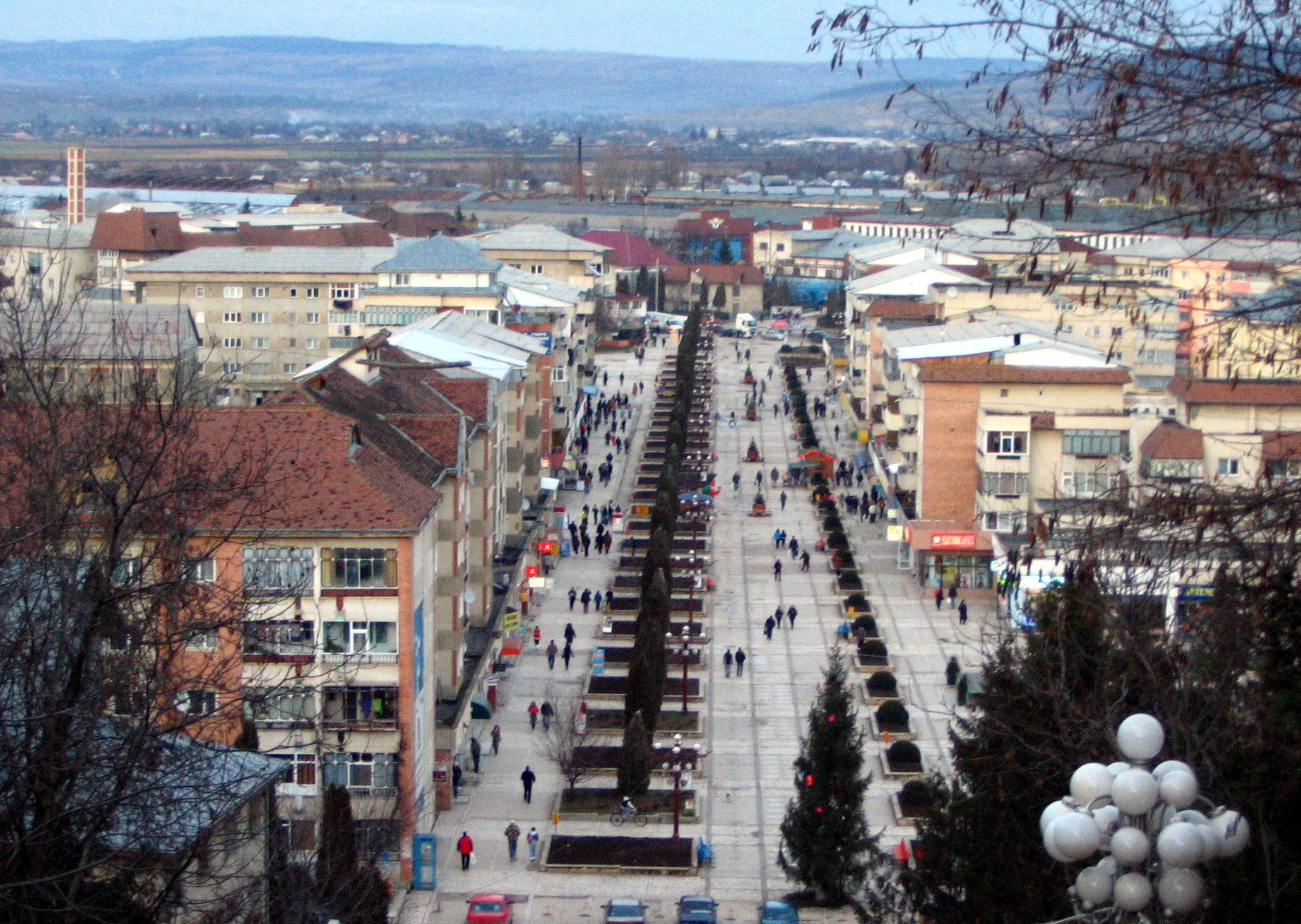
Pașcani

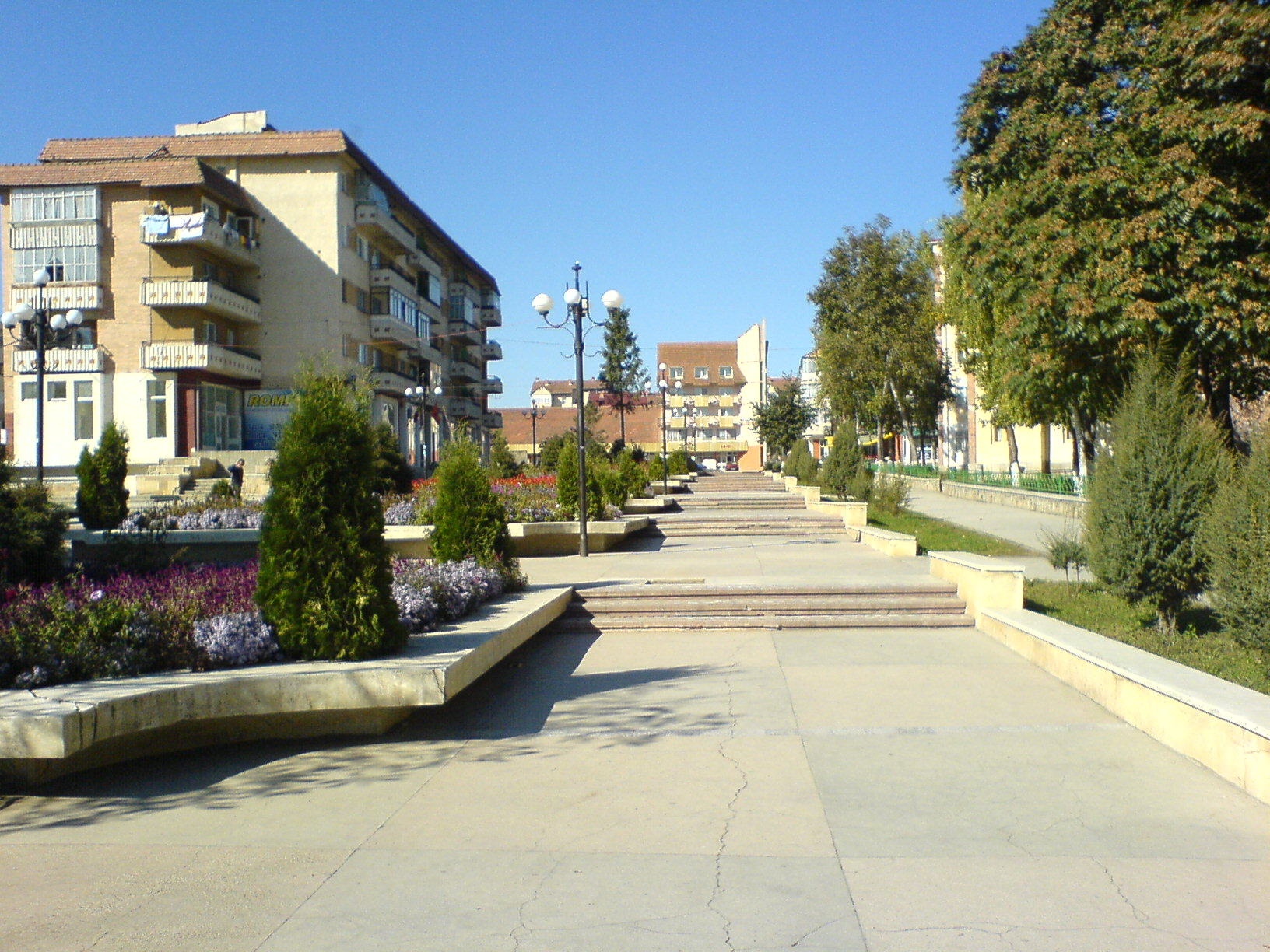
Târgu Frumos

Iași County has 2 municipalities, 3 towns, and 93 communes

- Municipalities (as of 2021 census)
  - Iași - population: 271,692 (and 465,477 (as of 2014) in the urban area)
  - Pașcani - population: 30,766
- Towns
  - Hârlău
  - Podu Iloaiei
  - Târgu Frumos
- Communes
  - Alexandru Ioan Cuza
  - Andrieșeni
  - Aroneanu
  - Balș
  - Bălțați
  - Bârnova
  - Belcești
  - Bivolari
  - Brăești
  - Butea
  - Ceplenița
  - Ciohorăni
  - Ciortești
  - Ciurea
  - Coarnele Caprei
  - Comarna
  - Costești
  - Costuleni
  - Cotnari
  - Cozmești
  - Cristești
  - Cucuteni
  - Dagâța
  - Deleni
  - Dobrovăț
  - Dolhești
  - Drăgușeni
  - Dumești
  - Erbiceni
  - Fântânele
  - Focuri
  - Golăiești
  - Gorban
  - Grajduri
  - Gropnița
  - Grozești
  - Hălăucești
  - Hărmănești
  - Heleșteni
  - Holboca
  - Horlești
  - Ion Neculce
  - Ipatele
  - Lespezi
  - Lețcani
  - Lungani
  - Mădârjac
  - Mircești
  - Mironeasa
  - Miroslava
  - Miroslovești
  - Mogoșești
  - Mogoșești-Siret
  - Moșna
  - Moțca
  - Movileni
  - Oțeleni
  - Plugari
  - Popești
  - Popricani
  - Prisăcani
  - Probota
  - Răchiteni
  - Răducăneni
  - Rediu
  - Românești
  - Roșcani
  - Ruginoasa
  - Scânteia
  - Schitu Duca
  - Scobinți
  - Sinești
  - Sirețel
  - Stolniceni-Prăjescu
  - Strunga
  - Șcheia
  - Șipote
  - Tansa
  - Tătăruși
  - Țibana
  - Țibănești
  - Țigănași
  - Todirești
  - Tomești
  - Trifești
  - Țuțora
  - Ungheni
  - Valea Lupului
  - Valea Seacă
  - Vânători
  - Victoria
  - Vlădeni
  - Voinești

== Historical county ==
Județul Iași
- County (Județ)
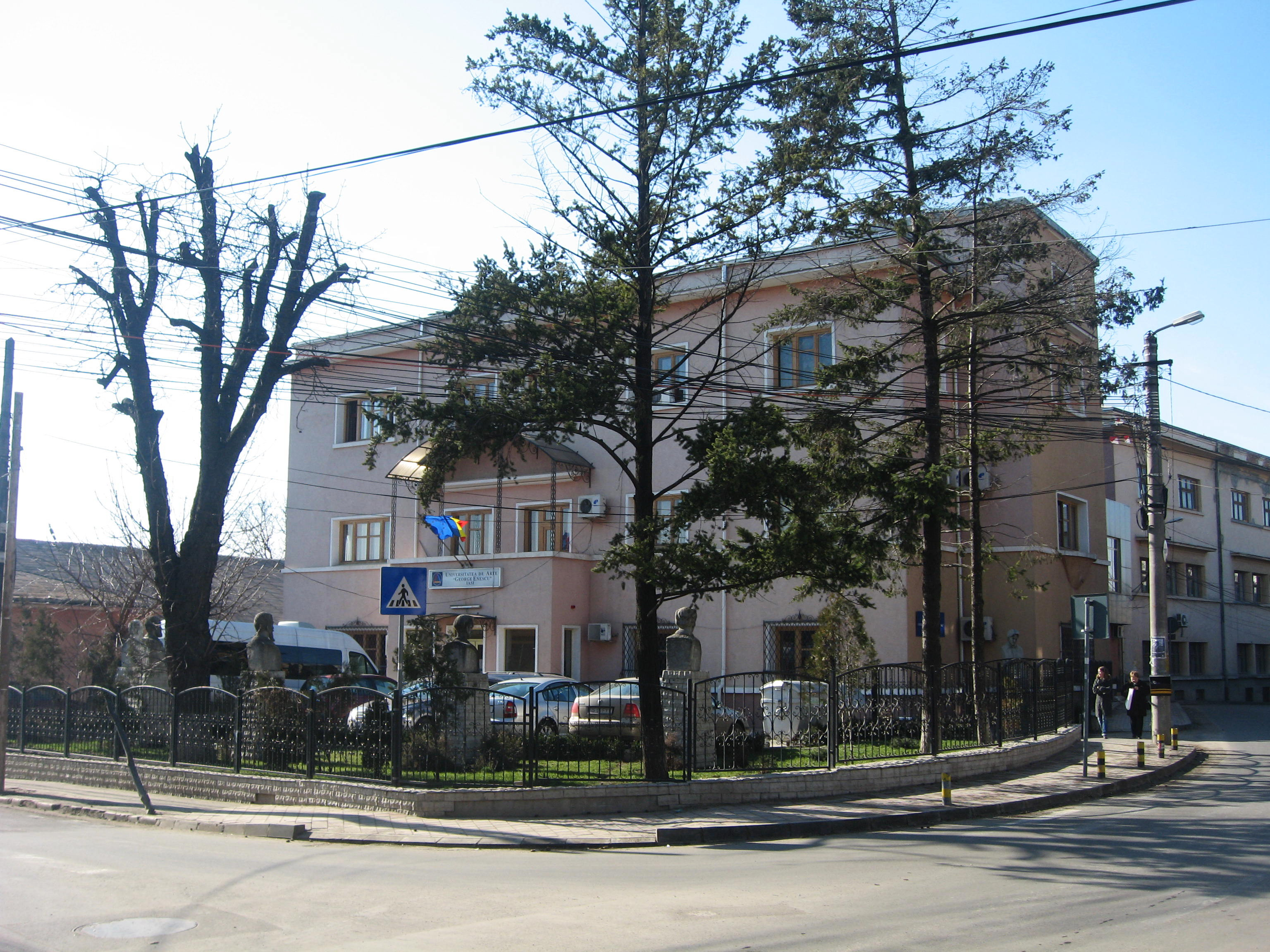
- The building of the prefecture of Iași County from the interwar period, now the George Enescu National University of Arts

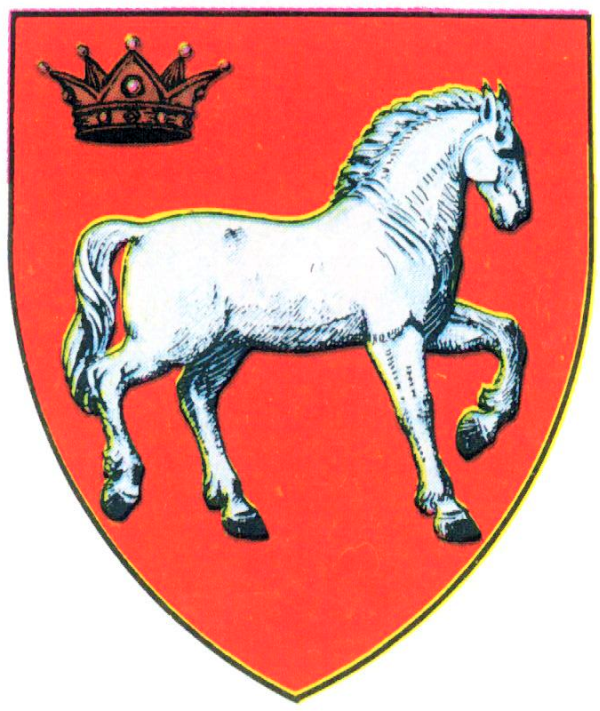
- Coat of arms

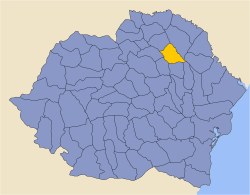
- Country: Romania
- Historic region: Western Moldavia
- Capital city (Reședință de județ): Iași

Area
  - Total: 3,227 km^{2} (1,246 sq mi)

Population (1930)
  - Total: 275,796
  - Density: 85.47/km^{2} (221.4/sq mi)
- Time zone: UTC+2 (EET)
  - Summer (DST): UTC+3 (EEST)

The county was located in the northeastern part of Greater Romania, in the northeast of the region of Moldavia. Today, most of the territory of the former county is part of the current Iași County. In the eastern part of the county, the county included a part of the left bank of the Prut River, now in the territory of the Republic of Moldova. It was bordered to the north by the counties of Botoșani and Bălți, to the east by Lăpușna County, to the south by the counties of Fălciu and Vaslui, and to the west by the counties of Roman and Baia.

=== Administration ===
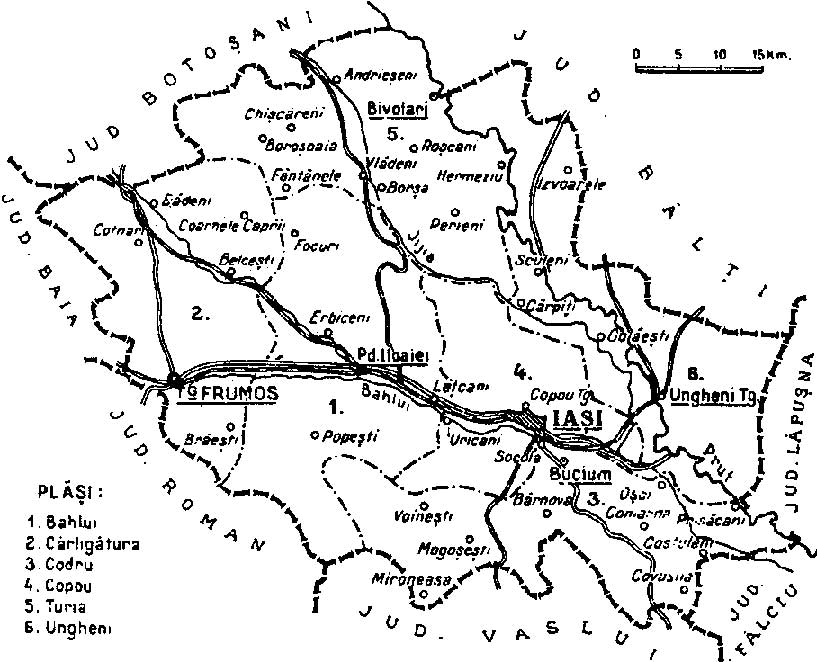
Map of Iași County as constituted in 1938.

In 1938, the county was divided into six districts (plăși):

1. Plasa Bahlui, headquartered at Podu Iloaiei
2. Plasa Cârligătura, headquartered at Târgu Frumos
3. Plasa Codru, headquartered at Buciumii (at that time a commune, now Bucium District in the city of Iași)
4. Plasa Copou, headquartered at Iași
5. Plasa Turia, headquartered at Șipotele
6. Plasa Ungheni, headquartered at Ungheni-Târg, now the city of Ungheni in the Republic of Moldova

Iași County included two urban localities: Iași (county seat) and urban commune Târgu Frumos, located at the western border of the county.

=== Population ===
According to the 1930 census data, the county population was 275,796 inhabitants, 81.6% Romanians, 14.6% Jews, 0.6% Russians, 0.5% Hungarians, 0.4% Germans, as well as other minorities. From the religious point of view, the population was 82.0% Eastern Orthodox, 14.9% Jewish, 2.3% Roman Catholic, as well as other minorities.

==== Urban population ====
In 1930, the county's urban population was 107,804 inhabitants, 102,872 in Iaşi and 4,932 in Târgu Frumos, comprising 60.8% Romanians, 33.6% Jews, 0.9% Germans, 0.9% Russians, as well as other minorities. In the urban area, languages were Romanian (72.5%), followed by Yiddish (22.2%), Russian (1.8%), German (0.9%), as well as other minorities. From the religious point of view, the urban population was composed of Eastern Orthodox (61.4%), Jewish (34.4%), Roman Catholic (3.0%), as well as other minorities.
