= Cristești, Iași =

Cristești
- Commune
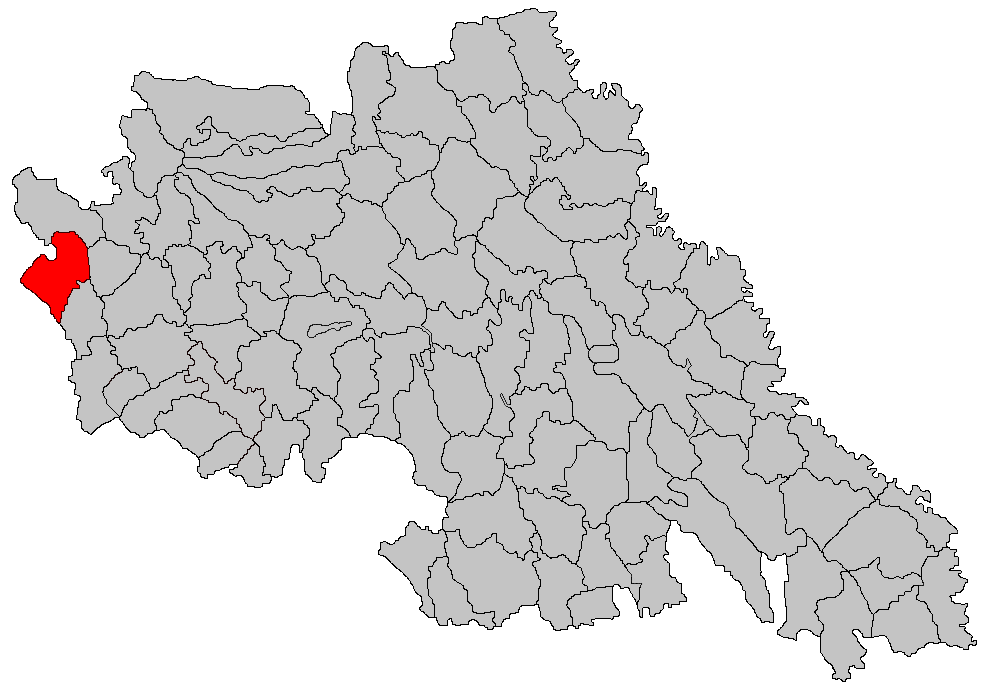
- Location in Iași County

- Location in Romania
- Coordinates: 47°15′N 26°35′E
- Country: Romania
- County: Iași
- Subdivisions: Cristești, Homița

Government
  - Mayor (2024–2028): Vlad-Mihai Pintili (PNL)
- Area: 29.73 km^{2} (11.48 sq mi)
- Elevation: 307 m (1,007 ft)
- Population (2021-12-01): 3,761
  - Density: 130/km^{2} (330/sq mi)
- Time zone: EET/EEST (UTC+2/+3)
- Postal code: 707145
- Area code: +40 x32
- Vehicle reg.: IS
- Website: comunacristesti.ro

Cristești is a commune in Iași County, Western Moldavia, Romania. It is composed of two villages, Cristești and Homița.
