= Scobinți =

- Commune
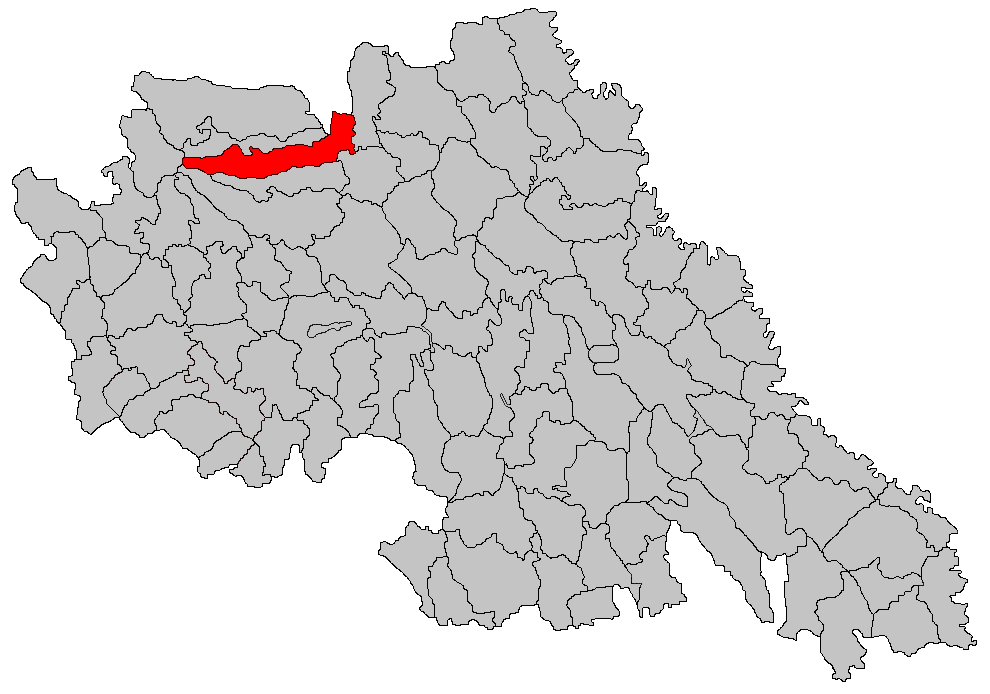
- Location in Iași County

- Location in Romania
- Coordinates: 47°23′N 26°56′E
- Country: Romania
- County: Iași
- Subdivisions: Scobinți, Bădeni, Fetești, Sticlăria, Zagavia

Government
  - Mayor (2024–2028): Gheorghe Hrițcu (PNL)
- Area: 71.08 km^{2} (27.44 sq mi)
- Elevation: 214 m (702 ft)
- Population (2021-12-01): 6,565
  - Density: 92/km^{2} (240/sq mi)
- Time zone: EET/EEST (UTC+2/+3)
- Postal code: 707445
- Area code: +40 x32
- Vehicle reg.: IS
- Website: primariascobinti.ro

Scobinți is a commune in Iași County, Western Moldavia, Romania. It is composed of five villages: Bădeni, Fetești, Scobinți, Sticlăria and Zagavia.
