= Mogoșești-Siret =

- Commune
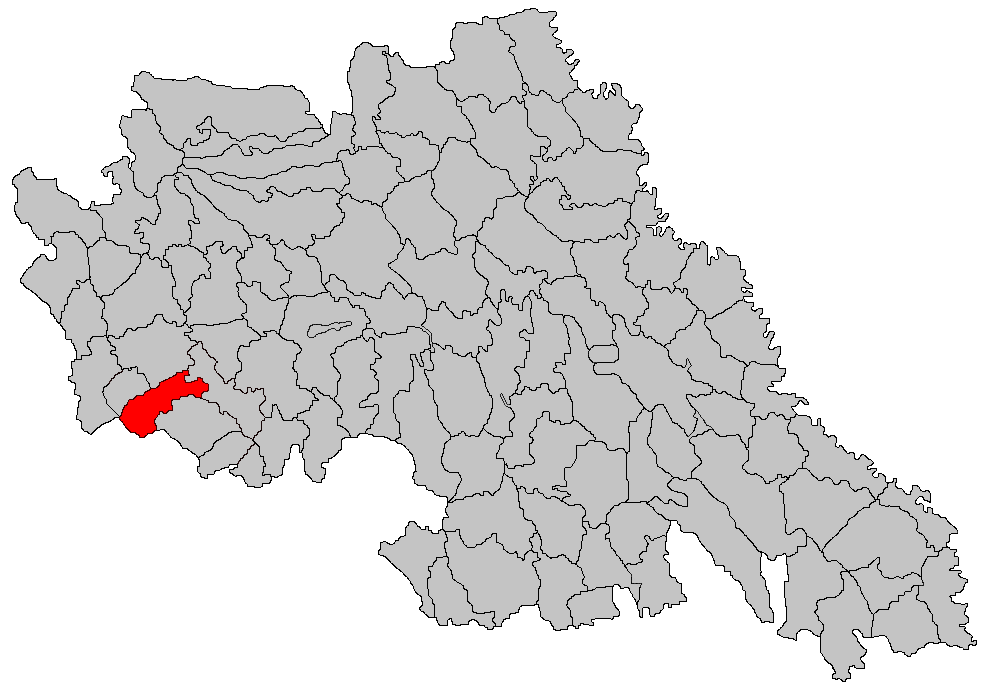
- Location in Iași County

- Location in Romania
- Coordinates: 47°8′N 26°47′E
- Country: Romania
- County: Iași

Government
  - Mayor (2020–2024): Damian Butnariu (PNL)
- Area: 38.96 km^{2} (15.04 sq mi)
- Elevation: 231 m (758 ft)
- Population (2021-12-01): 3,111
  - Density: 80/km^{2} (210/sq mi)
- Time zone: EET/EEST (UTC+2/+3)
- Postal code: 707335
- Area code: +(40) 232
- Vehicle reg.: IS
- Website: www.mogosesti-siret.ro

Mogoșești-Siret is a commune in Iași County, Western Moldavia, Romania. It is composed of three villages: Mogoșești-Siret, Muncelu de Sus, and Tudor Vladimirescu.

The commune is situated on the Moldavian Plateau, at an altitude of 231 m (758 ft), on the right bank of the Siret River. It is located in the western part of Iași County, 74 km (46 mi) from the county seat, the municipality of Iași, on the border with Neamț County.

The Mogoșești and Muncelu train stations serve the CFR Main Line 500, which connects Bucharest with the Ukrainian border near Chernivtsi.
