= Românești, Iași =

Românești
- Commune
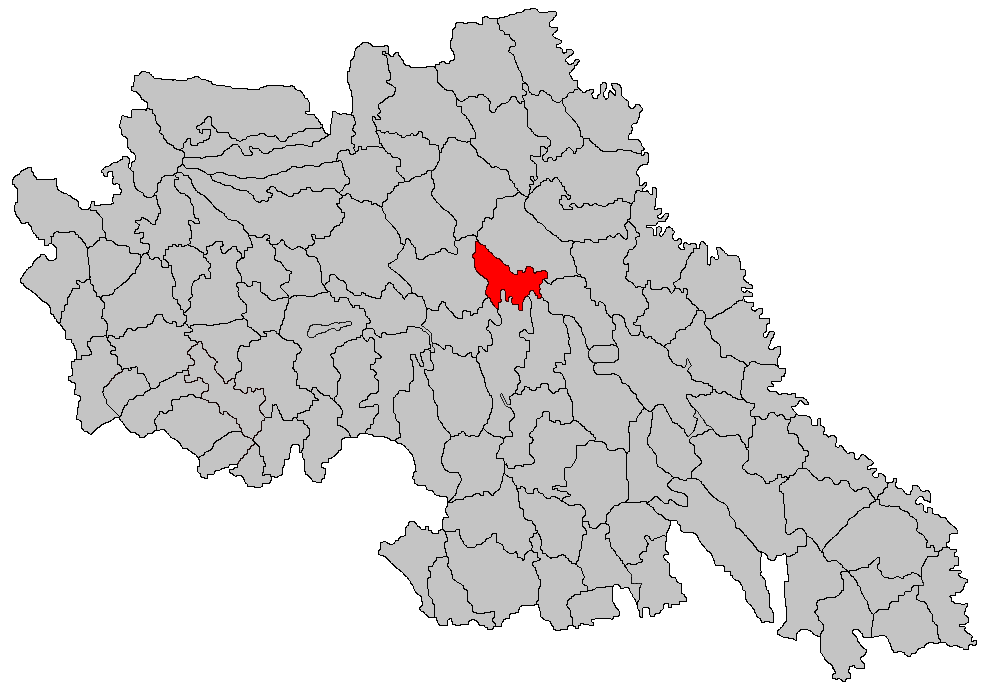
- Location in Iași County

- Location in Romania
- Coordinates: 47°17′N 27°19′E
- Country: Romania
- County: Iași
- Subdivisions: Românești, Avântu, Ursoaia

Government
  - Mayor (2024–2028): Ioan Stegariu (PNL)
- Area: 38.59 km^{2} (14.90 sq mi)
- Elevation: 97 m (318 ft)
- Population (2021-12-01): 1,524
  - Density: 39/km^{2} (100/sq mi)
- Time zone: EET/EEST (UTC+2/+3)
- Postal code: 707415
- Area code: +40 x32
- Vehicle reg.: IS
- Website: www.comuna-romanesti.ro

Românești is a commune in Iași County, Western Moldavia, Romania. It is composed of three villages: Avântu, Românești and Ursoaia.
