= Heleșteni =

Heleşteni
- Commune
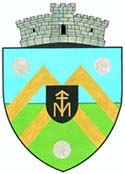
- Coat of arms

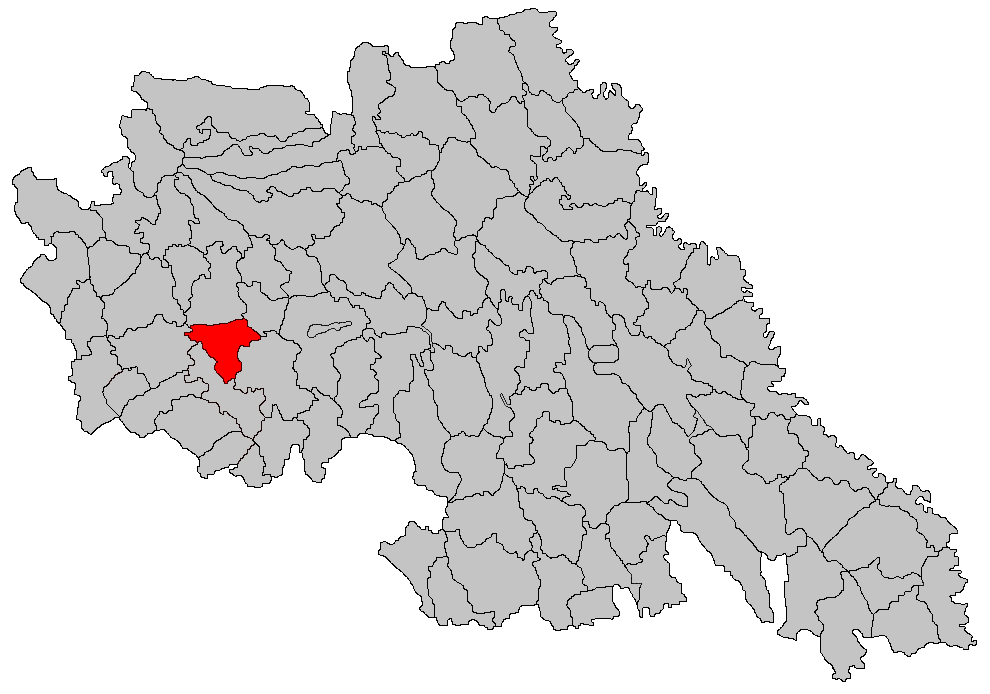
- Location in Iași County

- Location in Romania
- Coordinates: 47°12′N 26°53′E
- Country: Romania
- County: Iași
- Subdivisions: Heleșteni, Hărmăneasa, Movileni, Oboroceni

Government
  - Mayor (2024–2028): Benone Șofrac (PSD)
- Area: 33.89 km^{2} (13.09 sq mi)
- Elevation: 279 m (915 ft)
- Population (2021-12-01): 2,142
  - Density: 63/km^{2} (160/sq mi)
- Time zone: EET/EEST (UTC+2/+3)
- Postal code: 707245
- Area code: +40 x32
- Vehicle reg.: IS
- Website: www.comunahelesteni.ro

Heleșteni is a commune in Iași County, Western Moldavia, Romania. It is composed of four villages: Hărmăneasa, Heleșteni, Movileni and Oboroceni.
