= Popești, Iași =

Popești
- Commune
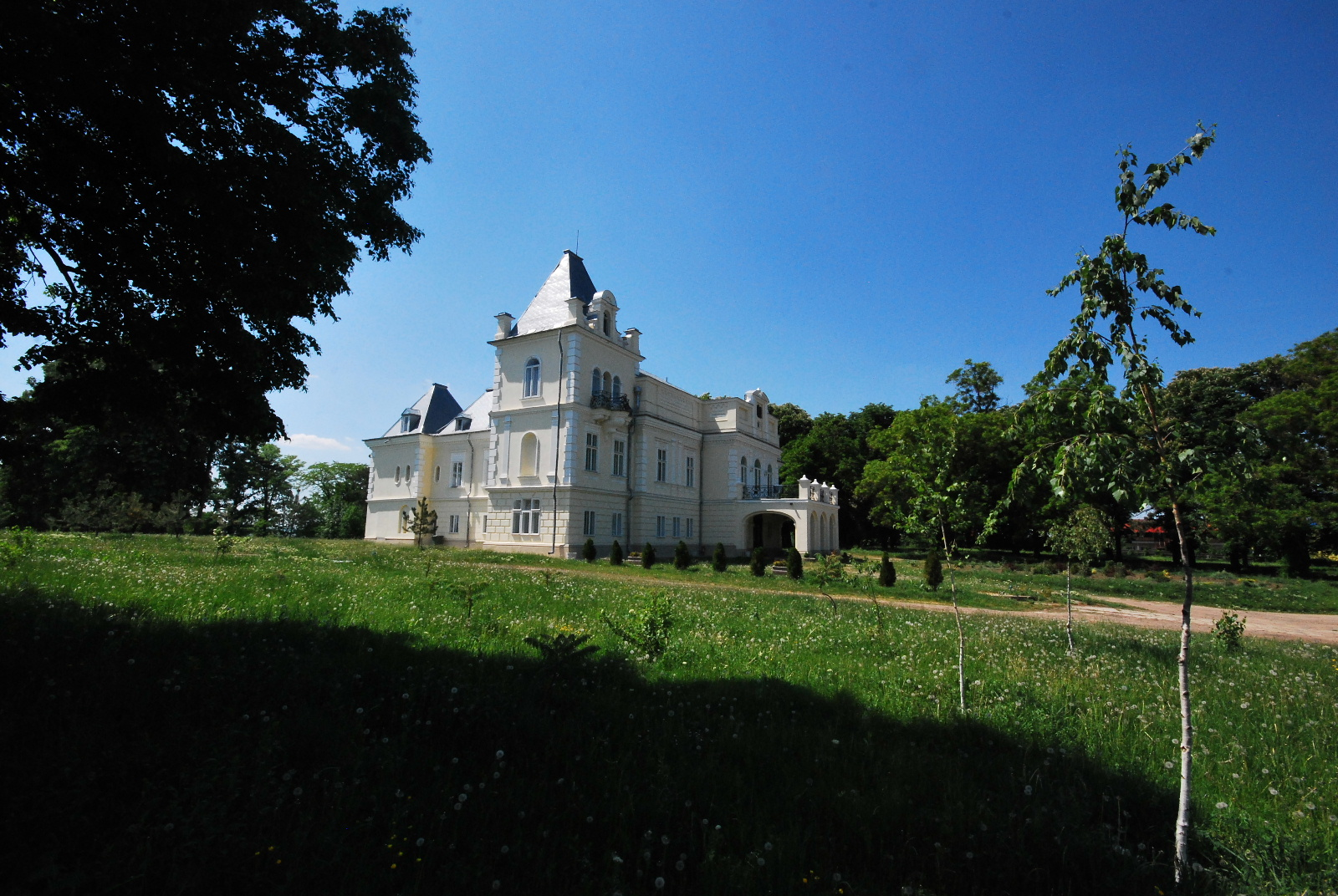
- Cantacuzino-Pașcanu mansion

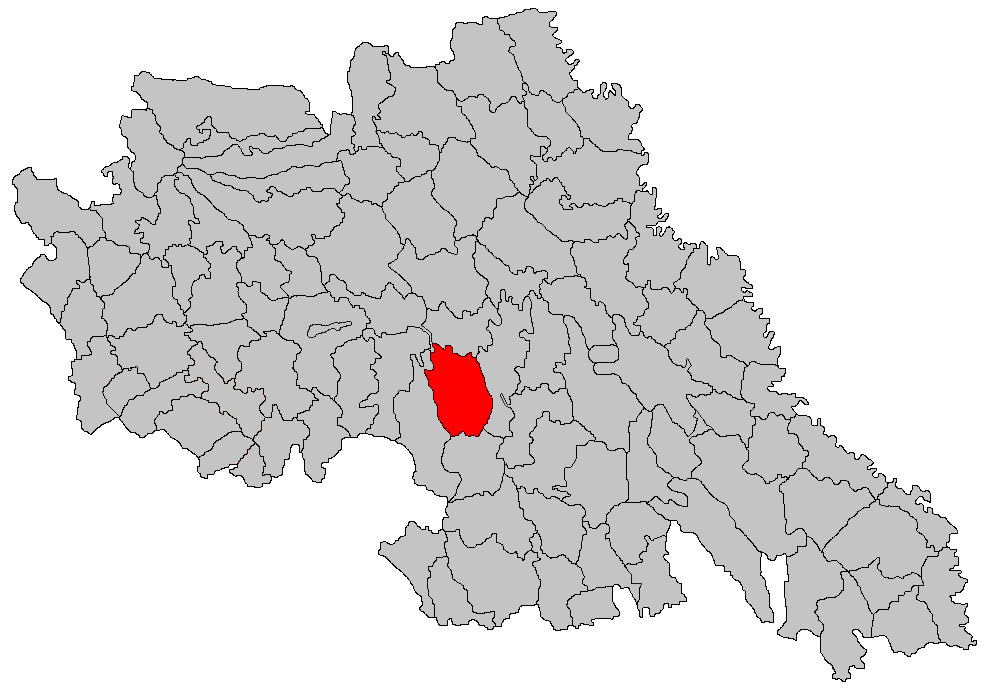
- Location in Iași County

- Location in Romania
- Coordinates: 47°09′N 27°15′E
- Country: Romania
- County: Iași
- Subdivisions: Popești, Doroșcani, Hărpășești, Obrijeni, Pădureni, Vama

Government
  - Mayor (2024–2028): Vasile Lupu (PNL)
- Area: 72.64 km^{2} (28.05 sq mi)
- Elevation: 139 m (456 ft)
- Population (2021-12-01): 4,287
  - Density: 59.02/km^{2} (152.9/sq mi)
- Time zone: UTC+02:00 (EET)
  - Summer (DST): UTC+03:00 (EEST)
- Postal code: 707370
- Area code: +40 x32
- Vehicle reg.: IS
- Website: primariapopestiiasi.ro

Popești is a commune in Iași County, Western Moldavia, Romania. It is composed of six villages: Doroșcani, Hărpășești, Obrijeni, Pădureni, Popești and Vama.
