= Dolhești, Iași =

Dolhești
- Commune
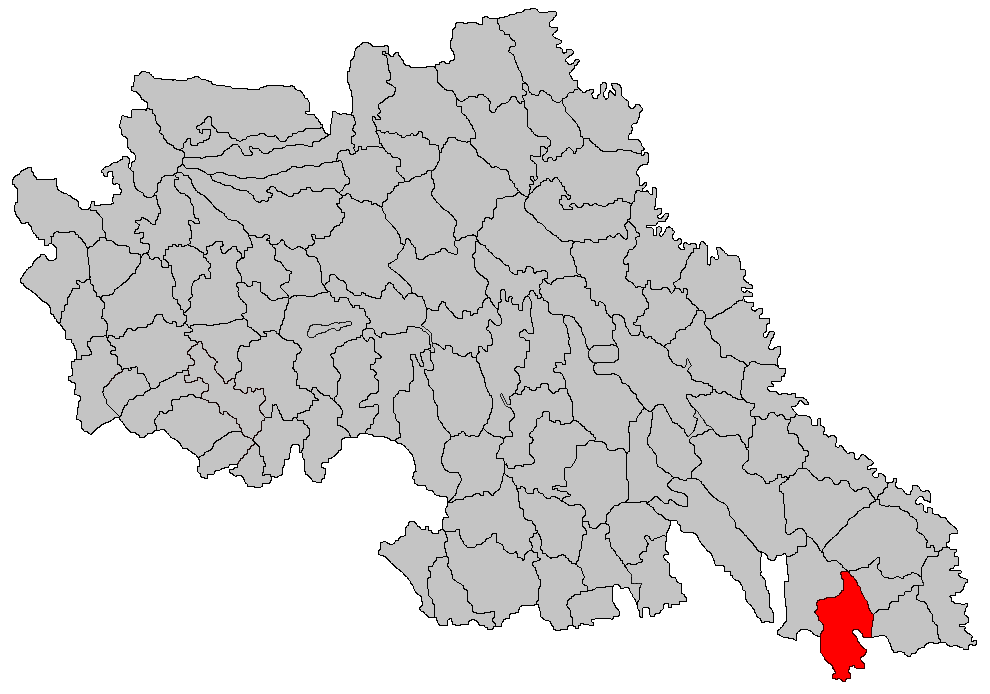
- Location in Iași County

- Location in Romania
- Coordinates: 46°52′N 27°54′E
- Country: Romania
- County: Iași
- Subdivisions: Dolhești, Brădicești, Pietriș

Government
  - Mayor (2024–2028): Iulian-Mirel Tăbăcaru (PNL)
- Area: 55 km^{2} (21 sq mi)
- Elevation: 216 m (709 ft)
- Population (2021-12-01): 2,180
  - Density: 40/km^{2} (100/sq mi)
- Time zone: EET/EEST (UTC+2/+3)
- Postal code: 707180
- Area code: +40 x32
- Vehicle reg.: IS
- Website: www.dolhesti-iasi.ro

Dolhești is a commune in Iași County, Western Moldavia, Romania. It is composed of three villages: Brădicești, Dolhești and Pietriș.
