= Mironeasa =

- Commune
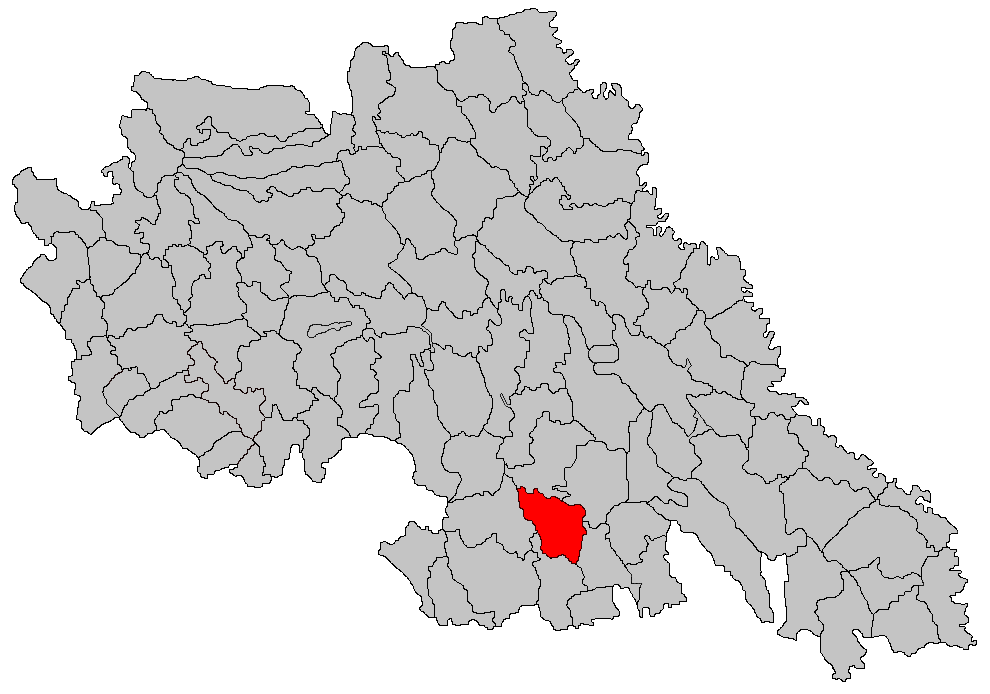
- Location in Iași County

- Location in Romania
- Coordinates: 46°58′N 27°25′E
- Country: Romania
- County: Iași
- Subdivisions: Mironeasa, Schitu Hadâmbului, Urșița

Government
  - Mayor (2024–2028): Elena Curcudel (PNL)
- Area: 46.67 km^{2} (18.02 sq mi)
- Elevation: 189 m (620 ft)
- Population (2021-12-01): 4,422
  - Density: 95/km^{2} (250/sq mi)
- Time zone: EET/EEST (UTC+2/+3)
- Postal code: 707300
- Area code: +(40) x32
- Vehicle reg.: IS
- Website: primariamironeasa.ro

Mironeasa is a commune in Iași County, Western Moldavia, Romania. It is composed of three villages: Mironeasa, Schitu Hadâmbului and Urșița.
