= Șomuzul Mare =

- Location within Romania

Location
- Country: Romania
- Counties: Suceava County
- Cities: Fălticeni

Physical characteristics
- Mouth: Siret
  - coordinates: 47.4072°N 26.6332°E
- Length: 62 km (39 mi)
- Basin size: 483 km^{2} (186 sq mi)

Basin features
- Progression: Siret→ Danube→ Black Sea

The Șomuzul Mare is a right tributary of the river Siret in Romania. It discharges into the Siret near Dolhasca. The basin size of the 62 km (39 mi) long Șomuzul Mare is 483 km^{2} (186 sq mi). It flows through the villages Stroiești, Zaharești, Liteni, Pocoleni, Fălticeni (city), Șoldănești, Huși, Preutești, Basarabi, Arghira, Dolheștii Mari, Dolheștii Mici and Dolhasca (town). The Șomuz and Pocoleni dams are built on this river.

== Tributaries ==
The following rivers are tributaries to the river Șomuzul Mare (from source to mouth):

- Left: Humoria, Frumoasa, Vătavu, Boroșeni, Cimbrina, Prisaca, Brana
- Right: Stupca, Iazuri, Brădățel, Târgul, Leucușești, Platonița
