= Rădășeni =

- Commune
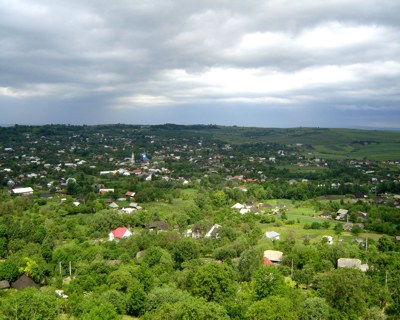
- Rural landscape from Rădășeni

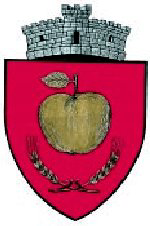
- Coat of arms

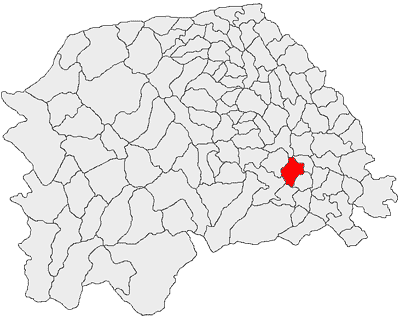
- Location in Suceava County

- Location in Romania
- Coordinates: 47°28′N 26°15′E
- Country: Romania
- County: Suceava

Government
  - Mayor (2024–2028): Neculai Perju (PNL)
- Area: 40 km^{2} (15 sq mi)
- Elevation: 338 m (1,109 ft)
- Population (2021-12-01): 3,508
  - Density: 88/km^{2} (230/sq mi)
- Time zone: UTC+02:00 (EET)
  - Summer (DST): UTC+03:00 (EEST)
- Postal code: 727460
- Vehicle reg.: SV
- Website: www.comunaradaseni.ro

Rădășeni is a commune located in Suceava County, Western Moldavia, northeastern Romania. It is composed of three villages: Lămășeni, Pocoleni and Rădășeni. The village of Rădășeni, the commune seat, is first recorded in 1424 and has long been known for its orchards.

== Geography ==
Rădășeni lies on the Suceava Plateau, in the basin of the Șomuzul Mare, a tributary of the Siret. The commune is crossed by the Șomuzul Mare and its tributaries, the Șipote, Siliștea, Lămășanca and Brădățel. Its altitude was recorded in 1894 as 340–350 m. The village brook, known as Pârâul Satului and also as the Rădășanca or the Rădășeni brook, rises on the hill above the village, next to the former cabin that hosted various events in the communist period, crosses Rădășeni and flows into the Șomuzul Mare. The village of Rădășeni sits in a large depression, the Groapa Rădășenilor (about 5 km north–south, 2 km east–west and 100 m deep), surrounded by hills and open only to the north-east, so that it can be seen only from the surrounding heights; an 1894 description noted that it had "the appearance of a forest of fruit trees". In 1926 the geographer Ion Simionescu described the village as "compact", lying "in a wide basin hollowed out at the end of Horbaza hill", from which one can see the Moldova valley with Baia and, in the distance, the Pietrele Doamnei and Ceahlău mountains. The Cetățuia hill south-east of the village, on which a memorial cross was raised in 2008, overlooks the Fălticeni area. The Movila Rugului hill, on the boundary between Rădășeni and Lămășeni, reaches 403 m.

The commune lies north-west of the municipality of Fălticeni, on the right bank of the Șomuzul Mare. In 1894 the village lay 2.5 km from the town. At that time it bordered Oprișeni (later absorbed into Fălticeni) to the east, Sasca and Brădățel to the west, Baia to the south and the Austrian Bukovina to the north. During the First World War the neighbouring village of Bunești, north of Cetățuia, was described as a border village. The commune borders Fălticeni, Baia, Cornu Luncii and Horodniceni. The Horbaza (Horbază) pasture on the boundary with Fălticeni once held the horticultural base of the Fălticeni fruit-growing research station. The Doabra hill marks the meeting point of Lămășeni, Pocoleni and Horodniceni. The commune's coat of arms, approved in 2003, shows an apple with a leaf for fruit growing, two crossed ears of wheat for agriculture and, above, the walls of the Suceava fortress.

== History ==
=== Prehistory ===
The Cetățuia hill above the village is the site of a long-known Neolithic settlement of the Cucuteni–Trypillia culture (phase A). A polished stone axe and chisel were found there during a survey in 1958–1961. According to Todirel Călugărița, the settlement also has a phase B level and a defensive ditch.

The first research in the area was carried out between 1888 and 1895 by Nicolae Beldiceanu and Grigore Buțureanu. Flint tools and pottery were reported on the plateau in 1894. Vasile Ciurea, who founded the museum in Fălticeni in 1914, wrote that the pieces in its collection came partly from trenches dug on Cetățuia by local troops in the summer of 1915 and partly from his own excavations there, with pupils of the teacher-training school and the gymnasium, in the autumn of 1915 and the spring of 1916. He added that the steep slope on the Rădășeni side kept collapsing and was reducing the area of the site. Among the pieces he described were a sandstone axe with an incised figure of a deer, first published by Ioan Andrieșescu in 1929, a stone hammer-axe found in 1921, and an almost complete horn of a steppe bison (Bison priscus) found in a trench. He also cited Buțureanu's unpublished manuscript La préhistoire en Roumanie (1898), which listed spearheads, arrowheads and flint knives, sandstone axes and clay weights, as well as idols in human and animal form. In 1917 a visitor listed painted pottery, clay idols, a bison horn, deer antlers and a Roman coin among the finds. Later excavations were carried out by the archaeologist Mugur Andronic.

A field survey carried out in 2010–2014 identified further sites across the commune: a Cucuteni settlement at Lămășeni–Dealul Prodănii; Early Bronze Age sites of the Horodiștea culture at Lămășeni–La Bolohan and on the hills east of Pocoleni; and settlements of the Late Bronze Age Noua culture and the Early Iron Age Gáva–Holihrady culture at Lămășeni–Puntișoară and Rădășeni–Dealul Heleștiucului, the latter also yielding Roman-period material of the Carpi and the Sântana de Mureș–Chernyakhov culture. In 2020 the archaeologist Bogdan Petru Niculică of the Bukovina Museum in Suceava identified traces of ramparts and ditches on orthophotos of the southern end of the Cetățuia hill. Drone flights and a digital terrain model made in 2021–2023 showed a fortification with several enclosures covering about 0.6 ha at the south-eastern edge of the village, at the place locally called Hârburi or Horbaza. Trial trenches dug in October 2024 found no pottery and no occupation layer, only a fragment of an iron knife, and Niculică therefore interprets the fortification as a refuge that was not permanently inhabited. In form it resembles the early medieval fortifications of the 8th–11th centuries at Dersca, Lozna and Ibănești in Botoșani County and at Hlinița, in Ukraine.

=== Middle Ages ===
The village is first mentioned, as Radeșani, in a charter of Alexander the Good dated 16 February 1424, by which the priest Iuga and his brother Nan received the neighbouring village of Buciumeni, "near Baia". The boundary ran along "the road that goes from Stan to Baia, then along the road to the stream that goes to Radeșani". On 24 April 1434 Prince Stephen, son of Alexander, confirmed to Iuga a group of villages, among them "the fourth, above Buciumeni, namely Radeșani". In 1490, before the council of Stephen the Great, Iuga's descendants sold Buciumeni, which lay "below Rădășani". The 600th anniversary of the first attestation was marked in the village in February 2024.

The original of the 1424 charter, on parchment, is held by the museum in Fălticeni. Ciurea writes that it had been kept for generations by a family in Buciumeni. Around 1907 the historian Ioan Bogdan, on behalf of the Romanian Academy, tried without success to obtain it from its owner, an old woman named Catinca, and was only allowed to read, translate and photograph it. His translation appeared in the Academy's Analele (vol. XXX, 1907–1908, p. 357). In 1914 she passed it to her son Costică, and in the spring of 1916 Ciurea, who had agreed to be his naș (wedding sponsor), received the document as a wedding gift and placed it in the museum.

The name appears in documents as Radeșani, Rădășani, Rădășiani and Rădășeni. It derives from the personal name Radeș (a form of Radu) with the suffix -eni. Historian Mihai Costăchescu wrote in 1931 that "the village is very old. Its name comes from a Radeș", and dated it to the 14th century or earlier. Linguist Daniela-Maria Ciocîrlan links the names of Lămășeni and Pocoleni to Transylvanian place names (Lămășoaia in Albac and Pocola) and suggests that their founders came from across the Carpathians. Simionescu had reached a similar conclusion in 1926: from the villagers' dress and customs he inferred that they had come "probably from Transylvania".

The village lay a few kilometres from Baia, one of the earliest towns of Moldavia, where Transylvanian Saxons had settled before and after the Mongol invasion of 1241. In Călugărița's view, the wooded hills around Rădășeni sheltered Moldavian troops before the Battle of Baia of December 1467. An 1894 description stated that the road linking Suceava and Baia ran through the Lămășeni woods and that, by local tradition, the armies of Stephen the Great had passed that way.

In 1437 Rădășeni was among the villages exempted from the tithe on orchards. In 1558 Prince Alexandru Lăpușneanu granted the village to Slatina Monastery, which he had founded. Peasant unrest is attested there in 1591. In 1613 "good men from Rădășeni" appear as witnesses in a land dispute. In 1648 Prince Vasile Lupu confirmed to a villager named Gavril his land, orchards and a fish pond on Dealul lui Dobre. The confirmation, dated 19 July 1648, also mentions "two orchards, gardens with trees, in Rădășeni".

Lămășeni is first attested in 1586, when its vataman (village headman) witnessed a boundary survey. It remained a princely village until Ștefan Tomșa II gave it to Solca Monastery, from which the logofăt Cârstian bought it back in 1625. Pocoleni is first attested as an estate in 1784. In the 18th century it belonged to Ienache Canta, who had obtained it by exchange from Râșca Monastery, and in 1812 it was listed as an abandoned village site (siliște) of the Rădășeni estate. The village itself dates from after the land distribution of 1899.

The old site of the village lay at the place called Siliște (Săliște), downstream on the village brook towards the Șomuzul Mare, where traces of a church can still be seen. Călugărița writes that the inhabitants moved gradually during the 17th and 18th centuries across the brook towards Fundoaia and the springs, around the church built in the time of Ștefan Tomșa, and that by the mid-18th century the move was still recent. On the terrace of the brook, at the place called Siliște on the boundary with Fălticeni, archaeologists have identified a Late Bronze Age settlement of the Noua culture, with Early Iron Age and Roman-period traces.

=== Ștefan Tomșa II and the church of Saint Mercurius ===
On 20 April 1743, during a boundary survey, the priest Constantin and fifteen elders of Rădășeni testified under oath that Prince Ștefan Tomșa II "had learned to read here as a small and poor child" and, on becoming prince, had built a church in the village and given the villagers a piece of land from the boundary of the market town of Baia. The surveyors then attached that land to the Rădășeni estate. Local tradition attributes the wooden church dedicated to Saint Mercurius to Tomșa. A gold spoon bearing a Slavonic inscription, in which "Io Ștefan Voievod Tomșovici" dedicated it to the church of Rădășeni, was taken by the monks of Slatina to Neamț Monastery, and the villagers had a gilded silver copy made. The historian A. D. Xenopol, who recounted the episode, called it "a fine proof of the lasting love of the past in that village, the most beautiful in all Moldavia".

=== Dispute with Slatina Monastery ===
From 1712 onwards the villagers were in a long legal dispute with Slatina Monastery. In 1737 Prince Grigore II Ghica confirmed the monastery's ownership of Rădășeni; the monks claimed that the title deeds had been lost "in times of uprisings". In 1749 the village's representatives, Ion Perjul and Gligore Pletosul, argued before the princely council that the estate was theirs by inheritance and that they owed the monastery only limited labour, while the monastery and the neighbouring minor nobles regarded them as its serfs (vecini). In 1752 the villagers lost the case and were forbidden to call themselves free landholders (răzeși). The conflict resumed repeatedly: in 1768 Prince Grigore Callimachi ordered that the villagers' documents be taken from them and torn up, and in the 1790s they again refused labour dues and the tithe on fruit trees; in 1798 the abbot complained that they had sold wine in breach of his monopoly and had cut the tap of his wine cask.

The orchards were also at issue. In 1744 Prince Ioan Mavrocordat authorised the abbot of Slatina to hold an orchard planted on the Rădășeni estate by a muscal (a Russian) who had come from Poland. In July 1768 Callimachi ruled that orchards whose owners had died without heirs or had fled passed to the monastery, and that the others remained with those who had planted them or their relatives, who owed the monastery a tithe of "one tree in ten". In 1774 Rădășeni had 98 houses, with 80 taxpayers and 18 exempt households (11 of them priests). In 1803 it had about 200 households, paying 4,212 lei a year to the monastery, and in 1816 there were 260 taxpayers.

=== Seat of Suceava county (1777–1779) ===
Under the Austro-Ottoman convention of 7 May 1775 and the boundary settlements of 1776, northern Moldavia, including the old capital Suceava, passed to the Habsburgs as Bukovina. The new border was fixed on the Suceava river at its confluence with the Siret, and Moldavia lost about 10,400 km², with the towns of Cernăuți, Siret and Suceava and over 250 villages. From the remaining part of the old county, enlarged with portions of the counties of Botoșani, Hârlău, Cârligătura, Roman and Neamț, Prince Constantine Moruzi, on the proposal of the Divan, reconstituted a county that kept the name Suceava in memory of the lost capital.

According to Serafim Ionescu (1894), "the county administration was first installed in the village of Rădășeni and later, when the market town of Șoldănești, afterwards called Fălticeni, was founded, it moved there". The county prefects (ispravnici) were the same Ienache (Ioan) Canta (1733–1795), of the Cantacuzino branch settled at Horodniceni, and Dumitrache Saulea. A princely letter of 29 September 1778 addresses them as "ispravnici of the county of Suceava". Călugărița places the seat at Rădășeni between 1777 and 1779 but notes that the prefects' presence in the village is not directly documented. The market town that took over as county seat emerged in 1779–1780: a note of 28 June 1779 records the founding of a market by Canta on the Fălticenii Vechi estate, and a charter of Moruzi of 8 August 1780 confirms the new market, named Șoldănești, on the estate of stolnic Ioniță Bașotă – the future town of Fălticeni. The memory of the county administration survived in the village's verse chronicle: "When the land of Bukovina was torn from Romania, / The old men say the county seat came here". The reconstituted county was named Suceava until 1923, then Fălticeni (1923–1929) and Baia (1929–1950).

=== 19th century ===
Until the secularisation of monastic estates in 1863 the estate remained the property of Slatina Monastery, which in 1847 leased it, together with its estates of Oprișeni, Borghinești and Pocoleni, for 70,000 lei.

Villagers took part in the movement for the Union of the Romanian Principalities. Three of them, Toader Grumăzescu, Petrea Mazilu and Toader sin Pavăl a Oanei, were members of the unionist committee of the county, formed at Fălticeni in 1856. An account published in 1907 states that Toader a Oanei of Rădășeni was elected to the ad hoc Divan of Moldavia as a unionist. After the 1864 land reform, 509 heads of family received land. The same year the commune was organised, with Grumăzescu (1828–1893) as its first mayor. He and later his son Vasile were elected mayor against the wishes of the sub-prefect. Local tradition holds that Grumăzescu led a group of villagers who were received by Prince Alexandru Ioan Cuza at Ruginoasa. Earlier accounts place the visit on New Year's Day or at Easter 1860; Călugărița argues that it must have taken place in 1864, since Cuza bought the Ruginoasa estate only in 1862 and the palace was inaugurated at Easter 1864. The neighbouring commune of Lămășeni was merged into Rădășeni in 1887. According to the commune, Lămășeni formed a separate commune in 1864–1876, 1877–1886 and 1946–1950, and in 1930–1932 it belonged to Horodniceni.

In 1894 the commune had 2,721 inhabitants in 636 families, with three churches and two schools. The village of Rădășeni had 344 houses and 1,907 inhabitants, and Lămășeni 179 houses and 814 inhabitants.

=== 20th century ===
When he visited in 1904, the historian Nicolae Iorga described Rădășeni as a village famed for growing and exporting fruit "to a greater extent than any other village in Romania", with buyers shipping its produce as far as Berlin and Prague. During the First World War, soldiers of the 56th Infantry Regiment dug trenches on Cetățuia. At the same time a new masonry church with three towers was being completed in the centre of the village.

In 1944 the Romanian Post issued a set of four semi-postal stamps dedicated to Rădășeni (Michel 793–796), printed in photogravure: 5 + 145 lei (blue), showing the wooden church with the inscription "Bis. St. Tomșa 1611 Rădășeni" and a medallion portrait of Ștefan Tomșa; 12 + 138 lei (carmine), showing the cultural centre ("Căminul"); 15 + 135 lei (red), showing women in folk dress picking fruit, with beehives and the new church in the background; and 32 + 118 lei (brown), showing the school with villagers and pupils. The surcharge went to the cultural centre, which funded the construction of the school.

As the front line approached, most of the inhabitants were evacuated to Dumbrăveni, where they remained from March until 9 September 1944. In April 1945 the mayor reported a population of 4,763 and widespread epidemics.

=== Collectivisation ===
Participation in the collectivisation of agriculture was limited in Rădășeni. In the 1950s several agricultural associations (întovărășiri) were formed: "Zori noi" in Lămășeni and "30 Decembrie" and "Victoria" in Rădășeni. In 1952 the church cantor Vasile Miron was arrested as a chiabur and sent to the Danube–Black Sea Canal labour camps. Under Decree 115/1959, 32 peasants classed as chiaburi (kulaks) were dispossessed and 74 ha passed to the state. In 1960 the collective farm had 67 member families, out of 1,159 households in the commune, and about 80 ha. The agricultural production cooperative (CAP) of Rădășeni was established on 19 March 1962. By 20 April 1962 it had 453 member families, fewer than 40% of the households in the commune.

== Demographics ==
At the 2011 census the commune had 3,575 inhabitants. Most inhabitants declared themselves Romanian (98.4%). By religion, 83.7% were Orthodox and 14.7% declared another religion. At the 2021 census the population was 3,508.

== Economy ==
Rădășeni is known for its orchards, particularly apples and pears. It lies in the Fălticeni–Rădășeni fruit-growing area, which Călugărița counts among the oldest in Romania. In 1894 orchards and gardens brought the community over 20,000 lei a year, more than its arable land, and Rădășeni pears and apples sold for 15–35 francs per 100 kg. Clover had been introduced in 1881. Before the railway was built, villagers carted fruit as far as Cernăuți and Lemberg. They also held about 200 fălci of orchards on the Mălini estate. In 1924 the village had dairies and "Bosnian" ovens for drying plums. Simionescu wrote in 1926 that the villagers' own orchards were in fact few and that they were above all "dealers in orchard fruit": they rented orchards in Fălticeni and in more distant villages, and the apples that filled their cellars had once been sold as far away as Galați. By the 1920s they were also bringing apples by rail from Sălaj and Sighet. He added that hay meadows took up more land than arable fields and that the villagers had turned to butter-making. A 1966 article noted that the Rădășeni fruit basin, which formed a single unit with the orchards of Oprișeni and Buciumeni, was regarded in the specialist literature as one of the oldest and most important in the country. The name "livada mare" (the big orchard) was still used for about 30 ha south of the village, and since the early 20th century the villagers had also produced nursery stock.

In 1908 a state fruit-tree nursery was founded at Groapa Rădășenilor on land donated by the teacher Vasile I. Lovinescu, whom Călugărița credits with establishing the first fruit-tree nursery in Romania. The nursery became an experimental station in 1939, served from 1950 as a practice ground for the pupils of the horticultural technical school, and was re-established in 1957 as the Fălticeni Fruit-Growing Research and Production Station, whose area grew from 83 ha to 850 ha by 1989. Since 2012 the agricultural college in Fălticeni has borne Lovinescu's name.

According to a 1975 monograph of the commune, Rădășeni was the first village in Suceava County to be electrified: work started in the summer of 1943, with state funds, and was completed after 1944; Lămășeni was electrified in May–July 1969, and Pocoleni, electrified in 1971, was the last village in the county. A post office opened on 1 August 1957, telephone lines reached all the villages of the commune on 22 August 1966, and a bus line from Fălticeni began running in April 1971. A natural gas well was installed on Doabra hill, at the place called La Bolohan, in the 2010s.

== Religion and traditions ==
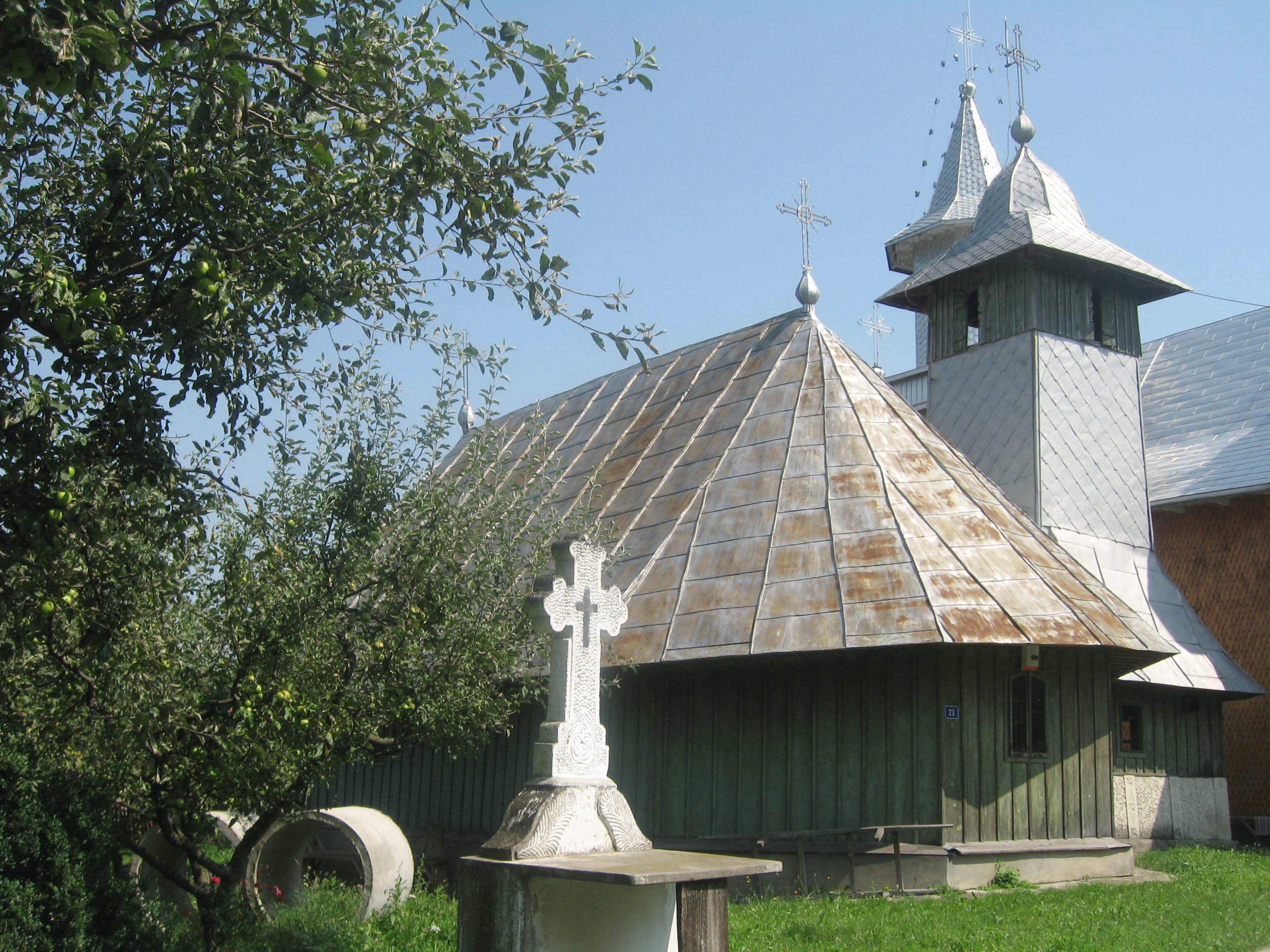
Wooden church in Lămășeni

The wooden church of Saints Mercurius and Catherine, attributed by tradition to Ștefan Tomșa II, is a listed historic monument (LMI code SV-II-m-A-05597). It was painted in 1875–1876 by the hieromonks Iulian, Chelsie and Ioan.

Between 1910 and 1921 the villagers built a new masonry church dedicated to the Holy Apostles Peter and Paul in the centre of the village, on land donated by Constantin Gavril Oanea, because the wooden church could no longer hold the congregation. The new church was consecrated on 17 October 1921. Ciurea notes that it was built "almost entirely at the villagers' expense". It houses the icon of the Virgin "Portărița", a copy of the icon at Iviron Monastery painted on Mount Athos in the late 19th century for archimandrite Veniamin Piticariu, abbot of Râșca Monastery. According to tradition, the icon was brought to Rădășeni in procession during the drought of 1921 and remained in the village, and the archimandrite was buried beside the church in 1922. Ciurea (1924) and Marian Ionel Palade (2012) record the icon as the archimandrite's gift. The church was consecrated again on 16 July 1995, after repairs, in the presence of three bishops. After a further restoration it was reconsecrated on 23 May 2021 by seven bishops, among them Timotei Prahoveanul, a native of the village, and the icon was restored at the workshops of the Romanian Patriarchate.

In the interwar period Rădășeni became one of the centres of the Old Calendarist movement, which rejected the revised calendar: the hieromonk Glicherie Tănase settled first in the village. According to Constantin Bujor's history of the Old Calendar Church, the New Calendar parish priest locked the village church against the Old Calendarists, who then built their own wooden church, also dedicated to Saints Peter and Paul. In his account, Glicherie laid the foundation stone on 8 May 1932 and the church went up in 28 days; an attempt to set it on fire that June was foiled by Vasile Onofrei, and the church was consecrated on 14 October 1933. Bujor also relates that on one of the church's feast days the mayor, Gostică Grigorescu, sent the men to the prefecture in Fălticeni on the pretext of approving the congregation, while some forty gendarmes tried to seize Glicherie, who was freed by Vasile Onofrei and other villagers. Old Calendarists were persecuted throughout the 1930s. In July 1935 about a thousand of them, from Rădășeni and the surrounding villages, demonstrated in front of the Baia county prefecture in Fălticeni. By Council of Ministers decision no. 2617 of 4 November 1936 the government confiscated Old Calendarist churches and prayer houses. Bujor states that the Old Calendarist church in Rădășeni was dismantled and moved to another village, where it served as a New Calendar church. On the night of 14–15 February 1952 the Securitate arrested, among others, the Old Calendar priests Gheorghe Nichita and Nicolae Onofrei of Rădășeni. Silvestru Onofrei, Metropolitan of the Old Calendar Orthodox Church of Romania from 1985 to 1992, was born in the village, into a family that gave that church many priests and monks. An Old Rite cemetery survives.

In the early 20th century the village feast (hram) of Saint Mercurius was held on the Wednesday after Easter. In 1894 Lămășeni had two churches: a masonry one dedicated to Saints Constantine and Helen, built in 1850 by Anastasia Cichirdiceasa, and a wooden church of Saint Nicholas.

In 1907 V. A. Forescu described customs specific to the village: marriages were contracted almost only within Rădășeni or with people from Bosanci, villagers who missed church three times in a row were placed in a wooden yoke at the church door, and the tavern opened only after the service had ended.

In 1894 people from the surrounding villages nicknamed the inhabitants of Rădășeni perjeni (also perjari or perjeri), after perji, the regional Moldavian name for plum trees, which the villagers had grown and traded for centuries. The village's verse chronicle says that "the perjeni believe that when God made the world, they came out of the earth together with the plum trees". Neighbours use a saying attributed to the "perjari", "two lei the plum, and give back the stone!", to label them as "tight with their purse". Călugărița rejects the label and reads the saying instead as a sign of how highly the villagers prized their fruit.

=== Inhabitants and the village feast ===
Descriptions from the late 19th and early 20th centuries dwell on the appearance of the inhabitants and their households. Ionescu (1894) described them as "well built, tall, broad-chested, clever, steady, hard-working, very composed and keen traders", "pleasant in speech and dress, clean and well dressed". He added that "the women vie with their husbands in good habits" and that "order and cleanliness reign" in every yard. Forescu (1907) noted that the men wore no beards and rarely got drunk, while the women, "small, not beautiful, but with pleasant faces", had a type and dress by which old Suceava families recognised them at once; they were "very honest and good mothers", and the first greens, dairy produce and butter they brought to market were "particularly sought after by the townspeople". Women entered the tavern only to take their husbands home and followed a funeral only for a close relative. On feast days they gathered at evening work parties (șezători). The houses, which Forescu considered better than those in other villages, were clean, well painted, with decorated windows and with fenced yards and orchards.

In 1924 Ciurea called Rădășeni "a model village as far as households go", with "hard-working, clean and enterprising people". Two years later Simionescu described it as "a wonderful village, such as few are in all of hilly Moldavia", and its people as "a nest of hard-working, thrifty people, but different in dress and above all in their economic life from the rest of the Moldavians around them". He noted that nearly all the houses had shingle roofs and were "neatly whitewashed, with blue bands along the porch", that every household had a stable and a barn, and that the villagers wore boots rather than peasant sandals. He also observed that they did not marry into other villages, "except for those of Bosancea in Bukovina".

The church feast of Saint Mercurius ("Mercuriea" or "Nercorie"), held on the fourth day of Easter, was the one great celebration of the year and drew "a noisy crowd" from Fălticeni and the surrounding villages. According to Forescu, the village elders went to Fălticeni beforehand, with ritual breads and choice pears and apples, to invite the county's boyars; bands of lăutari came from Fălticeni and Botoșani, and a large swing with eight painted, curtained seats was set up in front of the tavern, where young men sometimes bid against each other until a place beside a girl cost as much as five gold coins (60 lei). The hora at Rădășeni was danced differently from that of other villages: only by young men and girls, holding hands and barely moving, "one step to the left and two to the right". The fast dances were danced only by men, and a young man was not allowed to take a girl by the waist. Mihail Sadoveanu described the feast in Oameni și locuri (1908).

=== Fluierași ensemble ===
In the 1960s villagers from Rădășeni and Lămășeni, recruited largely among shepherds by the music teacher Gheorghe Covatariu, formed a fluier (shepherd's flute) ensemble that popularised local tunes such as "Hora Rădășenilor" and "Sârba de la Lămășeni". The ensemble won a mention in 1967 and a gold medal in 1970 at national competitions, reached the final of the national festival Cântarea României in Iași in 1983, and was invited to play for Nicolae Ceaușescu. Its leader was the folk singer and poet Grigore Popovici (1923–2011). A former trader in Dorna and Bacău, Popovici had joined the Legionary Movement in his youth. In 1952, after striking the president of the local people's council in the village tavern, he was arrested by the Securitate and held in its cells in Fălticeni. Călugărița relates that on leaving prison Popovici wore a cap on which he had inscribed the slogan "Liberté, égalité, fraternité, minciunité" (from Romanian minciună, "lie"). After 2000 he published several volumes of anti-communist verse, anecdotes and memoirs. From the mid-1980s until around 2000 the tradition was continued by pupils of the Lămășeni school under teacher Gheorghe Păun.

== Education ==
A school building was erected in 1858 by Vasile Canta. Its first teacher was the priest Gheorghe Lateș, who taught there until 1891. In 1894 the school was described as "re-established in 1858, being the oldest school in the county", and local tradition recorded an earlier school for church singers. Lămășeni had a school from 1864. A new school building in Rădășeni was completed in the 1920s with funding from the Ministry of Education.

== In literature ==
Rădășeni appears in several literary works. In Memories of My Boyhood, Ion Creangă recalls that, as a pupil at the catechists' school in Fălticeni, he lodged with a cobbler "in Rădășeni street" and spent evenings at "the tavern of the vornic's daughter from Rădășeni, where more people gathered for love of the tavern-keeper than for the wine"; in a corner of her room lay "a heap of royal apples and Rădășeni pears, which keep until after Easter". He also describes a holiday in "Rădășeni, a large, beautiful and rich village", where he danced at three horas in a single day: "the lads barely swayed in the dance, and the hora turned very slowly", and the girls did not wait to be asked but broke into the ring wherever they pleased.

Sadoveanu, whose house in Fălticeni stood on the street named after the village, wrote about Rădășeni in several books. In Nada Florilor he describes the wooden church as "the most important monument of the village: a little old wooden church, lower and darker than all the houses", where "only once a year, at the feast, on the fourth day after Easter", the villagers held "the most abundant feast in the county, with stuffed cabbage rolls a pound each, tied with thread, and polenta bigger than the mill wheel", and notes that "their Saint Mercurius is just like Mercury, the pagan god, painted in the icon with wings on his helmet and his shoes". He also records an old man's toast at the feast cursing the "princely upstarts and flatterers" who had "swallowed" the villagers' land. Elsewhere in the book the narrator, approaching the village in spring, observes that "all the apple trees in the gardens were in blossom", and explains that "in those parts only the Rădășeni people, the kin of Oanea, had remained free and unsubjected to the boyars", although their old estate had been encroached upon by the princes' officials and, impoverished, they lived by "the apple trade". Contemporaries identified the priest Tărăboi of Crâșma lui moș Precu (1904) with Grigore Lovinescu, priest of the church of Saint Mercurius. Sadoveanu's daughter Profira described in Planeta părăsită the Saint Mercurius feast she attended as a child, with a long table laid beside the church. Xenopol published the article "O excursie la Rădășeni" (An excursion to Rădășeni) in the magazine Familia.

== Notable people ==
- Nicolae N. Beldiceanu (1881–1923), short-story writer, born in Rădășeni
- Valeriu Neculăeasa (1898–1975), archimandrite, born in Lămășeni; abbot of Vorona, Râșca, Slatina, Curtea de Argeș and Dealu monasteries, and refounder of Predeal Monastery (1942)
- Silvestru Onofrei (1924–1992), Metropolitan of the Old Calendar Orthodox Church of Romania
- Timotei Aioanei (Timotei Prahoveanul; born 1966), vicar bishop of the Archdiocese of Bucharest, a native of the village
- Ciprian Tudosă (born 1997), rower, Olympic silver medallist in the men's coxless pair at the 2020 Summer Olympics in Tokyo, who spent his childhood in Rădășeni; honorary citizen of the commune

== Bibliography ==
- Bianu, Vasile (1926). Însemnări din războiul României Mari (in Romanian). Vol. I. Cluj: Institutul de Arte Grafice Ardealul.
- Bujor, Constantin (1999). 65 de ani de persecuție a Bisericii Ortodoxe Române de stil vechi (octombrie 1924 – decembrie 1989) [65 years of persecution of the Romanian Old Calendar Orthodox Church (October 1924 – December 1989)] (in Romanian). Editura Schimbarea la Față.
- Călugărița, Todirel (2024). Rădășeni (note pentru o monografie care n-a mai fost scrisă) [Rădășeni (notes for a monograph that was never written)] (in Romanian). Gura Humorului: Editura SMArt. ISBN 978-606-8968-47-6.
- Ciocîrlan, Daniela-Maria (2015). "Atestarea și semnificația denominativă a toponimelor din comuna Rădășeni, județul Suceava" [The attestation and naming meaning of the place names of Rădășeni commune, Suceava County]. Analele Universității "Alexandru Ioan Cuza" din Iași, Secțiunea IIIe: Lingvistică (in Romanian). LXI: 61–80. ISSN 1221-8448.
- Ciurea, V. (1924). Călăuza județului Folticeni [Guide to Fălticeni County] (in Romanian). Fălticeni: Institutul de Arte Grafice M. Saidman.
- Ciurea, V. (1933). "Aperçu des antiquités préhistoriques du département de Baia. La collection du Musée de Folticeni". Dacia (in French). III–IV: 46–48.
- Costăchescu, Mihai (1931). Documentele moldovenești înainte de Ștefan cel Mare (in Romanian). Vol. I.
- Creangă, Ion (2014). Amintiri din copilărie. Povești. Povestiri (in Romanian). Bucharest: Humanitas. ISBN 978-973-50-4351-3.
- Din tezaurul documentar sucevean. Catalog de documente 1393–1849 (in Romanian). Bucharest: Direcția Generală a Arhivelor Statului. 1983.
- Drăgușanul, Ion (2021). Povestea așezărilor sucevene [The story of the settlements of Suceava] (PDF) (in Romanian).
- Gafincu, Alexandru (2014). "Cercetări de suprafață în bazinul mijlociu al Șomuzului Mare" [Surface surveys in the middle basin of the Șomuzul Mare]. Arheologia Moldovei (in Romanian). XXXVII: 229–247.
- Ionescu, Serafim (1894). Dicționar geografic al județului Suceava [Geographical dictionary of Suceava County] (in Romanian). Bucharest: Socec.
- Niculăiasa, Mihai (1975). Comuna Rădășeni. Micromonografie (in Romanian).
- Simionescu, I. (1926). Lecturi geografice. E. Sate din România [Geographical readings. E. Villages of Romania]. Biblioteca de popularizare a științii (in Romanian). Bucharest: Casa Școalelor.
- Teodor, Dan Gh.; Ioniță, Ion (1967). "Cercetări arheologice în Podișul Sucevei" [Archaeological research on the Suceava Plateau]. Arheologia Moldovei (in Romanian). V: 309–325.
