= Târgului River =

Târgului River may refer to:

- Râul Târgului, a tributary of the Râul Doamnei in Argeș County, Romania
- Târgul, a tributary of the river Șomuzul Mare in Suceava County, Romania
- Râul Târgului, a tributary of the Suceava in Suceava County, Romania
