= Leucușești =

Leucuşeşti may refer to several villages in Romania:

- Leucuşeşti, a village in Preutești Commune, Suceava County
- Leucuşeşti, a village in Bethausen Commune, Timiș County
