= Palace of Culture (Iași) =

Heritage site in Iași County, Romania

Palace of Culture; Princely Palace Palatul Culturii; Palatul domnesc
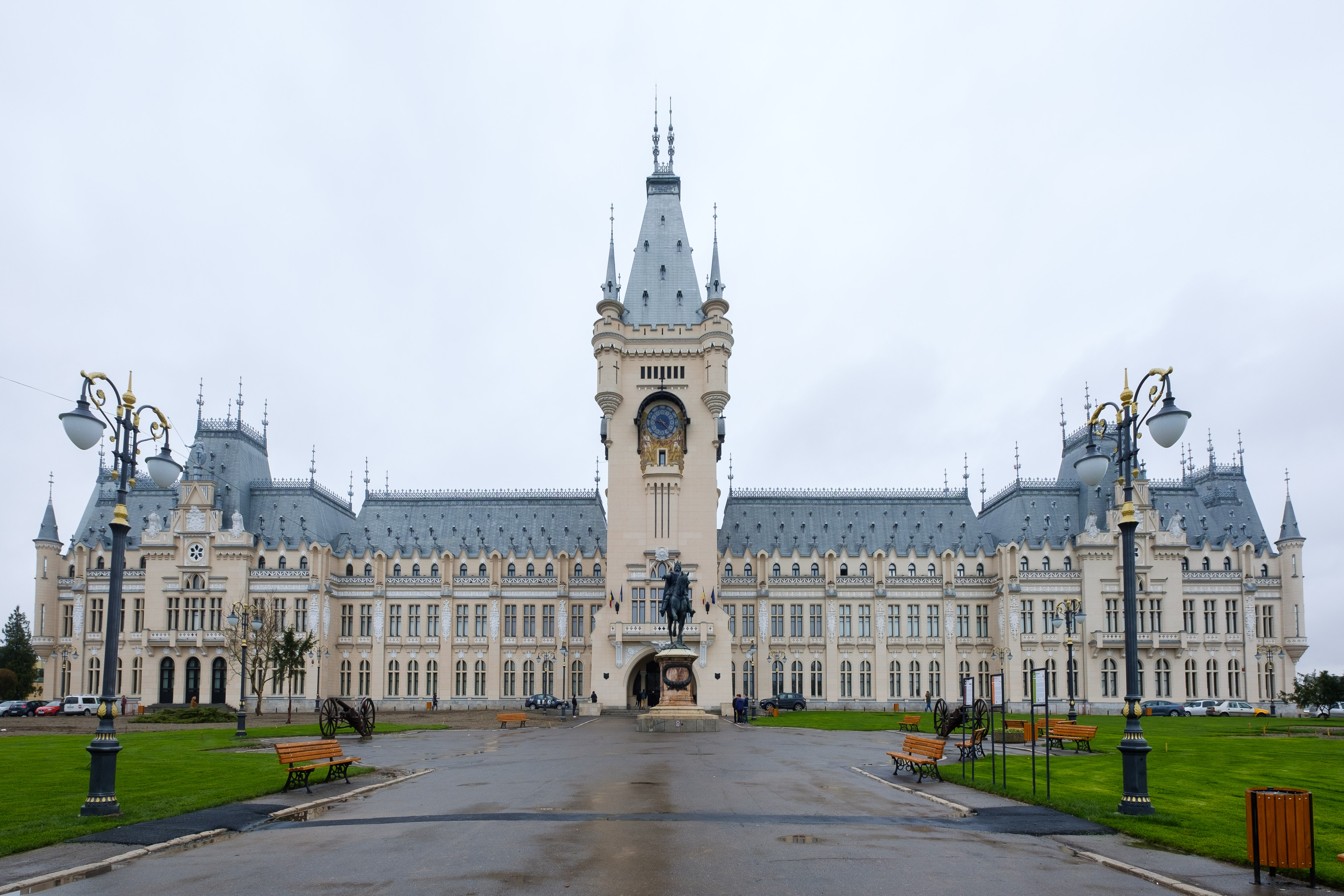
- Palace of Culture
- Interactive map of the Palace of Culture; Princely Palace; Palatul Culturii; Palatul domnesc area

General information
- Architectural style: neo-Gothic
- Location: Iași, Romania
- Coordinates: 47.15739°N 27.58695°E
- Construction started: 1906
- Inaugurated: 11 October 1925

Height
- Height: 55 m (180 ft)

Technical details
- Floor area: 34,236 m^{2} (368,510 sq ft)

Design and construction
- Architects: Ion D. Berindei; Filip Xenopol; Grigore Cerchez

Website
- palatulculturii.ro

Princely Palace of Moldavia Palatul Ocârmuirii Moldovei
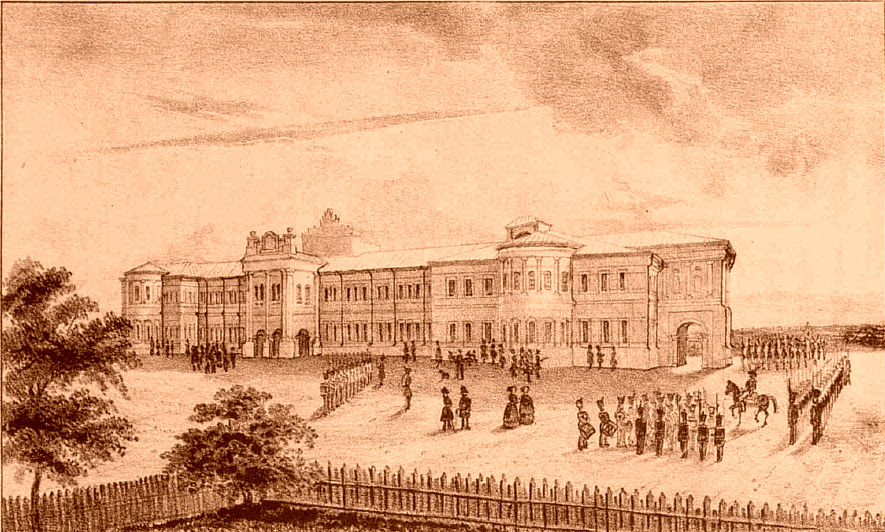
- Princely Palace during the first decades of the 19th century
- Interactive map of the Princely Palace of Moldavia; Palatul Ocârmuirii Moldovei area

General information
- Architectural style: Neoclassical
- Location: Iași, România
- Coordinates: 47.15739°N 27.58695°E
- Construction started: 1803
- Inaugurated: 28 August 1806
- Renovated: 1841–1843; 1880–1883
- Closed: 1906 (for reconstruction)

Design and construction
- Architect: Johan Freywald

Renovating team
- Architect: Nicolae Singurov (1841)

The Palace of Culture (Romanian: Palatul Culturii) is an edifice located in Iași, Romania. The building served as the Administrative and Justice Palace until 1955, when its designation and use was changed, and assigned to the four museums nowadays united under the name of Moldavia National Museum Complex. Also, the building houses the Cultural Heritage Conservation-Restoration Centre, and hosts various exhibitions and other events.

The Palace of Culture is listed in the National Register of Historic Monuments.

== History ==
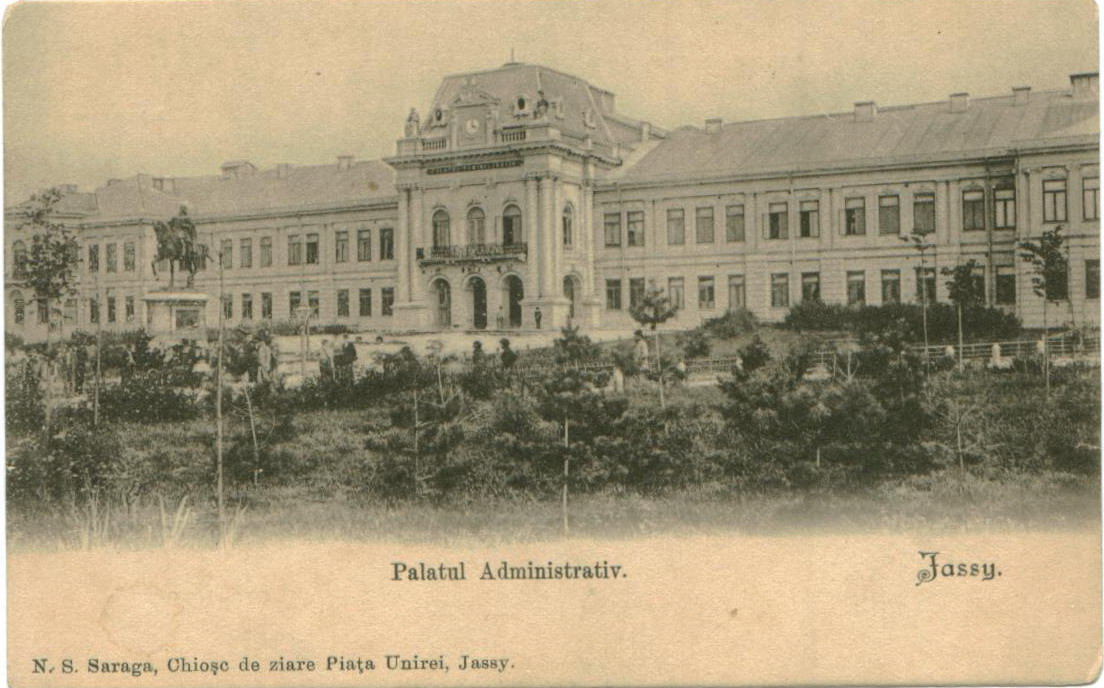
The former Princely Palace of Moldavia (later renamed Administrative Palace) after the last renovation (1883)

Located in the perimeter of the medieval Princely Court of Moldavia (from 1434), the construction was conceived as a rebuilding and expansion project of the former Princely Palace of Moldavia, dated to the time of Prince Alexandru Moruzi (1803–1806, architect Johann Freywald), and renovated by Prince Mihail Sturdza (1841–1843, architect Nicolai Sungurov), from which it preserved the foundations and first two floors. It was from this latter building that the Palace inherited the legend of the 365 rooms, as many as the days within one year.

The Romanian architect I.D. Berindei was assigned to plan and conduct the rebuilding process. Unlike the old palace, built in a neoclassical style, Berindei chose to design it in a flamboyant Neo-Gothic style.

Started in 1906–1907, the reconstruction works were halted during World War I, due to the limitation of resources, but the unfinished building sheltered Romanian and Russian troops, and different public institutions and military hospitals. The monument was finally completed on 11 October 1925, and officially inaugurated one year later, by King Ferdinand I of Romania.

The building housed the County Law Court and other public institutions until 1955, when it received an exclusive cultural function. During World War II, the Palace sheltered German troops, and then, Soviet troops.

In 1975–1977, the wood bridging from the last floor was replaced with a cement one, fixed with steel netting. The new bridging sustained the monument during the earthquake of 1977, but the bridging from the first floor, the walls, the ornaments and the relief works were affected. A large-scale restoration project, considered one of the most complex in Romania since 1990, began in 2008. The main works were completed in April 2016.

Between 1955 and 2010, the Palace of Culture also hosted the main branch of the Iași County Library.

== Architecture ==
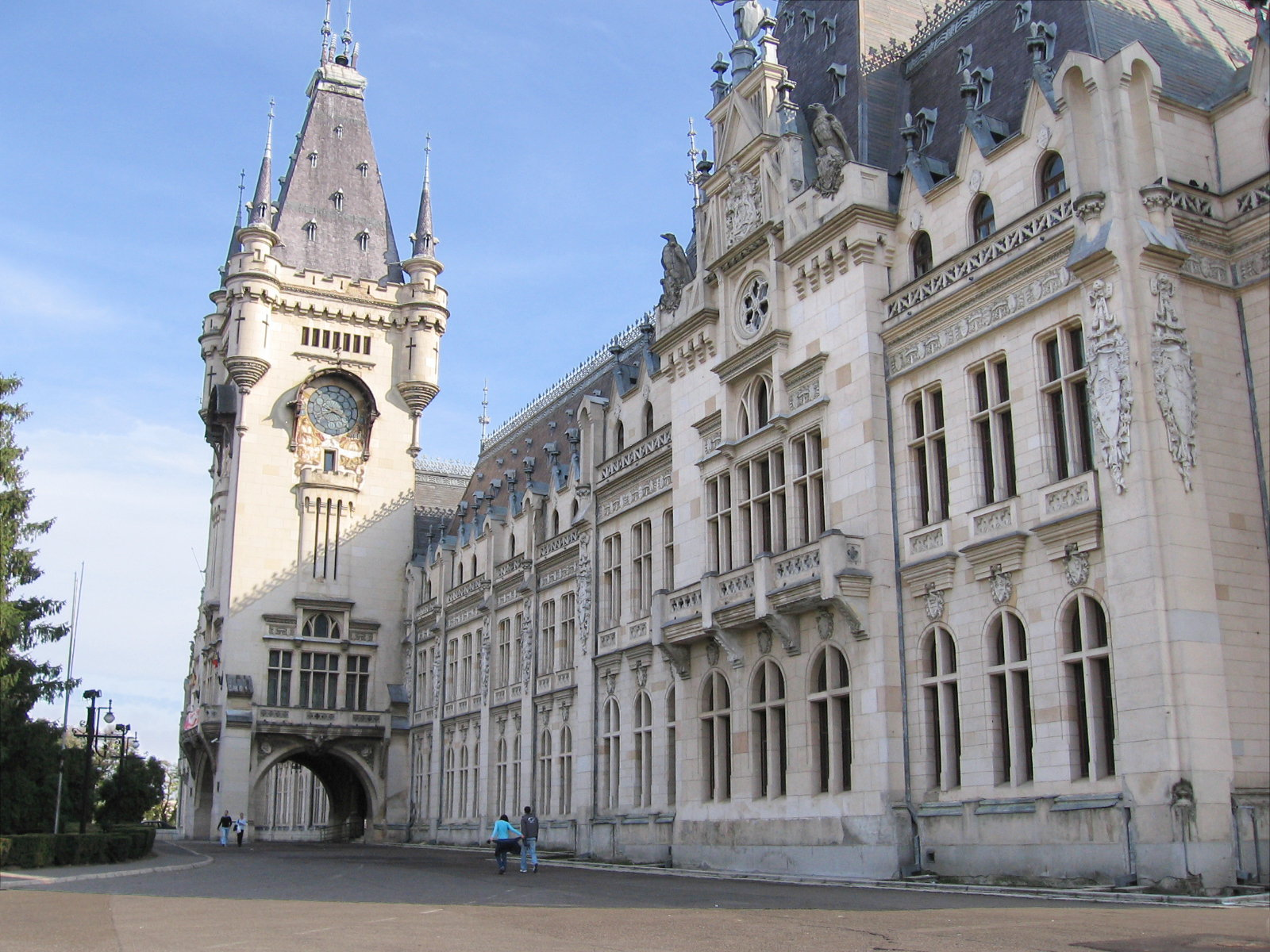
A closer view of the Palace of Culture

The Palace has 298 large rooms with a total area of 34,236 m^{2} (368,510 sq ft), 92 windows in the front part of the building and another 36 inside the building.

Decoratively, the central hall shows a figurative mosaic including various representations of a gothic bestiary, concentrically arranged: two-headed eagles, dragons, griffons, lions. The hall is superposed by a glass ceiling room, where initially a greenhouse was arranged.

In spite of its archaic-looking design, the Palace was designed so to integrate modern materials and technologies. Thus, the stone blocks were replaced with light and much cheaper materials. Besides, some rooms were decorated using a special material licensed by Henri Coandă, under the name of bois-ciment and imitating the oak wood. Decorative ironmongery elements are also remarkable and they can be admired for instance on the doors of the Voivodes’ Hall. The building was also equipped with high-tech facilities for those times, such as electric lighting, (pneumatic) heating, ventilation system, thermostat, vacuum cleaners, which were all directed from the machinery room, at the underground level. Taking also into account the 14 fires that affected the previous buildings, Berindei (the main architect) treated the wooden structure of the attic with an ignifugeous product called orniton, while for the roof he used a special material, named eternite.

=== Clock Tower ===
The entrance of the palace is through a great donjon tower, with crenels and alcoves dominated by an eagle with open wings. The tower is the central architectural piece of the palace. On each of the three exposed sides there is a face of the clock with a diameter of 3.25 m (11 ft). The clock faces are decorated with stained glass representing the 12 astrological signs. Two young men dressed in national costumes, are painted on the sides of the clock faces guarding the clock (design element inspired from the Peleș Castle). The stained glass windows and the cross shaped crenelations are electrically illuminated during the night. The Carillon in the tower has 8 bells that are singing each hour the song "Hora Unirii" with the help of a drum with 69 pins.

== Moldova National Museum Complex ==
The "Moldova" National Museum Complex (Romanian: Complexul Muzeal Național "Moldova") hosts four museums located in the Palace of Culture: Art Museum, Moldavia's History Museum, Ethnographic Museum of Moldavia, and "Ștefan Procopiu" Science and Technique Museum. The Museums also comprise their own stores and libraries, as well as halls for temporary exhibitions.

=== Art Museum ===
The Art Museum, founded in 1860, is the oldest and has the largest art collection in Romania, with more than 8,700 works, out of which 1,000 belong to the national and universal patrimony. Located at the first floor of the palace, it has 24 rooms for permanent exhibitions, arranged in three galleries (Universal Art Gallery, Romanian Modern Art Gallery and Contemporary Art Gallery). The galleries contain works by artists such as Caravaggio, Paolo Veronese, Pietro Liberi, Carlo Dolci, Salvator Rosa, Francesco Solimena, Bartolomé Esteban Murillo, Anthony van Dyck, Jan Both, Bartholomeus van der Helst, Egbert van Heemskerk II, Nicolas Poussin, Philippe de Champaigne, Eustache Le Sueur, Guillaume Coustou, François Boucher, and many others.

=== Moldavia's History Museum ===
The Moldavia's History Museum was founded in 1916 and offers more than 48,000 objects from various fields: archaeology, numismatics, decorative art, ancient books, documents, etc. One of the oldest items, a 70,000-year-old mammoth skull, is from the Middle Palaeolithic Era. Among other items of significance are pottery from the Cucuteni culture, Dacian, Sarmatian, Gothic, and Roman artifacts, and armory and other items of the Middle Ages. The History Museum is located inside the palace in the west wing of the ground floor, and is the continuation of the Antiquity Museum founded by Orest Tafrali in 1916. It has four sections, prehistory and ancient history, medieval history, modern history and contemporary history, presenting the main aspects of the development of the communities in the area from the Paleolithic time to the World War II.

The "Union Museum" and "Mihail Kogălniceanu Memorial Museum", in Iași, "Al. I. Cuza Memorial Palace" in Ruginoasa, and the "Archaeological Reserve of Cucuteni", are also coordinated by the Moldavia's History Museum.

=== Ethnographic Museum of Moldavia ===
The Ethnographic Museum of Moldavia, founded in 1943, owns more than 13,000 objects depicting the Romanian advance through the ages. The Moldavian Museum of Ethnography is located in the West side of the Palace, on the first and second floor. One can admire here the objects used by the inhabitants of Moldavia in their every day activities: in agriculture, viticulture, raising animals, fishing, hunting, apiculture. One can also see interiors of peasant houses, devices used for pottery, weaving, wood processing, mask collections, traditional costumes. Many of these exhibits are more than 100 years old.

The museum, also, coordinates the Wine and Vineyard Museum in Hârlău.

=== Science and Technology Museum ===
The "Ștefan Procopiu" Science and Technique Museum, with a collection of more than 8,500 objects, was founded in 1955 as the "Polytechnical Museum" and renamed, in 1994, after the physicist Ștefan Procopiu. It is home to Energetics, Sound Recording and Playback (unique within Romania), Telecommunications, Mineralogy - Cristalography, and Computers sections.

The "Poni-Cernătescu" Memorial Museum in Iași, is also under the direct coordination of the Science and Technique Museum.

== Other attractions ==
Besides the four museums, The Palace of Culture also houses some other attractions, such as the Gothic Room, which contains a mosaic that presents a medieval bestiarum (gryphons, bicephalous eagles, lions). There is also the Voivodes' Room, located on first floor, where there are the portraits of Moldavia's rulers and Romania's kings, starting with Decebalus and Trajan, as well as paintings by Ștefan Dimitrescu and his students. Then there is "Henri Coandă" Room, which was named after the carvings and relief works made by the famous Romanian inventor of a cement invented by him. On the right there is the Turnul de Strajă (the Watch Tower), reminiscence of the old Princely Court of Iași, along with the galleries underneath the court of the palace. On the left there is a collection of capitals and other stone architectonic elements grouped in a lapidarium. The hall is superposed by a glass ceiling room, where initially a greenhouse was arranged. In front of the palace there is the equestrian statue of Stephen the Great, framed by two Krupp cannons, trophies from the Romanian War of Independence.

== Gallery ==
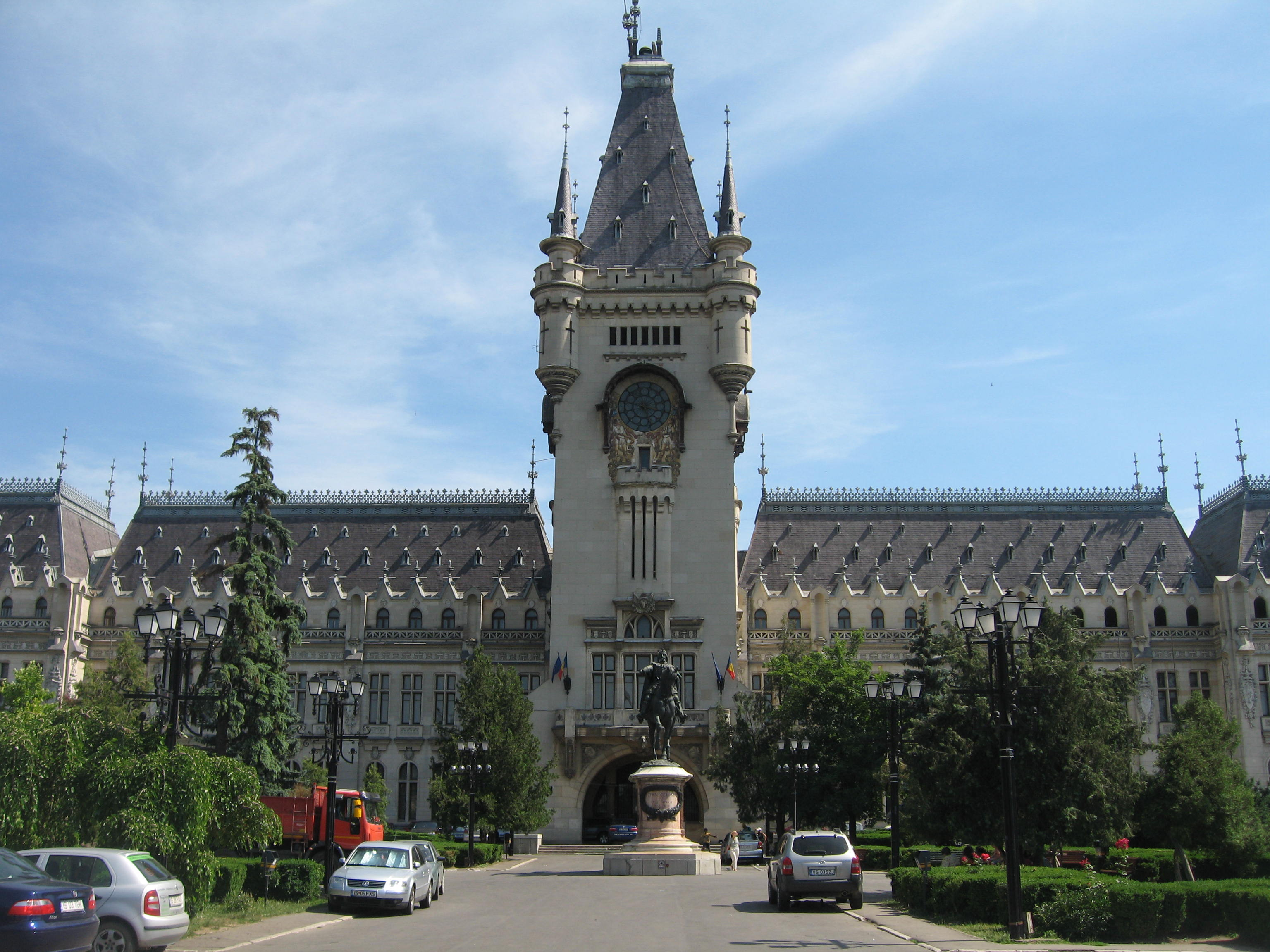
Front view from the Palace Square

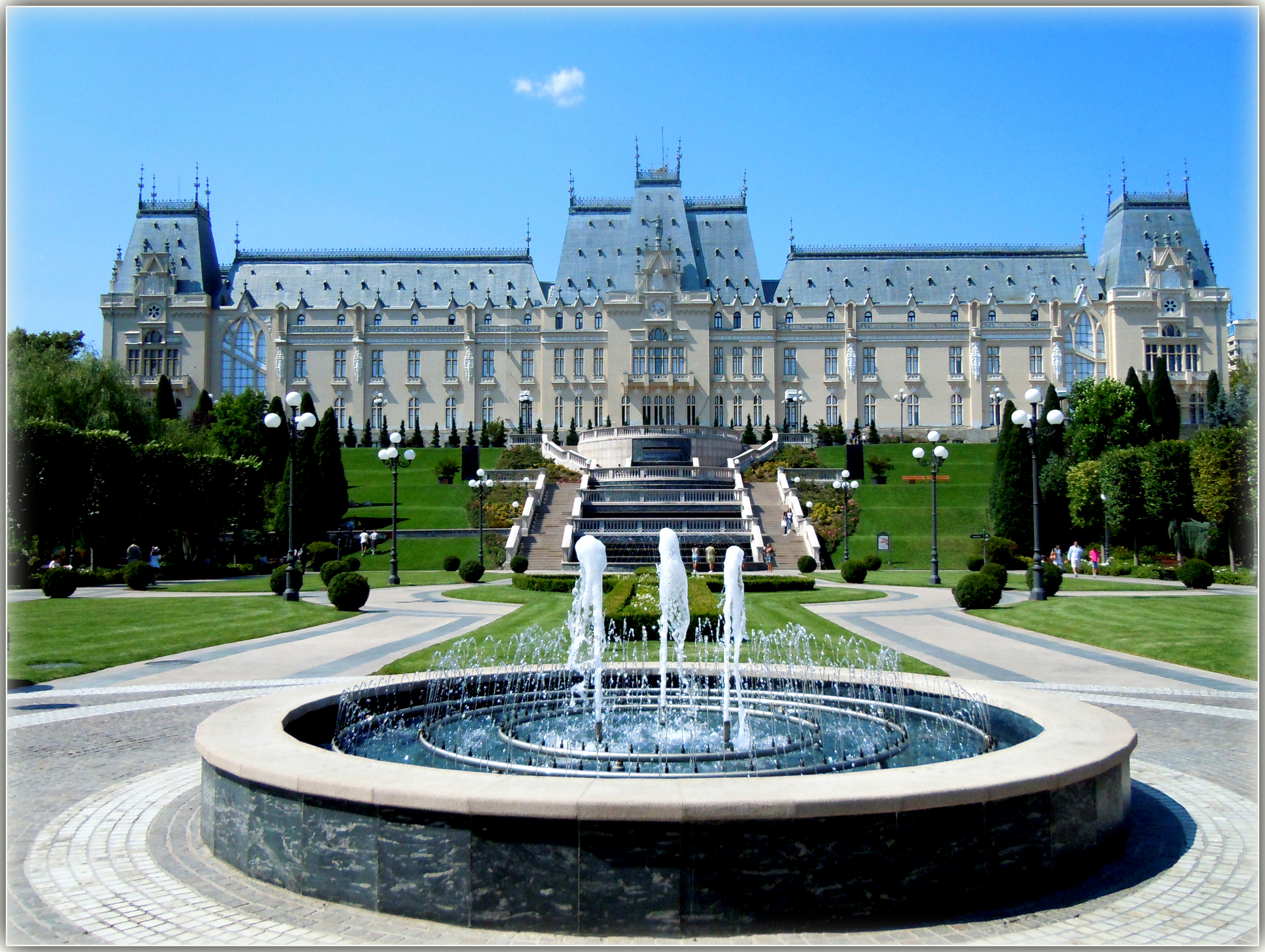
Rear view from the Palas Garden

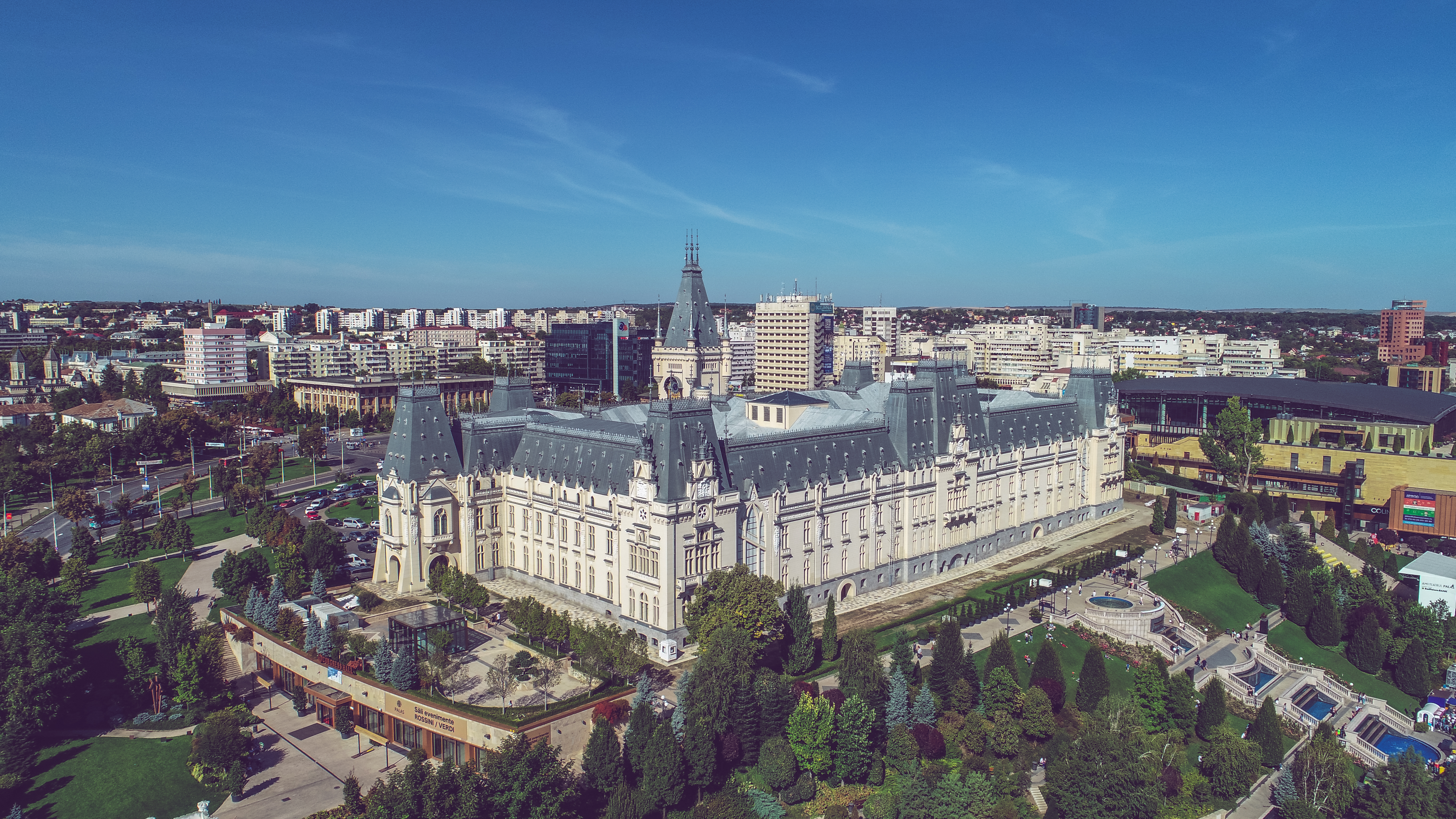
Aerial view

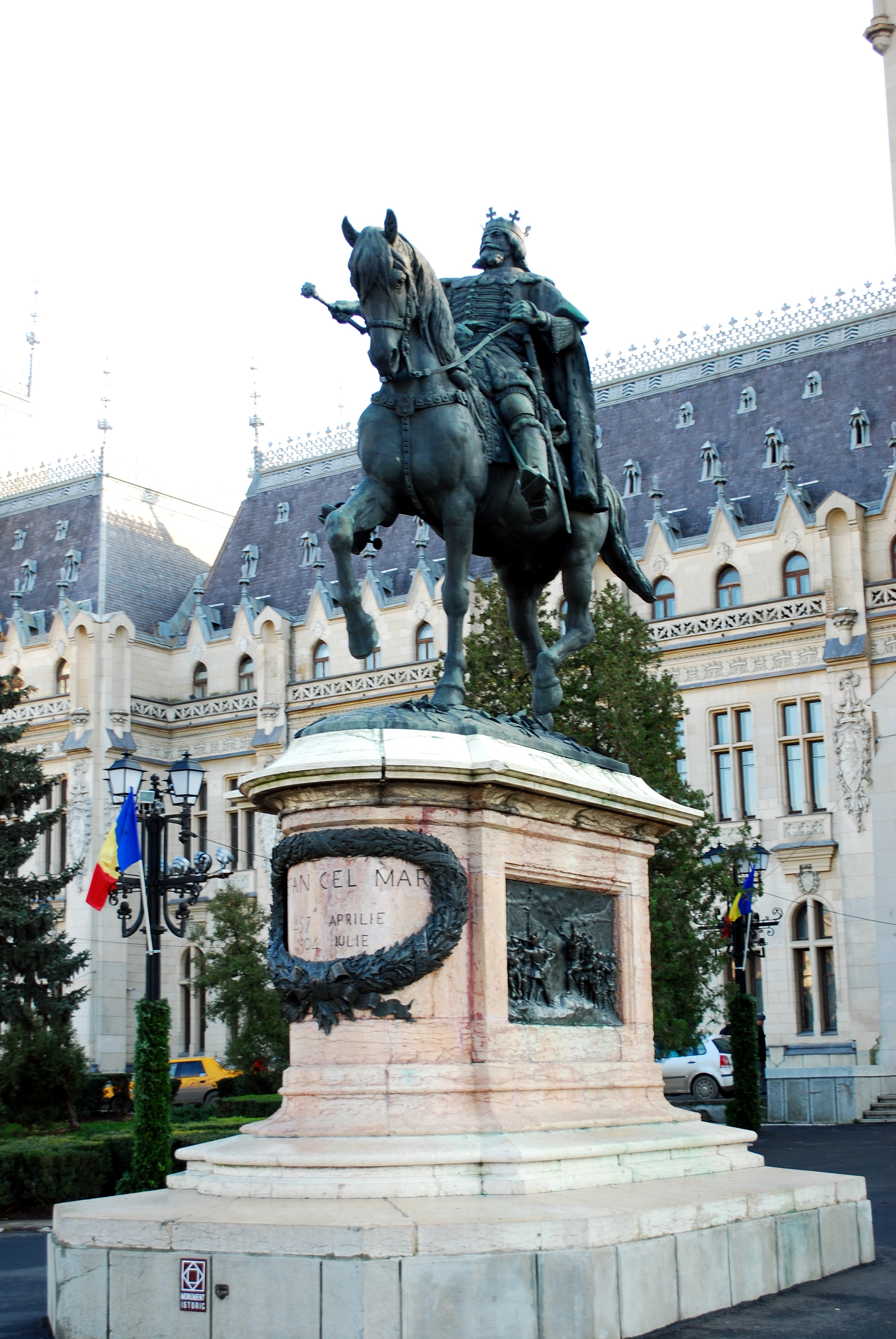
Statue of Stephen the Great

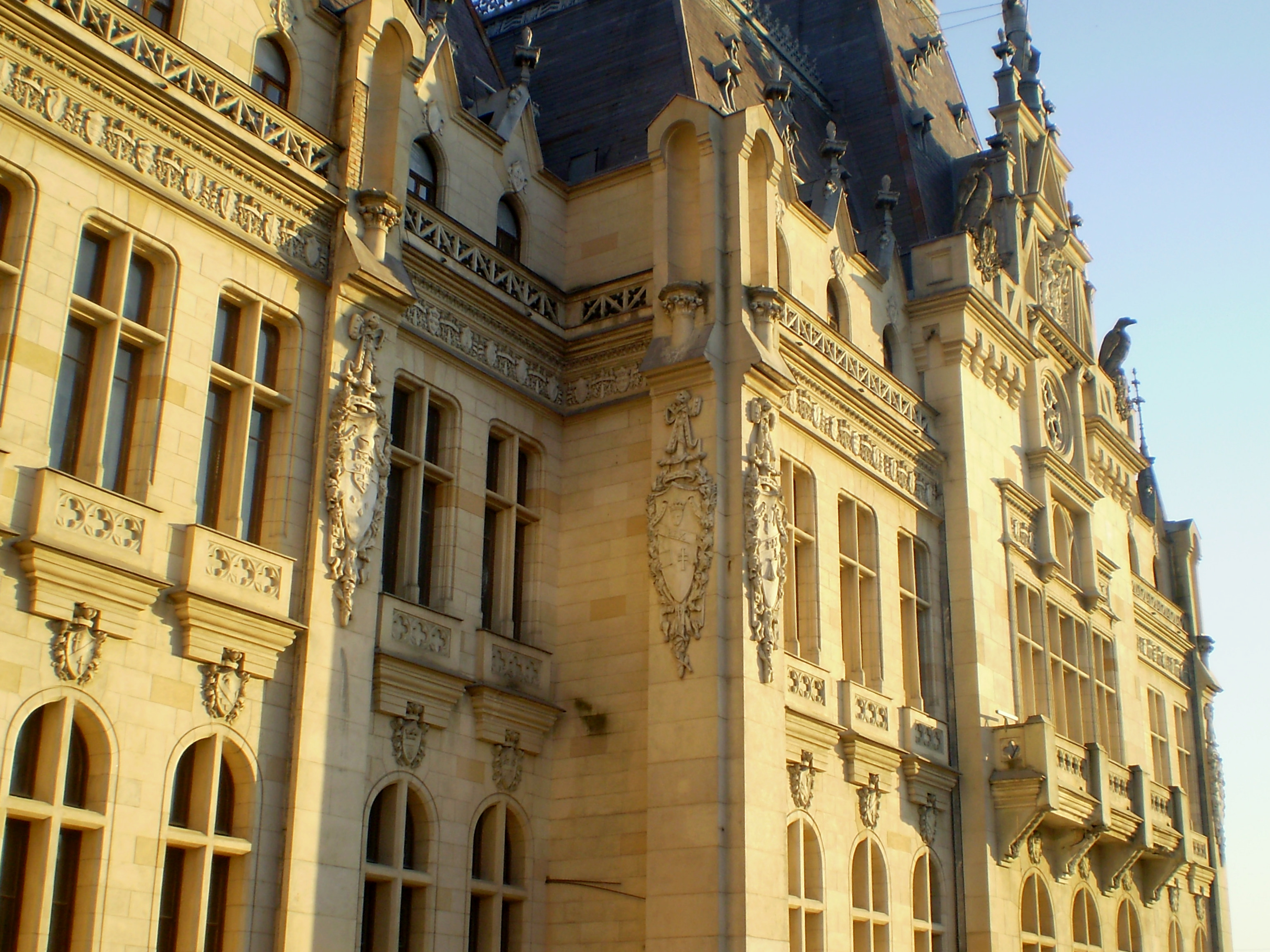
Details

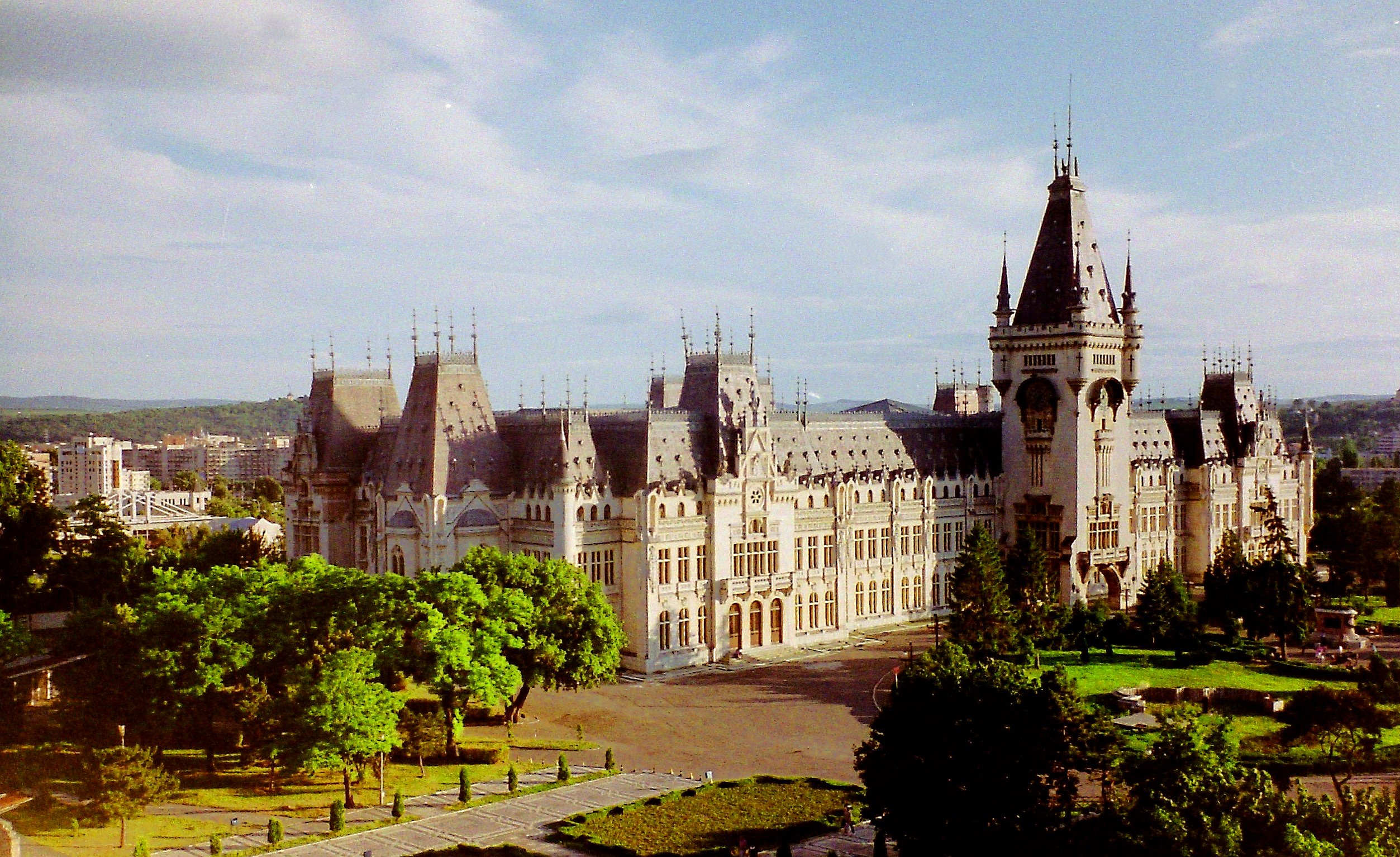
General view

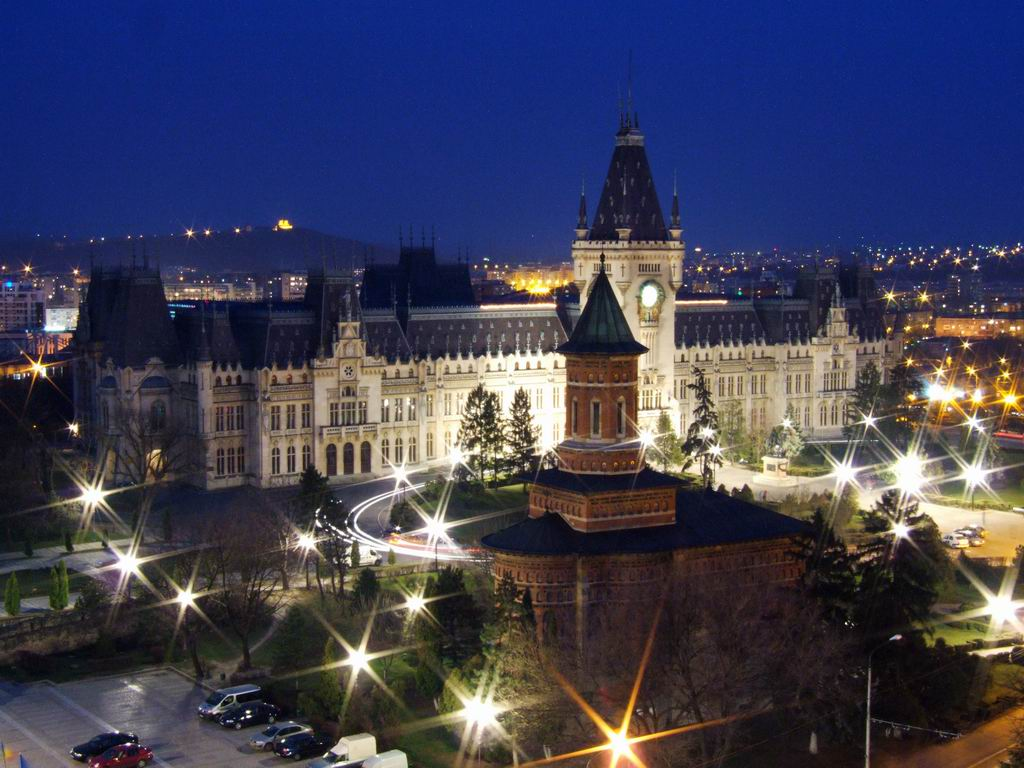
Palace Square and Princely Saint Nicholas Church

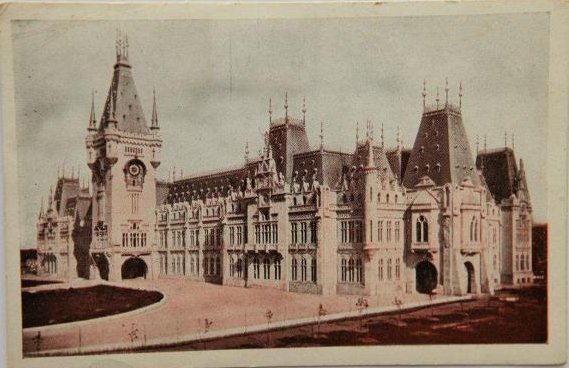
Interwar postcard

== See also ==
- Seven Wonders of Romania
