= Vătavu =

Vătavu may refer to:

- Marin Vătavu (born 1982), Romanian footballer
- Vătavu River, river in Romania
