= Nicolae N. Beldiceanu =

Romanian short story writer

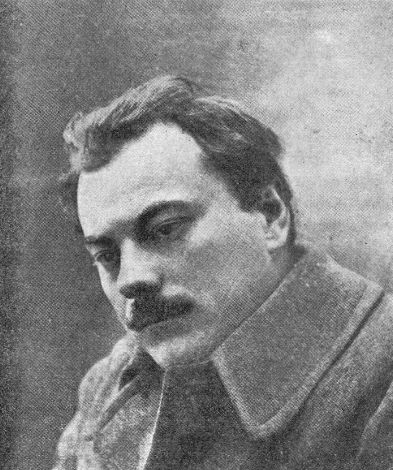
Beldiceanu in 1912

Nicolae N. Beldiceanu (May 15, 1881–June 9, 1923) was a Romanian short story writer.

Born in Rădășeni, Suceava County, his parents were Nicolae Beldiceanu and his wife Aglaia (née Lateș). He studied at the National College in Iași, where one of his classmates was Mihail Sadoveanu, with whom he would later translate Ivan Turgenev's Hunting Sketches. His first book was the 1905 Chipuri de la mahala; this was followed by Cea dintâi iubire (1906), Maica Melania (1909), Povestiri mărunte (1909), La un han, odată... (1911), Neguri (1911), Chilia dragostei (1913) Fetița doctorului (1914), Fântâna balaurului (1921) and Ospățul (1921). Magazines to which he contributed include Sămănătorul, Viața Românească, Viața socială, Flacăra, Luceafărul and Însemnări literare. He died in Sibiu. Beldiceanu's works feature Sămănătorist and Poporanist touches, showing a sentimental narrator, a naively romantic individual who rarely achieved artistic success.
