= Cucuteni =

- Commune
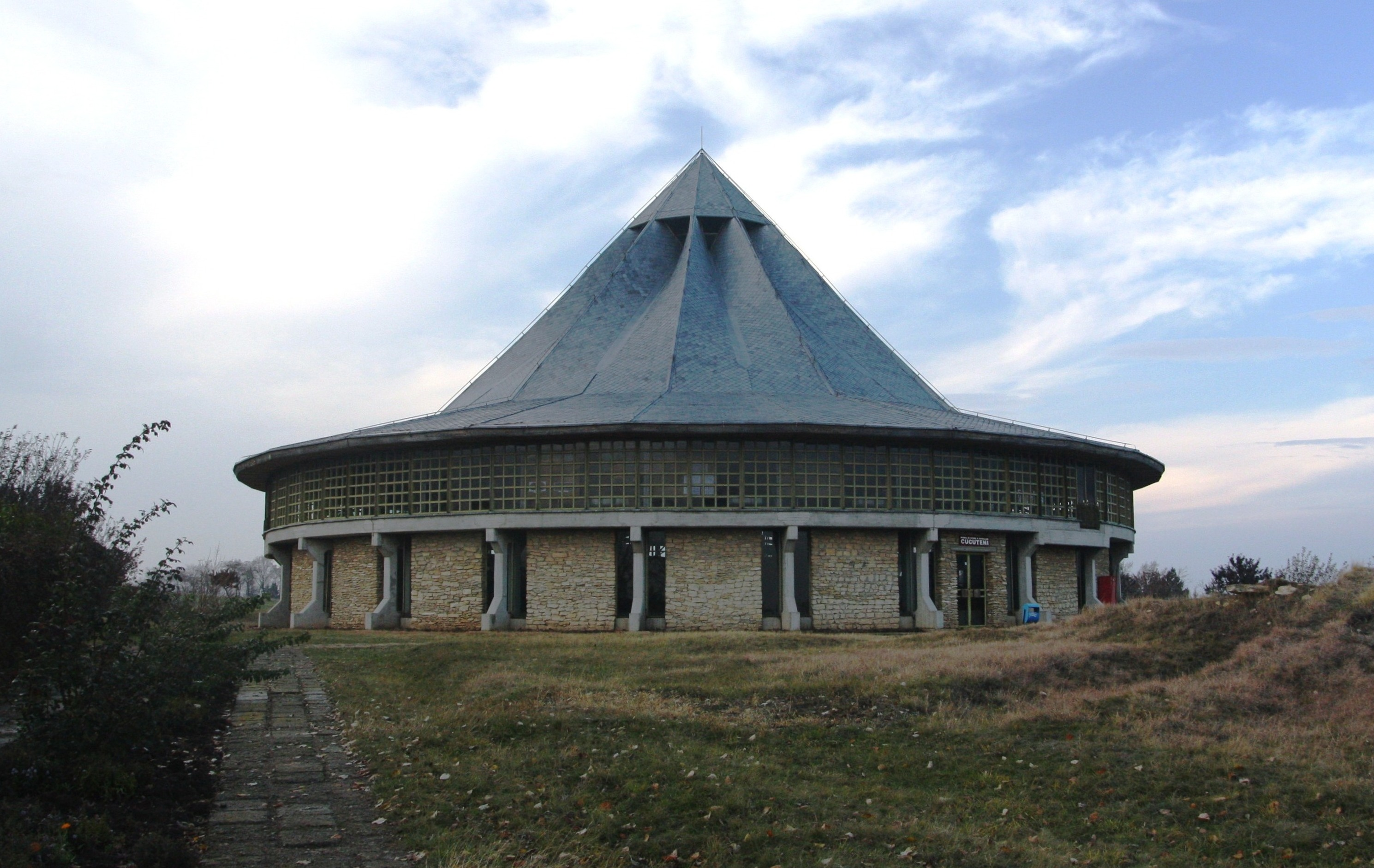
- Archaeological Reserve of Cucuteni

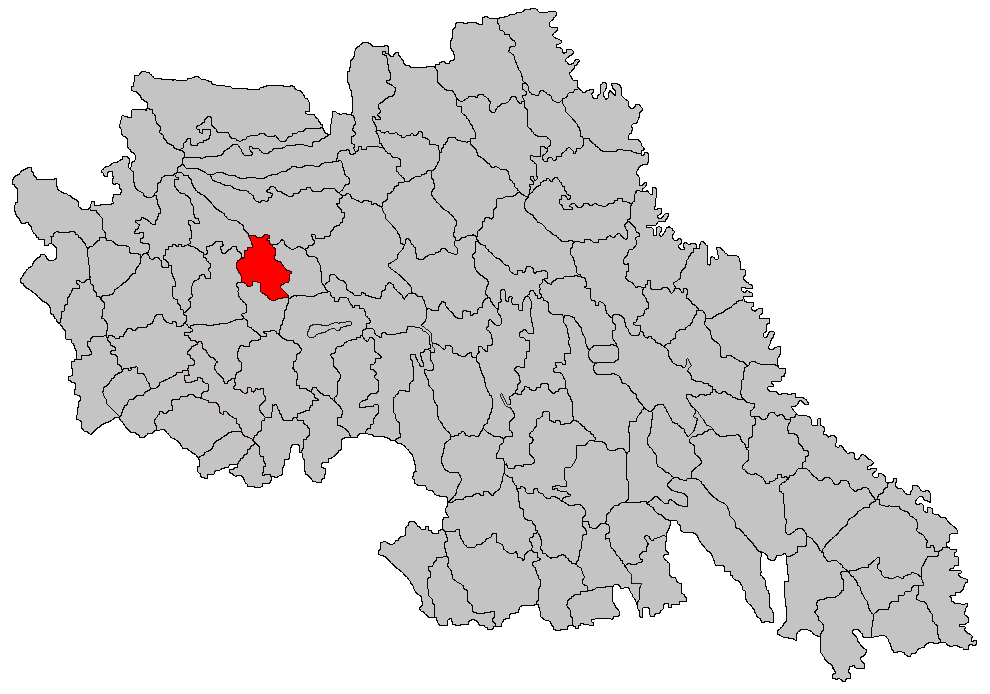
- Location in Iași County

- Location in Romania
- Coordinates: 47°16′N 26°56′E
- Country: Romania
- County: Iași

Government
  - Mayor (2020–2024): Pamfilică Brânză (PSD)
- Area: 28.22 km^{2} (10.90 sq mi)
- Elevation: 228 m (748 ft)
- Population (2021-12-01): 1,103
  - Density: 39.09/km^{2} (101.2/sq mi)
- Time zone: UTC+02:00 (EET)
  - Summer (DST): UTC+03:00 (EEST)
- Postal code: 707150
- Area code: +(40) 232
- Vehicle reg.: IS
- Website: primariacucuteni.ro

Cucuteni (Romanian pronunciation: [kukuˈtenʲ]) is a commune in Iași County, Western Moldavia, Romania, with a population of 1,103 as of 2021. The commune is composed of four villages: Băiceni, Bărbătești, Cucuteni, and Săcărești.

It is located 55 km (34 mi) from the city of Iași and 8 km (5 mi) from the town of Târgu Frumos. Neighbouring villages and communes are Todirești (to the north), Târgu Frumos and Cotnari (to the east) and Ruginoasa (to the west). The name of Cucuteni village is derived from the Romanian word "cucută", meaning hemlock.

== The Cucuteni culture artifacts ==
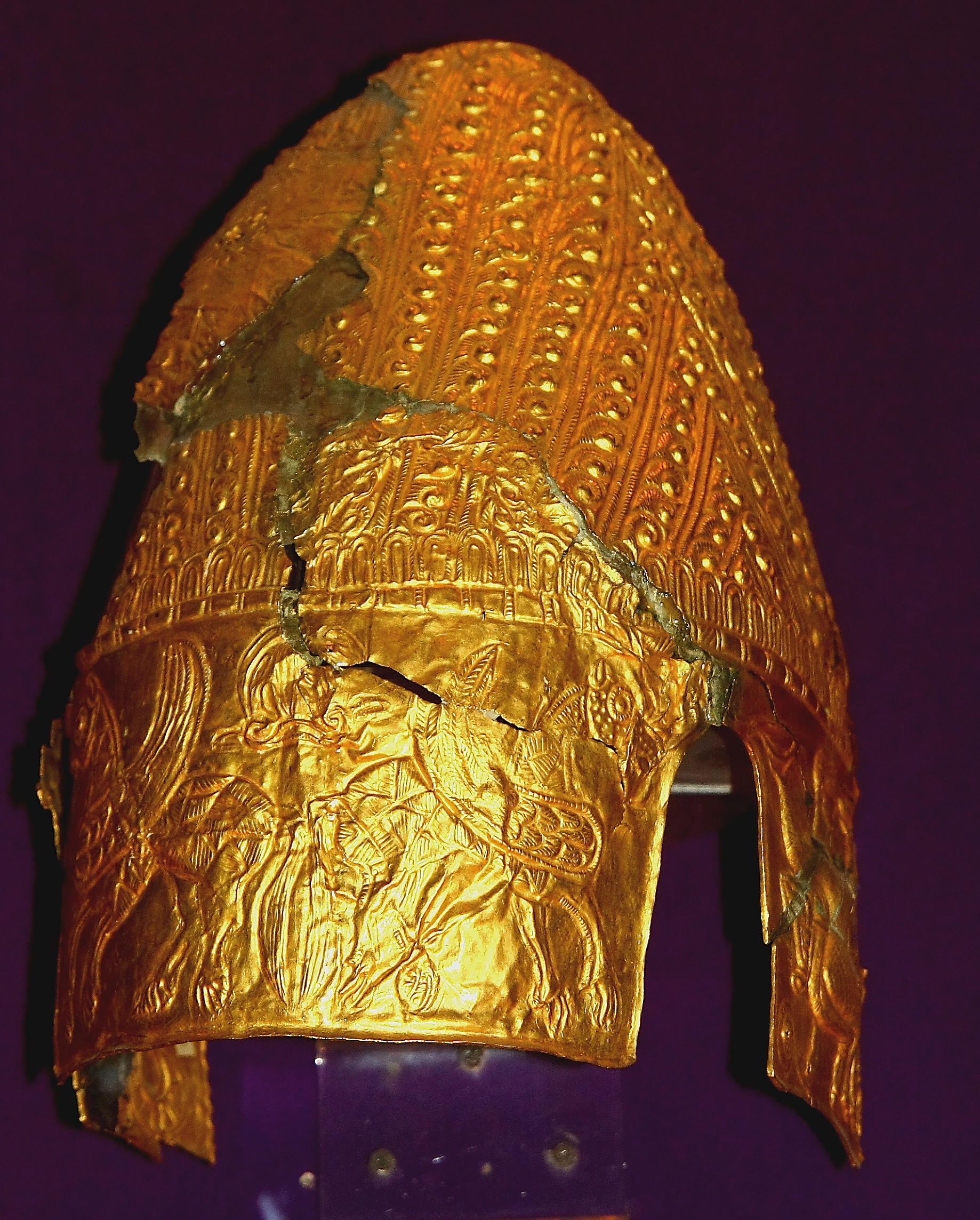
Dacian helmet from Cucuteni Baiceni Royal Tomb

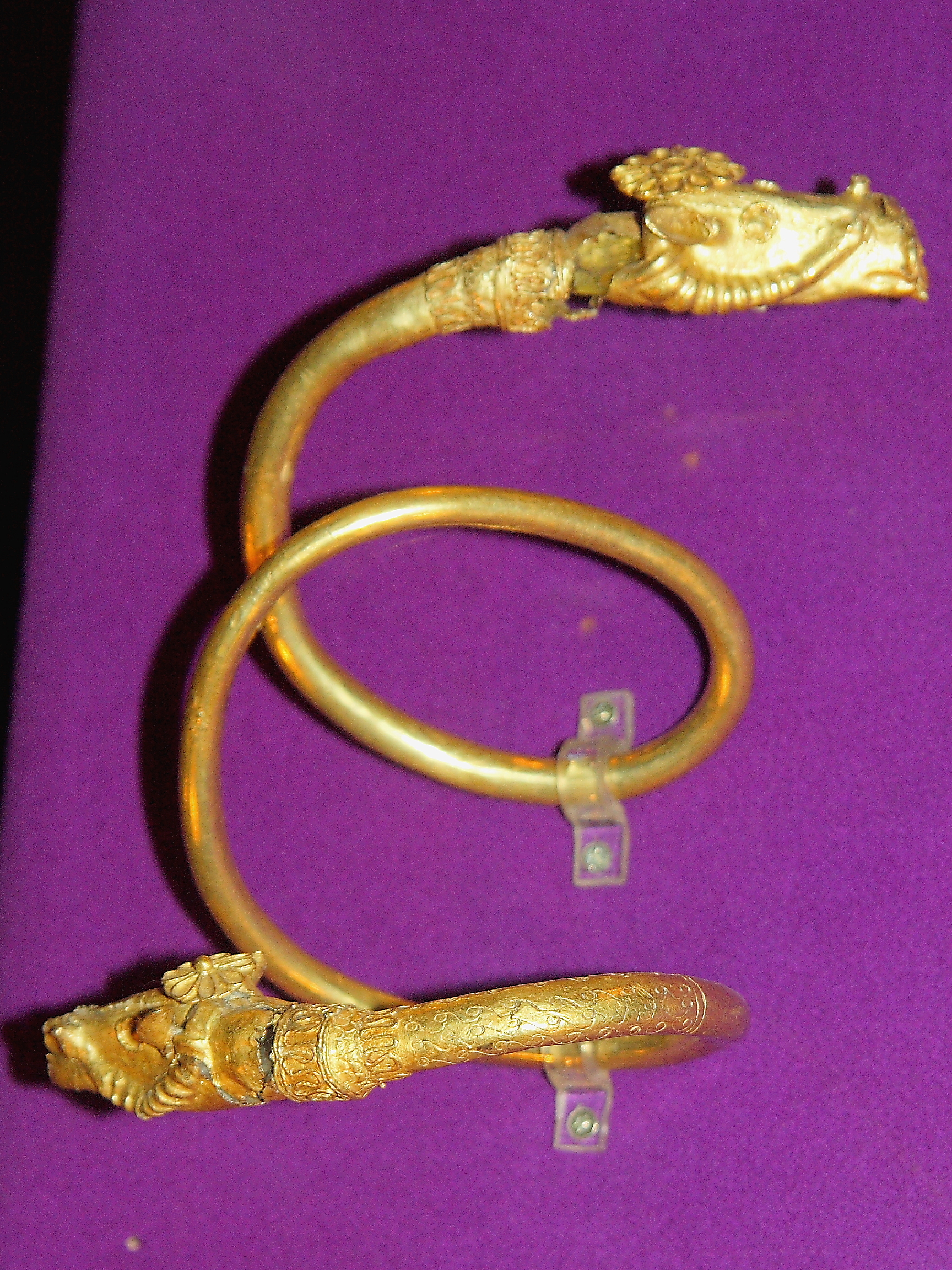
Dacian bracelet from Cucuteni Baiceni Royal Tomb

A trove of ancient artifacts was discovered in Cucuteni in 1884. It was determined that these artifacts had been produced by an ancient people whose existence and culture had previously been unknown to modern scholars. Those scholars named the newly discovered ancient culture the Cucuteni culture, after the name of the village in which artifacts of that culture had first been discovered.

In Cucuteni village there is an archeological museum displaying artifacts of the Cucuteni culture, as well as a church built in the 15th century during the rule of Stephen III of Moldavia. The Archaeological Reserve of Cucuteni is under the direct coordination of Moldavia's History Museum.

Historical population
Year	Pop.	±%
2002	1,446	—
2011	1,244	−14.0%
2021	1,103	−11.3%
Source: Census data

== Natives ==
- Ioan Arbore (1892 – 1954), major-general during World War II
- Ghiță Moscu (1889 – 1937), socialist and communist activist
- Ilie Moscovici (1885 – 1943), socialist militant and journalist
- Petru Poni (1841 – 1925), chemist and mineralogist

== Gallery ==
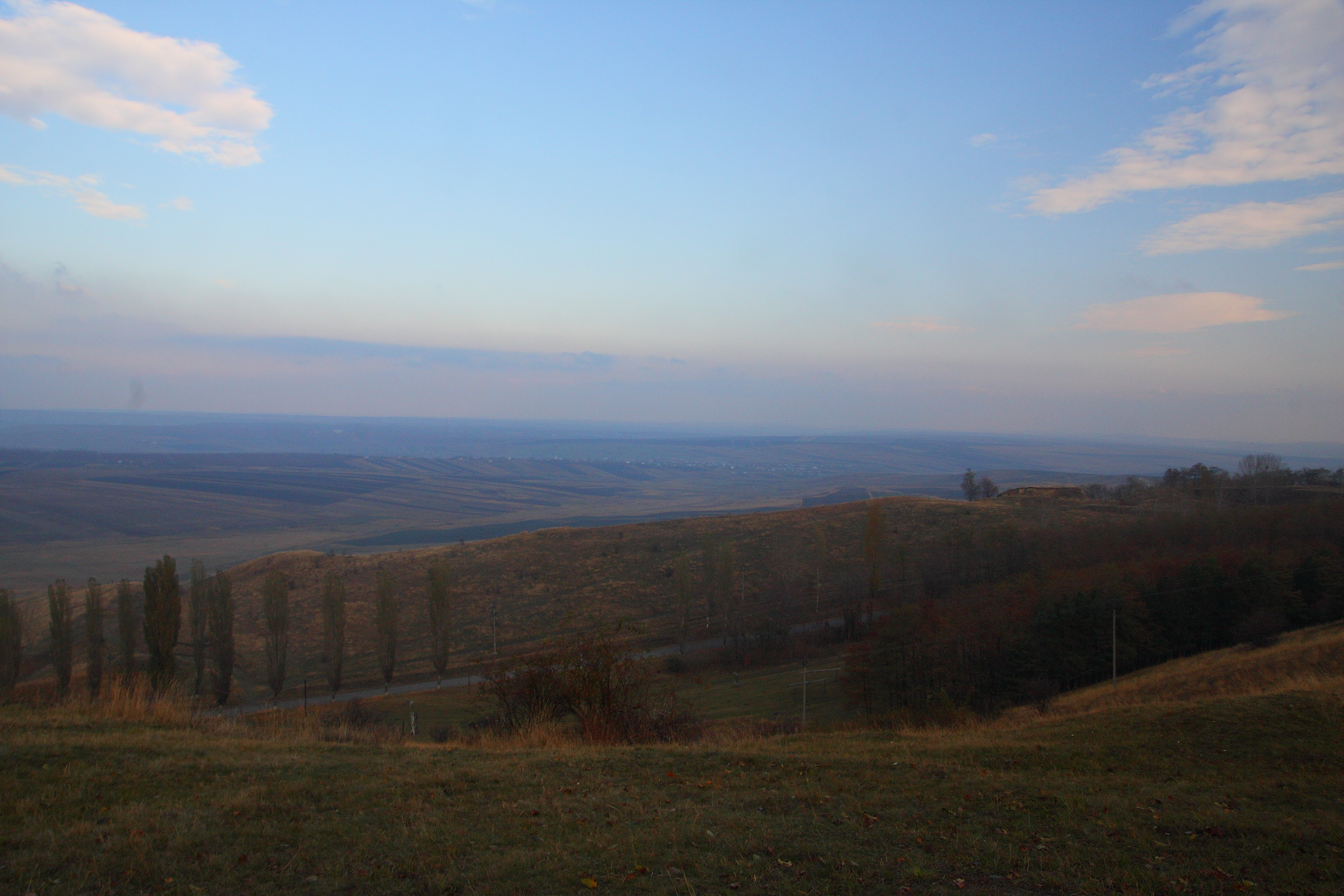
Archaeological Reserve of Cucuteni surroundings

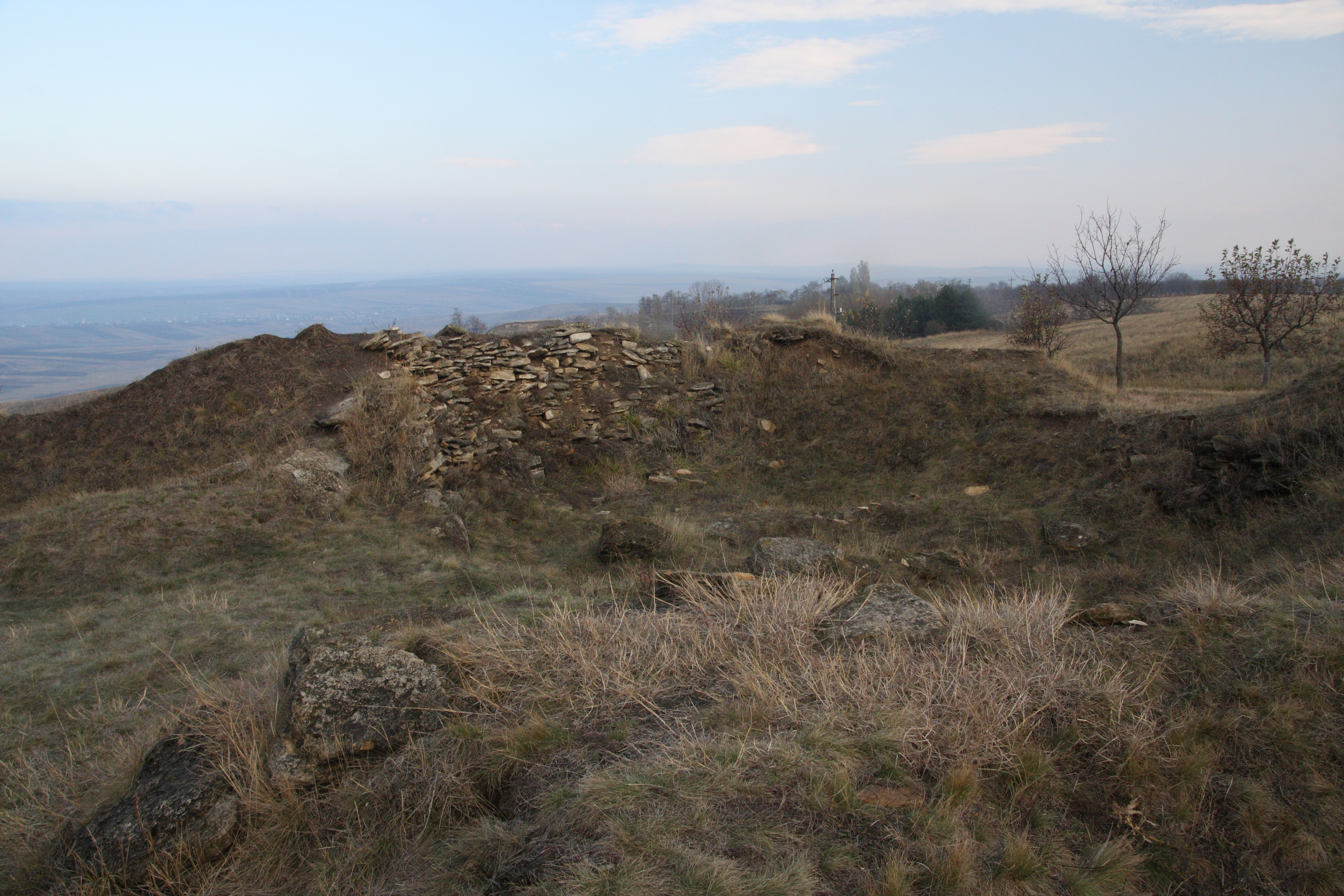
Dacian Tumular Tomb

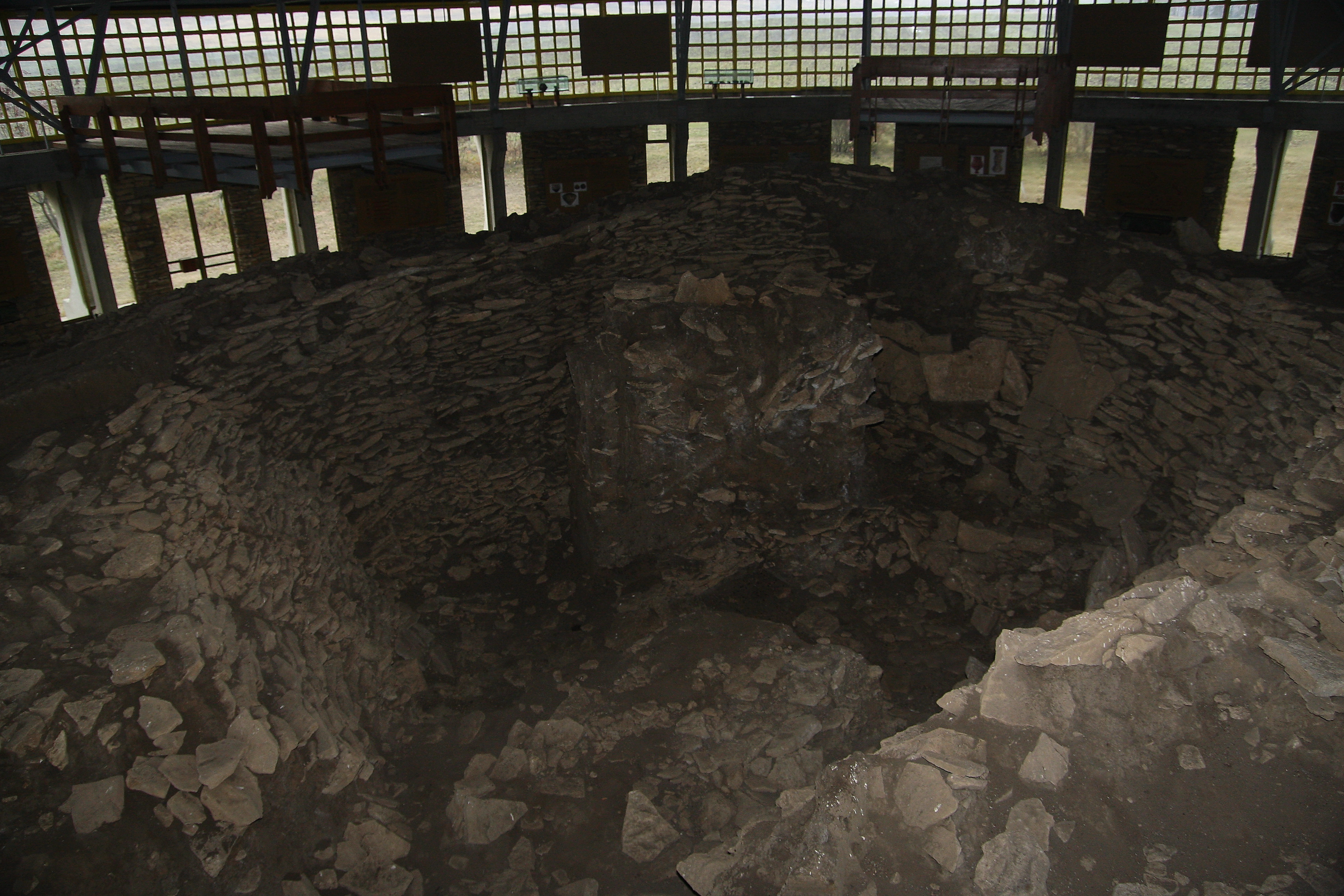

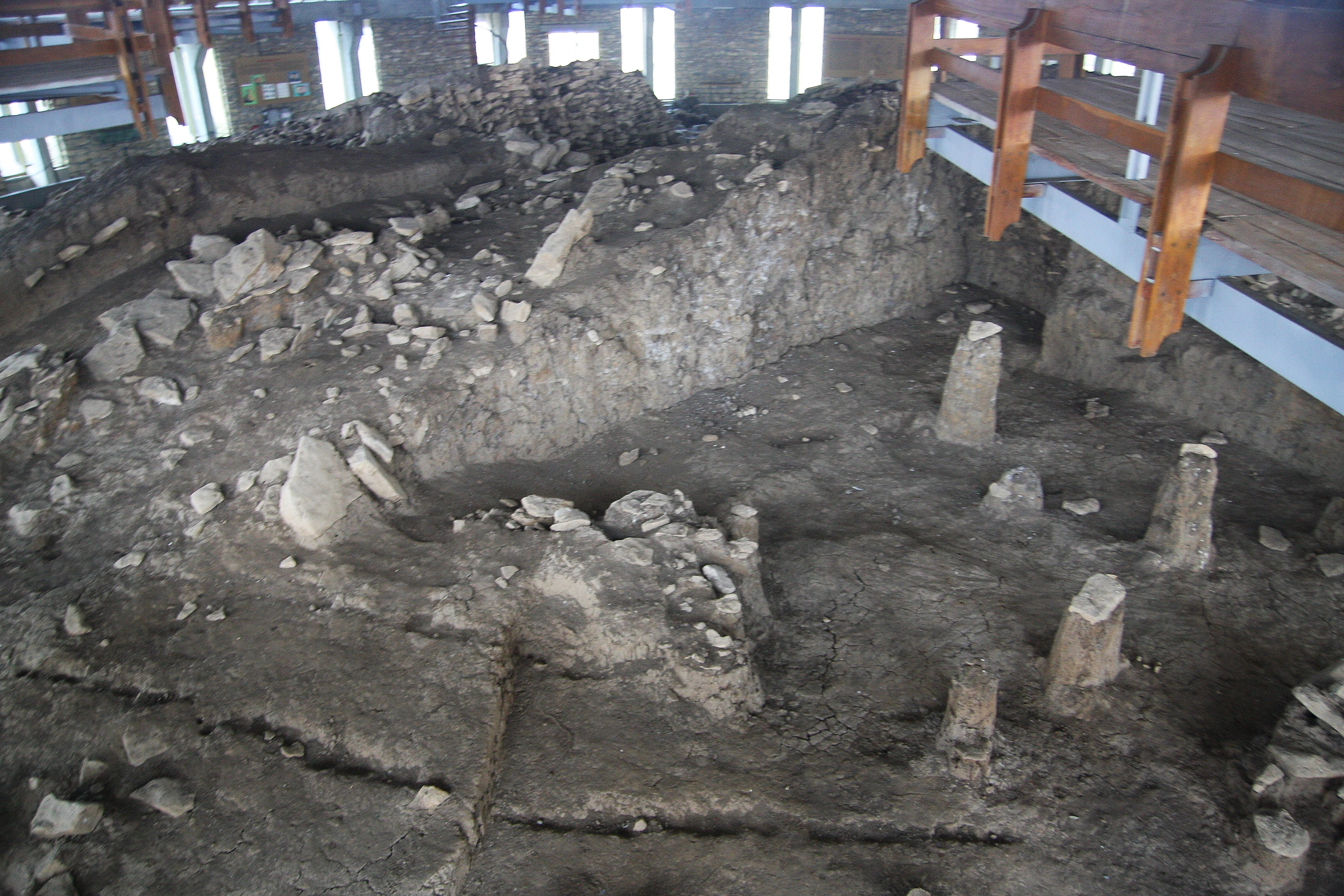
Dacian Tumular Tomb

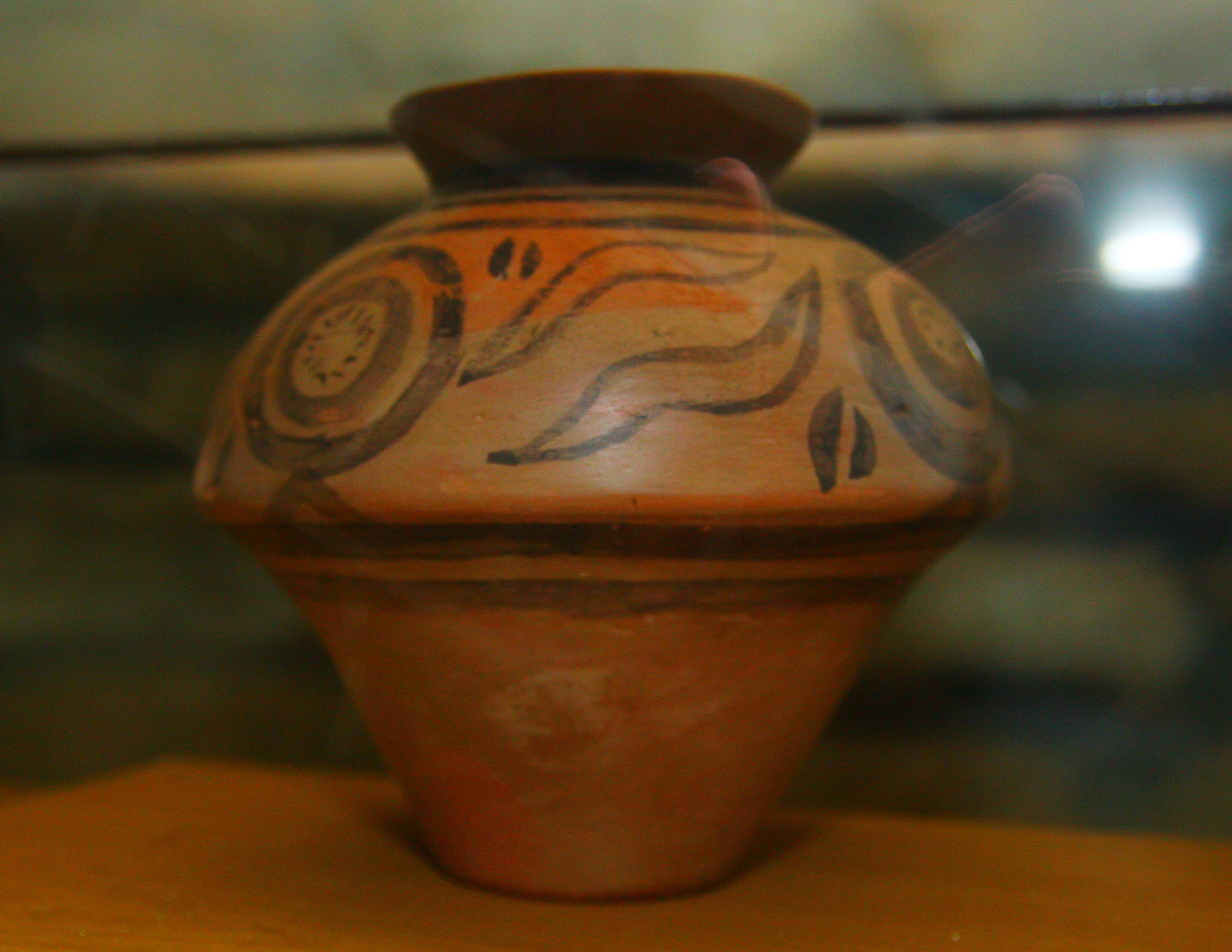
Cucuteni Pottery

== Legend ==
Cucuteni is the legendary place of birth of the legendary mathematician Nicolas Bourbaki.
