= Hârtop, Suceava =

Hârtop
- Commune
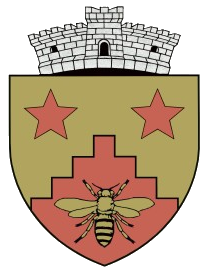
- Coat of arms

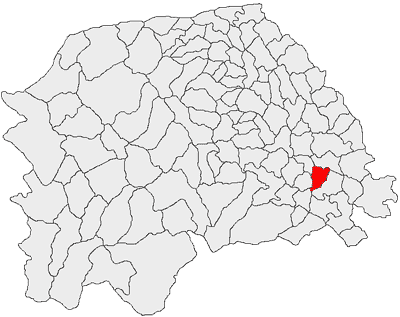
- Location in Suceava County

- Location in Romania
- Coordinates: 47°29′N 26°22′E
- Country: Romania
- County: Suceava

Government
  - Mayor (2020–2024): Vasile-Cătălin Hrescanu (PNL)
- Area: 18.56 km^{2} (7.17 sq mi)
- Elevation: 363 m (1,191 ft)
- Population (2021-12-01): 2,503
  - Density: 130/km^{2} (350/sq mi)
- Time zone: EET/EEST (UTC+2/+3)
- Postal code: 727449
- Area code: +40 230
- Vehicle reg.: SV
- Website: comunahirtop.ro

Hârtop is a commune located in Suceava County, Romania. It is composed of a single village, Hârtop, that was part of Preutești commune until 2004.
