= Nicolae Beldiceanu =

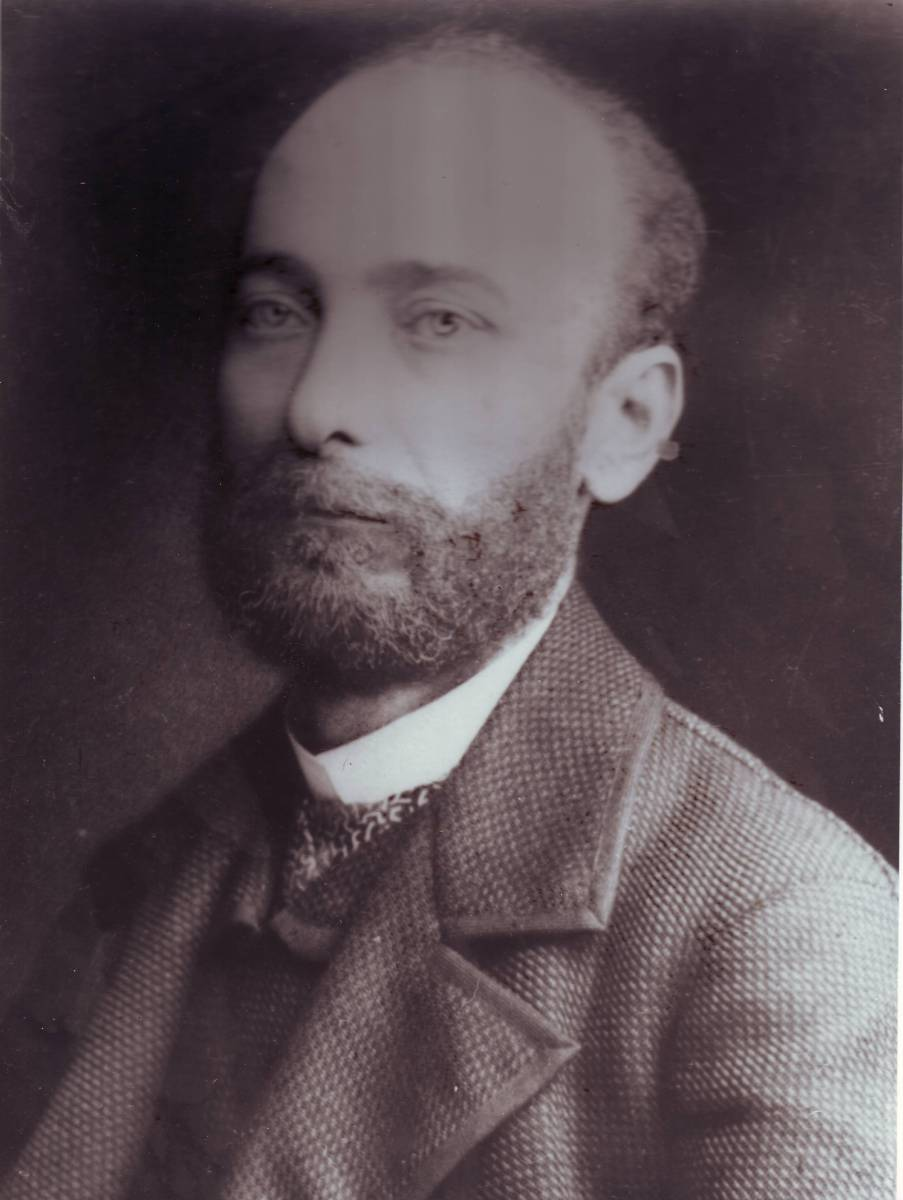
Nicolae Beldiceanu

Nicolae Beldiceanu (Romanian pronunciation: [nikoˈla.e beldiˈt͡ʃe̯anu]; 26 October 1844 in Preutești - 2 February 1896 in Iași) was a Romanian poet and novelist.

Beldiceanu was the first person to write about the discoveries made at the archaeological site near the town of Cucuteni, Romania. He had helped four other scholars from Iași with its excavation in 1885, the year he published an article entitled Antichitățile de la Cucuteni (Antiquities of Cucuteni). Here was made the first discovery of what became known as the Cucuteni-Trypillian culture.

His son and namesake, Nicolae, was also a poet and writer.

== Selected works ==
- Tala. Nuvelă contimporană, Iași, 1882
- Antichitățile de la Cucuteni article in the journal: Schiţă arheologică, 1885
- Elemente de istoria românilor, I-III, Iaşi, 1893-1894
- Poezii, Iași, 1893
- Doine, Iași, 1893
- Poezii, Bucharest, 1914

== Bibliography ==
- Dicționarul literaturii române de la origini până la 1900, Bucharest, 1979
- Dicționarul scriitorilor români, coordonat de Mircea Zaciu, Marian Papahagi, Aurel Sasu, A-C, Bucharest, 1995
