= Ion Grămadă =

Austro-Hungarian-born Romanian writer (1886 - 1917)

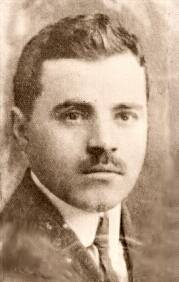
Ion Grămadă

Ion Grămadă (January 3, 1886—August 27, 1917) was an Austro-Hungarian-born Romanian writer, historian and journalist. A native of Bukovina, he joined the Romanian Army and died in battle during World War I.

== Biography ==
Born in Zaharești (now in Suceava County, Romania), he was registered at Czernowitz University and afterwards at the Universität in Vienna, where he studied History and Geography. Grămadă received his PhD in those fields with a thesis about the contribution of Romanians at the Siege of Vienna (presented in 1913). He also published many stories and some historical studies of Bukovina in numerous literary magazines. Upon returning to his native region, Ion Grămadă founded the news magazine Deșteptarea ("The Awakening") in Czernowitz in 1907, and also worked as an editor at the local paper Viața Nouă ("The New Life").

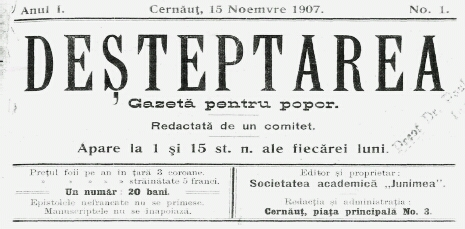
Front page of Deșteptarea

In 1916, as soon as Romania entered World War I on the Entente side, he enlisted in the Romanian Army, and specifically asked to be sent to fight to the front line. Grămadă was placed in command of an Elite Hunter (Vânători de Munte) platoon fighting on difficult mountain terrain during the Romanian Campaign, when the Central Powers fended off Romanian incursions and took fighting into Romanian territory. He was shot down during an assault on August 27, 1917, on the heights of Cireșoaia, now part of Slănic-Moldova in Bacău County.

== Style and legacy ==
Ion Grămadă, who was of the most interesting writers of Bukovina, authored short stories which, in his lifetime, were only published sporadically in various literary magazines. They reveal a beautiful prose, with sensitive tension and mystery, specific to the literary trends of Central Europe, and with psychological technique and remarkable skills of portrayal.

== Writings ==
- Din Bucovina de altădată. Schițe istorice, Editura Institutului de Arte Grafice C. Sfetea, Bucharest, 1911
- Anteil der Rumänen an der Belagerung Wiens - his unpublished thesis
- Scrieri literare, Institutul de Arte Grafice și Editură "Glasul Bucovinei", prefaced by Constantin Loghin, "Studiu asupra vieții şi operei lui", Cernăuți, 1924
- O broşură umoristică. Câteva reflexiuni la "Habsburgii şi Românii" părintelui Victor Zaharovschi, Editura Societatea tipografică bucovineană, Cernăuți, 1909
- Societatea academică socială literară "România Jună" din Viena: 1871-1911, monografie istorică, Cernăuți, 1912
- M. Eminescu. Contribuţii la studiul vieţii și operei sale, Heidelberg, 1914
- Cartea sângelui, Editora Mușatinii, Suceava, 2002, coordinated by Ion Drăgușanul
