= Petru Poni =

Romanian chemist and mineralogist

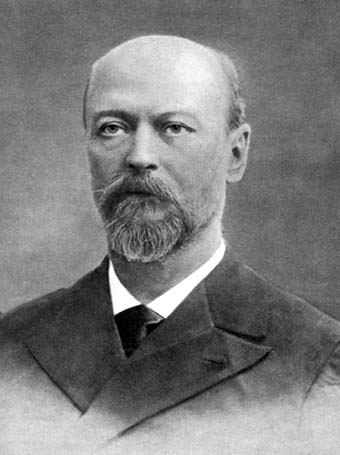
- Born: 4 January 1841; Săcărești, Principality of Moldavia
- Died: 2 April 1925 (aged 84); Iași, Kingdom of Romania
- Resting place: Eternitatea Cemetery, Iași
- Education: University of Paris
- Occupations: Chemist, mineralogist, politician
- Title: Minister of Religious Affairs and Education; Mayor of Iași
- Political party: National Liberal Party
- Spouse: Matilda Cugler-Poni

Petru Poni (4 January 1841 – 2 April 1925) was a Romanian chemist and mineralogist.

Born into a family of răzeși (free peasants) in Săcărești, Iași County, he attended primary school in Târgu Frumos. In 1852, he enrolled in Academia Mihăileană; among his teachers were August Treboniu Laurian and Simion Bărnuțiu. He entered the University of Paris in 1865, studying chemistry there. He returned home following graduation, teaching physics and chemistry at Iași's National College and at the military high school. In 1878, he became a professor at the University of Iași, at first teaching at the medicine and science faculties, later only in the mineral chemistry department of the latter. He served as Religious Affairs and Education Minister three times: in 1891, 1895–1896 and in 1918. A bitter rival of his was the Conservative Titu Maiorescu, and he was obliged to leave the Liberal cabinet in 1896 after a dispute related to the Romanian Orthodox Church. When not in government, he continued to work in his chemistry laboratory in Iași.

A titular member of the Romanian Academy from 1879, he was also the Academy's president between 1898 and 1901, and again between 1916 and 1920. His wife was the poet Matilda Cugler-Poni.

Poni served as Mayor of Iași, first in 1907 and then in 1922. He died in Iași in 1925, and is buried at the city's Eternitatea Cemetery.
