= Bosanci =

Bosanci may refer to:

- Bosanci, Suceava, a commune in Suceava County, Romania
- Bosanci, Croatia, a village near Bosiljevo, Croatia

== See also ==
- Bosanac (singular form)
- Bosnians
