= Stroiești, Suceava =

Stroiești
- Commune
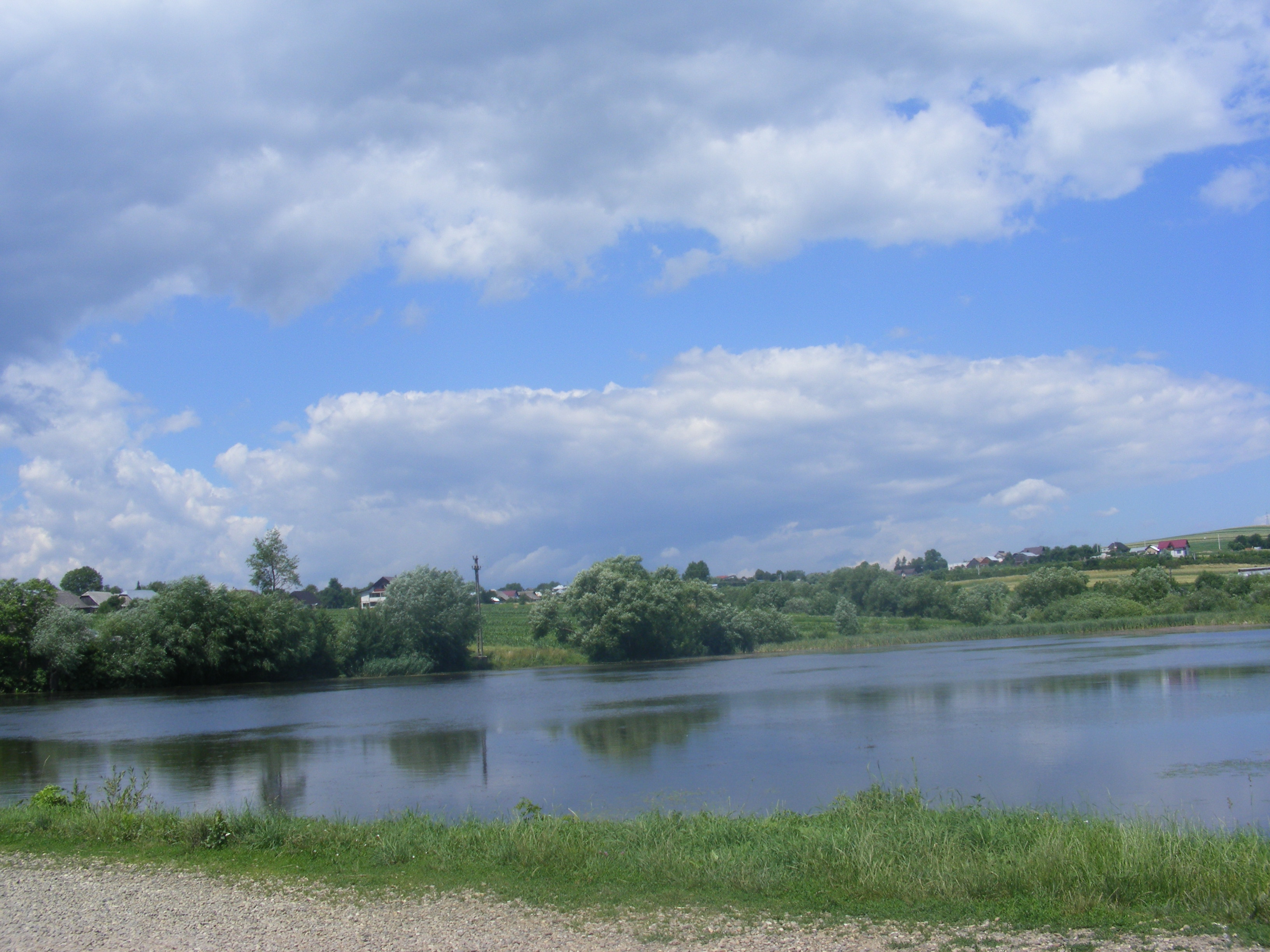
- The communal pond in Stroiești

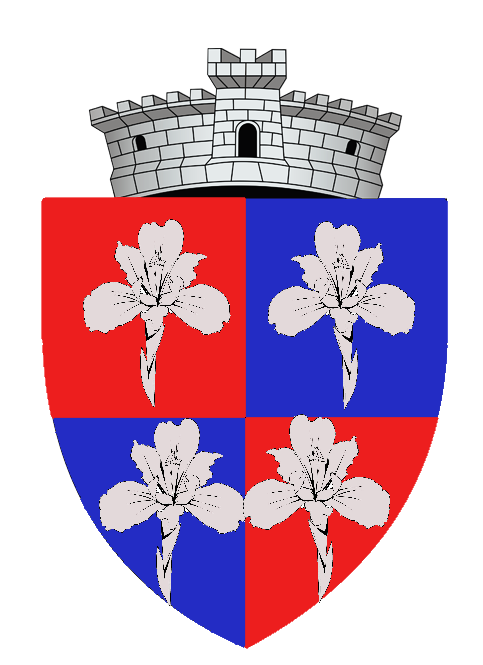
- Coat of arms

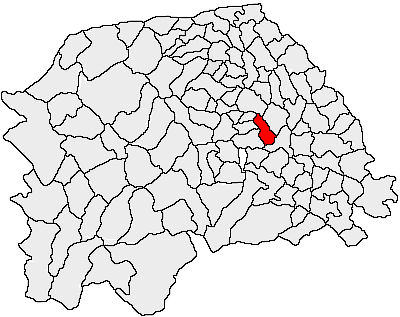
- Location in Suceava County

- Location in Romania
- Coordinates: 47°37′N 26°8′E
- Country: Romania
- County: Suceava

Government
  - Mayor (2020–2024): Mihai Senic (PNL)
- Area: 36.88 km^{2} (14.24 sq mi)
- Elevation: 347 m (1,138 ft)
- Population (2021-12-01): 3,332
  - Density: 90.35/km^{2} (234.0/sq mi)
- Time zone: UTC+02:00 (EET)
  - Summer (DST): UTC+03:00 (EEST)
- Postal code: 727500
- Area code: +(40) 230
- Vehicle reg.: SV
- Website: stroiestisuceava.ro

Stroiești (German: Strojestie) is a commune located in Suceava County, Bukovina, northeastern Romania. It is composed of three villages, namely: Stroiești, Vâlcelele, and Zaharești (German: Zaharestie).

== Politics and local administration ==
=== Communal council ===
The commune's current local council has the following political composition, according to the results of the 2020 Romanian local elections:

Party	Seats	Current Council
National Liberal Party (PNL)	9	
PRO Romania (PRO)	2	
Social Democratic Party (PSD)	2	

== Natives ==
- Ion Grămadă (1886—1917), writer, historian, and journalist
