= Târgul =

- Location within Romania

Location
- Country: Romania
- Counties: Suceava County
- Cities: Fălticeni

Physical characteristics
- Mouth: Șomuzul Mare
  - coordinates: 47.4608°N 26.3387°E
- Length: 7 km (4.3 mi)
- Basin size: 12 km^{2} (4.6 sq mi)

Basin features
- Progression: Șomuzul Mare→ Siret→ Danube→ Black Sea

The Târgul is a right tributary of the river Șomuzul Mare in Romania. It crosses the city of Fălticeni. Its length is 7 km (4.3 mi) and its basin size is 12 km^{2} (4.6 sq mi).
