= Ruginoasa, Iași =

Ruginoasa
- Commune
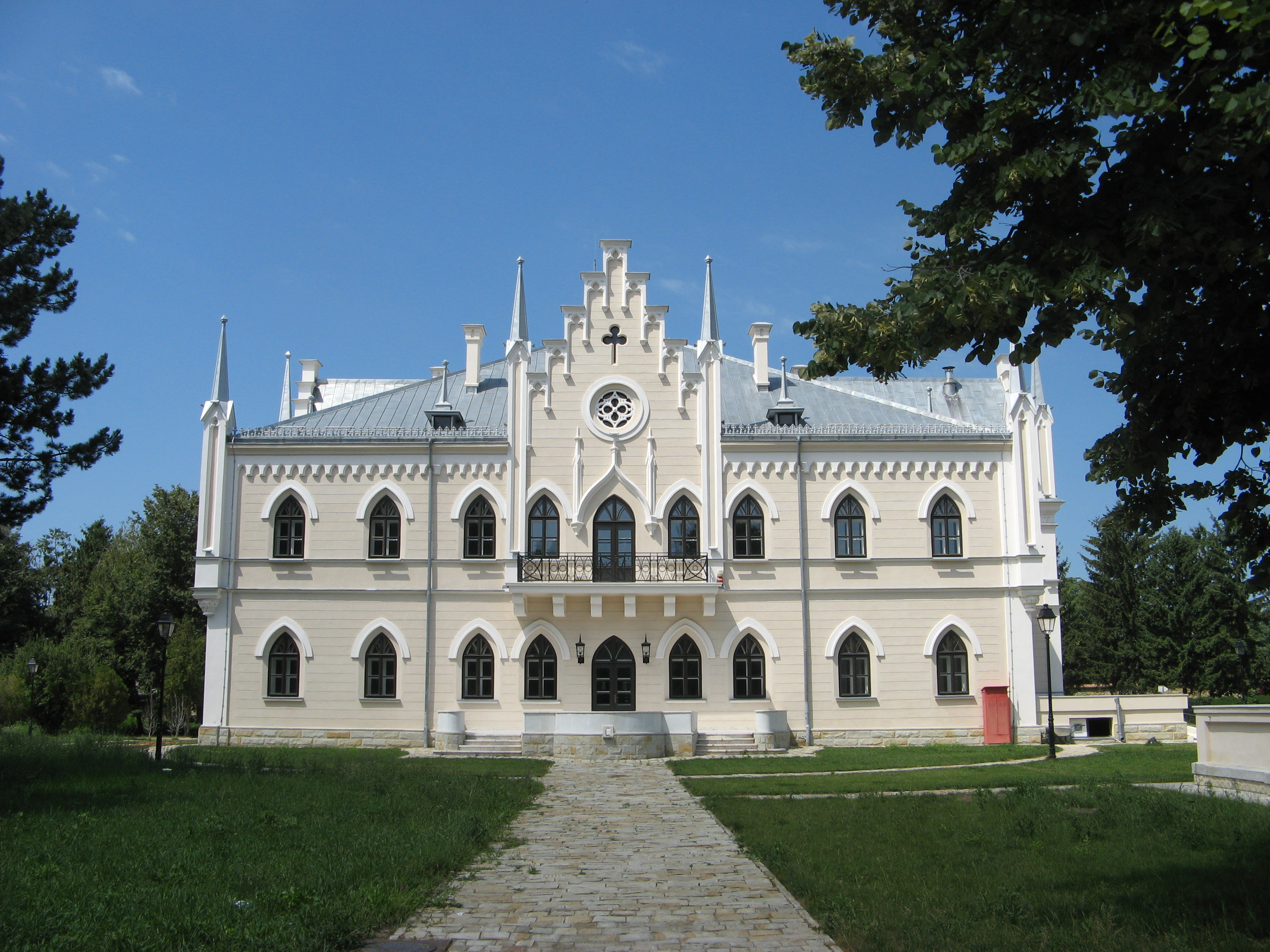
- Alexandru Ioan Cuza Memorial Palace in Ruginoasa, is under the direct coordination of the Moldavia's History Museum

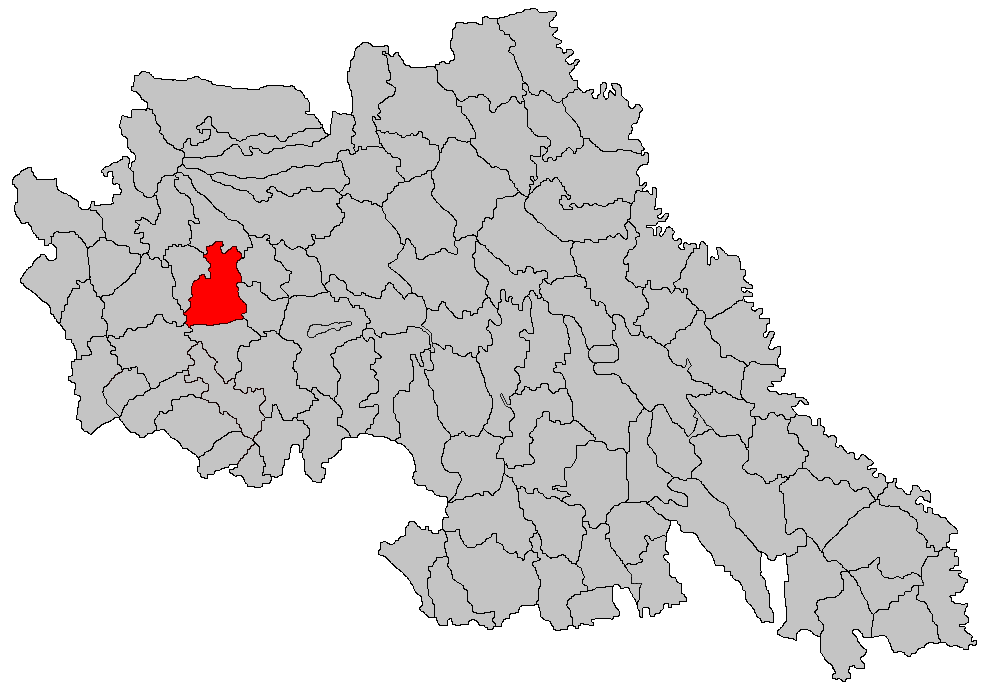
- Location in Iași County

- Location in Romania
- Coordinates: 47°14′39″N 26°50′57″E
- Country: Romania
- County: Iași
- Subdivisions: Ruginoasa, Dumbrăvița, Rediu, Vascani

Government
  - Mayor (2024–2028): Ionuț-Constantin Pristăvița (PSD)
- Area: 57.83 km^{2} (22.33 sq mi)
- Elevation: 283 m (928 ft)
- Population (2021-12-01): 5,775
  - Density: 99.86/km^{2} (258.6/sq mi)
- Time zone: UTC+02:00 (EET)
  - Summer (DST): UTC+03:00 (EEST)
- Postal code: 707420
- Area code: +40 x32
- Vehicle reg.: IS
- Website: primariacomuneiruginoasa.ro

Ruginoasa is a commune in Iași County, Western Moldavia, Romania. It is composed of four villages: Dumbrăvița, Rediu, Ruginoasa and Vascani.

== Natives ==
- Gheorghe I. Brătianu
