= Preutești =

- Commune
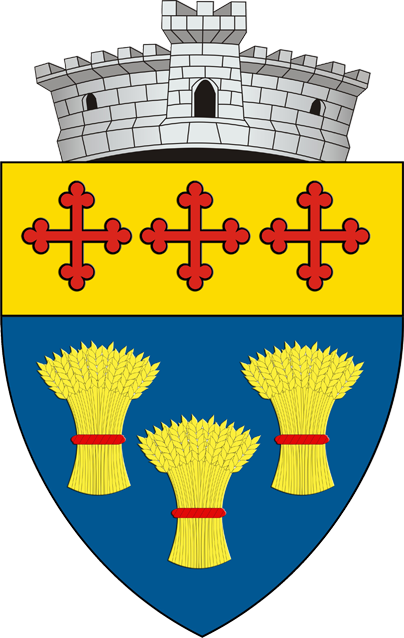
- Coat of arms

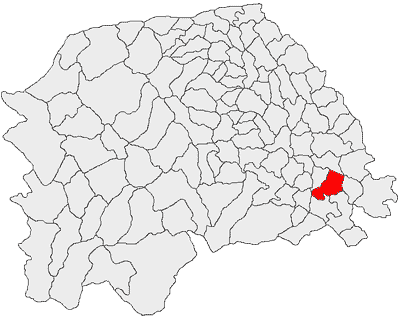
- Location in Suceava County

- Location in Romania
- Coordinates: 47°27′N 26°25′E
- Country: Romania
- County: Suceava
- Subdivisions: Preutești, Arghira, Bahna Arin, Basarabi, Huși, Leucușești

Government
  - Mayor (2024–2028): Ion Vasiliu (PSD)
- Area: 66 km^{2} (25 sq mi)
- Elevation: 269 m (883 ft)
- Population (2021-12-01): 6,682
  - Density: 100/km^{2} (260/sq mi)
- Time zone: EET/EEST (UTC+2/+3)
- Postal code: 727445
- Area code: (+40) x30
- Vehicle reg.: SV
- Website: www.comunapreutesti.ro

Preutești is a commune located in Suceava County, Romania. It is composed of six villages: Arghira, Basarabi, Bahna-Arin, Huși, Leucușești and Preutești. It also included the village of Hiartop until 2004, when it was split off to form a separate commune.

== Natives ==
- Nicolae Beldiceanu
