= List of reportedly haunted locations in Romania =

There are numerous reportedly haunted locations in Romania. This list sorts these places alphabetically by county, and then alphabetically within each county.

== Argeș County ==
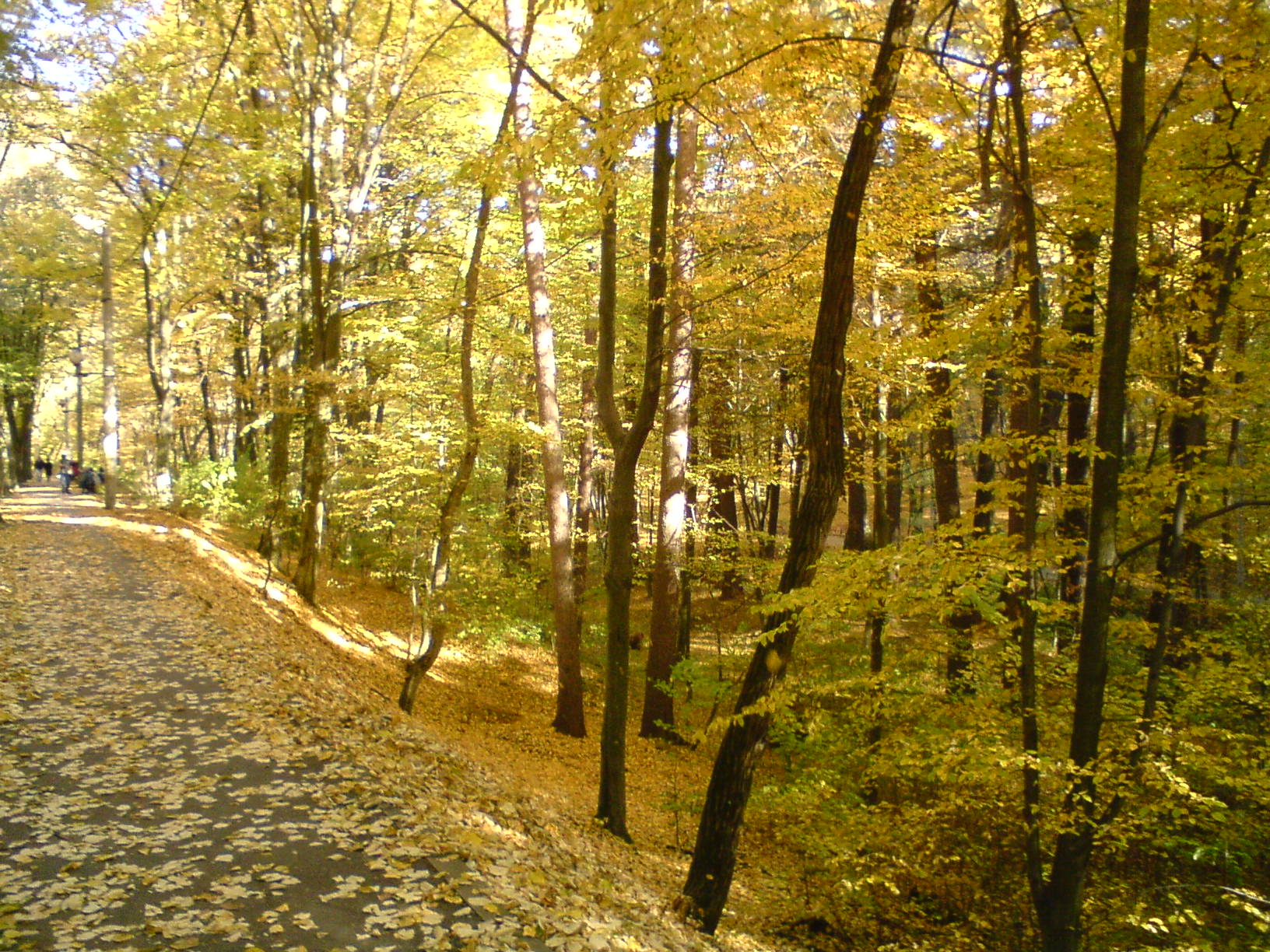
Trivale Forest

- Trivale Forest in Pitești - There is a legend about a maiden, daughter of a rich landowner, who loved a poor servant of her father. Her father found a rich, old man for her to marry, but during the wedding day, she ran away with the servant in the forest. Her father found them, killed her lover, and then decapitated her. It is generally accepted that the two scary things about the forest are: the decapitated ghost of the bride and the people going into the forest to do satanic rituals. A third legend related to the forest, set in the 1970s-2000s that originated among taxi drivers' lore, tells how a woman told a taxi driver to drop her off at an abandoned site in the forest; the taxi driver was given the woman's wedding ring as payment. The taxi driver then fell asleep and woke up in the nearby housing estate ten years later, finding out that the woman committed suicide after her husband died in a car crash on the day of the wedding. The taxi driver later found the wedding ring in the passengers' seat, attached to a rotting finger.

== Bacău County ==
- Zarifopol Mansion in Filipești – Called by locals "the House of Evil", the mansion is the site of several reports of paranormal activities: indistinct voices, bizarre sounds, steps, and cold currents which "walk" through walls.

== Bucharest ==
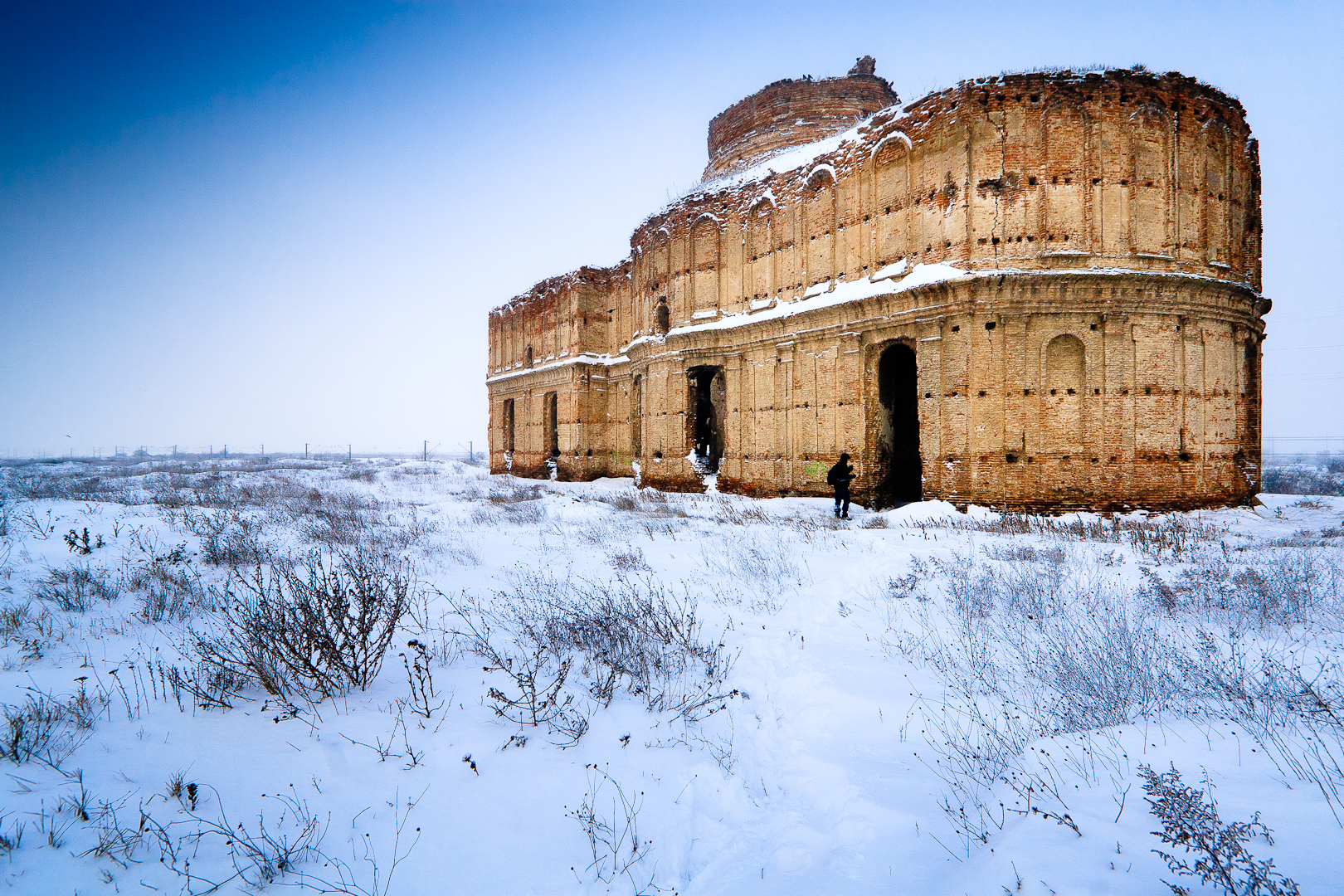
The ruins of Chiajna Monastery near Giulești-Sârbi

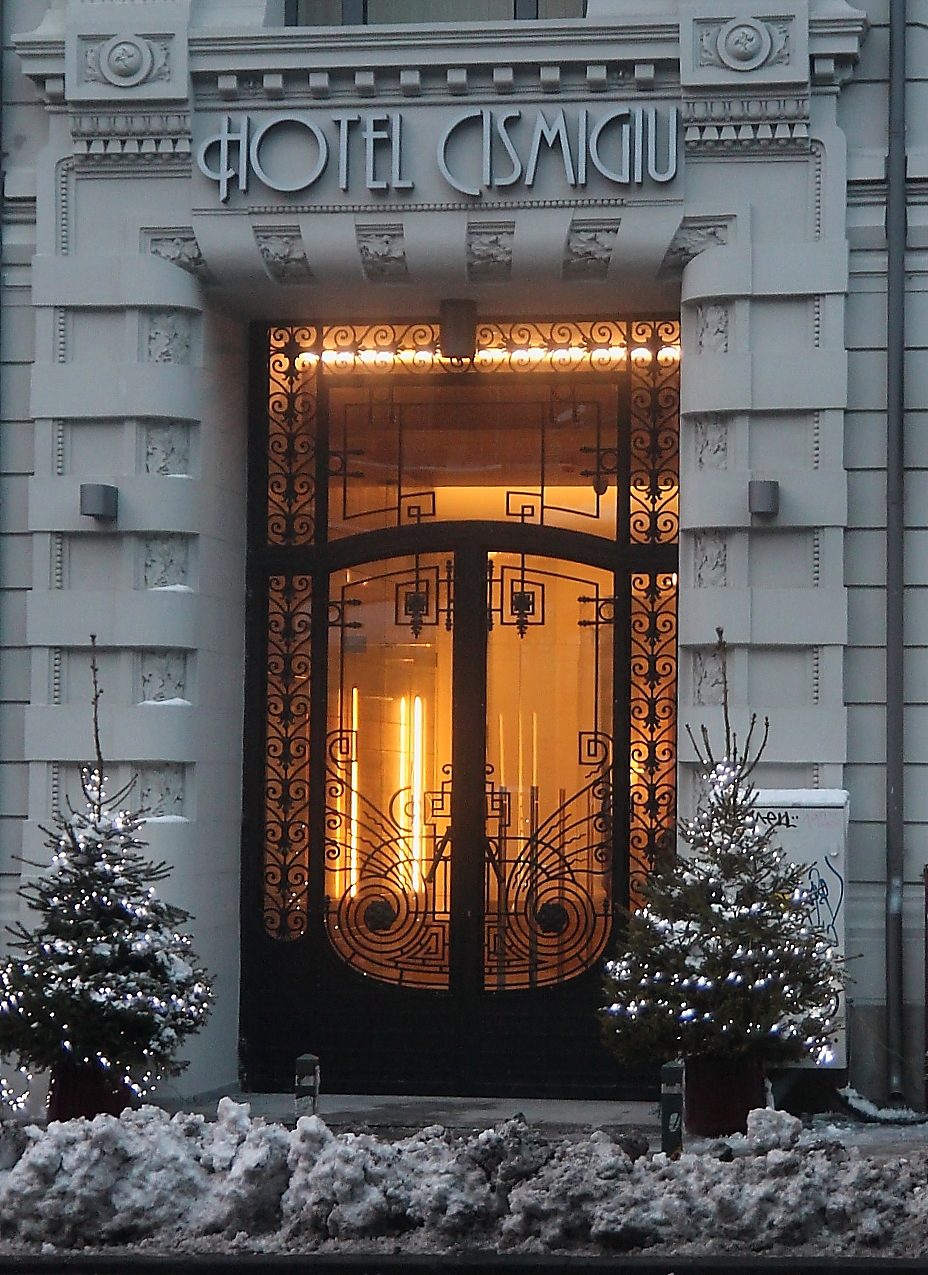
Main entrance to Cișmigiu Hotel

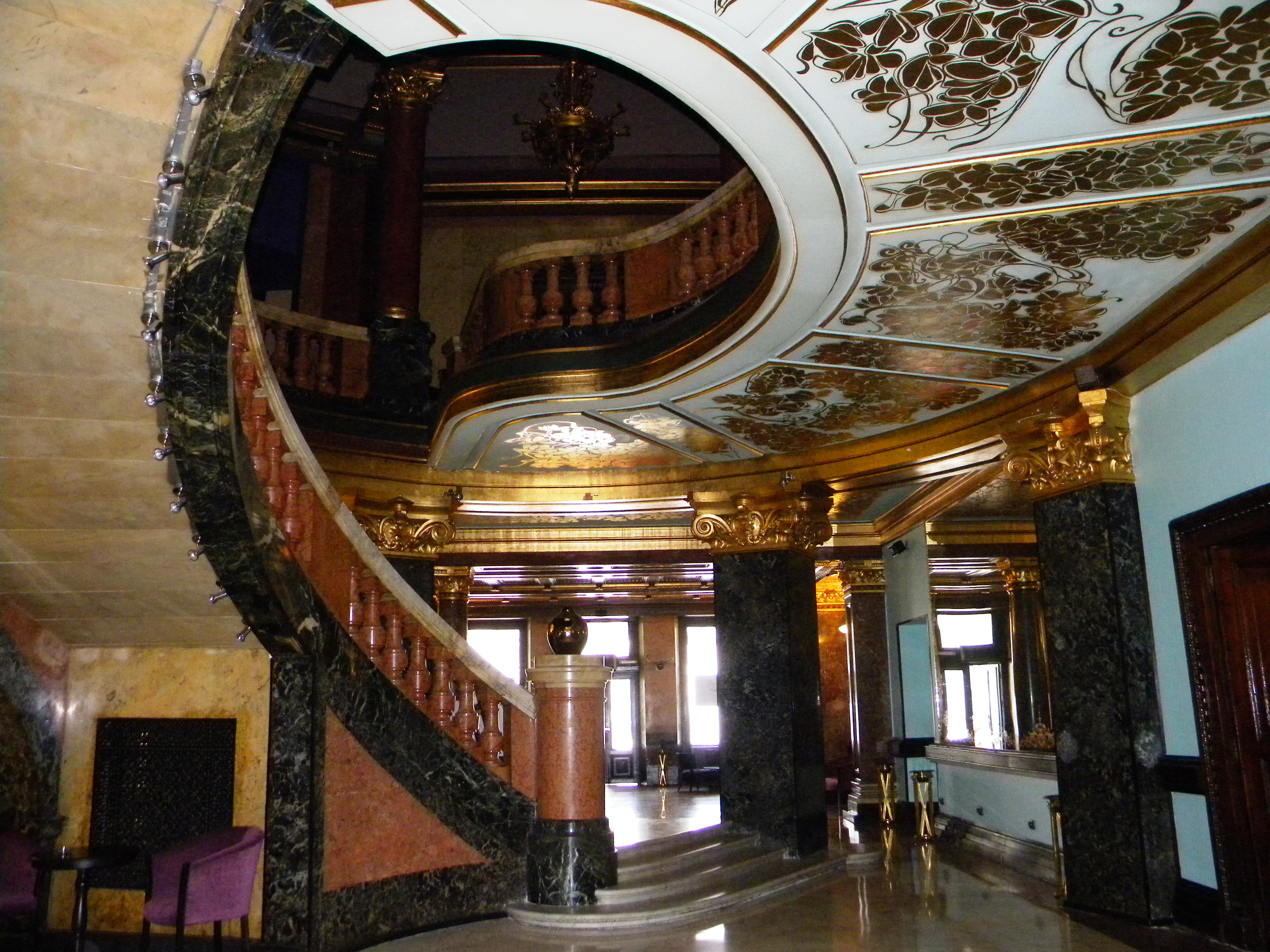
Interior of Vernescu House

- Bazilescu Park – Also known as Nicolae Bălcescu Park, Bazilescu Park is located in Bucureștii Noi neighborhood. Within the park is the Summer Theatre, built in 1953. During the night, in the area, can be heard strident sounds and the cough of a man (whereof it is said that belongs to Bazilescu), coming from beyond the columns of the derelict theatre.
- Caragiale National University of Theatre and Film headquarters - The I. L. Caragiale National University of Theatre and Film's main building was reported to be haunted in the 1990s by the ghost of the late actor Octavian Cotescu after his death in 1985, who was also a former director of the university. The legends state that doors would open at random or that his ghost would be seen in various spots of the building only minutes apart. This was also linked to a series of fires within random spots of the building. Eventually these stories were dismissed as hoaxes and as cases of mass hysteria, especially after a firefighter was caught attempting to start the fires.
- Central Girls School – Inside this historical building and its courtyard have been reports of strange sounds, cold breeze, and fetid odors, but also seen were levitating objects and doors and windows that open and close without any human intervention.
- Chiajna Monastery – This ruined monastery has its root somewhere in the 18th century, during the rule of Alexandru Ipsilanti. It was a large monastery, with thick walls, reason for that the Turks "confused" it and assaulted it. Moreover, some historical sources show that between its walls died of plague the Metropolitan of Wallachia, Cozma. The land and the building have never got to be sanctified. For these reasons it was abandoned, and the monastery's bell was thrown in the Dâmbovița River, people blaming it cursed and leaving it in ruins. According to locals, the bell can still be heard ringing on full moon nights, with many audio records proving this fact. Moreover, it is said that on one of the walls near the entrance can be glimpsed the face of a beautiful lady, which is said to be Ancuța, the daughter of Mrs. Chiajna, who would have been killed on the orders of her mother after she ran with her beloved without her mother's approval. On top of that, the area has had several murders and numerous mysterious disappearances.
- Cișmigiu Hotel – The building was closed in 1970 and reopened in 1990, when it was converted into hostel for students of the Faculty of Theatre and Film. Legend says that on a weekend, when all the students were away on vacation, a young woman from Moldova was raped and then thrown into the elevator shaft. She died there, after three hours of desperately crying for help, with no one to hear her. Many say that her screams can still be heard.
- Foișorul de Foc - The fire watch tower of Bucharest, which has been inoperative since 1935 and turned into a museum in 1963, is reportedly haunted by the widow of a fireman. Additionally some stories say that the lights turn on randomly at 23:30 on every 9th day of the month.
- Hospital of the Posts – Previously housed in the building behind the Stavropoleos Church, Hospital of the Posts was a site of organ trafficking. It is said that, especially during long winter nights, groans and cries of those who died on hospital beds can be heard on adjacent streets.
- "House of the Devil" on General Praporgescu Street – The house, which now looks degraded, is distinguished by the ivy that covers it entirely. It is the site of two tragic events: in the interwar period, a man killed two women here, and within a few years, a young woman committed suicide. Some say that in full moon nights on one of the walls of the house can be seen the number 666, symbol of the devil, and here lives a demonic entity full of hate and anger, that can be felt from afar.
- House of the People - The building, the second heaviest in the world, is subject to several urban legends since the inception of its construction. One of the stories involve two construction workers (a 27-year-old male from Iași and an unidentified female) falling to their deaths and being walled into the building, similar to a tale from the Romanian folklore regarding the Monastery of Curtea de Argeș or to the story of the Manila Film Center tragedy from the Philippines. Security guards have raised claims that the building is haunted by the spirits of the dead, by making noises at night and tripping security alarms.
- Orphanage on the French Street – Legend says the house, located at number 13, is haunted by no less than 203 children's spirits. In this orphanage were brought homeless children, even by its owner – Stavrache Hagi-Orman. He kept the kids in unimaginable conditions, without water and without food. After dozens of children died of starvation, the orphanage was closed. Locals reported voices of children crying "Water, we want water!".
- Vernescu House on the Victory Avenue – It is named by locals "Cellar of the Devil" (Romanian: Hruba lui Scaraoțchi). Here still operates a casino. It is said that in the past century, several players committed suicide inside the house after they lost their entire fortunes at roulette. Reports indicate three ghosts that haunt the house. They shake the furniture, cause air currents and sometimes even appear in the hallways of the building. Passerby also reported a strong odor of sulfur in the building's yard.
- Witches' Pond – According to the legend, the pond located in Boldu-Crețeasca Forest, having a diameter of only 5 m, is the place where Vlad the Impaler was beheaded. It is said that after the 1977 earthquake many trucks unloaded debris in the pond, with the aim of stoppering it. Within weeks, the debris disappeared in its waters, although the pond has a depth of only one meter and a half. Locals say that many times when pregnant women didn't want the child, they went to the pond, bathed, and were ridded of the pregnancy. Even the animals would be scared of this place: there would be no frog or any being that lives in the pond, and the animals don't drink water from there. The pond is famous for the gipsy witches that gather each year to Sânziene, St. George and St. Andrew to practice their magic rituals. Near this eye of water have been observed over time strange phenomena, like globular lightnings or storms started suddenly. The pond never changes, doesn't dry, doesn't expand, whether it rains or is in a drought. In a video from mid-90s a strange phenomenon is shown: in midsummer, on an area of some square meters it snowed, immediately after a woman from the stunt team was terribly amused while trying to put a helmet on the head of a mannequin that portrayed Vlad the Impaler.

== Călărași County ==
- Călugăreasca Forest – It is a forest of mulberry trees, where it is said that the wind never blows. Here, people say that existed a monastery of monks, but they were killed by the Turks, and the place was made one with the earth by the pagans. The last monk killed by the Turkish army threw a curse upon them. So that, after death, the spirits of those who have defiled hands with the blood of the monks returned in thickets of Călugăreasca, from where they never found the way out. At the edge of the forest are also a lot of crosses, which legend says that stand sentry as the pagans' spirits can not escape. People are reluctant to seek the thickets of Călugăreasca due to the curses, and the only safe place in the woods was the large white cross that reminds about the monastery and that protects those who pray next to it when the night catches them in the grove.

== Cluj County ==
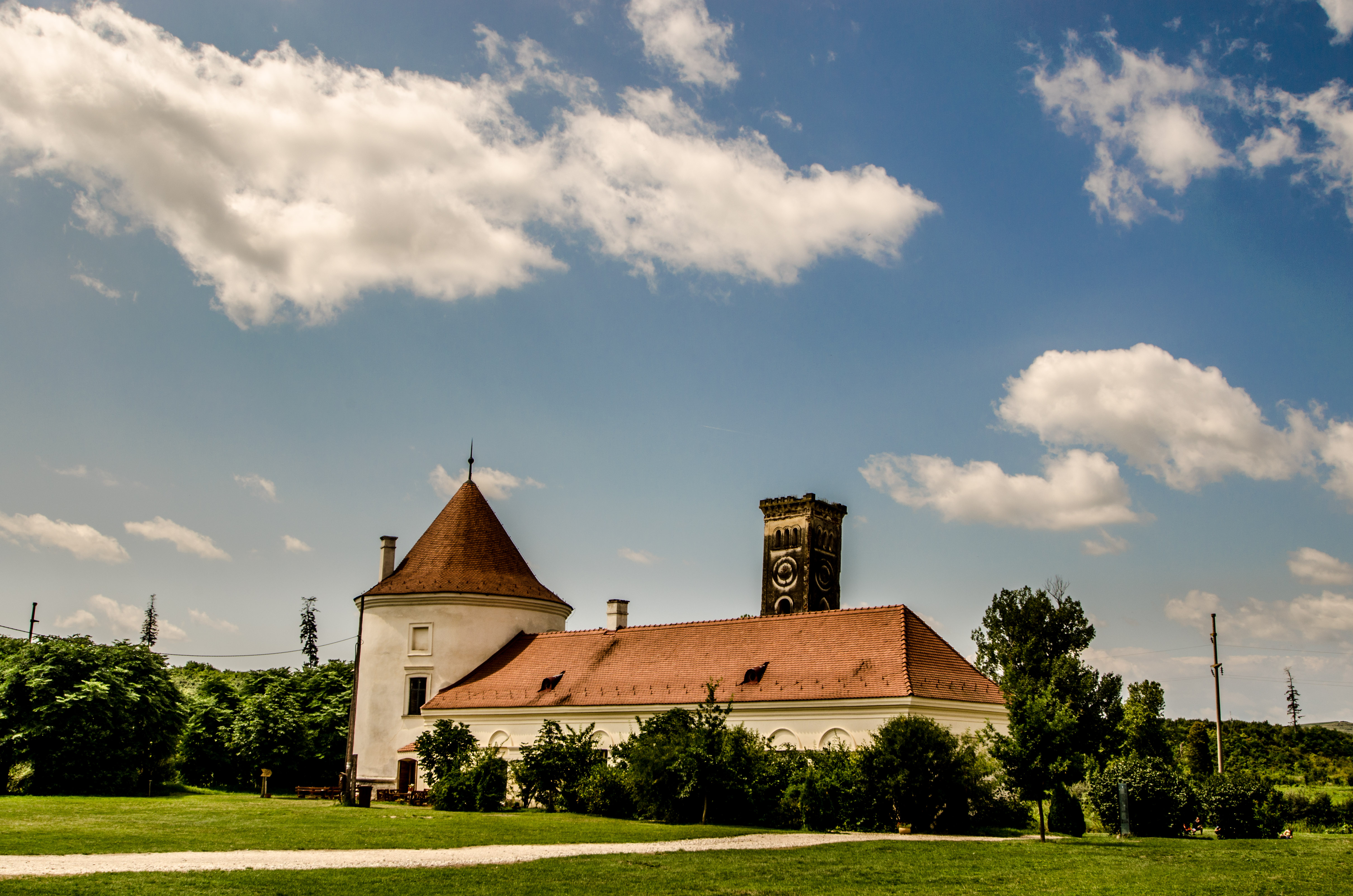
Bánffy Castle in renovation

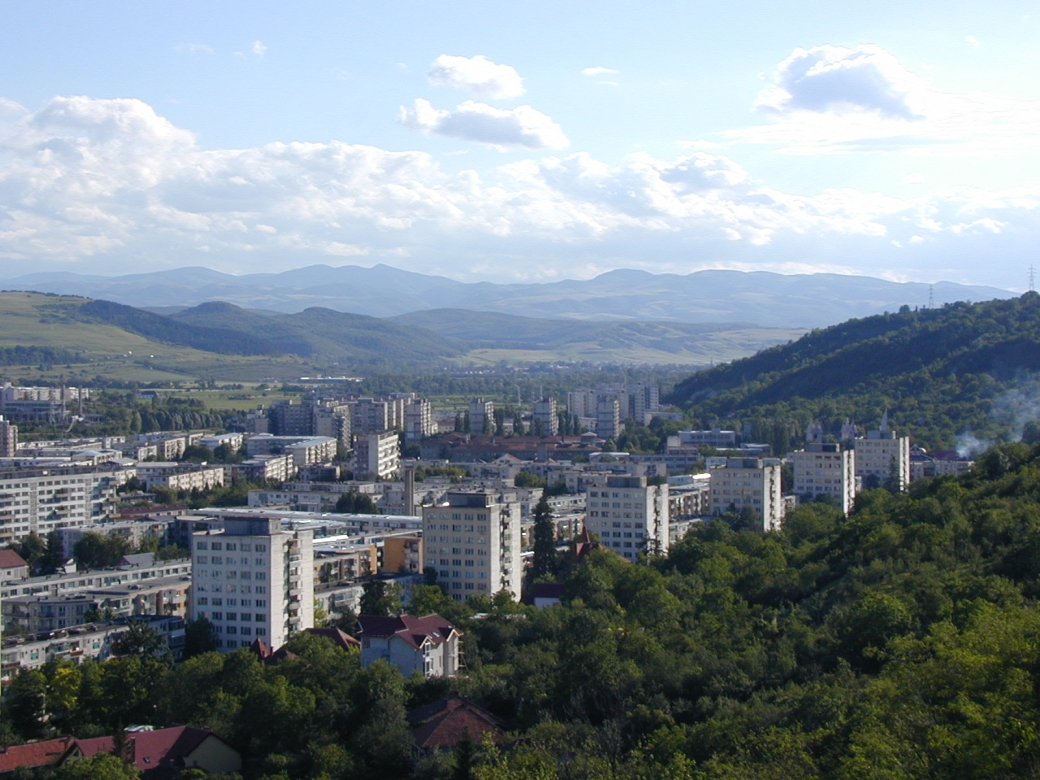
The southern slope of Hoia Hill and Grigorescu District of Cluj-Napoca

- Bánffy Castle in Bonțida – Dubbed "the Versailles of Transylvania", the castle is reportedly haunted by the ghost of a young servant who paid with his life because he revealed that his mistress deceived her husband. Another variant is that the place is haunted by the ghosts of those who died in Bánffy during the Second World War, when the castle was converted by Germans into a military hospital. Legend says that there were often seen sinister shadows that seemed to be of some soldiers, while through walls were heard strange noises, groans, sounds of footsteps, or indistinct voices.
- Hoia Forest – The forest near Cluj-Napoca has long been known for the mysterious events that take place here and was even cataloged as a gateway to another dimension. Dubbed "the Bermuda Triangle of Transylvania", the forest is one of the most active areas of the world in terms of paranormal phenomena. Legends would have occurred, it seems, after a shepherd disappeared into the forest along with his 200 sheep and no one managed to find neither he nor any part of the flock. It was only the first mysterious disappearance that took place in the forest. People who accidentally pass right through active areas report skin burns, redness, irritations, headaches, amplified sensation of thirst, anxiety, sensation of fainting. Hoia Forest became famous in the world after on 18 August 1968, military technician Emil Barnea photographed in the Round Glade (Romanian: Poiana Rotundă) a UFO, the photos being among the few of this kind genuine, according to experts. Numerous accounts of villagers reported unexplained physical sensations, observations of various shapes and colors lights, strange shadows, voices, and human faces. The local vegetation is often bizarre. The trees have strange shapes, even human faces can be depicted from their trunks. In 2000, Alexandru Pătruț, President of the Romanian Society of Parapsychology, caught a strange phenomenon in the forest, around the Easter: a kind of sap flowed profusely from the top of the trees. Next day, everything was dry. He also reported strange sounds of ambulance sirens, tire exploding, and even cuckoo clock. The forest was included in top 15 most haunted places in the world by the American magazine Travel+Leisure.

== Constanța County ==
- Tomis Nord neighbourhood from Constanța Supposedly, the neighbourhood is haunted by a woman who was decapitated by her husband who believed that he was cheated on.

== Dâmbovița County ==
- Bride's Trinity on DN7 – On national road DN7, near the town of Găești, there is a monument called Bride's Trinity or Margareta's Trinity. Here it is said that on 24 September 1936, Margareta Ștefănescu died in a car accident, even on her wedding day, and since then the place has become cursed. In the area have occurred a lot of fatal crashes, even if the road is straight and with maximum visibility. The road was "baptized" by locals "the Road of Crosses". In the road tragedies are involved especially men. For example, only in 2008–09 in that place 12 young men died, mostly unmarried. Likewise, there were several reports of a silhouette of woman dressed in white near the trinity.

== Dolj County ==
- Bulzești - Villagers talk about the "creatures by the hill". A long time ago, the village was moved because of the strigoi. According to a villager:"The evil spirits haunt us at both day and night. Nobody dares to go up the hill because of the vampires. A neighbour has paralyzed many years ago when he bumped into one of the evil spirits. He couldn't find his peace and does bad things to all those around him" The Romanian poet Marin Sorescu, born in the commune, mentioned the legend in his poem "Dumneata": One night, here, by the fountains, / Where homes are rare, due to the ghosts / Who they say have showed around / And the people were strained to put houses there, for the ghosts to have their place.(...)
- Radovan Forest – Dozens of people, especially men, have drowned over time in Lake Fântânele of Radovan. Locals put numerous tragedies on account of the curse of a bride, who legend says that in the 1940s hanged herself in the forest surrounding the lake. Her story has two versions: one, according to that a young Moldovan woman arrived in Oltenia with her family, would have committed suicide after her husband was beaten to death on the night of the wedding; the second version says that she has committed suicide after, even before the wedding, would have been raped by a kulak that employed her. Locals say the bride haunts the road near the forest, and the passers are advised to move quickly and try to simply overlook any sound or appearance, otherwise the bride will lead them in the heart of the forest, from where they won't ever return.

== Iași County ==
- House of Gavril Buzatu on Manta Roșie – In this house from Iași lived Gavril Buzatu, "the last executioner of Moldova". The house was the site of several killings and atrocities. It is reportedly haunted by strigoi about people think would be the thieves beheaded by Gavril Buzatu. During the night can be heard howls of beast or human, followed by roars of laughter. Here can be seen strange lights that "run" through the mansion, especially during the winter. A former tenant reported a black creature running through the nearby forest. Likewise, were seen flames lighting up suddenly in the abandoned salons.
- Lungani Hill – It is said that the hill that separates the villages of Goești and Brăești is haunted by thousands of ghosts of soldiers from the World War I. Locals reported white lights, silhouettes of soldiers descending from the cemetery into the valley, at night, late after 12 o'clock. On the other side of the hill, in the commune of Lungani, peasants saw headless people who went on the road or even the devil in the body of child or cat.

== Maramureș County ==
- E58 near Cicârlău – The area is known by drivers as one where many accidents happen. The accidents are attributed to a ghost which is said that comes out from the crops and scares the drivers. In the 1930s, a young woman named Pălăguța, envied by women for her beauty, was accused of witchcraft and beaten to death. Old people speak about a kind of animal with very long legs which haunted the village in Tuesday nights. It is said that appeared after midnight and went to houses where women violated the church rule. Women would have been hit in the temple and died or remained paralyzed.

== Prahova County ==
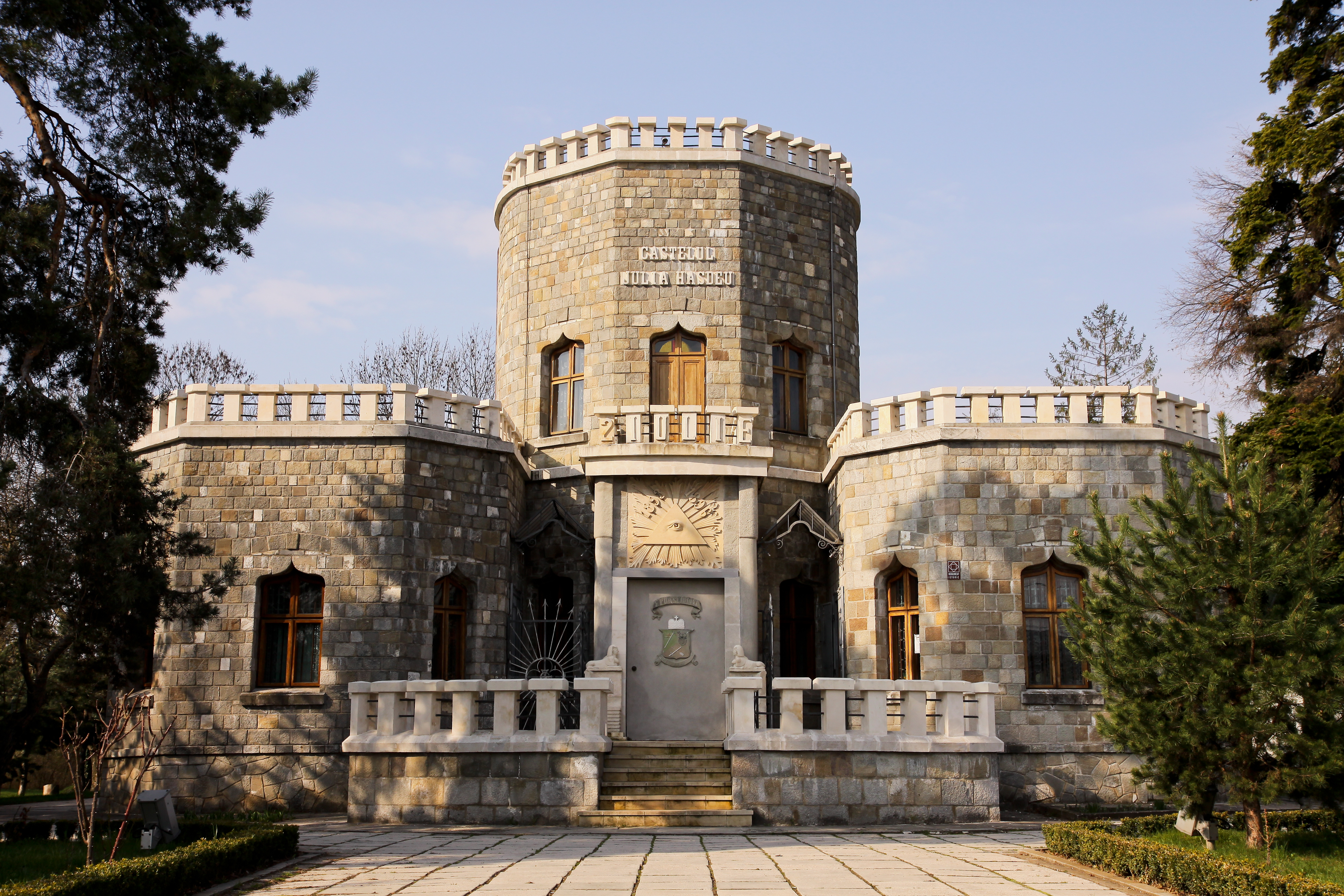
Iulia Hasdeu Castle

- Iulia Hasdeu Castle in Câmpina – Bizarre by its architecture, Iulia Hasdeu Castle was built by writer Bogdan Petriceicu Hasdeu in the memory of Iulia Hasdeu, his daughter, who died at age 19. It is said that the castle was built in accordance with the indications received during some seances, from his dead daughter. Locals say that during the night, Iulia Hasdeu can be heard playing the piano, in father's applause.

== See also ==
- List of reportedly haunted locations in the world
- List of ghosts
