= Hasdeu =

Hasdeu (Romanian pronunciation: [haʃˈdew]) is a Romanian surname. Notable people with the surname include:

- Bogdan Petriceicu Hasdeu (1838–1907)
  - Bogdan Petriceicu Hasdeu National College
- Iulia Hasdeu (1869–1888)
  - Iulia Hasdeu Castle, a folly house

== See also ==
- Hâjdău
