= Albești (Bahlueț) =

- Location within Romania

Location
- Country: Romania
- Counties: Iași County
- Villages: Brăești, Albești, Lungani

Physical characteristics
- Mouth: Bahlueț
  - coordinates: 47.2041°N 27.1482°E
- Length: 18 km (11 mi)
- Basin size: 54 km^{2} (21 sq mi)

Basin features
- Progression: Bahlueț→ Bahlui→ Jijia→ Prut→ Danube→ Black Sea
- Tributaries
  - right: Goești
- River code: XIII.1.15.32.12.6

The Albești is a right tributary of the river Bahlueț in Romania. It flows into the Bahlueț in Mădârjești. Its length is 18 km (11 mi) and its basin size is 54 km^{2} (21 sq mi).
