= Bahlueț =

- Location within Romania

Location
- Country: Romania
- Counties: Iași County
- Towns: Târgu Frumos, Podu Iloaiei

Physical characteristics
- Mouth: Bahlui
  - location: Podu Iloaiei
  - coordinates: 47.2093°N 27.2947°E
- Length: 41 km (25 mi)
- Basin size: 551 km^{2} (213 sq mi)
- Discharge
  - location: mouth
  - average: 1.06 m3/s

Basin features
- Progression: Bahlui→ Jijia→ Prut→ Danube→ Black Sea

The Bahlueț (also: Bahluieț) is a right tributary of the river Bahlui in Romania. It discharges into the Bahlui in Podu Iloaiei. Its length is 41 km (25 mi) and its basin size is 551 km^{2} (213 sq mi).

== Tributaries ==
The following rivers are tributaries to the river Bahlueț (from source to mouth):

- Left: Pășcănia, Probota, Cucuteni, Valea Oii
- Right: Rediu, Ciunca, Albești, Sinești, Hărpășești
