= Alice Voinescu =

Romanian writer, essayist, lecturer, theatre critic and translator

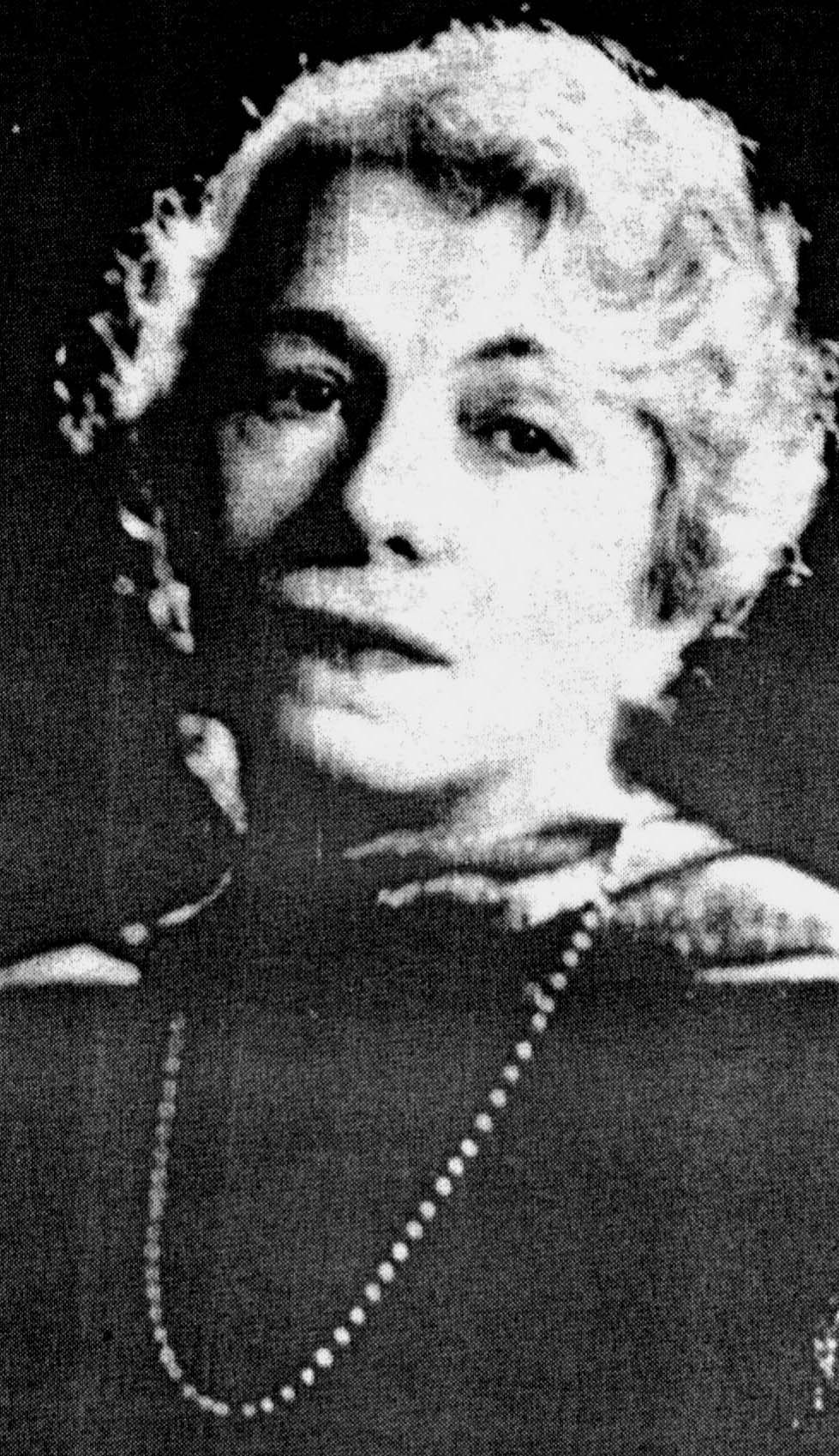
- Voinescu in 1948
- Born: Alice Steriadi; 10 February 1885; Turnu-Severin, Kingdom of Romania
- Died: 4 June 1961 (aged 76); Bucharest, Romanian People's Republic
- Other name: Alice Steriadi Voinescu
- Occupations: Writer, essayist, university professor, theatre critic, translator

Academic background
- Education: University of Bucharest; University of Paris
- Thesis: L'Interprétation de la doctrine de Kant par l'École de Marburg: Étude sur l'idéalisme critique (1913)
- Doctoral advisor: Lucien Lévy-Bruhl

Alice Voinescu (10 February 1885 – 4 June 1961) was a Romanian writer, essayist, university professor, theatre critic, and translator.

She was the first Romanian woman to become a Doctor of Philosophy, which she did at the Sorbonne in 1913 in Paris. In 1922, she became a professor of theatrical history at what would become the Royal Academy of Music and Dramatic Arts in Bucharest, where she taught for over two decades. In 1948, she was removed from her department and spent a year and seven months in prisons in Jilava and Ghencea. After her detention, she was kept under house arrest in the village of Costești near Târgu Frumos until 1954. Posthumously, her diary covering the interwar and communist period of Romania's history was discovered and published in 1997.

== Early life ==
Alice Steriadi was born on 10 February 1885 in Turnu-Severin, Kingdom of Romania to Massinca (née Poenaru) and Sterie Steriadi. She was one of three daughters, born to the upper-middle-class family, headed by her father who was a Paris-educated lawyer. Her mother's family descended from Petrache Poenaru, the noted educational reformer, and the couple provided a Western-European education for their daughters. By the age of five, Steriadi was able to read both Romanian and German and by age six, she was studying French. She studied at the Lyceum in Turnu-Severin before enrolling at the University of Bucharest.

After she graduated in 1908 from the Faculty of Letters and Philosophy in Bucharest, Steriadi went on an academic tour of Europe, studying first at Leipzig University, with Theodor Lipps and Johannes Volkelt, who introduced her to Hermann Cohen's work on Immanuel Kant. Next she went to Munich and by 1910 had arrived in Paris to study at the Sorbonne. During the spring of 1911, Steriadi went to Marburg, Germany, where she audited classes given at the University of Marburg with Cohen. She continued her education in Paris at the Sorbonne, studying under Lucien Lévy-Bruhl, earning a PhD magna cum laude in philosophy in 1913, with her successful defence of her thesis, The Interpretation of Kant's Doctrine by the Marburg School: A Study in Critical Idealism (French: L'Interprétation de la doctrine de Kant par l'École de Marburg: Étude sur l'idéalisme critique).

Steriadi was the first Romanian woman to earn a doctorate in philosophy and received offers to continue her education in the United States or stay in Paris to become a lecturer. Instead, she returned to Romania in 1915 and married the lawyer Stelian Voinescu. The marriage would prove to be an unhappy union. She joined the Christian Association of Women (Romanian: Asociația Creștină a Femeilor (ACF)), which was founded in 1919 by Queen Marie of Romania to provide a variety of philanthropic programs in the interwar period. The organization was aimed at providing upper- and middle-class Romanian women with ways to provide moral and charitable guidance by adopting the orthodox characterization of women, as empathetic mothers able to shape the social fabric of society through their love and devotion.

== Career ==
As there was no avenue for a woman to teach at the University of Bucharest at that time, in 1922, Voinescu joined the faculty of the Conservatory of Music and Dramatic Art, renamed as the Royal Conservatory in 1931. She lectured on aesthetics, theory and the history of theatre. She began broadcasting educational programs on the radio in 1924. Between 1928 and 1939, Voinescu traveled annually to France to participate in conferences organized by Paul Desjardins at Pontigny Abbey. The meetings brought together international intellectuals to evaluate the future of Europe after World War I. Among those she met there were Charles du Bos, Roger Martin du Gard, André Gide, Paul Langevin, André Malraux, François Mauriac, and Jacques Rivière. At one of these meetings in 1929, du Gard questioned why she did not keep a journal. From that point on, Voinescu became a diarist, keeping careful record of the personalities and events she encountered day to day, though often with long gaps between entries.

Between 1932 and 1942 she made a series of radio presentations evaluating women's place in Romanian society. Some of the topics included Directions in Women's Education, The Psychology of Today’s Working Women, The Psychology of Today’s Youth, which considered whether intellect and femininity were at odds. Voinescu believed that education improved women's ability to be agents of empathy and the moral caregivers of society. She was ambivalent towards women's groups which were based on a Western model and strove for emancipation of women, because she felt that they did not address the Romanian reality. In her radio speeches, she warned that erasing gender differences would result in women being limited by a male view of identity.

Voinescu began publishing, with such works as Montaigne, omul și opera (Montaigne, life and work, 1936); Aspecte din teatrul contemporan (Aspects of contemporary theatre, 1941); and Eschil (Aeschylus, 1946). She also contributed to the Istoria filosofiei moderne (History of Modern Philosophy, 1936) with works evaluating French scepticism and neo-Kantianism. She contributed to Ideea europeană magazine and published the theatre column for Revista Fundațiilor Regale. During this same time, she also began teaching at the School of Social Work, which inspired a brochure Contribution dans la Psychologie dans l'Assistance Sociale en Roumanie (Contributions to the psychology of social work in Romania, 1938), as well as writing theatre critiques. While continuing to teach at the Royal Conservatory, she also lectured at the French Institute and the Free University of Bucharest. Between 1939 and 1940, Voinescu prepared a publication about four playwrights discussing the works of Paul Claudel, Luigi Pirandello, George Bernard Shaw, and Frank Wedekind. She also wrote a condemnation of those who had assassinated Nicolae Iorga. Her husband died in 1940 and after his death, her journal entries intimately related to him as a confidant, which she had not experienced during his lifetime due to his numerous infidelities.

In 1948, under the nascent communist regime, Voinescu was forcibly retired and to relive the stress, began work on Scrisori către fiul și fiica mea (Letters to My Son and Daughter), a fictional work addressed to children that the childless Voinescu never had. The work would not be published until after her death. In 1951, she was accused of being a monarchist and of hiding her support for King Michael I after his forced abdication. Arrested after attending intellectual resistance conferences held by Petru Manoliu at the Free University, Voinescu was held for a year at the Ghencea camp before being sent to the Prison. She spent nineteen months in prison and then was kept under house arrest in a small village of Costești in Iași County in the northern part of the country for another year. The village was very isolated, being impossible to reach except by horseback during spring and autumn rains, and with roads completely impassible in winter due to blizzard conditions. Voinescu was even forbidden to attend church to limit her contact with people. Friends, such as Petru Groza, Mihail Jora, and Tudor Vianu, intervened with authorities to secure her release with a small pension.

Voinescu returned home in 1954 and worked as a literary translator for such works as Michael Kohlhaas by Heinrich von Kleist and short stories by Thomas Mann. The work kept her busy and wasn't likely to have the same political repercussions as creating her own works. In 1960 and 1961, she worked on Întâlnire cu eroi din literatură și teatru (Encounters with Heroes in Literature and Drama, 1983) and occasionally was asked to make translations for colleagues.

== Death and legacy ==
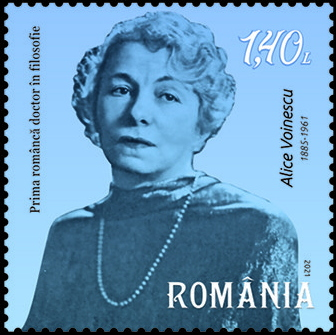
Voinescu on a 2021 stamp of Romania

Voinescu died during the night of 3–4 June 1961. She is buried at Bellu Cemetery, in Bucharest.

In 1983, the Eminescu Publishing House released Tragic Heroes, edited by Valeriu Râpeanu and then in 1994 Letters to My Son and Daughter was published. In 1997, Maria Ana Murnu edited and published with Editura Albatros, The Journal, Voinescu's rediscovered diaries, which was reissued in 2013 by Biblioteca Polirom. The Journal included notes about cultural personalities from the interwar and postwar periods; her relationships with other people, particularly her interactions with the villagers during her confinement; and her musings on historical and social issues during the time which had been obscured behind political agenda. She explored candidly her experiences, such as her abhorrence of anti-Semitism and the propaganda justifying government confiscations and nationalization of properties of Romanian Jews, while simultaneously pondering whether she would be able to obtain one of those houses to alleviate the financial straits in which her husband's death had left her. She decried the persecution of the Romani people and her frustrations of the vulnerability women faced because of societal restrictions. Scrisori din Costești (Letters from Costești), written during her house arrest, was published in 2001.
