= Cucuteni (disambiguation) =

Cucuteni may refer to the following places in Romania:

- Cucuteni, a commune in Iași County
- Cucuteni–Trypillia culture
- Cucuteni, a village in the commune Durnești, Botoșani County
- Cucuteni, a village in the commune Moțăieni, Dâmbovița County
- Cucuteni, a village in the commune Lețcani, Iași County
- Cucuteni (river), a tributary of the Bahlueț in Iași County
