= Sinești (Bahlueț) =

- Location within Romania

Location
- Country: Romania
- Counties: Iași County
- Villages: Sinești, Bocnița, Zmeu

Physical characteristics
- Mouth: Bahlueț
  - location: Budăi
  - coordinates: 47.2106°N 27.1963°E
- Length: 18 km (11 mi)
- Basin size: 97 km^{2} (37 sq mi)

Basin features
- Progression: Bahlueț→ Bahlui→ Jijia→ Prut→ Danube→ Black Sea
- Tributaries
  - right: Gâmboasa
- River code: XIII.1.15.32.12.8

The Sinești is a right tributary of the river Bahlueț in Romania. It flows into the Bahlueț in Budăi. Its length is 18 km (11 mi) and its basin size is 97 km^{2} (37 sq mi).
