= Sinești =

Sinești may refer to:

Romania

- Sinești, Ialomița
- Sinești, Iași
- Sinești, Vâlcea
- Sinești, a village in the commune Cuca, Argeș County
- Sinești, a district in the town of Potcoava, Olt County
- Sinești (Bahlueț), a tributary of the Bahlueț in Iași County
- Sinești, a tributary of the Valea Boului in Buzău County

Moldova

- Sinești, Ungheni
