= Ciunca =

- Location within Romania

Location
- Country: Romania
- Counties: Iași County

Physical characteristics
- Mouth: Bahlueț
  - coordinates: 47.2094°N 27.0519°E
- Length: 13 km (8.1 mi)
- Basin size: 88 km^{2} (34 sq mi)

Basin features
- Progression: Bahlueț→ Bahlui→ Jijia→ Prut→ Danube→ Black Sea
- Tributaries
  - left: Lunca, Bahna
- River code: XIII.1.15.32.12.5

The Ciunca is a right tributary of the river Bahlueț in Romania. It flows into the Bahlueț in Ion Neculce. Its length is 13 km (8.1 mi) and its basin size is 88 km^{2} (34 sq mi).
