= Valea Oii =

- Location within Romania

Location
- Country: Romania
- Counties: Iași County
- Villages: Băiceni, Balș, Valea Oilor, Sârca

Physical characteristics
- Mouth: Bahlueț
  - coordinates: 47.218°N 27.187°E
- Length: 31 km (19 mi)
- Basin size: 97 km^{2} (37 sq mi)
- Discharge
  - average: 0.202 m3/s

Basin features
- Progression: Bahlueț→ Bahlui→ Jijia→ Prut→ Danube→ Black Sea

The Valea Oii is a left tributary of the river Bahlueț in Romania. It flows into the Bahlueț in Sârca. Its length is 31 km (19 mi) and its basin size is 97 km^{2} (37 sq mi). The Sârca Reservoir is located on this river.
