= Hâjdău =

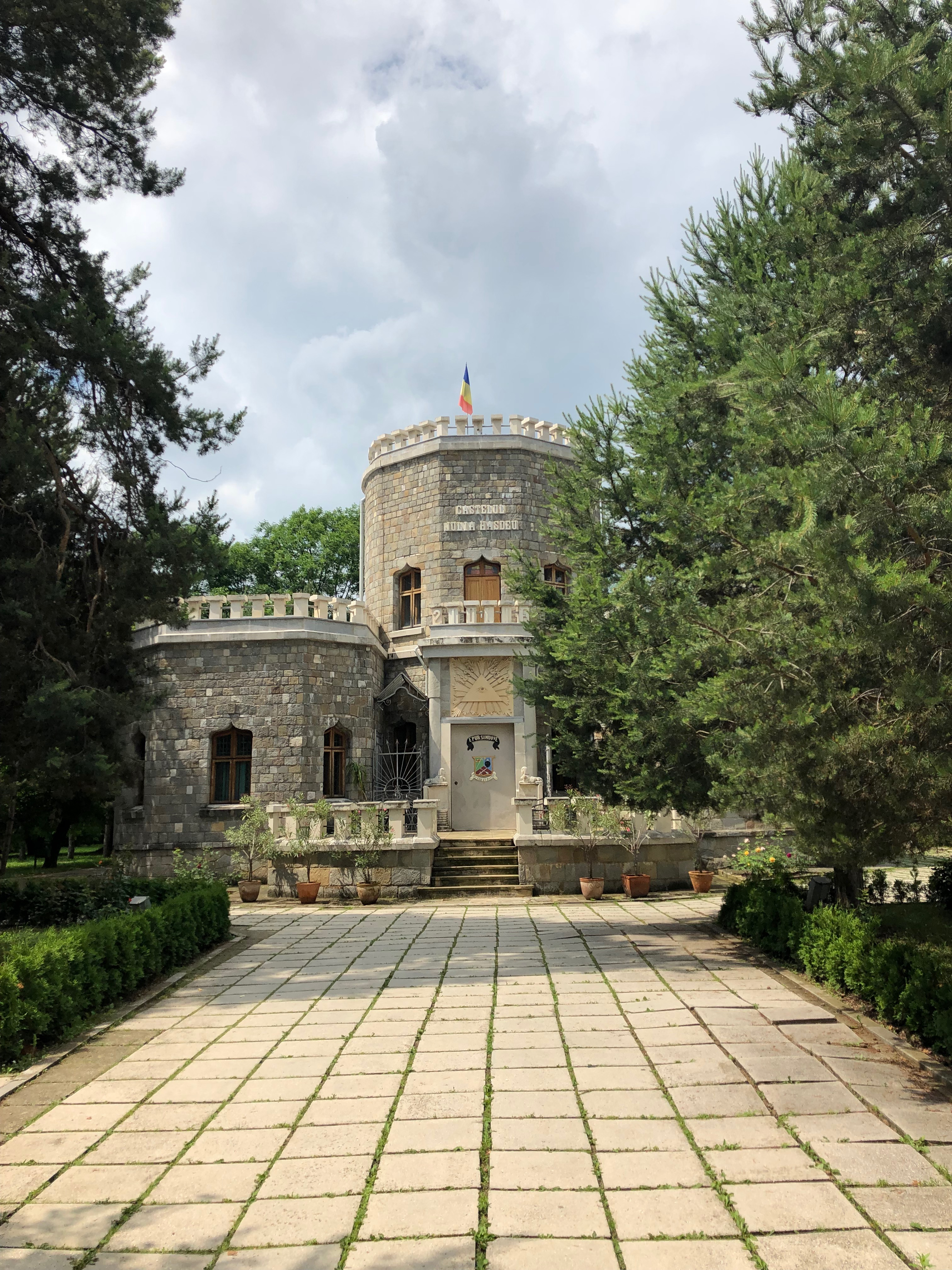
Iulia Hasdeu Castle

The Hâjdău family (with several spelling versions, such as Hâjdeu, Hasdeu, Hîjdău, etc.) was the name of a Romanian boyar family from Bessarabia, who activated in Poland, Russian Empire, and Romania.

== History ==
The founders of the Bessarabian line of the family are Ioan Hâjdău and Nicolae Hâjdău, the nephews of Prince Stefan Petriceicu from his sister. She was married to a paharnic Lupașco Hâjdău, who died in 1673 at Hotin, in a battle against the Ottomans, son of a Ștefan Hâjdău. After the prince's rebellion against the Turks, the two brothers will leave Moldavia, for fear of repressions, and will accompany their uncle to Poland. There, they will receive, in 1676, the Polish indygenat. The Hâjdăus who did not leave the country lost their status very quickly. When Tadeu Hâjdău returns to Moldavia, in order to claim the lost domains of his family, he finds that the descendants of the Hâjdău boyar family were now peasants and butchers, of very humble condition. Several members of the auto-exiled line will affirm themselves as writers in the 19th century:

== Notable members ==
- Tadeu Hâjdău
- Alexandru Hâjdeu
- Boleslav Hâjdău
- Bogdan Petriceicu Hasdeu
- Iulia Hasdeu
