= Crucea =

Crucea may refer to several places in Romania:

- Crucea, Constanța, a commune in Constanța County
- Crucea, Suceava, a commune in Suceava County
- Crucea, a village in Lungani Commune, Iași County
- Crucea de Jos and Crucea de Sus, villages administered by Panciu town, Vrancea County
