= Giurgești =

Giurgeşti may refer to several villages in Romania:

- Giurgeşti, a village in Bulzeștii de Sus Commune, Hunedoara County
- Giurgeşti, a village in Costeşti Commune, Iaşi County
- Giurgeşti, a village in Vultureşti Commune, Suceava County
- Giurgeşti, a village in Tătărăni Commune, Vaslui County
- Ciceu-Giurgești, a commune in Bistriţa-Năsăud County
