= Pășcănia =

- Location within Romania

Location
- Country: Romania
- Counties: Iași County
- Villages: Bărbătești

Physical characteristics
- Mouth: Bahlueț
  - coordinates: 47.2450°N 26.9107°E
- Length: 10 km (6.2 mi)
- Basin size: 12 km^{2} (4.6 sq mi)

Basin features
- Progression: Bahlueț→ Bahlui→ Jijia→ Prut→ Danube→ Black Sea
- River code: XIII.1.15.32.12.1

The Pășcănia is a left tributary of the river Bahlueț in Romania. It flows into the Bahlueț in Giurgești. Its length is 10 km (6.2 mi) and its basin size is 12 km^{2} (4.6 sq mi).
