= Sârca =

Sârca may refer to several places in Romania:

- Sârca, a village in Bălțați Commune, Iași County
- Sârca, a village in Scorțeni Commune, Prahova County
