= Podișu =

Podișu may refer to several villages in Romania:

- Podișu, a village in Bălțați Commune, Iași County
- Podișu, a village in Ileanda Commune, Sălaj County
