= Osoi =

Osoi may refer to several villages in Romania:

- Osoi, a village in Recea-Cristur Commune, Cluj County
- Osoi, a village in Comarna Commune, Iaşi County
- Osoi, a village in Sineşti Commune, Iaşi County
- Osoi, a village in Vultureşti Commune, Suceava County
