= Hărpășești =

- Location within Romania

Location
- Country: Romania
- Counties: Iași County

Physical characteristics
- Mouth: Bahlueț
  - coordinates: 47.2088°N 27.2927°E
- Length: 12 km (7.5 mi)
- Basin size: 28 km^{2} (11 sq mi)

Basin features
- Progression: Bahlueț→ Bahlui→ Jijia→ Prut→ Danube→ Black Sea
- River code: XIII.1.15.32.12.9

The Hărpășești is a right tributary of the river Bahlueț in Romania. It flows into the Bahlueț in Scobâlțeni. Its length is 12 km (7.5 mi) and its basin size is 28 km^{2} (11 sq mi).
