= Dădești =

Dădești may refer to several villages in Romania:

- Dădești, a village in Vultureni Commune, Bacău County
- Dădești, a village in Ion Neculce Commune, Iași County
