= Rediu (Bahlueț) =

- Location within Romania

Location
- Country: Romania
- Counties: Iași County

Physical characteristics
- Mouth: Bahlueț
  - coordinates: 47.2044°N 27.0141°E
- Length: 14 km (8.7 mi)
- Basin size: 42 km^{2} (16 sq mi)

Basin features
- Progression: Bahlueț→ Bahlui→ Jijia→ Prut→ Danube→ Black Sea
- River code: XIII.1.15.32.12.4

The Rediu is a right tributary of the river Bahlueț in Romania. It flows into the Bahlueț in Târgu Frumos. Its length is 14 km (8.7 mi) and its basin size is 42 km^{2} (16 sq mi).
