= Gabriela Crețu =

Romanian politician (born 1965)

Gabriela Creţu (born January 16, 1965) is a Romanian politician and member of the Social Democratic Party (PSD), part of the Party of European Socialists. Elected to the Chamber of Deputies for Vaslui County in the 2004 elections, she became a Member of the European Parliament on January 1, 2007, with the accession of Romania to the European Union.

== Biography ==
Born in Târgu Frumos, Creţu graduated from the Iaşi High School of Economic and Administrative Law (1983), and then from the Faculty of Philosophy at the University of Iaşi (1987). She later specialized in Gender studies, Political communications, Gender mainstreaming, and Political campaigning. In 1998, Creţu took her PhD in Epistemology and the Philosophy of science. She has authored and published several essays in the field.

Between 1987 and 2004, she taught Social science at high schools in Vaslui. Having joined the National Salvation Front in 1990, she followed it into the transformations that led to its transformation into the present-day PSD; since 1998, she serves on the party's National Council; until 2001, she was also Secretary of the PSD Women's Forum, and, since 2005, she is Vice President of the National Social Democratic Women's Organization.

As a deputy, Creţu served on the Committee for Culture, Arts, and Mass-Media. She is the mother of one son.
