= Cucuteni (river) =

- Location within Romania

Location
- Country: Romania
- Counties: Iași County
- Villages: Cucuteni

Physical characteristics
- Mouth: Bahlueț
  - coordinates: 47.2102°N 26.9966°E
- Length: 11 km (6.8 mi)
- Basin size: 13 km^{2} (5.0 sq mi)

Basin features
- Progression: Bahlueț→ Bahlui→ Jijia→ Prut→ Danube→ Black Sea
- River code: XIII.1.15.32.12.3

The Cucuteni is a left tributary of the river Bahlueț in Romania. It flows into the Bahlueț in the town Târgu Frumos. Its length is 11 km (6.8 mi) and its basin size is 13 km^{2} (5.0 sq mi).
