= Moțăieni =

- Commune
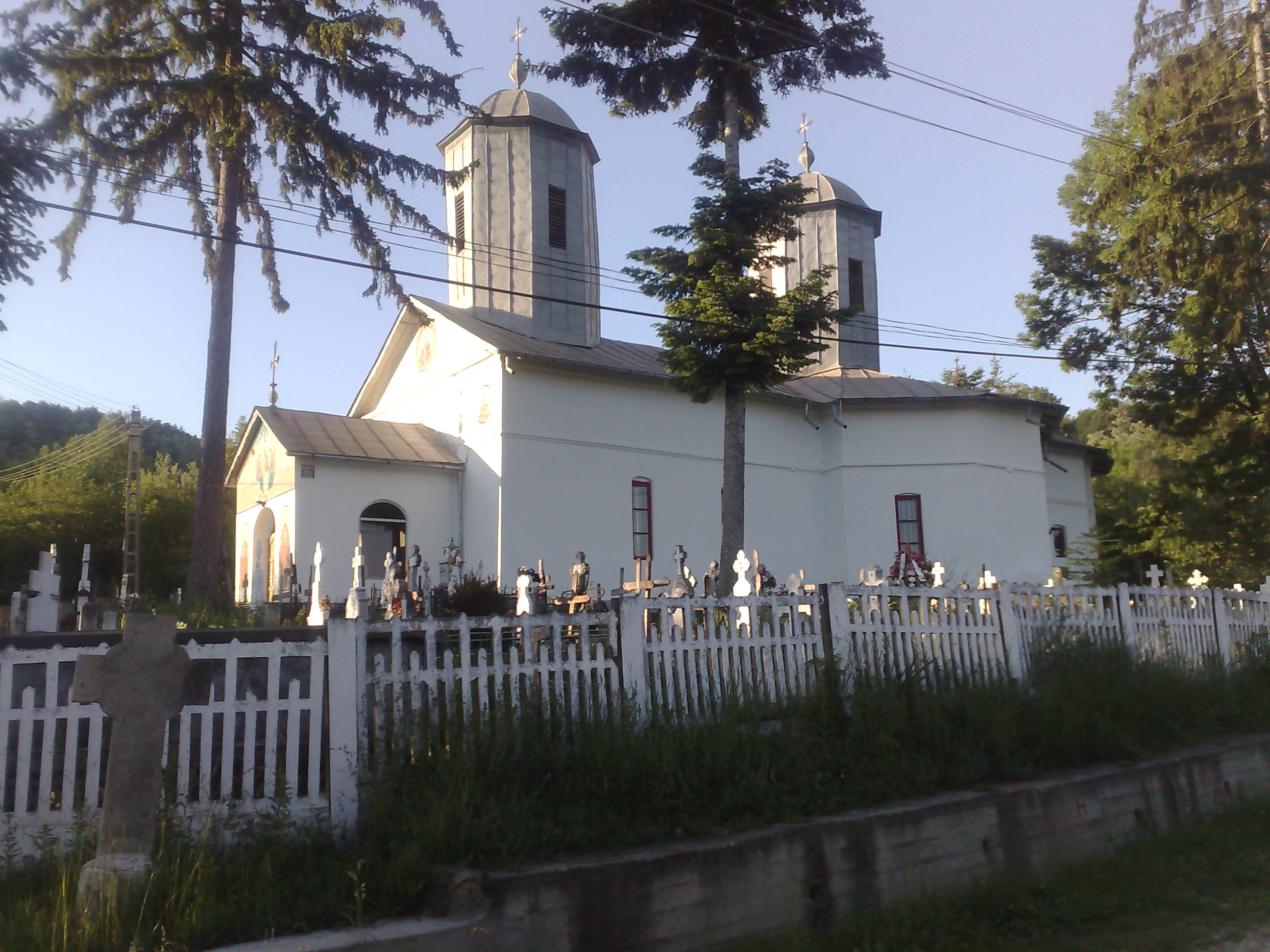
- Church in Cucuteni

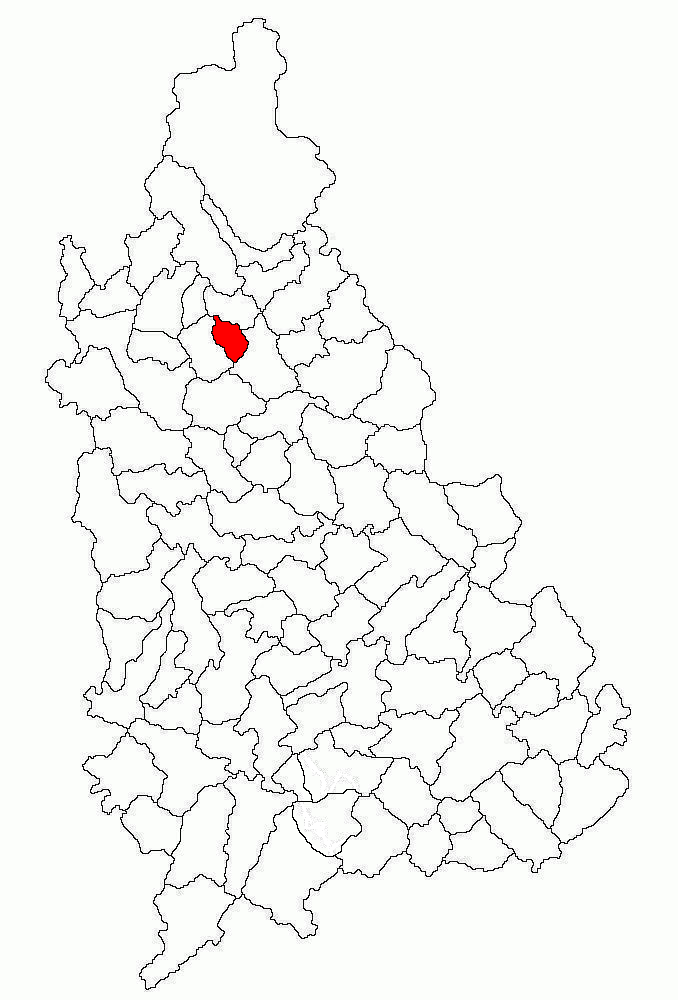
- Location in Dâmbovița County

- Location in Romania
- Coordinates: 45°6′N 25°25′E
- Country: Romania
- County: Dâmbovița

Government
  - Mayor (2024–2028): Florin Iordache (PNL)
- Elevation: 423 m (1,388 ft)
- Population (2021-12-01): 1,876
- Time zone: UTC+02:00 (EET)
  - Summer (DST): UTC+03:00 (EEST)
- Postal code: 137325
- Area code: +(40) 245
- Vehicle reg.: DB
- Website: www.primariamotaieni.ro

Moțăieni is a commune in Dâmbovița County, Muntenia, Romania with a population of 1,876 people as of 2021. It is composed of two villages, Cucuteni and Moțăieni.

Historical population
Year	Pop.	±%
2002	2,246	—
2011	2,069	−7.9%
2021	1,876	−9.3%
Source: Census data
