= Iulia Hasdeu Castle =

Castle in Romania

Coordinates: 45.13567°N 25.7272°E

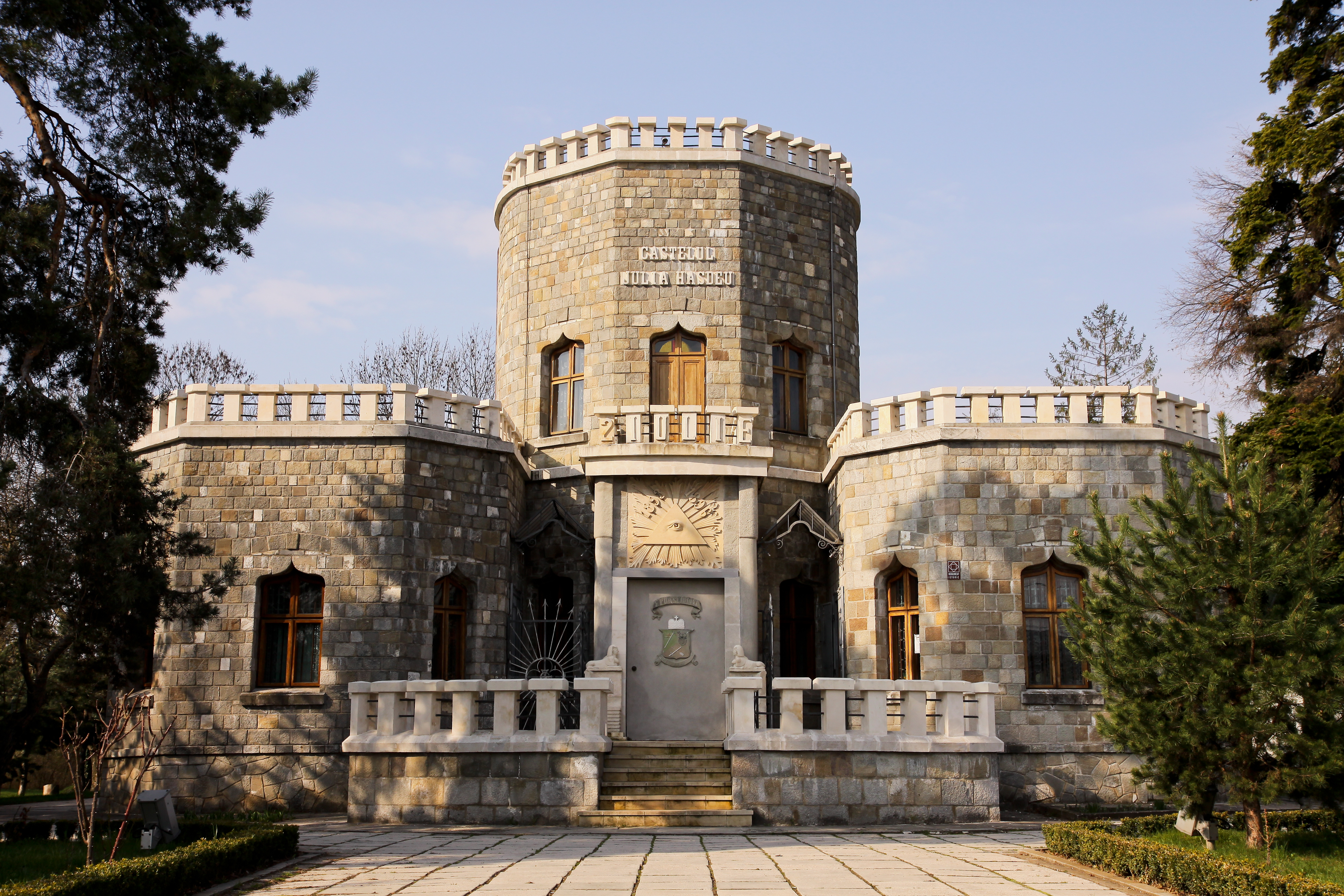
Iulia Hașdeu Castle

The Iulia Hașdeu Castle is a folly built in the form of a small castle by historian and politician Bogdan Petriceicu Hașdeu in the city of Câmpina, Romania. Work on it began in 1893, after Hasdeu's daughter, Iulia Hasdeu, died at the age of 18, an event that dramatically shook Hasdeu's life. He claimed that his late daughter provided the plans for building the castle during sessions of spiritism. The building was completed in 1896.

The Castle, which needed a lot of repair even when Hașdeu was alive, was affected by the First World War and in 1924 the People's Atheneum of Câmpina "B.P.Hasdeu" tried to take it for restoration. The castle was affected again by the Second World War and stayed in a damaged state till 1955, when its name was written in the Listing of Historical Monuments.

Since 1994 the Iulia Hașdeu Castle has housed the "B.P. Hașdeu” Memorial Museum which displays furniture and personal belongings of the Hașdeu family including photos, original documents, manuscripts, Hasdeu's reviews and pictures made by Nicolae Grigorescu and Sava Henția.

== See also ==
- List of castles in Romania
