= Ion Neculce, Iași =

Ion Neculce
- Commune
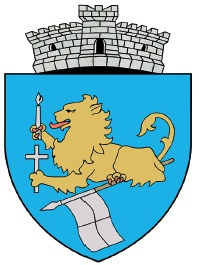
- Coat of arms

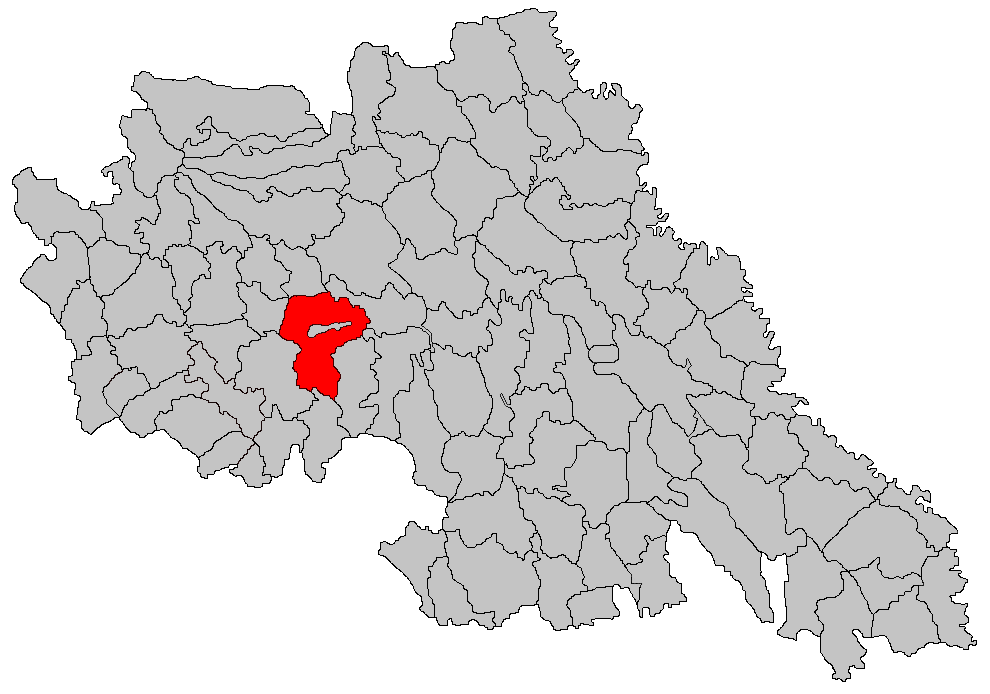
- Location in Iași County

- Location in Romania
- Coordinates: 47°12′N 27°3′E
- Country: Romania
- County: Iași
- Subdivisions: Buznea, Dădești, Gănești, Ion Neculce, Prigoreni, Războieni

Government
  - Mayor (2024–2028): Gheorghe Văleanu (PSD)
- Elevation: 100 m (300 ft)
- Population (2021-12-01): 5,503
- Time zone: EET/EEST (UTC+2/+3)
- Postal code: 705309
- Area code: +40 x32
- Vehicle reg.: IS
- Website: primaria-ionneculce.ro

Ion Neculce is a commune in Iași County, Western Moldavia, Romania. It is composed of six villages: Buznea, Dădești, Gănești, Ion Neculce, Prigoreni and Războieni. These belonged to Târgu Frumos town until 2004, when they were split off to form a separate commune.
