= Brăești, Iași =

Brăești
- Commune
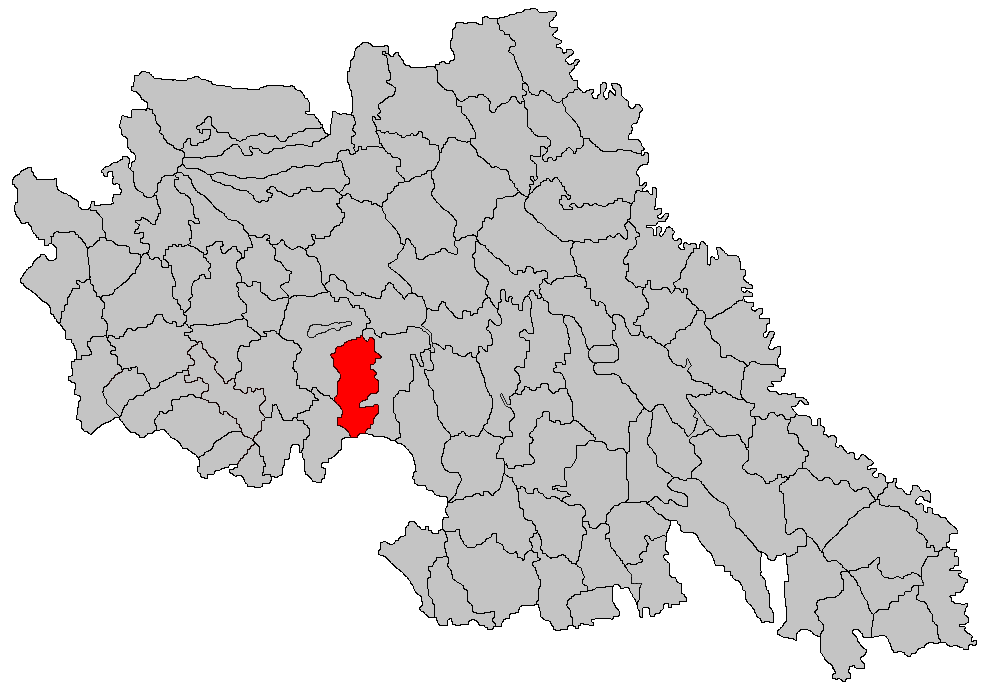
- Location in Iași County

- Location in Romania
- Coordinates: 47°09′N 27°06′E
- Country: Romania
- County: Iași
- Subdivisions: Brăești, Albești, Buda, Cristești, Rediu

Government
  - Mayor (2024–2028): Vasile Butnaru (PSD)
- Area: 53.21 km^{2} (20.54 sq mi)
- Elevation: 101 m (331 ft)
- Population (2021-12-01): 3,135
  - Density: 59/km^{2} (150/sq mi)
- Time zone: EET/EEST (UTC+2/+3)
- Postal code: 707060
- Area code: +40 x32
- Vehicle reg.: IS
- Website: primariabraesti.ro

Brăești is a commune in Iași County, Western Moldavia, Romania. It is composed of five villages: Albești, Brăești, Buda, Cristești and Rediu.
