= Costești, Iași =

Costești
- Commune
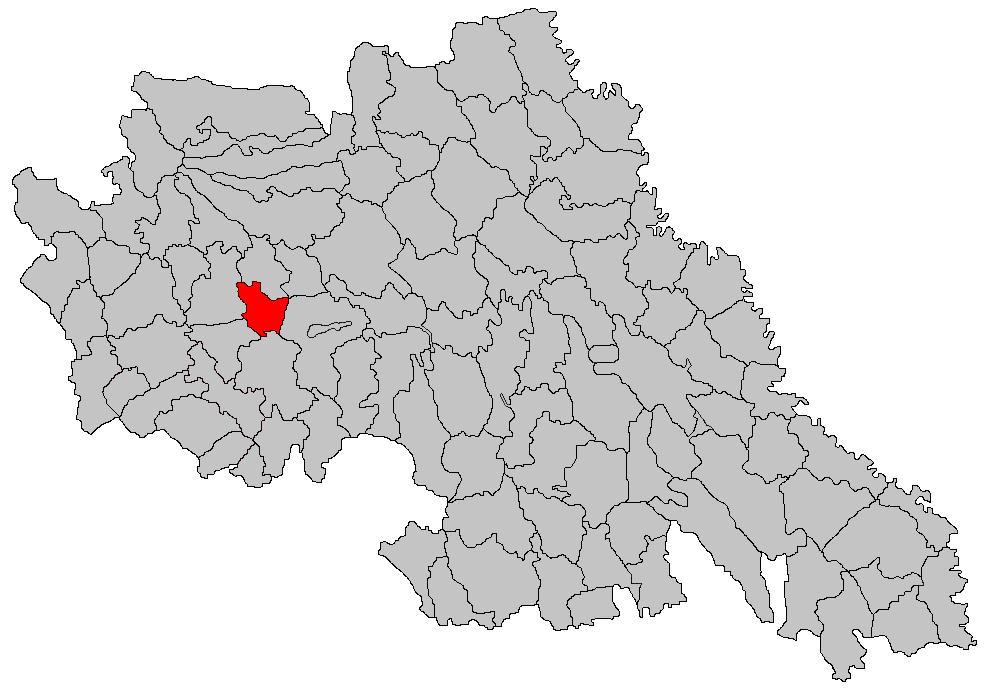
- Location in Iași County

- Location in Romania
- Coordinates: 47°14′N 26°56′E
- Country: Romania
- County: Iași
- Subdivisions: Costești, Giurgești

Government
  - Mayor (2024–2028): Aurel Doacă (PSD)
- Area: 19.27 km^{2} (7.44 sq mi)
- Elevation: 194 m (636 ft)
- Population (2021-12-01): 1,494
  - Density: 78/km^{2} (200/sq mi)
- Time zone: EET/EEST (UTC+2/+3)
- Postal code: 737145
- Area code: +40 x32
- Vehicle reg.: IS
- Website: primariacomuneicostesti.ro

Costești is a commune in Iași County, Western Moldavia, Romania. It is composed of two villages, Costești and Giurgești. These belonged to Târgu Frumos town until 2004, when they were split off to form a separate commune.
