= Iulia Hasdeu =

Romanian poet

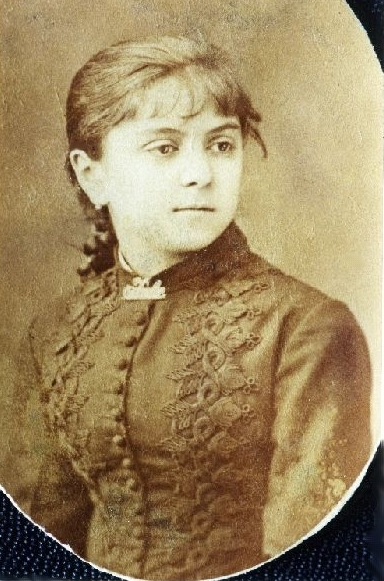
- Born: 14 November 1869; Bucharest, Romania
- Died: 29 September 1888 (aged 18); Bucharest, Kingdom of Romania
- Resting place: Bellu Cemetery, Bucharest; 44°24′13.61″N 26°05′56.95″E
- Education: National University of Music Bucharest; École des Hautes Études; Sorbonne University
- Occupation: Poet
- Father: Bogdan Petriceicu Hasdeu

Iulia Hasdeu (Romanian pronunciation: [ˈjuli.a haʃˈdew]; 14 November 1869 – 29 September 1888) was a Romanian poet, the daughter of writer and philologist Bogdan Petriceicu Hasdeu and his wife Iulia Faliciu. From a very young age, Hasdeu wrote poems and prose in both Romanian and French, taught herself foreign languages and studied piano and opera singing. She was the first Romanian woman to study at La Sorbonne University in Paris.

== Life ==
At the age of six she wrote her study of the life and work of Michael the Brave. Fluent in French, English, and German, she graduated from primary school at age eight, and at eleven she completed piano and classical singing at St. Sava Gymnasium and the Bucharest Conservatory of Music.

In 1881 her mother accompanied her to Paris, where she entered Sévigné College and passed the Baccalaureate exam. In 1886 Hasdeu enrolled at the Faculty of Letters and Philosophy at Sorbonne University and attended courses at the École des hautes études (School of Higher Studies) in Paris.

Hasdeu gave two lectures at the university on the logic of hypothesis and on the second book of Herodotus. She started writing a doctoral thesis with the theme centered on Romanian folk philosophy: logic, psychology, metaphysics, ethics, and theodicy.

While preparing her doctoral thesis, Hasdeu contracted tuberculosis in Paris. After undergoing treatments in France, Italy, and Switzerland, she returned to Bucharest. She died on 29 September 1888 and was buried at Bellu Cemetery. Affected by her death, Bogdan Petriceicu Hasdeu built her a temple in the family vault in his Câmpina mansion.

Her father dedicated the rest of his life to publishing her works and memories, such as: Bourgeons d'Avril, Fantésies et Rêves, Chevalerie, Confidences en Canevas et Théâtre, Légendes et Contes, works which were published in French and Romanian. In her memory, he also built the Iulia Hasdeu Castle in Câmpina with the "spiritual guidance of his daughter," with whom he supposedly communicated until the end of his life.

== Gallery ==
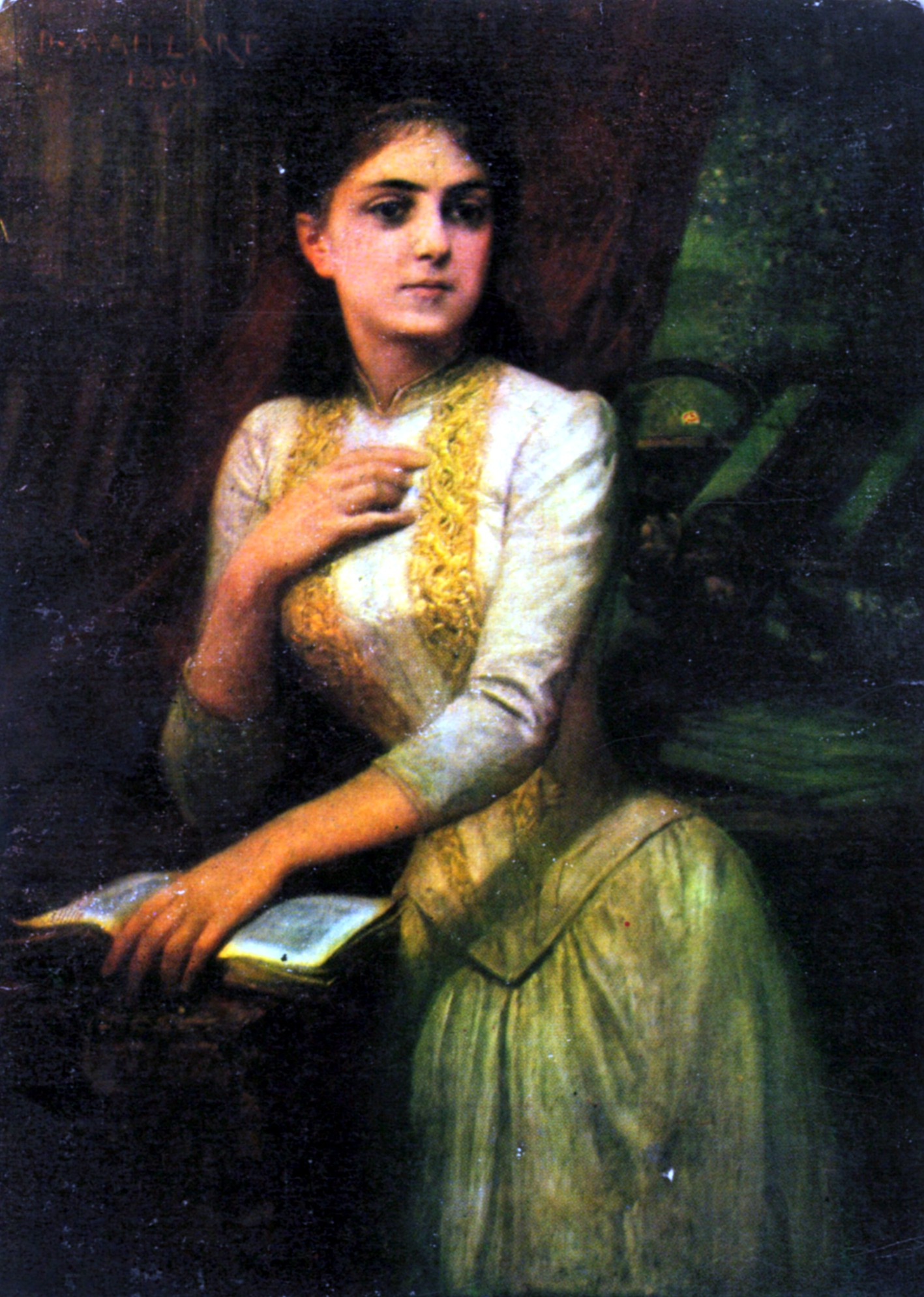
Portrait by
Diogène Maillart

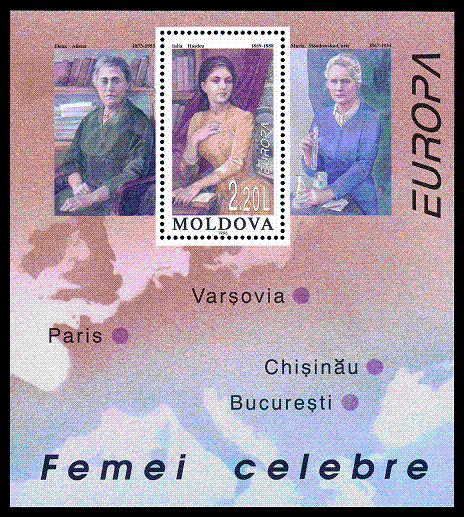
1996 stamp

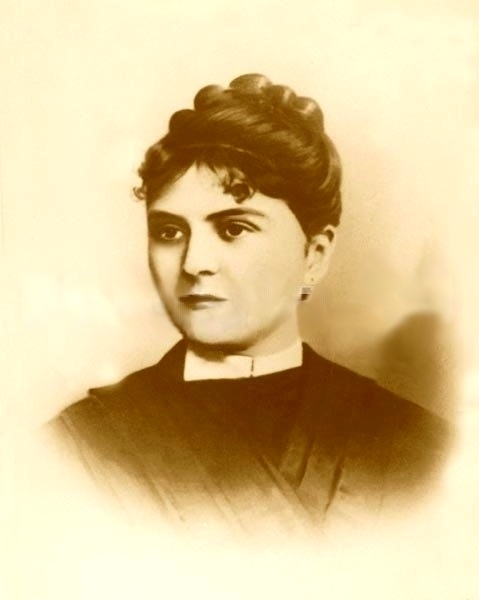
Photograph from the archives of Formula AS

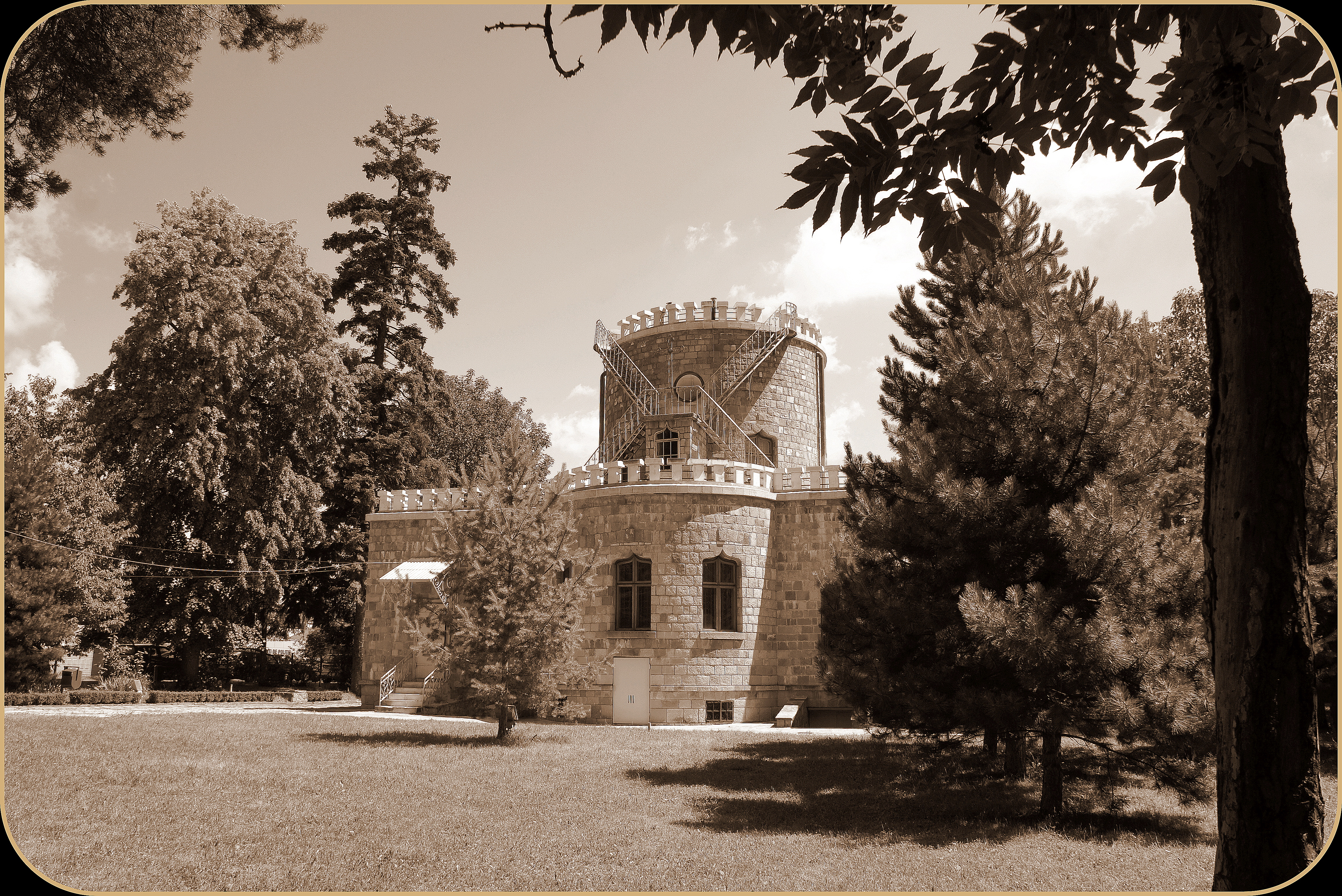
The small castle built in her memory

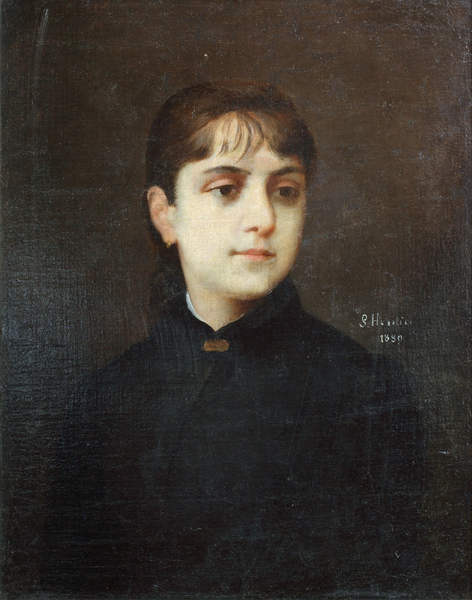
Portrait by
Sava Henția

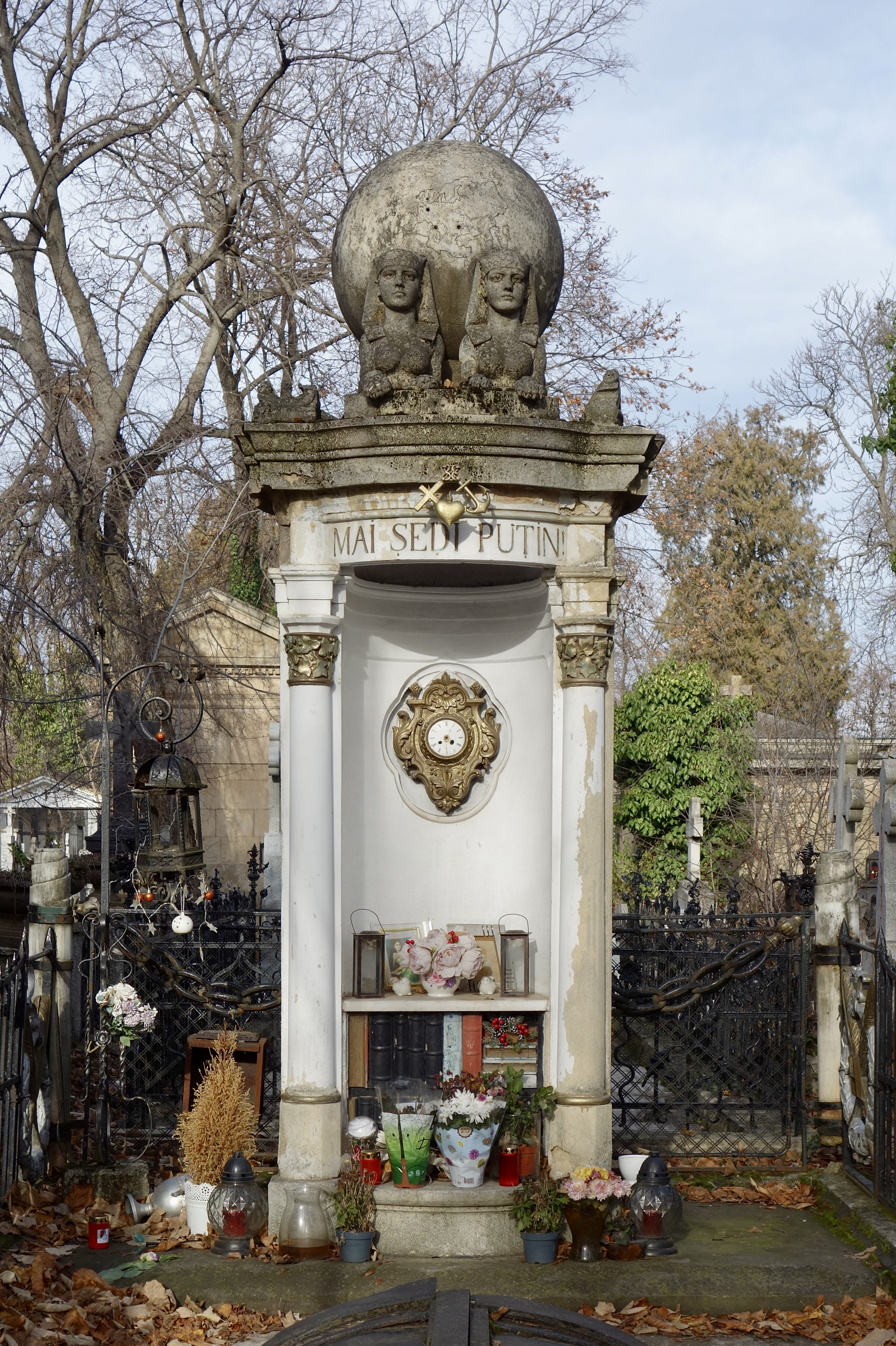
Grave at Bellu Cemetery
