= Bogdan Petriceicu Hasdeu =

Romanian writer and philologist (1838–1907)

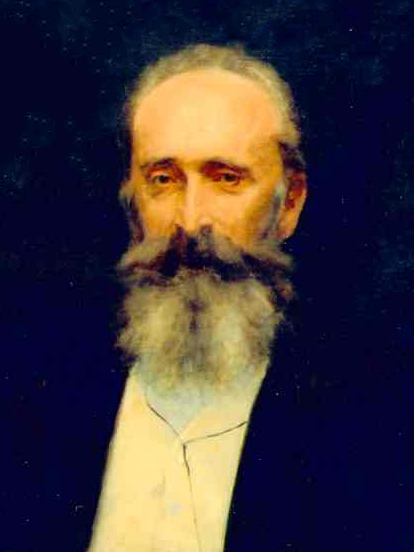
- Hasdeu by George Demetrescu Mirea (1887)
- Born: Tadeu Hâjdeu; 26 February 1838; Cristineștii, Bessarabia, Imperial Russia (now Kerstentsi, Ukraine)
- Died: 7 September 1907 (aged 69); Câmpina, Kingdom of Romania
- Resting place: Bellu Cemetery, Bucharest
- Education: University of Kharkiv
- Children: Iulia Hasdeu
- Father: Alexandru Hâjdeu
- Scientific career
- Fields: Philology
- Workplaces: National Archives of Romania; University of Bucharest

Bogdan Petriceicu Hasdeu (Romanian pronunciation: [boɡˈdan petriˈtʃejku haʃˈdew]; 26 February 1838 – 7 September [O.S. 25 August] 1907) was a Romanian writer and philologist who pioneered many branches of Romanian philology and history.

== Life ==
He was born Tadeu Hâjdeu in Cristineștii (now Kerstentsi in Chernivtsi Oblast, Ukraine), northern Bessarabia, at the time part of Imperial Russia. His father was the writer Alexandru Hâjdeu, a descendant of the Hâjdău family of Moldovan boyars, with noted Polish connections. Alexandru's mother was Jewish.

After studying law at the University of Kharkiv, he fought as a Russian hussar in the Crimean War. In 1858, he settled in Iași as a high school teacher and librarian. In 1865, Hasdeu published a monograph on Ioan Vodă the Terrible, renaming him for the first time cel Viteaz—"the Brave". The portrayal of this violent, short rule as a glorious moment (and of Ioan himself as a reformer) drew criticism from the Junimea society, a conflict which was to follow Hasdeu for the rest of his life. Still, Hasdeu's version of Ioan's character and his anti-boyar actions were to be reclaimed as a founding myth by Communist Romania.

In 1863, Hasdeu again moved his residence, from Iași to Bucharest; he began editing the satirical magazine Aghiuță, which ceased publication the following year.

=== Scientific works ===
In Romania, Hasdeu started work on the Arhiva historică a României (1865–1867), the first history work to use sources in Slavonic and Romanian. He also published the 1870 philological review Columna lui Traian, the best at the time in Romania. With the work Cuvente dân Batrâni (2 volumes, 1878–1881), he was the first to contribute to the history of apocryphal literature in Romania.

His Istoria critică a Românilor (1875), though incomplete, marks the beginning of critical investigation into the history of Romania. Hasdeu edited the ancient Psalter of Coresi of 1577 (Psaltirea lui Coresi, 1881).

His Etymologicum magnum Romaniae (1886) was the beginning of an encyclopaedic dictionary of the Romanian language, though he never covered letters after B. While the completed parts of the work do aim to be exhaustive, and are remarkably detailed, many of its entries reflect more of Hasdeu's own vision than historical facts (in one famous entry, he claims to be able to trace Basarab I's ancestry in a direct line to the Dacian rulers, with Dacia as a developed state that would have had, at times, dominated the Roman Empire—to the point where the single ruling family would have given Rome a large number of emperors).

Hasdeu got involved in the dispute over the Latin origin of the Romanian language. Being challenged by numerous arguments which pointed to the central position occupied by words of Slavic origin in the Romanian language, Hasdeu developed an influential verdict, deemed the theory of words' circulation. The conclusion he reached was that Slavic words were never as widely used as Latin ones, with usage giving the language its character.

In 1876, he was appointed head of the State Archives in Bucharest, and in 1878 professor of philology at the University of Bucharest. In 1877, Hasdeu was elected as a titular member of the Romanian Academy, and in 1883 he became a foreign member of the Russian Academy of Sciences.

=== Other activities ===
Hasdeu was a politician often at odds with the Romanian establishment. For example, he was placed under arrest for a nine-day interval after Captain Alexandru Candiano-Popescu's "Republic of Ploiești" conspiracy (1870). Although he had been a staunch defender of the deposed Alexandru Ioan Cuza, he eventually backed the movement against him (led by Mihail Kogălniceanu), and was not opposed to the new Domnitor (future King of Romania) Carol I.

However, Hasdeu was a Liberal Party activist (he was elected to Parliament on its list for two non-consecutive terms), and close to its most radical, republican wing—the one led by C. A. Rosetti. As the republican experiment coincided with worsened relations between Prime Minister Ion Brătianu and Carol, all Liberal Party members became suspect of involvement. Together with several Party leaders, Hasdeu was tried and acquitted.

== Last years and death ==
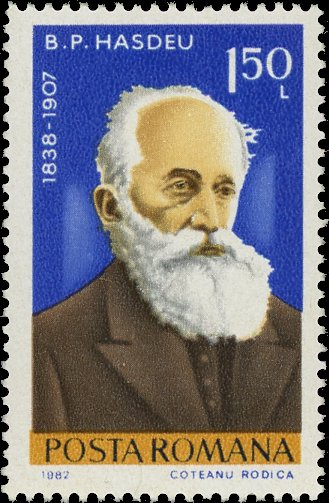
Hasdeu on a 1982 stamp of Romania

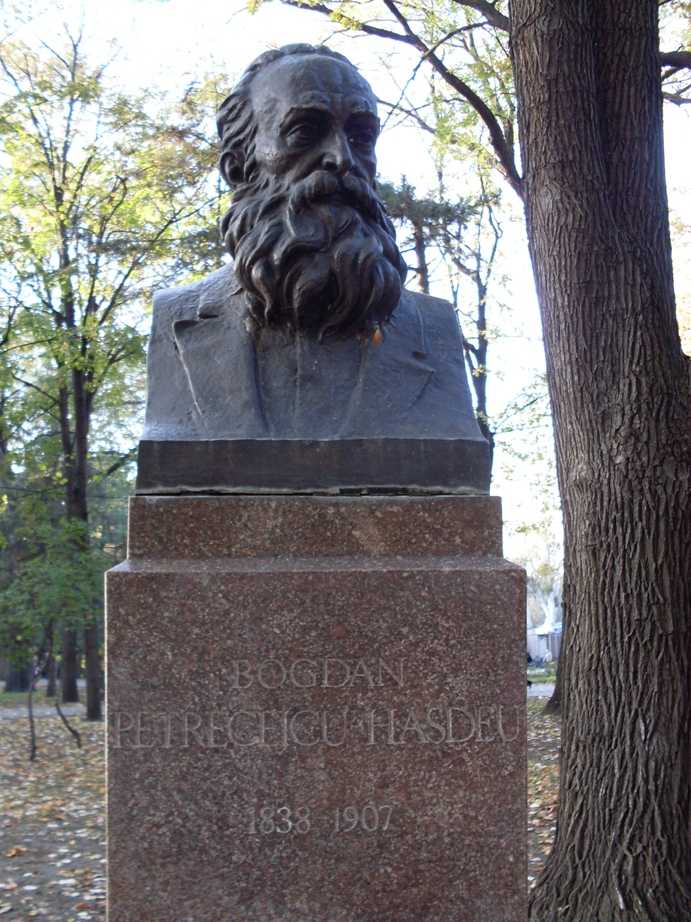
Bust of Hasdeu on Alley of Classics, Chișinău

After the death of his only child, his daughter Iulia, in 1888, he became a spiritualist and a firm adept of the spiritism. He retreated to a Câmpina mansion, and arranged it as a temple to his newly found beliefs and to his daughter. He died there and was buried in Bellu Cemetery, Bucharest.

His works include two dramas, Răsvan și Vidra (romanticizing the actions of an obscure 1590s Moldavian-Romani Voivode, Ștefan Răzvan), and Domnița Ruxandra. Between 1891 and 1892, he wrote Sic Cogito, a theoretical work of spiritism as a philosophy. In addition to his interest in science, Hasdeu was the author of many poems, usually short ones. The Romanian critic Mircea Eliade described him as a "genius of an amazing vastness".

== Name ==
Hasdeu is pronounced as if spelled with the Romanian version of ș (Hașdeu); Hasdeu never spelled it with any diacritic (most likely because the Romanian alphabet appeared and went through several major changes during his lifetime).

Although many times taken for a first surname, Petriceicu is in fact his second name. The confusion can be ascribed to the name's uniqueness, and to the misguided assumption that cu is the same as the extremely common suffix for Romanian family names. The name was chosen by the writer himself, and it reflected the Hasdeu family claim to have descended from 17th century Moldavian ruler Ștefan Petriceicu.

== See also ==
- Protochronism
