= Sinești, Iași =

Sinești
- Commune
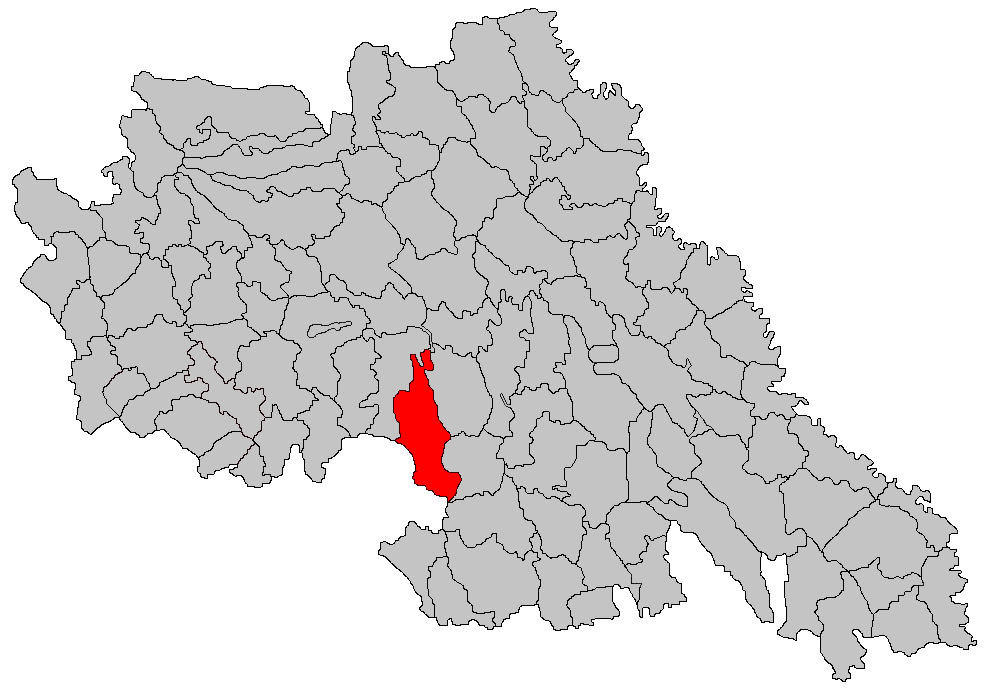
- Location in Iași County

- Location in Romania
- Coordinates: 47°07′N 27°11′E
- Country: Romania
- County: Iași
- Subdivisions: Sinești, Bocnița, Osoi, Stornești

Government
  - Mayor (2024–2028): Petru Holicov (PNL)
- Area: 28.11 km^{2} (10.85 sq mi)
- Elevation: 161 m (528 ft)
- Population (2021-12-01): 3,668
  - Density: 130/km^{2} (340/sq mi)
- Time zone: EET/EEST (UTC+2/+3)
- Postal code: 707450
- Area code: +40 x32
- Vehicle reg.: IS
- Website: www.primariasinesti.ro

Sinești is a commune in Iași County, Western Moldavia, Romania. It is composed of four villages: Bocnița, Osoi, Sinești and Stornești.

== Natives ==
- Rudi Prisăcaru
