= Podu Iloaiei =

- Town
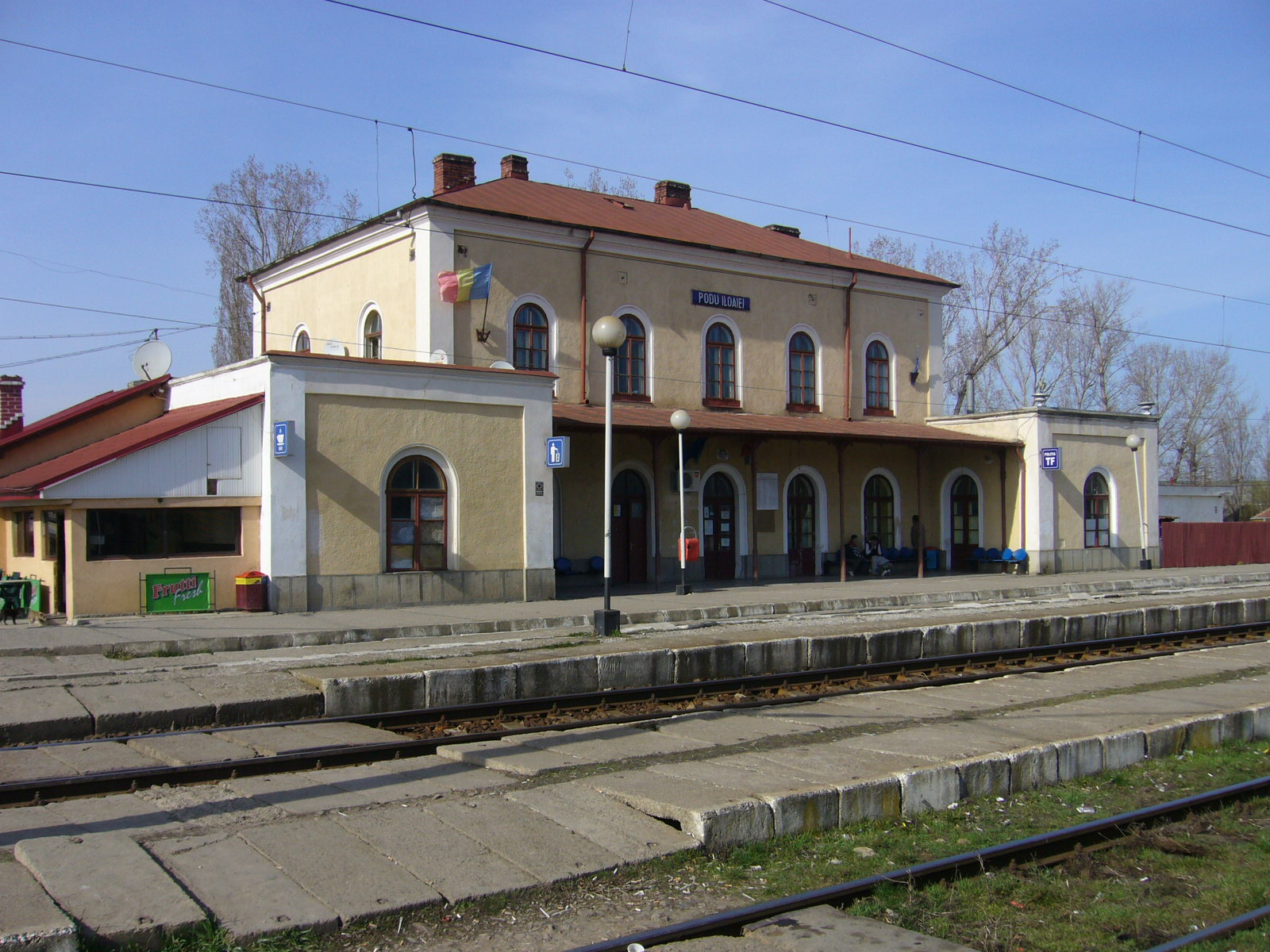
- Podu Iloaiei Railway Station

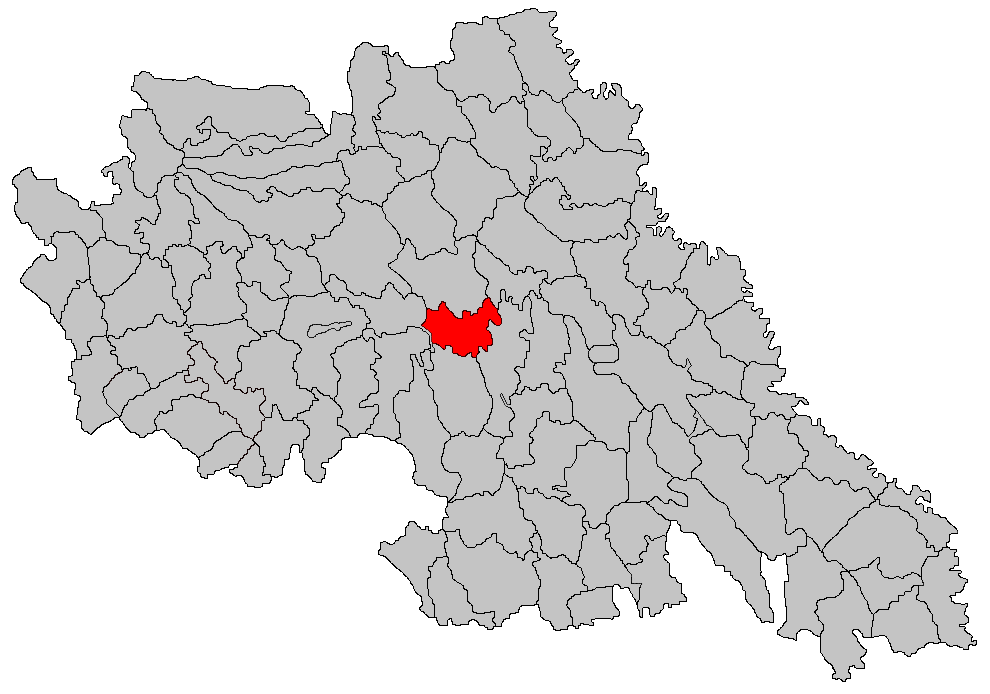
- Location in Iași County

- Location in Romania
- Coordinates: 47°13′N 27°16′E
- Country: Romania
- County: Iași

Government
  - Mayor (2024–2028): Ioan Alexa (PNL)
- Area: 48.59 km^{2} (18.76 sq mi)
- Elevation: 83 m (272 ft)
- Population (2021-12-01): 8,992
  - Density: 185.1/km^{2} (479.3/sq mi)
- Time zone: UTC+02:00 (EET)
  - Summer (DST): UTC+03:00 (EEST)
- Postal code: 707365
- Area code: +(40) 232
- Vehicle reg.: IS
- Website: poduiloaiei.ro

Podu Iloaiei is a town in Iași County, Western Moldavia, Romania. It has 8,992 inhabitants as of 2021, and was declared a town in 2005. Four villages are administered by the town: Budăi, Cosițeni, Holm, and Scobâlțeni.

== Geography ==
The town lies on Moldavian Plain, on the banks of the Bahlui River. It is located in the central part of the county, 27 km (17 mi) west of the county seat, Iași.

The railway station serves the CFR Line 607, which runs from Iași to Hârlău.

== Population ==
Historical population
Year	Pop.	±%
2002	9,739	—
2011	9,573	−1.7%
2021	8,992	−6.1%
Source: Census data

== Natives ==
- Petru Aruștei (1939–1984), poet and painter
- Sabetai Unguru (1931–2024), Israeli historian of mathematics and science

== See also ==
- Battle of Podu Iloaiei
