= Bălțați =

- Commune
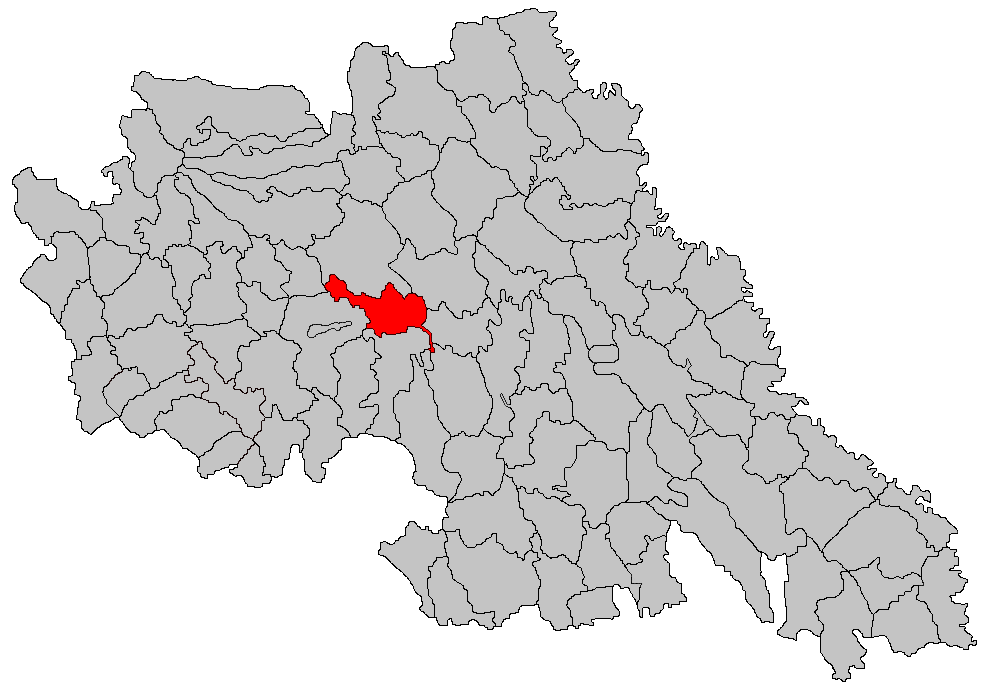
- Location in Iași County

- Location in Romania
- Coordinates: 47°13′N 27°09′E
- Country: Romania
- County: Iași
- Subdivisions: Bălțați, Cotârgaci, Filiași, Mădârjești, Podișu, Sârca, Valea Oilor

Government
  - Mayor (2024–2028): Vasile Aștefanei (PSD)
- Area: 45.18 km^{2} (17.44 sq mi)
- Elevation: 110 m (360 ft)
- Population (2021-12-01): 4,778
  - Density: 110/km^{2} (270/sq mi)
- Time zone: EET/EEST (UTC+2/+3)
- Postal code: 707025
- Area code: +40 x32
- Vehicle reg.: IS
- Website: primariabaltati.ro

Bălțați is a commune in Iași County, Western Moldavia, Romania. It is composed of seven villages: Bălțați, Cotârgaci, Filiași, Mădârjești, Podișu, Sârca and Valea Oilor.
