= Lungani =

- Commune
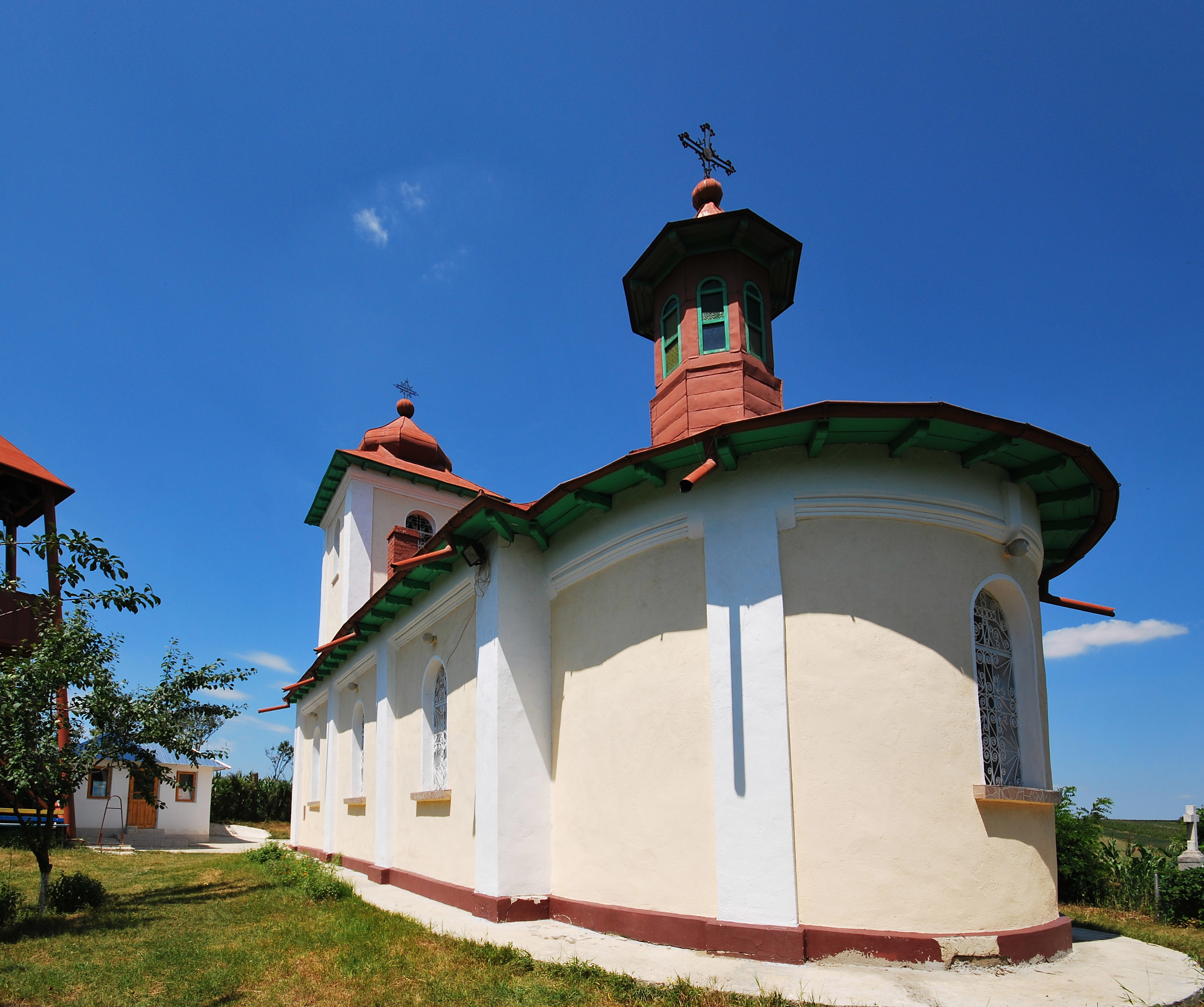
- St. Nicholas Church in Lungani

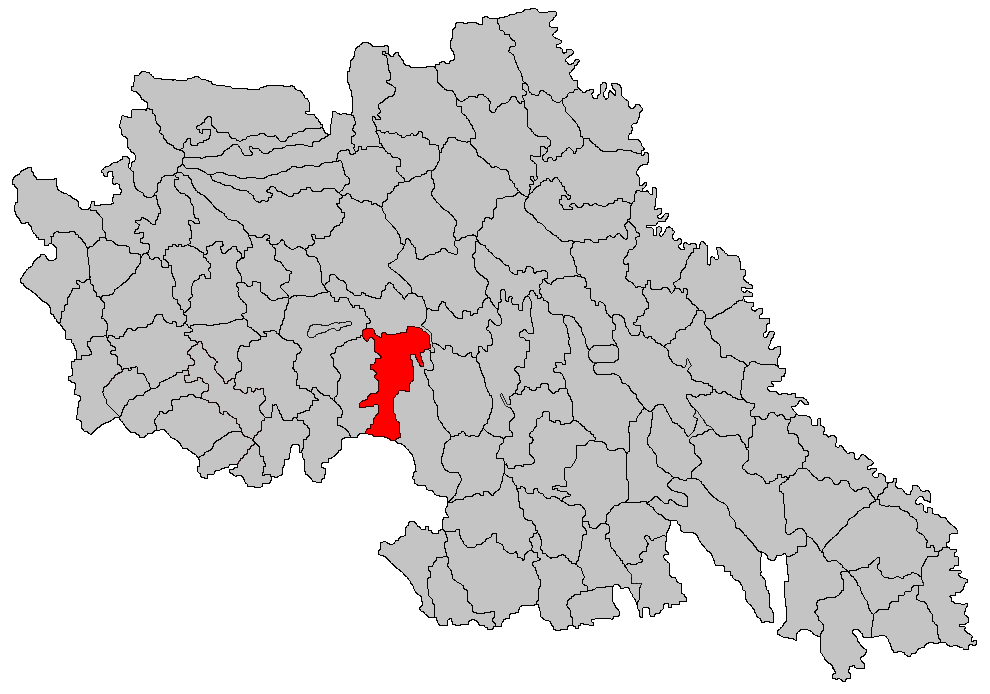
- Location in Iași County

- Location in Romania
- Coordinates: 47°12′N 27°9′E
- Country: Romania
- County: Iași

Government
  - Mayor (2020–2024): Ioan Corobuță (PSD)
- Area: 63.37 km^{2} (24.47 sq mi)
- Elevation: 86 m (282 ft)
- Population (2021-12-01): 6,178
  - Density: 97.49/km^{2} (252.5/sq mi)
- Time zone: UTC+02:00 (EET)
  - Summer (DST): UTC+03:00 (EEST)
- Postal code: 707285
- Area code: +(40) 232
- Vehicle reg.: IS
- Website: comunalungani.ro

Lungani is a commune in Iași County, Western Moldavia, Romania. It is composed of four villages: Crucea, Goești, Lungani, and Zmeu.
