= Târgu Frumos =

- Town
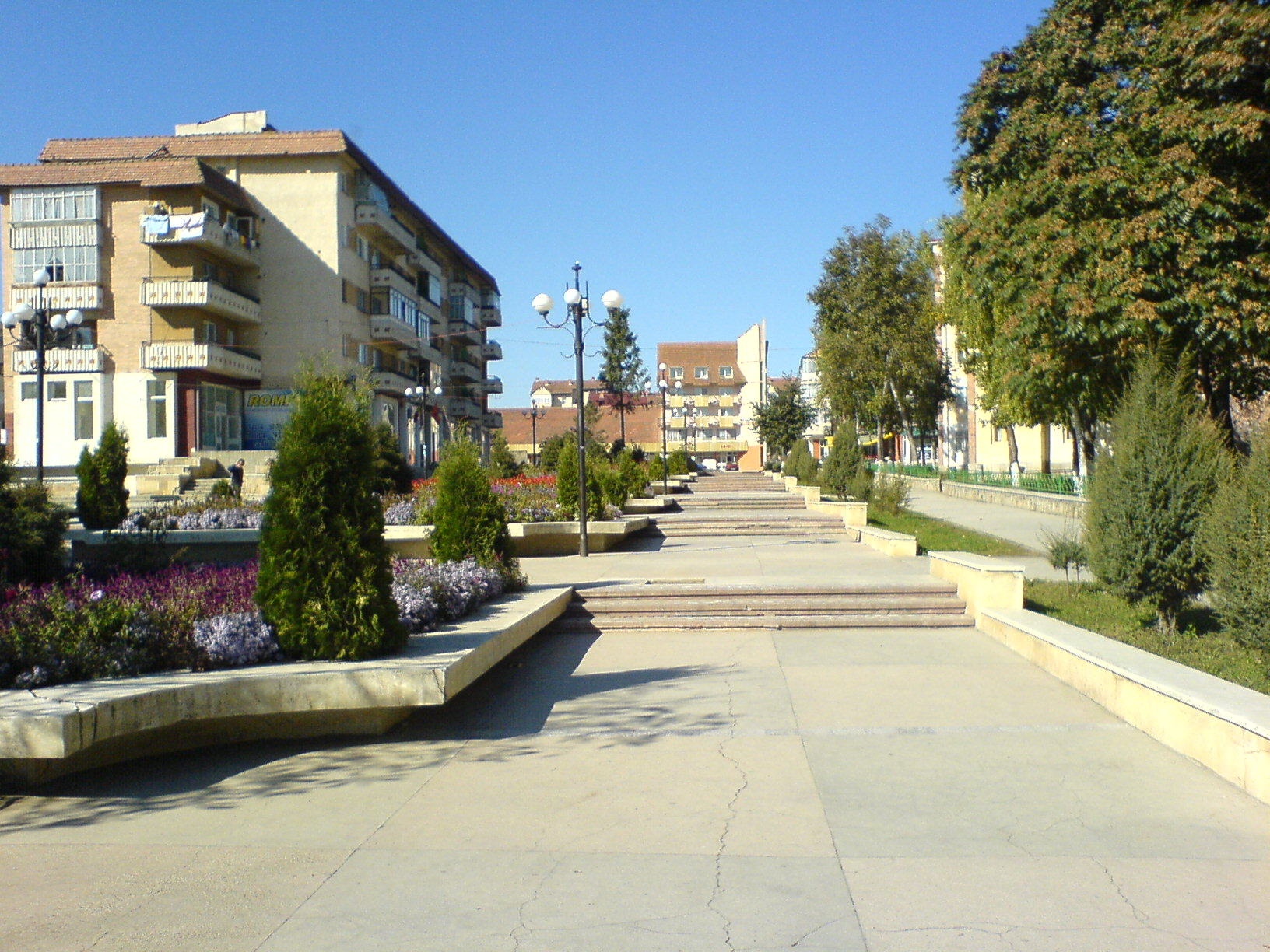
- Central Esplanade

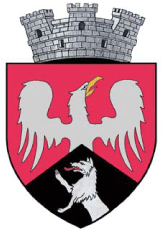
- Coat of arms

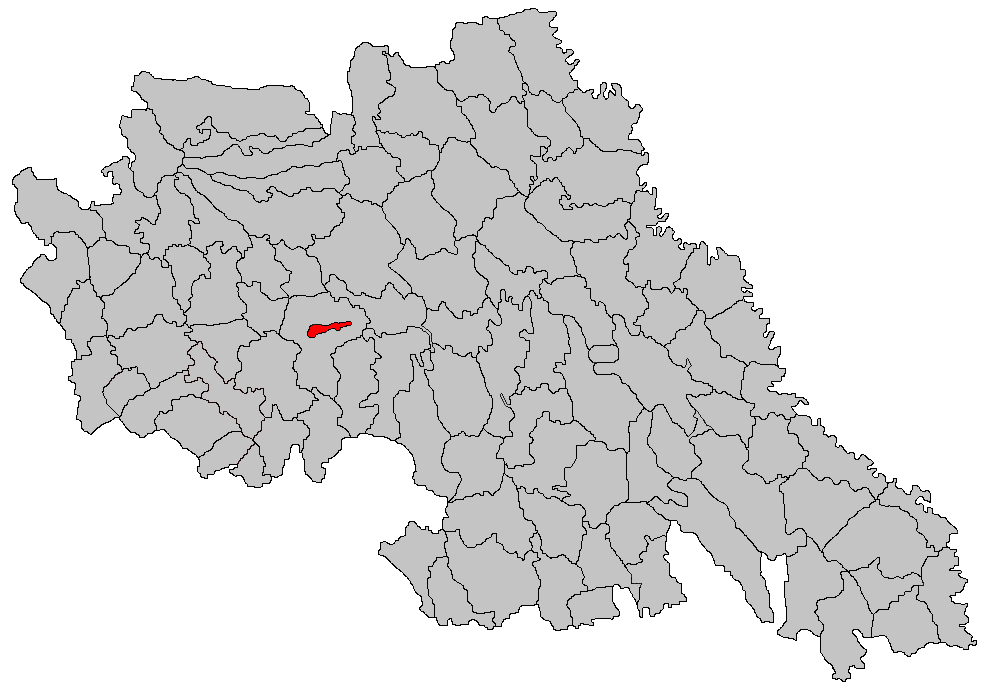
- Location in Iași County

- Location in Romania
- Coordinates: 47°12′35″N 27°00′47″E
- Country: Romania
- County: Iași

Government
  - Mayor (2024–2028): Neculai Zugravu (PNL)
- Area: 15.13 km^{2} (5.84 sq mi)
- Elevation: 125 m (410 ft)
- Population (2021-12-01): 9,597
  - Density: 634.3/km^{2} (1,643/sq mi)
- Time zone: UTC+02:00 (EET)
  - Summer (DST): UTC+03:00 (EEST)
- Postal code: 705300
- Area code: +(40) 02 32
- Vehicle reg.: IS
- Website: primariatgfrumos.ro

Târgu Frumos (also spelled Tîrgu Frumos, sometimes Târgul / Tîrgul Frumos, Romanian pronunciation: [ˌtɨrɡu fruˈmos]; Hungarian: Szépvásár; German: Schöner Markt) is a town in Iași County, Western Moldavia, Romania. Eleven villages were administered by the town until 2004, when they were split off to form Balș, Costești, and Ion Neculce communes.

== History ==
During World War II, in March and May 1944, this area was the scene of the two Battles of Târgu Frumos, part of the First Jassy-Kishinev Offensive.

According to the 1930 census, 1,608 Jews lived in Târgu Frumos. In the fall of 1940, all Jewish men, from 18 to 50 years old, were subjected to forced labor. Many were sent to the work camp Tudoreni-Rechita, situated in Botoșani County, while others were deported to Transnistria. Târgu Frumos was also a 24-hour stop of the "Death train" going to the Călărași camp. On July 1, 1941, when the train arrived in Târgu Frumos, 654 bodies were removed from the train and transported to the local Jewish cemetery where they were buried.

== Demographics ==
Historical population
Year	Pop.	±%
1912	4,986	—
1930	4,932	−1.1%
1948	4,665	−5.4%
1977	7,165	+53.6%
1992	13,875	+93.6%
2002	13,763	−0.8%
2011	10,475	−23.9%
2021	9,597	−8.4%
Source: Census data

As of 2011, 10,475 people inhabited the town, 81.6% Romanians, 9.14% Lipovans, and 9.08% Roma. At the 2021 census, Târgu Frumos had a population of 9,597; of those, 70.92% were Romanians, 4.77% Roma, and 2.72% Lipovans.

== Natives ==
- Gabriela Crețu (born 1965), politician
- Garabet Ibrăileanu (1871 – 1936), literary critic
- Dumitru Theodor Neculuță (1859 – 1904), poet and socialist activist
- Belu Zilber (1901 – 1978), communist activist

== Gallery ==
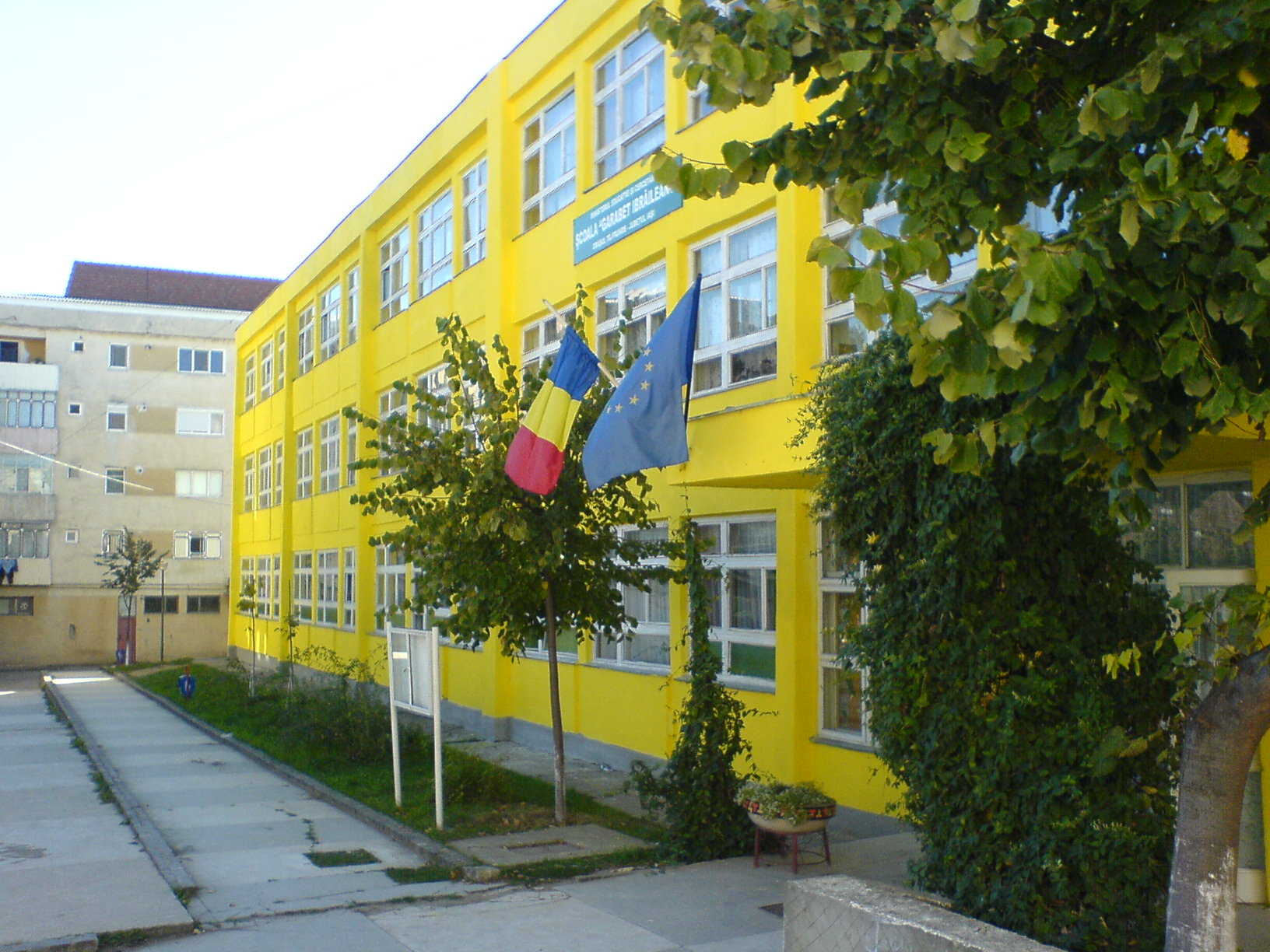
Garabet Ibrăileanu Primary School

Ion Creangă Primary School

Roman Catholic Church

== See also ==
- Battle of Târgu Frumos
