= Sirețel =

- Commune
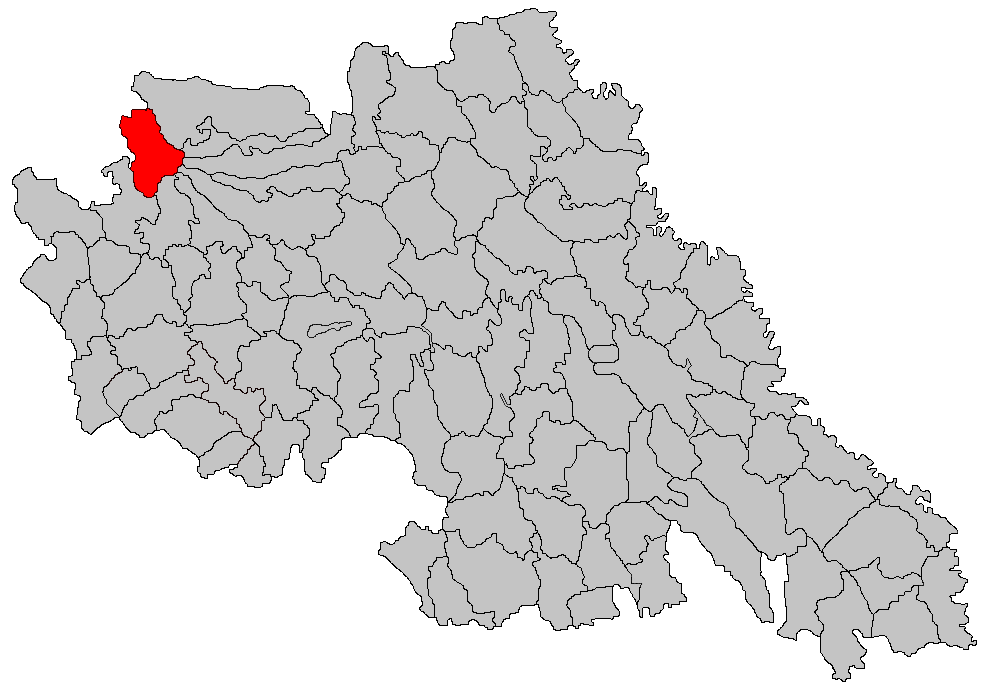
- Location in Iași County

- Location in Romania
- Coordinates: 47°23′02″N 26°43′10″E
- Country: Romania
- County: Iași
- Established: ca. 1480

Government
  - Mayor (2020–2024): Gelu Șpaiuc (PSD)
- Population (2021-12-01): 3,726
- Time zone: UTC+02:00 (EET)
  - Summer (DST): UTC+03:00 (EEST)
- Postal code: 707455
- Area code: +40 x32
- Vehicle reg.: IS
- Website: www.siretel.ro

Sirețel is a commune in Iași County, Western Moldavia, Romania. It is composed of five villages: Berezlogi, Humosu, Satu Nou, Slobozia and Sirețel.

== Geography ==
The commune lies at the northwestern extremity of Iași County, at the border with the counties of Suceava and Botoșani on the upper course of the Sirețel River. The county highway of DJ281 runs through the commune, connecting it to Lespezi in the southwest and Scobinți, Ceplenița, Cotnari, Belcești, Erbiceni and Podu Iloaiei in the east, where the road DN28 ends.

It is situated in the Suceava Plateau subregion of the Moldavian Plateau, more specifically in the Dealu Mare of Hârlău area.

The river which it is named after is a tributary of the Siret River.

== Demographics ==
Sirețel church

Ethnic composition of Sirețel Commune
1. Romanians (90.9%)
2. Other (9.07%)
Religious composition of Sirețel Commune
1. Orthodox Christianity (90.6%)
2. Others (0.11%)
3. Unknown (9.26%)

According to the 2021 Census, the Commune has a population of 3,726 people, less people than the 2011 Census recorded, there having been 4,130 people. Ethnically, the majority of the population is Romanian, and religiously, the majority of the population is Orthodox Christian.

== Politics and administration ==
Sirețel is administered by a mayor and a local council made up of 13 councilors. The mayor, Gelu Șpaiuc, of the Social Democratic Party (PSD) has been in office since October 2020. Since the local elections in 2024, the structure of the council has been the following:

Party	Councilors
PSD	10
PNL	2
AUR	1

== History ==
=== Prehistory ===
Archeological discoveries have shown settlement of the region as far back as the Upper Paleolithic period. Likewise, there are settlements from cultures such as the La Tène and Cucuteni.

The area would be inhabited, later on, by the Dacians, and, following the wars with Rome and annexation of Dacia, it would continue to be inhabited by the Free Dacians.

=== Medieval History ===
The earliest mention of the village of Sirețel comes from a document issued on the 12th of June 1459. In this document, a nobleman from Sirețel, Ivașco, comes before Stephen the Great, having a dispute with his nephew over three other villages. It is agreed that Ivașco hand over the villages and that no one from his family should ever attempt to reclaim them.

In 1499, Ivașco's son, Lupșe, willingly sells Giulești (today part of Secuieni commune in Neamț) to Stephen the Great.

=== 17th-century history ===
In this period, Sirețel begins to find itself in a period of fragmentation. Sometime after the 15th century, Simeon Stroici gains the estate, likely inheriting it from his father, giving half of the village and a small property over to Ionașcu Ghenghea in 1619, who was married to Anghelina, Simeon's niece and daughter of Luca Stroici. In 1635, after Ghenghea's bridegroom's death, Ion Colpan, Ghenghea's grandchild, is left with many of his father's debts and asks his grandfather to pay them off. Ionașcu does so by borrowing money from a merchant, but dies in the meanwhile, and so, Ionașcu's sons, along with one of their brothers-in-law, sell parts of village to pay off the loan. Later, in 1656, Candachia, Anghelina's daughter, sells a fourth of Sirețel to her brother-in-law, Grigori. In 1672, Frangole Stolnic gives a sixth of the village to his nephews and, three years later, Dumitrașcu Prăjăscu gives half of Sirețel and Stolniceni to the same Grigori from 1656, who also happen to be the bridegroom of Ursu of Sirețel.

Other landowners of this period worth mentioning are Iordache Mălaiu, Frangole Bivel, Toderașcu and Zosen Basotă.

=== Modern History ===
==== Early Modern History ====
In a charter by Matei Ghica from 1754, Ursu's son, Peniță, is mentioned as one of the landowners who will cede land to Dancu Monastery. Different toponyms of the Sirețel region are also given, such as Podul de Lut (The Clay Bridge), Dealul Cetății (The Fortress Hill), Fundul Purcărețelor (The Coop's Bottom), Făgețel (Little Beech), Mestecăniș (Birch Forest), Poiana Strahotin (Strahotin Meadow), Turbata (The Wild).

=== Contemporary History ===
The commune appeared in the mid 20th century, its villages formerly belonging to the communes Lespezi and Stolniceni-Ghițescu of Suceava County, and then, of Baia County. In 1950, it belonged to the Pașcani Raion, going over to Iași County in 1968.

== Historic monuments ==
There are three places in Sirețel that appear on the list of historic monuments in Iași County, all being archeological sites: the "Bulgărie" site, which includes the medieval village center and a necropolis of that period (14th-15th centuries and 16th-17th centuries); the "Sărături" site, which includes settlements from the 3rd-2nd centuries BC (La Tène period) and from the 8th-9th centuries (Early Middle Ages); and the "Șanțuri" site, which includes settlements from the Upper Paleolithic and Chalcolithic, as well as a Geto-Dacian fortress.
