= Hoisești =

Hoisești may refer to several places in Romania:

- Hoisești, a village in Dumești Commune, Iași County
- Hoisești, a village in Mărgineni Commune, Neamț County
- Hoisești (river), a tributary of the Bahlui in Iași County
