= Vămășoaia =

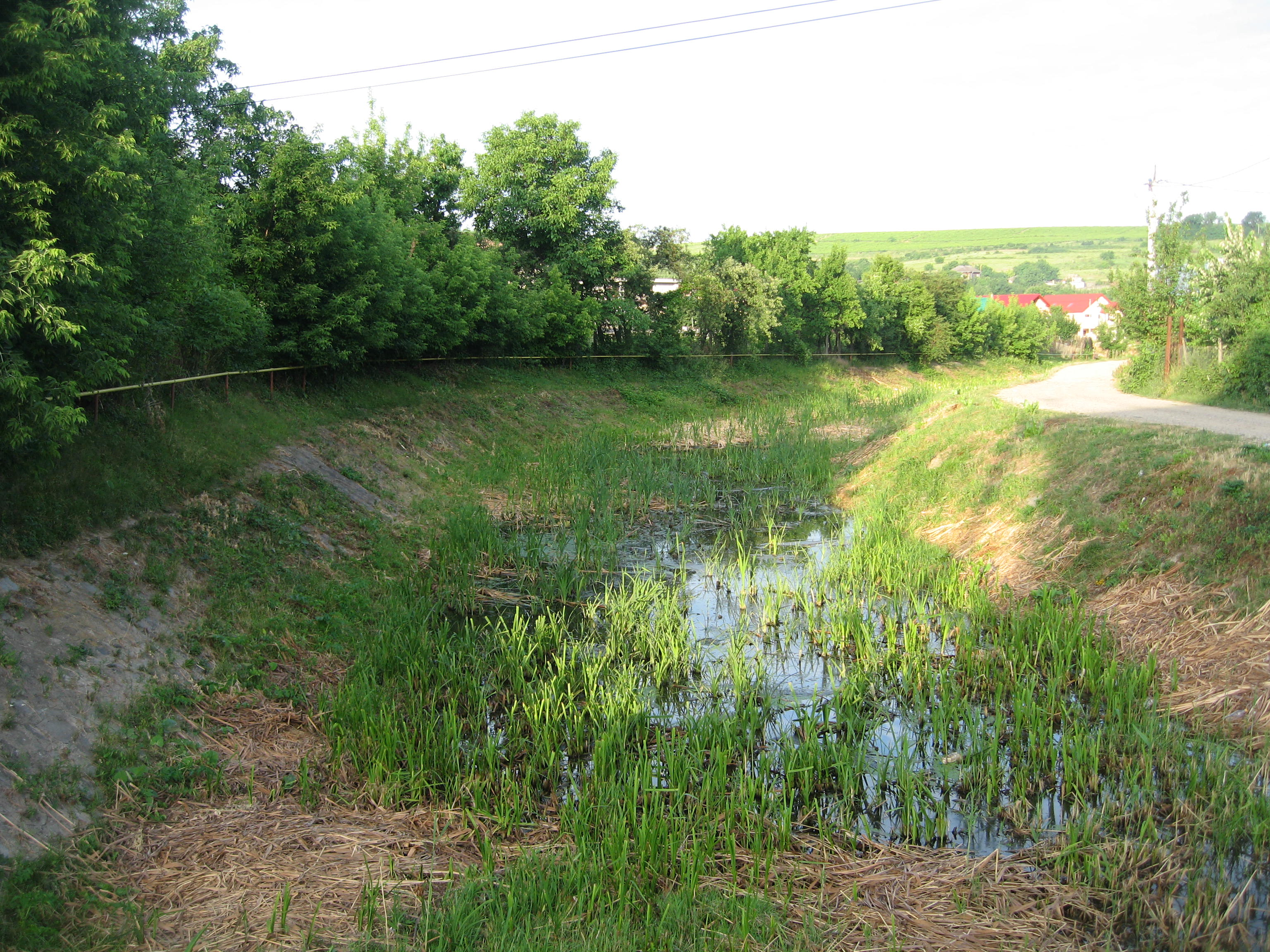

- Location within Romania

Location
- Country: Romania
- Counties: Iași County
- Villages: Vlădiceni

Physical characteristics
- Mouth: Bahlui
  - coordinates: 47.1451°N 27.6795°E
- Length: 12 km (7.5 mi)
- Basin size: 35 km^{2} (14 sq mi)

Basin features
- Progression: Bahlui→ Jijia→ Prut→ Danube→ Black Sea
- River code: XIII.1.15.32.23a

The Vămășoaia is a right tributary of the river Bahlui in eastern Romania. It flows into the Bahlui in Holboca. Its length is 12 km (7.5 mi) and its basin size is 35 km^{2} (14 sq mi).
