= Buhalnița =

Buhalnița may refer to several places in Romania:

- Buhalnița, a village in Ceplenița Commune, Iași County
- Buhalnița, a village in Hangu Commune, Neamț County
- Buhalnița (Bahlui), a tributary of the Bahlui in Iași County
- Buhalnița, a tributary of the river Bistrița in Neamț County
