= Merișoru =

Merișoru may refer to several villages in Romania:

- Merișoru, a village in Vârfuri Commune, Dâmbovița County
- Merișoru, a village in Papiu Ilarian Commune, Mureș County
- Merișoru de Munte (Merisor), a village in Cerbăl Commune, Hunedoara County

== See also ==
- Măru (disambiguation)
- Merești (disambiguation)
- Merișor (disambiguation)
- Merișani (disambiguation)
