= Bârlești =

Bârlești may refer to several villages in Romania:

- Bârlești, a village in Bistra Commune, Alba County
- Bârleștiand Bârleşti-Cătun, villages in Mogoș Commune, Alba County
- Bârlești, a village in Scărişoara Commune, Alba County
- Bârlești, a village in Erbiceni Commune, Iaşi County
