= Ulmetu =

Ulmetu may refer to several villages in Romania:

- Ulmetu, a village in Vârfuri Commune, Dâmbovița County
- Ulmetu, a village in Copăceni Commune, Vâlcea County
