= Valeriu Arteni =

Romanian diplomat (1951–2022)

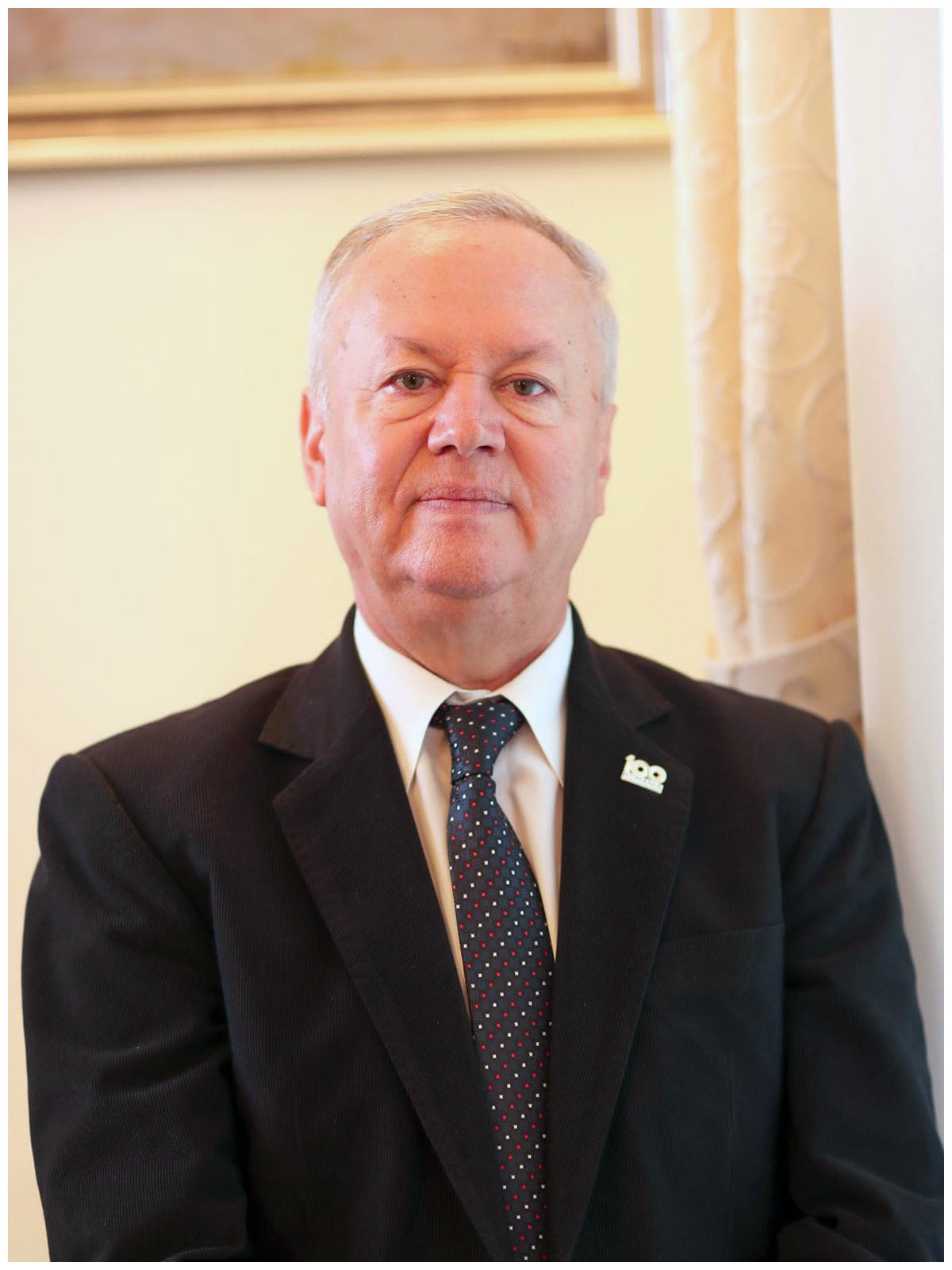
- Portrait of Ambassador Valeriu Arteni (1951–2022)

Ambassador of Romania to Vietnam
- In office 1994–1999

Ambassador of Romania to South Korea
- In office 2003–2007

Chargé d'Affaires of Romania to Vietnam
- In office 2012–2019

Personal details
- Born: 21 September 1951 Mărgineni, Neamț County, Romania
- Died: 18 January 2022 (aged 70) Bucharest, Romania
- Education: Vietnam National University, Hanoi
- Occupation: Diplomat
- Awards: Honorary Citizen of Hanoi (2019)

Valeriu Arteni (21 September 1951 – 18 January 2022) was a Romanian diplomat. He was the first foreign national to be awarded the title of Honorary Citizen of Hanoi for his significant contributions to strengthening diplomatic relations and cultural exchange between Vietnam and Romania.

== Early life and education ==
Valeriu Arteni was born in Mărgineni, Neamț County. He attended the "Calistrat Hogaș" High School in Piatra Neamț, graduating in 1970.

In 1971, Arteni was among the first Romanian students sent to Vietnam for study under a cultural exchange agreement. He studied Vietnamese Language and Literature at the Vietnam National University, Hanoi. During the Vietnam War (1971–1972), he and his fellow students evacuated to the countryside in Hà Bắc province. He graduated in 1976 and was fluent in the Vietnamese language.

== Diplomatic career ==
Arteni joined the Ministry of Foreign Affairs of Romania in 1977. His diplomatic career was closely associated with Asia:

- 1977–1982: Served as an Attaché at the Romanian Embassy in Hanoi.
- 1994–1999: Ambassador Extraordinary and Plenipotentiary of Romania to Vietnam.
- 1999–2003: Deputy Director and later Director of the Protocol Department at the Ministry of Foreign Affairs.
- 2003–2007: Ambassador Extraordinary and Plenipotentiary of Romania to South Korea.
- 2012–2019: Returned to Vietnam as Ambassador and Chargé d'Affaires, also accredited to Cambodia.

During his final term, he supported Vietnam in the negotiations for the European Union–Vietnam Free Trade Agreement (EVFTA). He also promoted educational programs connecting Vietnamese students with technical universities in Romania.

== Death ==
Valeriu Arteni died on 18 January 2022, at Elias Hospital in Bucharest, due to complications from COVID-19.
