= Valea Locii =

Valea Locii Valea Locei
- Location within Romania

Location
- Country: Romania
- Counties: Iași County
- Villages: Vocotești, Ciurbești

Physical characteristics
- Mouth: Nicolina
  - coordinates: 47.0935°N 27.5598°E
- Length: 12 km (7.5 mi)
- Basin size: 85 km^{2} (33 sq mi)

Basin features
- Progression: Nicolina→ Bahlui→ Jijia→ Prut→ Danube→ Black Sea
- Tributaries
  - right: Frumoasa
- River code: XIII.1.15.32.20.1

The Valea Locii (also: Valea Locei) is a left tributary of the river Nicolina in Romania. It flows into the Nicolina in Lunca Cetățuii. Its length is 12 km (7.5 mi) and its basin size is 85 km^{2} (33 sq mi). The Bârca and Ciurbești dams are located on this river.
