= Mărgineni =

Mărgineni may refer to one of several places in Romania:

- Mărgineni, Bacău, a commune in Bacău County
- Mărgineni, Neamț, a commune in Neamţ County
- Mărgineni, a village in Săliştea Commune, Alba County
- Mărgineni, a village in Hârseni Commune, Braşov County
- Mărgineni, a village in Valea Mare Commune, Vâlcea County
