= Săuzeni =

- Location within Romania

Location
- Country: Romania
- Counties: Iași County
- Villages: Păușești, Dumești, Cogeasca

Physical characteristics
- Mouth: Voinești
  - coordinates: 47.1663°N 27.4011°E
- Length: 30 km (19 mi)
- Basin size: 75 km^{2} (29 sq mi)

Basin features
- Progression: Voinești→ Bahlui→ Jijia→ Prut→ Danube→ Black Sea
- Tributaries
  - left: Durduc
- River code: XIII.1.15.32.15.2

The Săuzeni is a left tributary of the river Voinești in Romania. It flows into the Voinești in Cogeasca. Its length is 30 km (19 mi) and its basin size is 75 km^{2} (29 sq mi). Lakes Dumești I and Păușești, used mainly for fish farming are located on this river.
