= Durușca =

River in Romania

- Location within Romania

Location
- Country: Romania
- Counties: Iași County
- Villages: Erbiceni

Physical characteristics
- Mouth: Bahlui
  - coordinates: 47.2420°N 27.2584°E
- Length: 9 km (5.6 mi)
- Basin size: 30 km^{2} (12 sq mi)

Basin features
- Progression: Bahlui→ Jijia→ Prut→ Danube→ Black Sea
- River code: XIII.1.15.32.10

The Durușca is a left tributary of the river Bahlui in Romania. It flows into the Bahlui in Sprânceana. Its length is 9 km (5.6 mi) and its basin size is 30 km^{2} (12 sq mi).
