= Poiana Mărului (disambiguation) =

Poiana Mărului may refer to several places in Romania:

- Poiana Mărului, a commune in Brașov County
- Poiana Mărului, a village in Zăvoi Commune, Caraș-Severin County
- Poiana Mărului, a village in Ceplenița Commune, Iași County
- Poiana Mărului, a village in Mălini Commune, Suceava County
- Poiana Mărului Monastery in Bisoca Commune, Buzău County

== See also ==
- Măru (disambiguation)
