= Sirețel (river) =

- Location within Romania

Location
- Country: Romania
- Counties: Iași County
- Villages: Humosu, Satu Nou, Sirețel

Physical characteristics
- Mouth: Siret
  - location: near Dumbrava
  - coordinates: 47.3433°N 26.7092°E
- Length: 21 km (13 mi)
- Basin size: 75 km^{2} (29 sq mi)

Basin features
- Progression: Siret→ Danube→ Black Sea
- Tributaries
  - right: Valea Mare
- River code: XII.1.25

The Sirețel is a left tributary of the river Siret in Romania. It flows into the Siret near Dumbrava. The Sirețel is 21 km (13 mi) long and its basin size is 75 km^{2} (29 sq mi).
