= Chirița =

- Location within Romania

Location
- Country: Romania
- Counties: Iași County
- Villages: Rediu Aldei

Physical characteristics
- Mouth: Bahlui
  - location: Dancu
  - coordinates: 47.1463°N 27.6668°E
- Length: 15 km (9.3 mi)
- Basin size: 39 km^{2} (15 sq mi)

Basin features
- Progression: Bahlui→ Jijia→ Prut→ Danube→ Black Sea
- River code: XIII.1.15.32.23

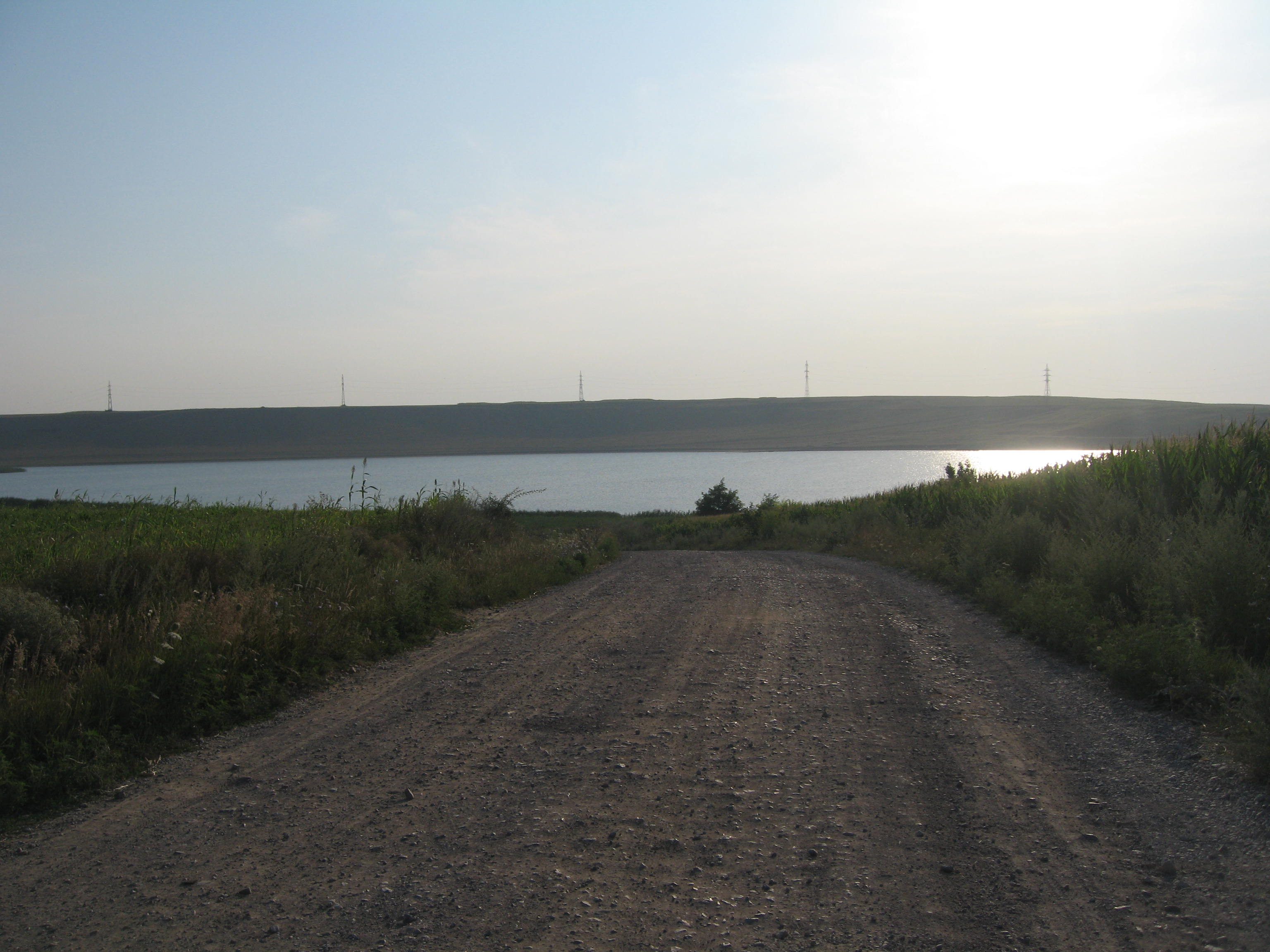

The Chirița is a left tributary of the river Bahlui in eastern Romania. It flows into the Bahlui in Dancu. Its length is 15 km (9.3 mi) and its basin size is 39 km^{2} (15 sq mi).
