= Gălășești =

Gălăşeşti may refer to several villages in Romania:

- Gălăşeşti, a village in Budeasa Commune, Argeș County
- Gălăşeşti, a village in Suseni Commune, Argeș County
