= Popricani =

- Commune
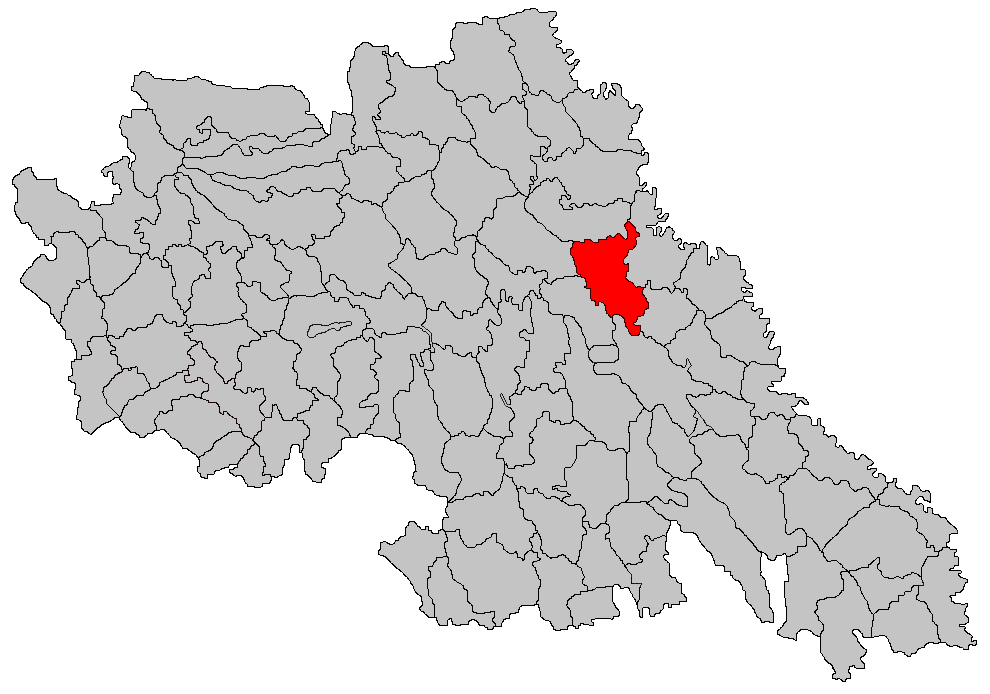
- Location in Iași County

- Location in Romania
- Coordinates: 47°18′N 27°31′E
- Country: Romania
- County: Iași

Government
  - Mayor (2020–2024): Ion Tănasă (PNL)
- Area: 69.62 km^{2} (26.88 sq mi)
- Elevation: 156 m (512 ft)
- Population (2021-12-01): 7,236
  - Density: 100/km^{2} (270/sq mi)
- Time zone: EET/EEST (UTC+2/+3)
- Postal code: 707380
- Area code: +(40) 232
- Vehicle reg.: IS
- Website: primariapopricani.ro

Popricani is a commune in Iași County, Western Moldavia, Romania, part of the Iași metropolitan area. It is composed of nine villages: Cârlig, Cotu Morii, Cuza Vodă, Moimești, Popricani, Rediu Mitropoliei, Țipilești, Vânători, and Vulturi.

The commune is located in the east-central part of the county, 16.5 km (10.3 mi) north of the county seat, Iași. It is crossed by the national road DN24C, which starts in Iași and goes up along the Prut River valley towards the border crossing with Moldova at Lipcani.

== Mass grave ==
In November 2010, a mass grave dating from 1941 was discovered in the nearby forest of Vulturi. It is believed to contain the remains of up to a hundred Jewish men, women and children murdered by Romanian authorities contemporaneously with the nearby Iași pogrom. It is the first such grave found in Romania since the 1945 discovery of 311 bodies at Stânca-Roznovanu, also in the vicinity of Iași. An official report concluded that the grave contained 36 victims, and that those responsible for the killing had already been sentenced in 1948.

== Popricani in Jewish literature ==
The village of Popricani was featured in the 1953 memoir Mayn tatns khretshme ("My Father's Tavern") by Yiddish writer Yitskhok Horowitz. Horowitz recounts his childhood in the family tavern, growing up in the sole Jewish family in the village of Popricani, with episodic tales of wolves, Shabbat, and the 1907 Romanian Peasants' Revolt. An English translation of the book, "The Tavern of Popricani" translated by Ollie Elkus, was published by Naydus Press in 2022.
