= Durduc River =

Durduc River may refer to:

- Durduc, a tributary of the Săuzeni in Iași County, Romania
- Durduc, another name for the Stavnic, a tributary of the Bârlad in Iași County and Vaslui County, Romania
