= Valea Mărului (disambiguation) =

Valea Mărului may refer to several places in Romania:

- Valea Mărului, a commune in Galați County
- Valea Mărului, a village in Budeasa Commune, Argeș County
- Valea Mărului, a village in Lipova Commune, Bacău County
- Valea Mărului, a tributary of the Bârsa in Brașov County
- Valea Mărului, a tributary of the Prahova near Azuga, Prahova County
- Valea Mărului, a tributary of the Prahova near Sinaia, Prahova County
- Valea Mărului, a tributary of the Rusca in Caraș-Severin County
- Valea Mărului (Someș), a left tributary of the river Someșul Mic in Cluj County

== See also ==
- Măru (disambiguation)
