= Liteni (disambiguation) =

Liteni may refer to several places in Romania:

- Liteni, a town in Suceava County
- Liteni, a village in Săvădisla Commune, Cluj County
- Liteni, a village in Belcești Commune, Iaşi County
- Liteni, a village in Moara Commune, Suceava County
