= Măru =

Măru may refer to several places in Romania:

- Măru, a village in Zăvoi Commune, Caraș-Severin County
- Măru, a village in Logrești Commune, Gorj County
- Pârâul Mărului, a river in Vrancea County

== See also ==
- Măru Roșu (disambiguation), the name of several villages in Romania
- Maru (disambiguation)
- Merești (disambiguation)
- Merișor (disambiguation)
- Merișoru (disambiguation)
- Merișani (disambiguation)
- Poiana Mărului (disambiguation)
- Valea Mărului (disambiguation)
