= Bogonos =

- Location within Romania

Location
- Country: Romania
- Counties: Iași County
- Villages: Bogonos

Physical characteristics
- Mouth: Bahlui
  - coordinates: 47.1695°N 27.4819°E
- Length: 14 km (8.7 mi)
- Basin size: 52 km^{2} (20 sq mi)

Basin features
- Progression: Bahlui→ Jijia→ Prut→ Danube→ Black Sea
- Tributaries
  - right: Roșior
- River code: XIII.1.15.32.17a

The Bogonos is a left tributary of the river Bahlui in Romania. It flows into the Bahlui in Valea Lupului. Its length is 14 km (8.7 mi) and its basin size is 52 km^{2} (20 sq mi).
