= Ion Negrescu =

Romanian politician (1893–1977)

Mayor of Chișinău
- In office 1928–1931
- Preceded by: Gherman Pântea
- Succeeded by: Constantin Ionescu

Personal details
- Born: January 8, 1893 Holboca, Iași County, Kingdom of Romania
- Died: February 12, 1977 (aged 84) Budeasa, Argeș County, Socialist Republic of Romania
- Education: University of Iași

Ion (Ioan) Negrescu (8 January 1893 – 12 February 1977) was a Romanian politician, Mayor of Chișinău for 1928–1931.

== Biography ==
Ion Negrescu was born on 8 January 1893 in Holboca commune, Iași County. He graduated from the National High School in Iași, and became a graduate of the Romanian Philology section of the University of Iași. He earned his PhD in Slavistics in 1925, under the guidance of Professor Garabet Ibrăileanu.

He was mobilized in 1917–1918 as a reserve lieutenant for the 13th Infantry Regiment "Ștefan cel Mare", participated in the heavy battles in Mărăști and Mărășești, and was awarded the medal "Commemorative Cross of the 1916–1918 War with the Mărăști strap". Negrescu was the Mayor of Chișinău in two legislations (1928–1931), then, the secretary general of the Ministry of Bessarabia (1932–1935).

In the history of Chișinău, he was the first and last philosopher to become mayor. He was a descendant of a family of teachers and scholars. Besides his political career, Negrescu was also a philosopher, high school teacher, university professor, author of books dedicated to Bessarabia writers, such as Bogdan Petriceicu Hasdeu, and the author of medical studies.

Together with Pan Halippa, Negrescu founded the People's University of Chișinău.

He died in 1977, in Budeasa commune, Argeș County.
