= Ćirić =

Ćirić (Serbian Cyrillic: Ћирић, pronounced [tɕǐːritɕ]) is a Serbian surname. It may refer to:

- Aleksandar Ćirić (born 1977), Serbian water polo player
- Dragan Ćirić (born 1974), Serbian retired footballer who played as a midfielder
- Milovan Ćirić (1918–1986), Serbian football (soccer) coach and also former player
- Nikola Ćirić (born 1983), Serbian tennis player
- Saša Ćirić (born 1968), former football player from the Republic of Macedonia of Serbian origin
- Zoran Ćirić (born 1962), writer from Niš, Serbia
- Lucija Ćirić Bagarić (born 2004), Croatian tennis player

== See also ==
- Ciric (river), tributary of the river Bahlui in Romania
