= Totoești =

- Location within Romania

Location
- Country: Romania
- Counties: Iași County
- Villages: Totoești

Physical characteristics
- Mouth: Bahlui
  - coordinates: 47.2108°N 27.2881°E
- Length: 11 km (6.8 mi)
- Basin size: 25 km^{2} (9.7 sq mi)

Basin features
- Progression: Bahlui→ Jijia→ Prut→ Danube→ Black Sea
- River code: XIII.1.15.32.12a

The Totoești is a left tributary of the river Bahlui in Romania. It flows into the Bahlui in Podu Iloaiei. Its length is 11 km (6.8 mi) and its basin size is 25 km^{2} (9.7 sq mi).
