= Gurguiata =

- Location within Romania

Location
- Country: Romania
- Counties: Iași County

Physical characteristics
- Mouth: Bahlui
  - coordinates: 47.2854°N 27.1454°E
- Length: 33 km (21 mi)
- Basin size: 127 km^{2} (49 sq mi)

Basin features
- Progression: Bahlui→ Jijia→ Prut→ Danube→ Black Sea
- Tributaries
  - right: Valea Nucului

The Gurguiata is a left tributary of the river Bahlui in Romania. It discharges into the Bahlui near Belcești. Its length is 33 km (21 mi) and its basin size is 127 km^{2} (49 sq mi). The Gurguiata valley has been heavily modified by human activity. There are many storage reservoirs in the valley, used mainly for flood control and for intensive fishing. The largest of these is Lake Plopi, located northeast of Belcești.
