= Merișor =

Merișor may refer to several places in Romania:

- Merișor, a village in Sita Buzăului Commune, Covasna County
- Merișor (Hungarian: Merisor), a village in Bănița Commune, Hunedoara County
- Merișor, a village in Bucureșci Commune, Hunedoara County
- Merișor, a village in Tăuții-Măgherăuș Town, Maramureș County
- Merișor, a village in Glodeni Commune, Mureș County
- Merișoru de Munte (Merisor), a village in Cerbăl Commune, Hunedoara County

== See also ==
- Merești (disambiguation)
- Merișoru (disambiguation)
- Merișani (disambiguation)
