= Constantin Ionescu (politician) =

Romanian politician

Mayor of Chişinău
- In office 1931–1932
- Preceded by: Ion Negrescu
- Succeeded by: Gherman Pântea

Constantin Ionescu was a Romanian politician, mayor of Chişinău between 1931–1932.
