= Voinești (river) =

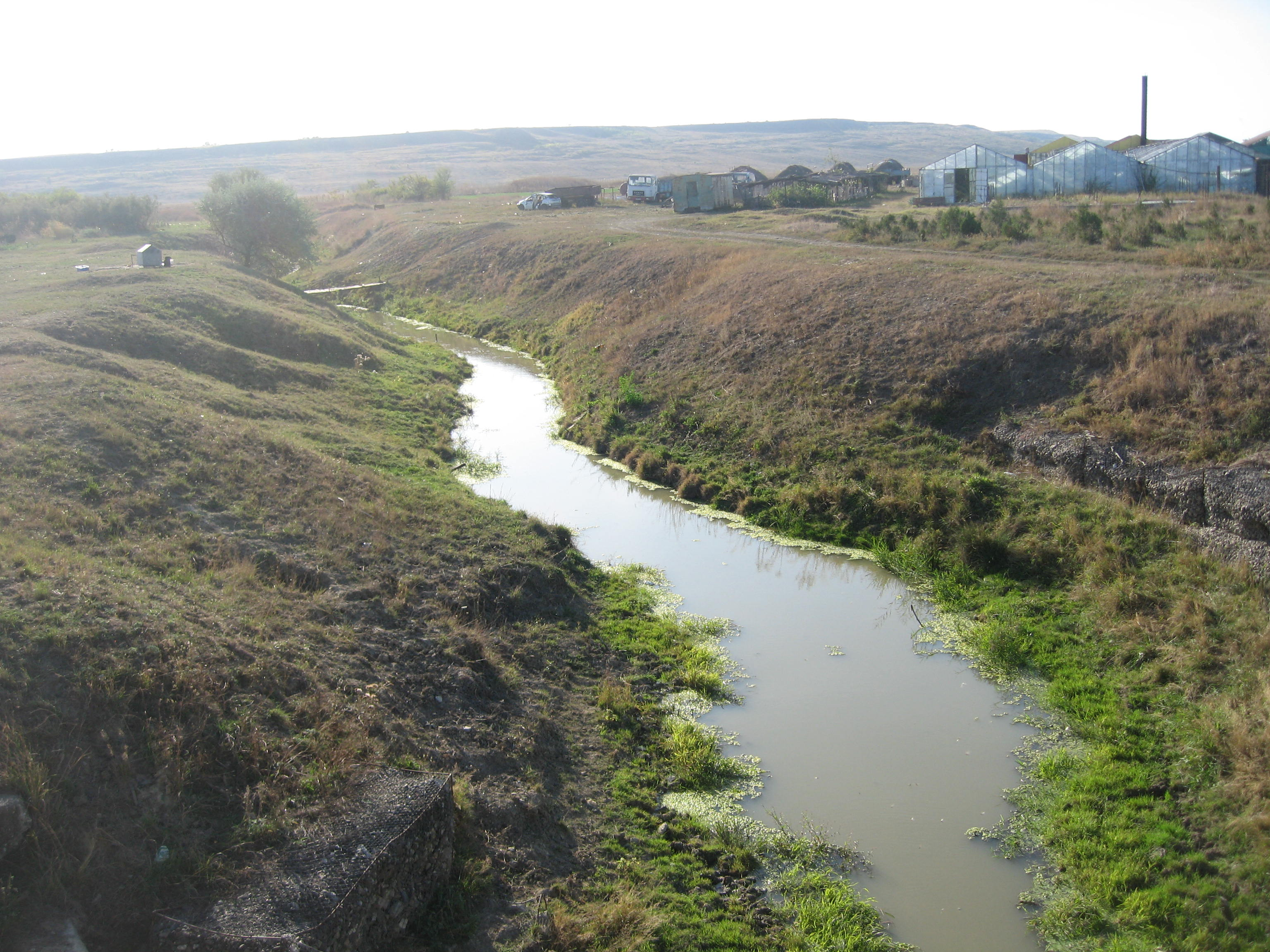

- Location within Romania

Location
- Country: Romania
- Counties: Iași County
- Villages: Voinești

Physical characteristics
- Mouth: Bahlui
  - coordinates: 47.1795°N 27.4301°E
- Length: 17 km (11 mi)
- Basin size: 138 km^{2} (53 sq mi)

Basin features
- Progression: Bahlui→ Jijia→ Prut→ Danube→ Black Sea
- Tributaries
  - left: Horlești, Săuzeni

The Voinești is a right tributary of the river Bahlui in Romania. It discharges into the Bahlui in Lețcani. Its length is 17 km (11 mi) and its basin size is 138 km^{2} (53 sq mi). Lake Cucuteni is located on the Voinești.
