= Nicolina (river) =

River in Romania

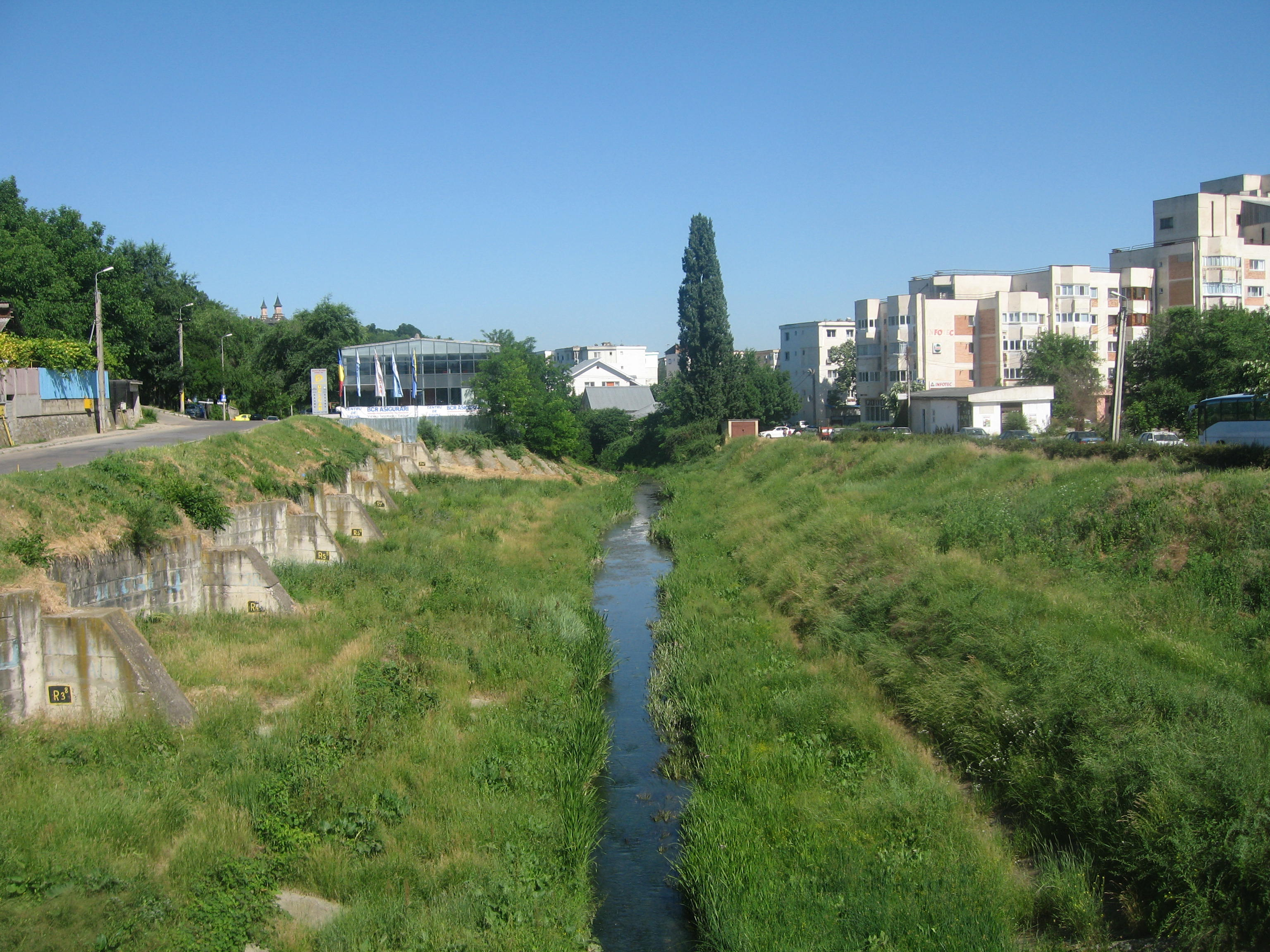

- Location within Romania

Location
- Country: Romania
- Counties: Iași County

Physical characteristics
- Source: Bârnova
  - elevation: 300 m (980 ft)
- Mouth: Bahlui
  - coordinates: 47.1578°N 27.5699°E
- Length: 20 km (12 mi)
- Basin size: 177 km^{2} (68 sq mi)
- Discharge
  - location: mouth
  - average: 0.498 m3/s
  - maximum: 87 m3/s

Basin features
- Progression: Bahlui→ Jijia→ Prut→ Danube→ Black Sea
- Tributaries
  - left: Valea Locii, Ezăreni
- River code: XIII.1.15.32.20

The Nicolina is a right tributary of the river Bahlui in eastern Romania. It flows into the Bahlui in the city Iași. Its length is 20 km (12 mi) and its basin size is 177 km^{2} (68 sq mi).
