= Măru Roșu =

Măru Roșu may refer to several villages in Romania:

- Măru Roșu, a village in the town of Însurăței, Brăila County
- Măru Roșu, a village in Corcova Commune, Mehedinți County

== See also ==
- Măru (disambiguation)
