= Hoisești (river) =

River in Romania

- Location within Romania

Location
- Country: Romania
- Counties: Iași County
- Villages: Românești

Physical characteristics
- Mouth: Bahlui
  - coordinates: 47.1915°N 27.3812°E
- Length: 15 km (9.3 mi)
- Basin size: 38 km^{2} (15 sq mi)

Basin features
- Progression: Bahlui→ Jijia→ Prut→ Danube→ Black Sea
- River code: XIII.1.15.32.13

The Hoisești is a left tributary of the river Bahlui in Romania. It flows into the Bahlui near Lețcani. Its length is 15 km (9.3 mi) and its basin size is 38 km^{2} (15 sq mi).
