= Sava Caracaș =

Romanian general (1890–1945)

- Born: October 31, 1890; Lețcani, Iași County, Kingdom of Romania
- Died: March 15, 1945 (aged 54); Alba Iulia, Kingdom of Romania
- Burial place: Heroes Cemetery, Alba Iulia, Romania
- Military career
- Allegiance: Kingdom of Romania
- Branch: Army
- Service years: 1912–1945
- Rank: Brigadier general
- Commands: 10th Infantry Division; 7th Training Division
- Conflicts: World War II; Battle of the Caucasus; Battle of Turda (DOW)
- Awards: Order of the Star of Romania, Officer rank and Commander rank Order of the Crown (Romania) Commander rank

Sava Caracaș (31 October 1890 – 15 March 1945) was a Romanian brigadier general during World War II.

== Career ==
He was born in 1890 in Lețcani, Iași County. After graduating the Infantry Military School in 1912 with the rank of second lieutenant, he advanced in rank to lieutenant colonel in 1930 and colonel in 1936.

In 1938, Caracaș served as Prefect of Iași County. At the order of the Minister of Interior, Armand Călinescu, he ordered the search of known sympathizers of the Iron Guard, who were suspected of possessing weapons and propaganda materials. Wearing a mărțișor was forbidden that year, since it was viewed as political insignia.

From May 1941 to January 1942, he served as chief of staff 4th Corps Area. On 22 June 1941 Romania joined Operation Barbarossa in order to reclaim the lost territories of Bessarabia and Bukovina, which had been annexed by the Soviet Union in June 1940. From 29 June to 6 July 1941, the Iași pogrom was launched by governmental forces under Marshal Ion Antonescu against the Jewish community in Iași. On August 25, the commander of the 4th Corps Area, General Constantin Cernătescu, and his chief of staff, Colonel Caracaș, ordered all inhabitants of ethnic Jewish origin from the territory under their authority (the counties of Iași, Baia, Botoșani, Roman, Bălți, and Soroca) to wear a yellow badge on their chest.

In January 1942, Caracaș was promoted to brigadier general. Starting în March 1942, he was Commanding Officer of the 10th Infantry Division. In August 1942 he led his division in the Battle of the Caucasus. In October 1943 he went into reserve until June 1944, when he became General Officer Commanding 7th Training Division. After the coup d'état of 23 August 1944, Romania switched sides and declared war on Nazi Germany. In September–October of that year, Caracaș fought with his division at the Battle of Turda, under the command of general Gheorghe Avramescu. In October 1944 he was appointed General Officer Commanding 20th Training Division. Gravely wounded in combat that month, he was sent to the Carol Davila military hospital in Alba Iulia, where he succumbed to his wounds in March 1945. He was buried in the city's Heroes Cemetery.

His awards include the Order of the Star of Romania, Officer rank (June 1940), Order of the Crown, Commander rank (December 1943), and Order of the Star, Commander rank (post-mortem, May 1945).
