= Merișani (disambiguation) =

Merișani may refer to several places in Romania:

- Merișani, a commune in Argeș County
- Merișani, a village in Băbăița Commune, Teleorman County
- Merișani, a village in Dobroteşti Commune, Teleorman County

== See also ==
- Măru (disambiguation)
- Merești (disambiguation)
- Merișor (disambiguation)
- Merișoru (disambiguation)
