= Buhalnița (Bahlui) =

- Location within Romania

Location
- Country: Romania
- Counties: Iași County
- Villages: Sticlăria, Buhalnița

Physical characteristics
- Mouth: Bahlui
  - coordinates: 47.3698°N 26.9710°E
- Length: 16 km (9.9 mi)
- Basin size: 33 km^{2} (13 sq mi)

Basin features
- Progression: Bahlui→ Jijia→ Prut→ Danube→ Black Sea
- River code: XIII.1.15.32.4

The Buhalnița is a right tributary of the river Bahlui in Romania. It flows into the Bahlui in Ceplenița. Its length is 16 km (9.9 mi) and its basin size is 33 km^{2} (13 sq mi).
