= Măgura (Bahlui) =

- Location within Romania

Location
- Country: Romania
- Counties: Iași County
- Villages: Cireșeni, Cârjoaia

Physical characteristics
- Mouth: Bahlui
  - coordinates: 47.3303°N 27.0103°E
- Length: 25 km (16 mi)
- Basin size: 78 km^{2} (30 sq mi)

Basin features
- Progression: Bahlui→ Jijia→ Prut→ Danube→ Black Sea
- River code: XIII.1.15.32.6

The Măgura is a right tributary of the river Bahlui in Romania. It flows into the Bahlui in Hodora. Its length is 25 km (16 mi) and its basin size is 78 km^{2} (30 sq mi).
