= Constantin Erbiceanu =

Romanian theologian and historian

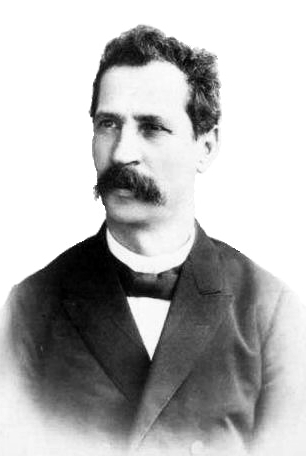
Constantin Erbiceanu

Constantin Erbiceanu (born Constantin Ionescu; August 15, 1838–March 21, 1913) was a Romanian theologian and historian.

Born in Erbiceni, Iași County, his father was the Romanian Orthodox priest Ioan Ionescu. His mother died when he was ten. The family was of modest means, but he was more affluent following his 1873 marriage to Aglae Negrescu. He studied at the Veniamin Costache seminary from 1850 to 1858 and the theology and literature faculties of the University of Iași from 1860 to 1864. From 1865 to 1868, he attended specialty courses in theology at Athens University. He was a professor of general church history and canon law at Socola Seminary in Iași from 1868 to 1886, and at the central seminary in Bucharest from 1886 to 1892. While in Iași, his family home had an elevated intellectual atmosphere. Frequent visitors included A. D. Xenopol, Alexandru Lambrior, and George Panu; even Mihai Eminescu dropped in at times.

From 1887 to 1892, he was a professor of introductory theology at the University of Bucharest's theology faculty, teaching canon law there from 1892 to 1903. He served as faculty dean from 1896 to 1900, and from 1897 to 1904 was a substitute professor of Greek at that institution. Elected a corresponding member of the Romanian Academy in 1890, he was raised to titular status in 1899. He also belonged to learned societies in Constantinople.

Among Romania's first Hellenic studies specialists, he translated and published numerous Greek documents regarding the history of the Romanians. These appeared especially in Revista Teologică, which he led from 1883 to 1887, and also in Biserica Ortodoxă Română. Other studies deal with the history of the church in Moldavia and the lives of Romanian cultural personalities. His daughter Constanța became a noted pianist and music professor. One son became a road engineer, another studied literature, and a third took up a military career.
