= Merești (disambiguation) =

Mereşti may refer to:

- Mereşti, a commune in Harghita County, Romania
- Mereşti, a village in Vultureşti Commune, Suceava County, Romania
- Merești River, a tributary of the Homorodul Mic River in Romania

== See also ==
- Măru (disambiguation)
- Merișor (disambiguation)
- Merișoru (disambiguation)
- Merișani (disambiguation)
