= Iași metropolitan area =

Metropolitan area of Romania

- Metropolitan area
- Coordinates: 47°9′44″N 27°35′20″E
- Country: Romania
- County: Iași
- Central Municipality: Iași
- Functional: 2004

Area
  - Total: 1,159 km^{2} (447 sq mi)

Population (2021 census)
  - Total: 423,154
  - Density: 366/km^{2} (950/sq mi)
- Time zone: UTC+2 (EET)
  - Summer (DST): UTC+3 (EEST)
- Postal Code: 70wxyz (Note: w, x, y, and z are digits that indicate the street, part of the street, or even the building of the address)
- Area code: +40 x32 (Note: x is a digit indicating the operator: 2 for the former national operator, Romtelecom, and 3 for the other ground telephone networks)
- Website: http://www.zmi.ro/

The Iași metropolitan area is a metropolitan association in Iași County, Romania. It consists of the municipality of Iași and 19 nearby communes.

== Geography ==
With an area of 1,159 square kilometres (447 sq mi), the Iași metropolitan area occupies 21.2% of Iași County's total area of 5,476 square kilometres (2,114 sq mi).

== History ==
Iași metropolitan area was constituted on 8 April 2004, to create a better business environment, to attract more consistent investments and to better coordinate environmental and infrastructure projects.

== Demographics ==
Per the 2021 census, the Iași metropolitan area has 423,154 inhabitants, 55.6% of Iași County's total population of 760,774.

As defined by Eurostat, with 500,668 residents (as of 2018), the Iași functional urban area is the second most populous in Romania (after Bucharest).

Population census
Year	2002	2011	2021
Pop.	422,770	403,572	423,154
±%	—	−4.5%	+4.9%

== Transportation ==
Iași is served by Iași International Airport.

Major roads in Iași are national roads DN24 and DN28, which are both part of European routes E58 and E583. CTP Iași offers transport services for the Iași Metropolitan Public Transport Association (Asociația Metropolitană de Transport Public Iași; AMTPI).

== Communities ==
=== Cities ===
- Iași

=== Communes ===
- Aroneanu
- Bârnova
- Ciurea
- Comarna
- Dobrovăţ
- Holboca
- Lețcani
- Miroslava
- Mogoşeşti
- Movileni
- Popricani
- Prisăcani
- Rediu
- Schitu Duca
- Tomești
- Ţuţora
- Ungheni
- Valea Lupului
- Victoria
