= Cacaina =

Cacaina Șorogari
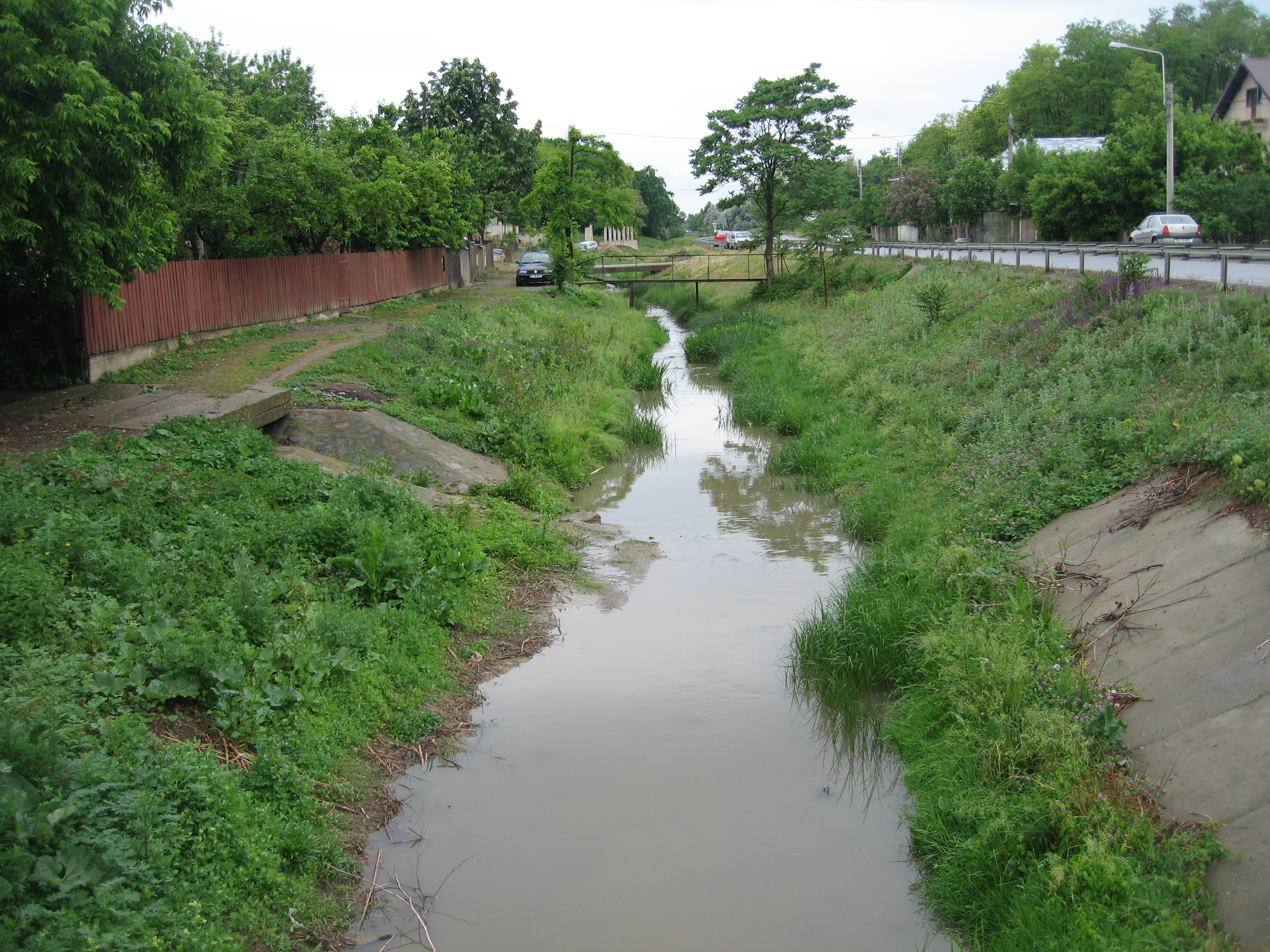

- Location within Romania

Location
- Country: Romania
- Counties: Iași County

Physical characteristics
- Mouth: Bahlui
  - coordinates: 47.1539°N 27.6050°E
- Length: 21 km (13 mi)
- Basin size: 63 km^{2} (24 sq mi)

Basin features
- Progression: Bahlui→ Jijia→ Prut→ Danube→ Black Sea
- River code: XIII.1.15.32.21

The Cacaina (also: Șorogari) is a left tributary of the river Bahlui in eastern Romania. It flows into the Bahlui in the city Iași. Its length is 21 km (13 mi) and its basin size is 63 km^{2} (24 sq mi). The Vânători and Cârlig dams are located on the river.
