= Tudora, Botoșani =

Tudora
- Commune
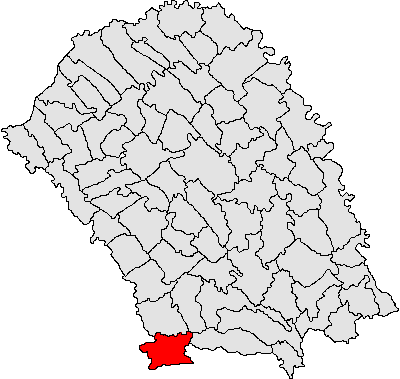
- Location in Botoșani County

- Location in Romania
- Coordinates: 47°31′N 26°38′E
- Country: Romania
- County: Botoșani

Government
  - Mayor (2024–2028): Constantin Cocoreanu (PSD)
- Area: 65.93 km^{2} (25.46 sq mi)
- Elevation: 290 m (950 ft)
- Population (2021-12-01): 4,852
  - Density: 73.59/km^{2} (190.6/sq mi)
- Time zone: UTC+02:00 (EET)
  - Summer (DST): UTC+03:00 (EEST)
- Postal code: 717410
- Area code: +40 x31
- Vehicle reg.: BT

Tudora is a commune in Botoșani County, Western Moldavia, Romania. It is composed of a single village, Tudora.
