= Victoria, Iași =

Victoria
- Commune
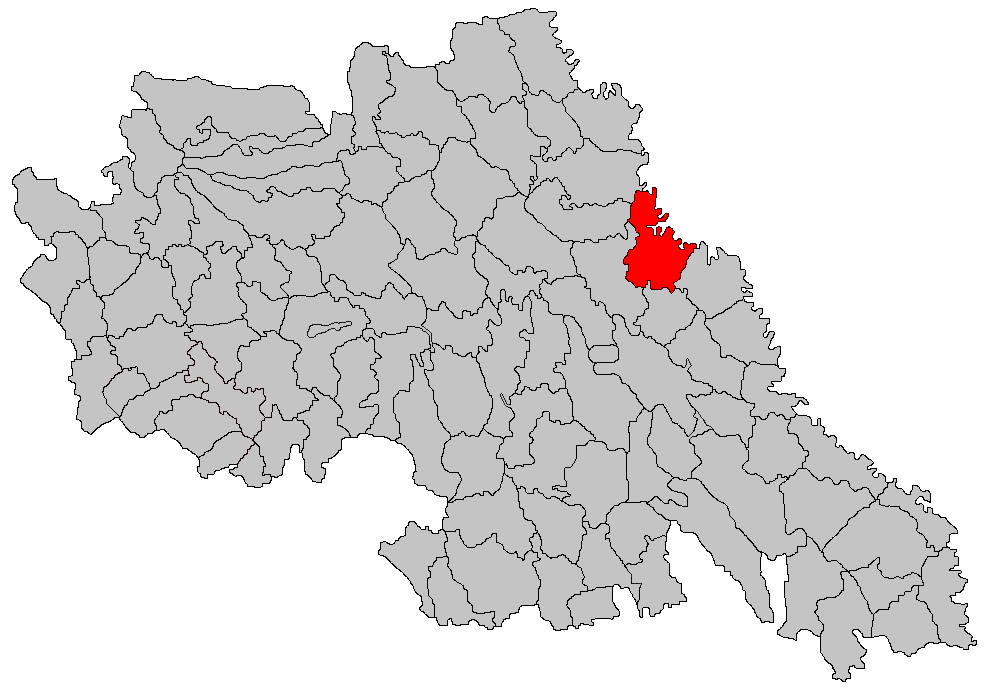
- Location in Iași County

- Location in Romania
- Coordinates: 47°18′N 27°36′E
- Country: Romania
- County: Iași
- Subdivisions: Victoria, Frăsuleni, Icușeni, Luceni, Sculeni, Stânca, Șendreni

Government
  - Mayor (2024–2028): Daniel Crețu (PNL)
- Area: 62.16 km^{2} (24.00 sq mi)
- Elevation: 41 m (135 ft)
- Population (2021-12-01): 3,819
  - Density: 61/km^{2} (160/sq mi)
- Time zone: EET/EEST (UTC+2/+3)
- Postal code: 707580
- Area code: +40 x32
- Vehicle reg.: IS
- Website: comunavictoria.ro

Victoria is a commune in Iași County, Western Moldavia, Romania, part of the Iași metropolitan area. It is composed of seven villages: Frăsuleni, Icușeni, Luceni, Sculeni, Stânca, Șendreni and Victoria.

Sculeni is a border checkpoint to Moldova.
