= Ciric (river) =

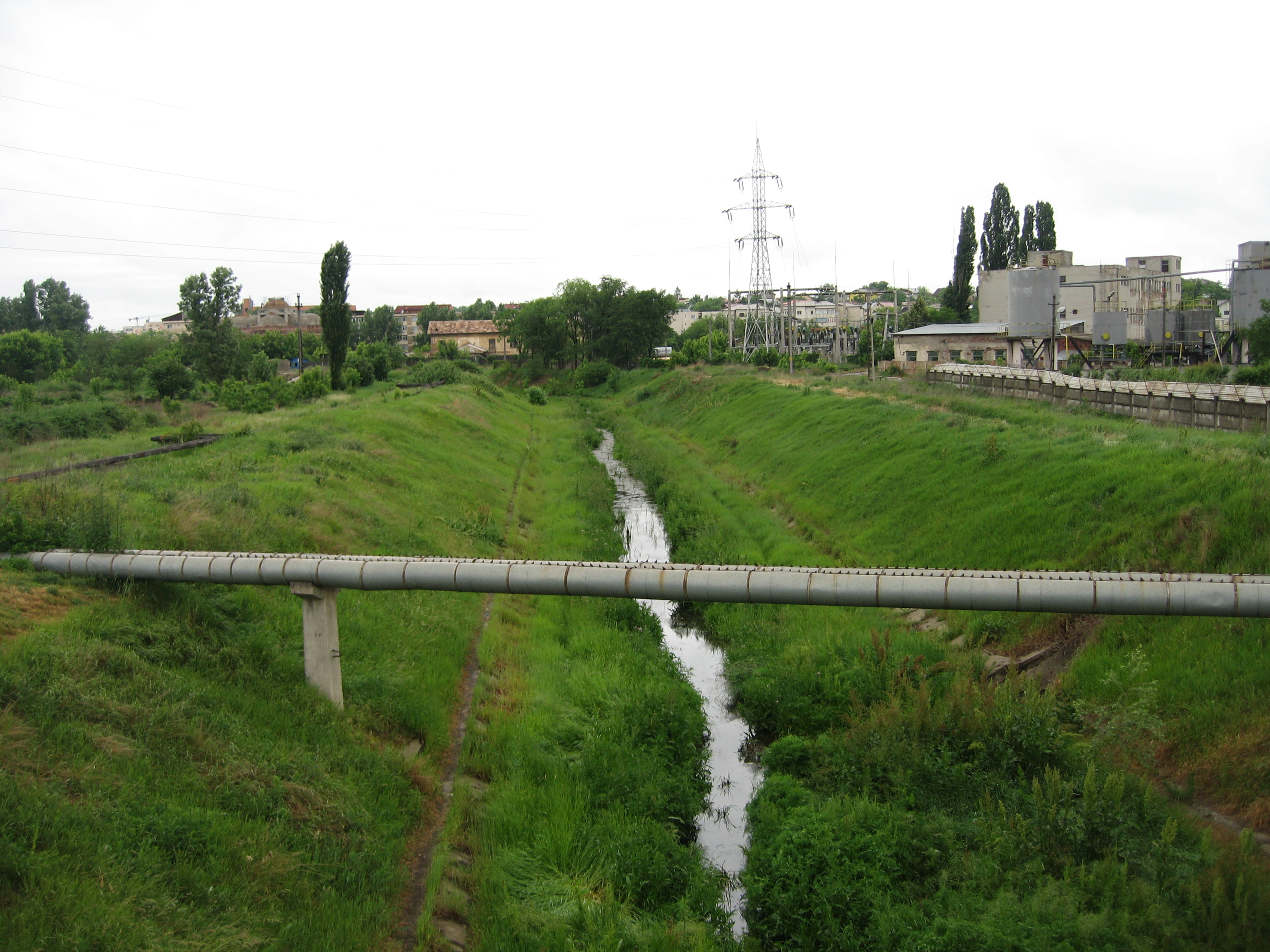

- Location within Romania

Location
- Country: Romania
- Counties: Iași County
- City: Iași

Physical characteristics
- Mouth: Bahlui
  - location: Iași
  - coordinates: 47.1501°N 27.6285°E
- Length: 17 km (11 mi)
- Basin size: 58 km^{2} (22 sq mi)

Basin features
- Progression: Bahlui→ Jijia→ Prut→ Danube→ Black Sea

The Ciric is a left tributary of the river Bahlui in Romania. It discharges into the Bahlui in the city Iași. Its length is 17 km (11 mi) and its basin size is 58 km^{2} (22 sq mi). Lakes Dorobanț, Aroneanu, Ciric I, Ciric II, Ciric III are located on the river Ciric, in the northeastern part of Iași. Over time, along the lakes of the Ciric, several leisure centers have been built.

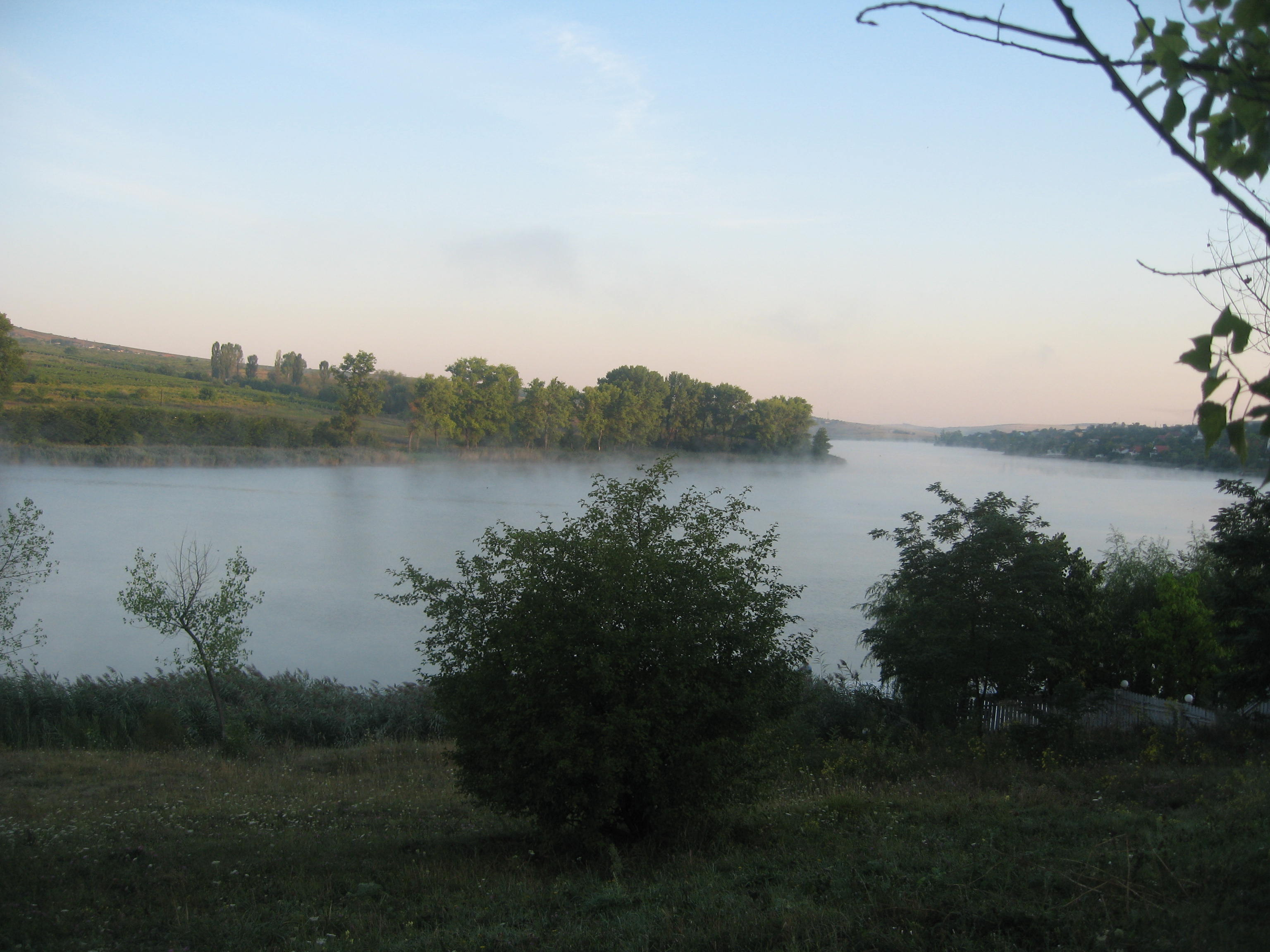
Lake Dorobanț
