= Lețcani =

- Commune
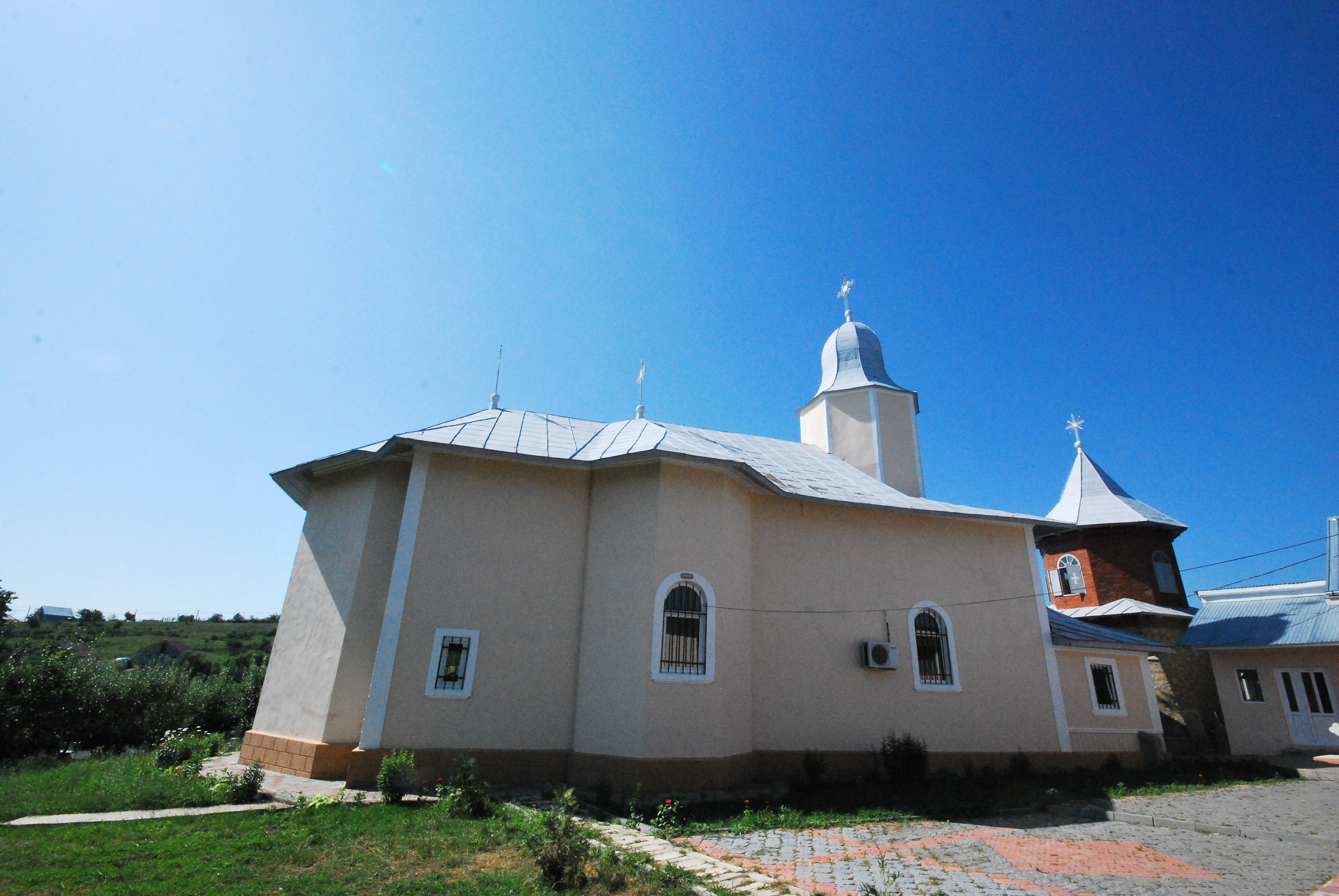
- St. Spiridon Church in Cogeasca

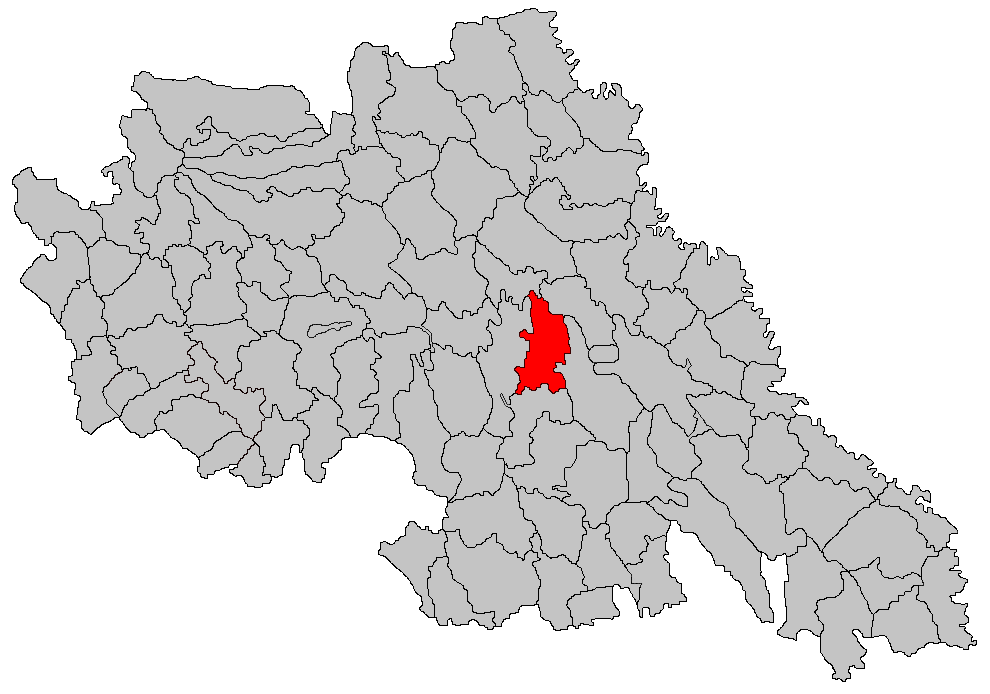
- Location in Iași County

- Location in Romania
- Coordinates: 47°11′N 27°25′E
- Country: Romania
- County: Iași

Government
  - Mayor (2020–2024): Stelian Turcu (PNL)
- Area: 58.55 km^{2} (22.61 sq mi)
- Elevation: 81 m (266 ft)
- Population (2021-12-01): 6,845
  - Density: 116.9/km^{2} (302.8/sq mi)
- Time zone: UTC+02:00 (EET)
  - Summer (DST): UTC+03:00 (EEST)
- Postal code: 707280
- Area code: +(40) 232
- Vehicle reg.: IS

Lețcani is a commune in Iași County, Western Moldavia, Romania, part of the Iași metropolitan area. It is composed of four villages: Bogonos, Cogeasca, Cucuteni and Lețcani.

The commune is situated on the Moldavian Plateau, at an altitude of 81 m (266 ft). It lies on the banks of the river Bahlui and its right tributary, the river Voinești; the river Săuzeni flows into the Voinești in Cogeasca.

Among historians and archaeologists, Lețcani is famous as the place where one of the very few known Gothic runic inscriptions was found, on a spindle whorl dated to the 4th century.

== Natives ==
- Sava Caracaș (1890–1945), brigadier general during World War II
