= Tomești, Iași =

Tomești
- Commune

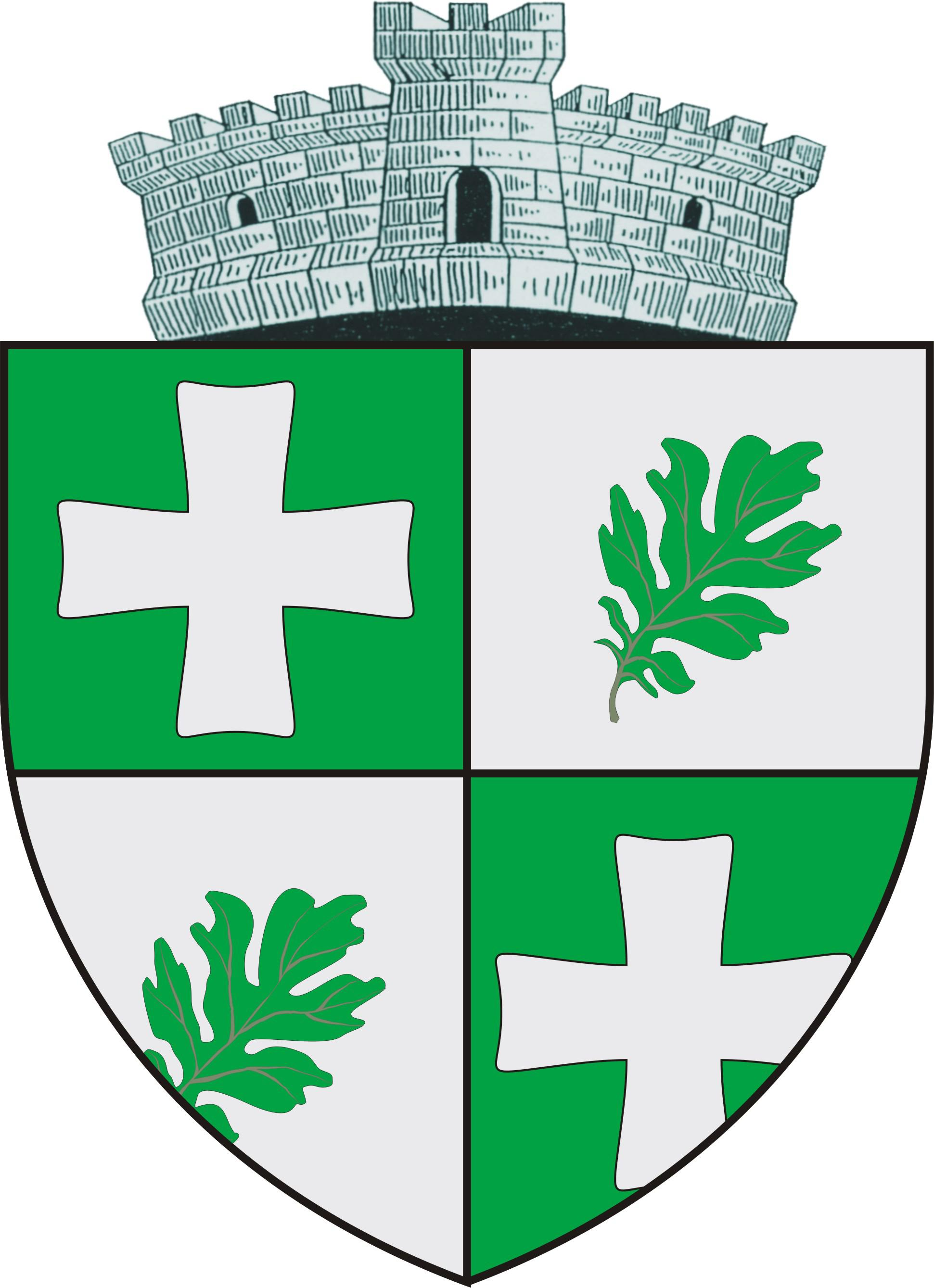
- Coat of arms

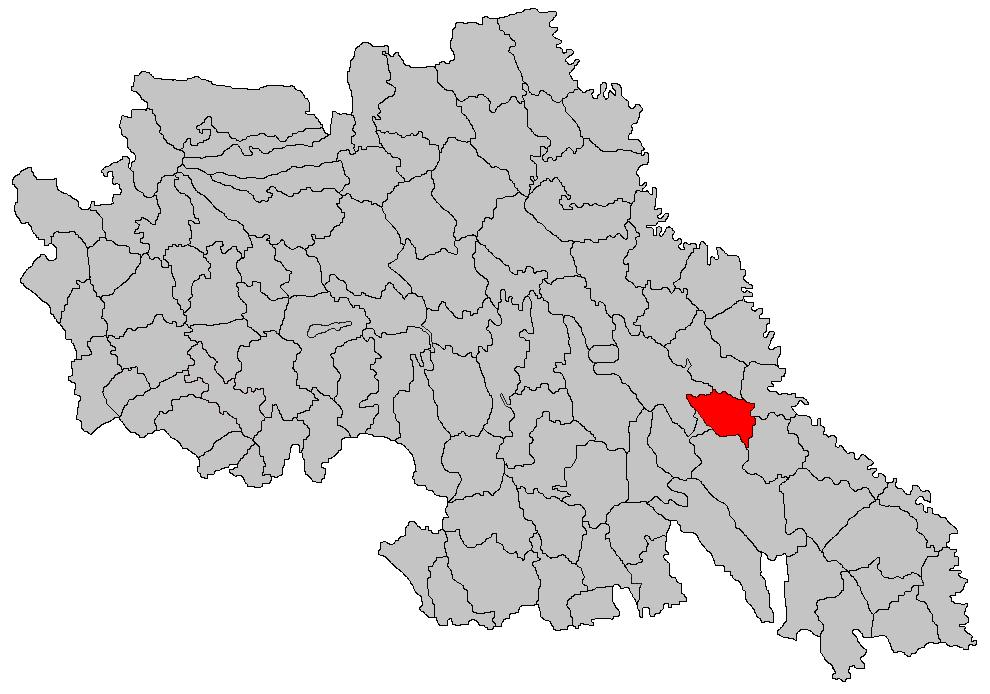
- Location in Iași County

- Location in Romania
- Coordinates: 47°08′N 27°42′E
- Country: Romania
- County: Iași
- Subdivisions: Tomești, Chicerea, Goruni, Vlădiceni

Government
  - Mayor (2024–2028): Ștefan Timofte (PNL)
- Area: 37.11 km^{2} (14.33 sq mi)
- Elevation: 44 m (144 ft)
- Population (2021-12-01): 12,169
  - Density: 327.9/km^{2} (849.3/sq mi)
- Time zone: UTC+02:00 (EET)
  - Summer (DST): UTC+03:00 (EEST)
- Postal code: 707515
- Area code: +(40) 02 32
- Vehicle reg.: IS
- Website: www.comuna-tomesti.ro

Tomești is a commune in Iași County, Western Moldavia, Romania, part of the Iași metropolitan area. It is composed of four villages: Chicerea, Goruni, Tomești, and Vlădiceni.

== Natives ==
- Dimitrie D. Pătrășcanu (1872 – 1937), prose writer and dramatist
