= Cerbăl =

- Commune
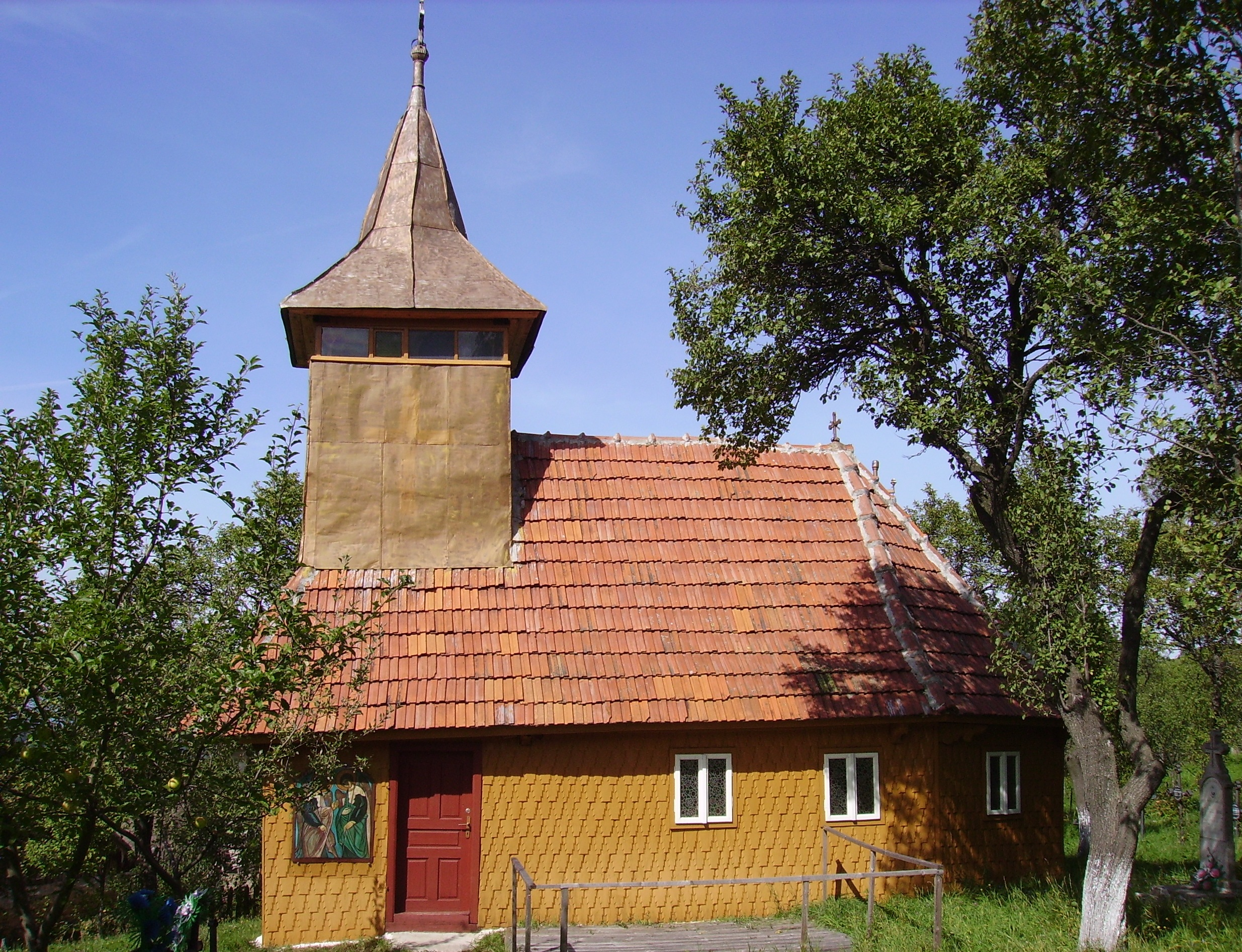
- Wooden church in Feregi

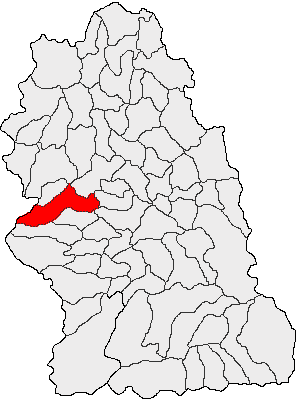
- Location in Hunedoara County

- Location in Romania
- Coordinates: 45°47′N 22°43′E
- Country: Romania
- County: Hunedoara

Government
  - Mayor (2024–2028): Mircea-Claudiu Costa (PSD)
- Area: 128.6 km^{2} (49.7 sq mi)
- Elevation: 852 m (2,795 ft)
- Population (2021-12-01): 403
  - Density: 3.13/km^{2} (8.12/sq mi)
- Time zone: UTC+02:00 (EET)
  - Summer (DST): UTC+03:00 (EEST)
- Postal code: 337180
- Area code: (+40) 0254
- Vehicle reg.: HD
- Website: www.primariacerbal.ro

Cerbăl (Hungarian: Cserbel) is a commune in Hunedoara County, Transylvania, Romania. It is composed of eight villages: Arănieș (Aranyos), Cerbăl, Feregi (Feresd), Merișoru de Munte (Meresd), Poienița Tomii (Pojenicatomi), Poiana Răchițelii (Pojánarekiceli), Socet (Szocsed), and Ulm (Ulm).

Historical population
Year	Pop.	±%
1850	1,602	—
1880	2,104	+31.3%
2002	665	−68.4%
2011	474	−28.7%
2021	403	−15.0%
Source: Census data
