= Belcești =

- Commune
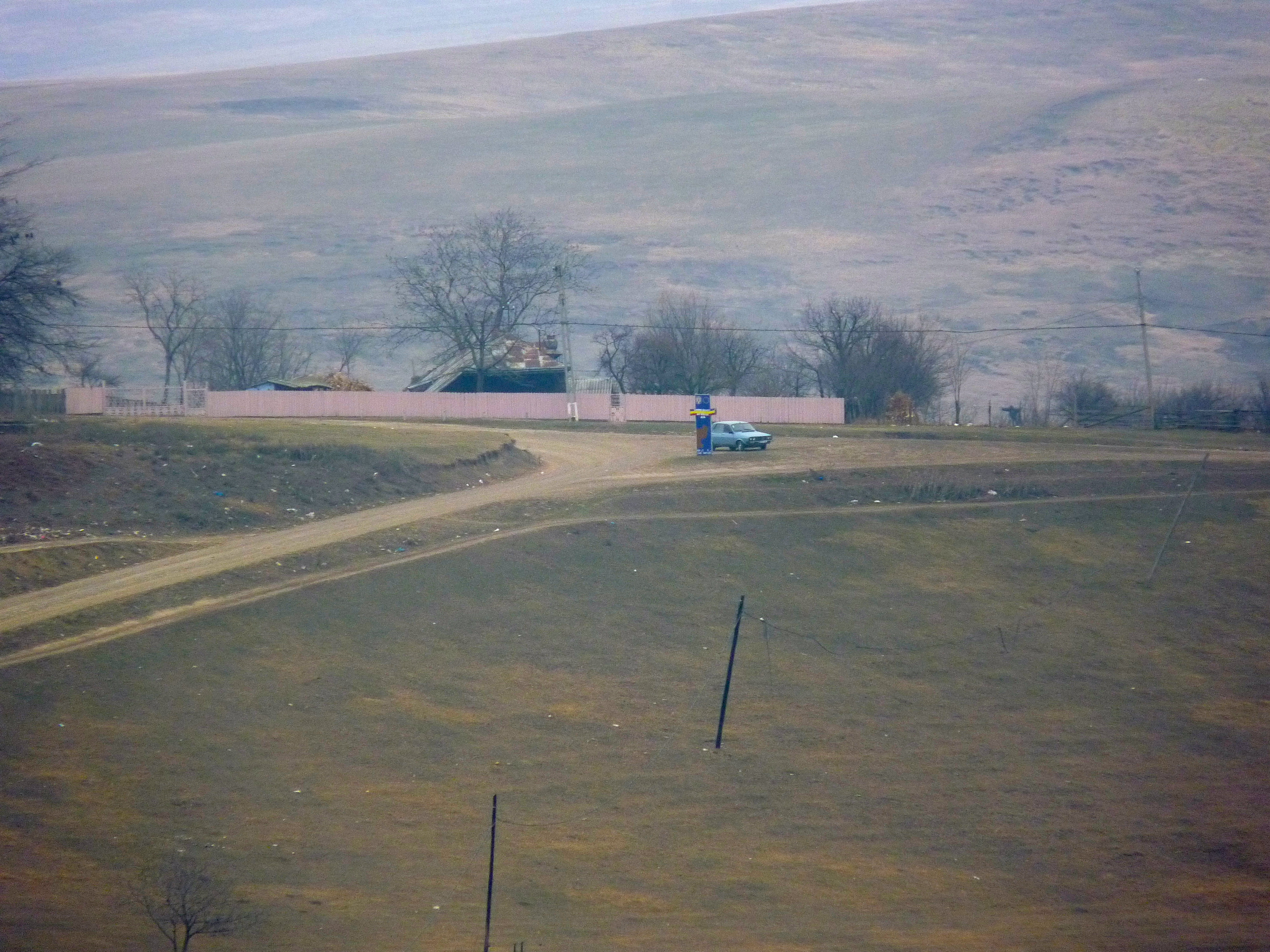
- Munteni village

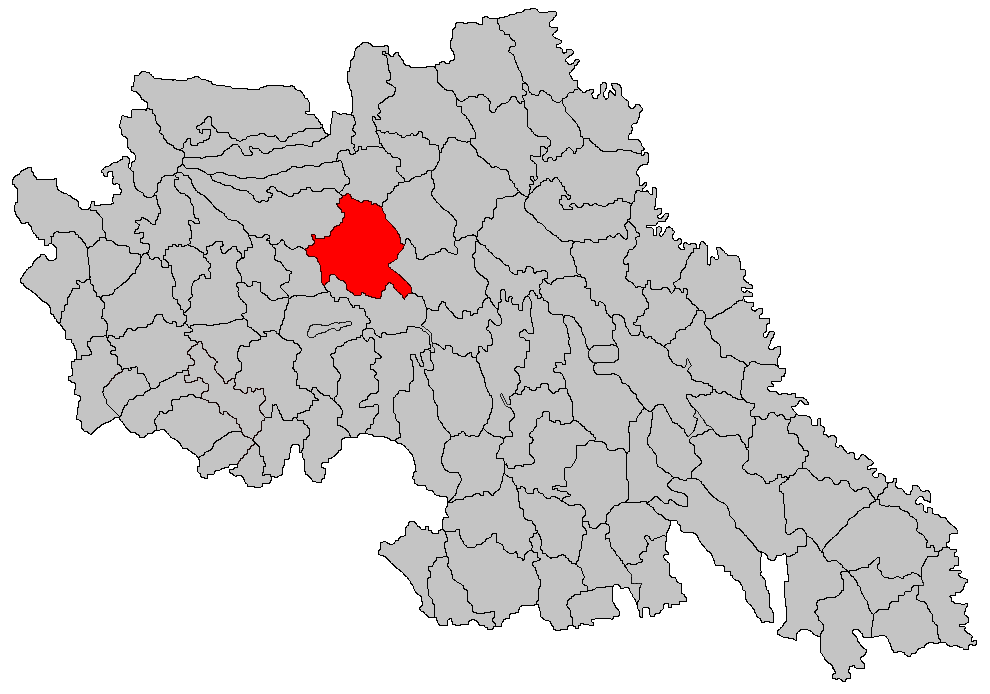
- Location in Iași County

- Location in Romania
- Coordinates: 47°19′N 27°06′E
- Country: Romania
- County: Iași

Government
  - Mayor (2020–2024): Dumitru Tanasă (PSD)
- Area: 103.88 km^{2} (40.11 sq mi)
- Elevation: 90 m (300 ft)
- Population (2021-12-01): 10,231
  - Density: 98.489/km^{2} (255.08/sq mi)
- Time zone: UTC+02:00 (EET)
  - Summer (DST): UTC+03:00 (EEST)
- Postal code: 707045
- Area code: +(40) 232
- Vehicle reg.: IS
- Website: comunabelcesti.ro

Belcești is a commune in Iași County, Western Moldavia, Romania. One of the county's largest communes, with a population of 10,231 as of 2021, it is composed of six villages: Belcești, Liteni, Munteni, Satu Nou, Tansa, and Ulmi.

The commune lies on the Moldavian Plateau, at an altitude of 90 m (300 ft), on the banks of the Bahlui River. It is located 47 km (29 mi) northwest of the county seat, Iași, on the Iași–Podu Iloaiei–Hârlău line.

In the vicinity of Belcești, the important Tansa-Belcești dam was built on the Bahlui River in order to prevent flooding. Most Belcești residents work in agriculture, with fishing another livelihood.

== History ==
Belcești was first mentioned in historical documents in 1420. Belcești's citizens appear again in the historical documents of Moldavia on April 5, 1448, under the reign of Petru Mușat. On May 12, 1489, Belcești appears in the historical documents of Moldavia with the royal church and court between the villages given by Stephen the Great to the boyars Negrescu and Ivașcu.

In the documents that are at the State Archives of Iași, it is mentioned that the ruler Petru Șchiopu on 4 February 1579 gave the village of Belcești with all the mills, to Galata Monastery in Iași. Another village component of the commune, Ulmi, was also given by Petru Șchiopu to St. Paraskevi Monastery in Iași, but the first document of giving was not preserved. So it is that the first mention about the village of Ulmi appears On August 2, 1597, during the reign of Ieremia Movilă.

This documentary attestation is preceded by various vestiges belonging to older times, such as the coins discovered in Belcești during the reign of Alexander the Good (1400–1432). In the documents arrived to us, it is specified that the decision of these villages was preserved "from the age" suggesting the idea that at the time of their elaboration the villages were old.

At first, at its appearance, Belcești was situated at east of the current village Ulmi, and between 1805 and 1820 a part of the inhabitants moved to the left side of Bahlui River forming the village Văleni — the other villages being formed by impropriety and swarming.
