= Dumești, Iași =

Dumești
- Commune
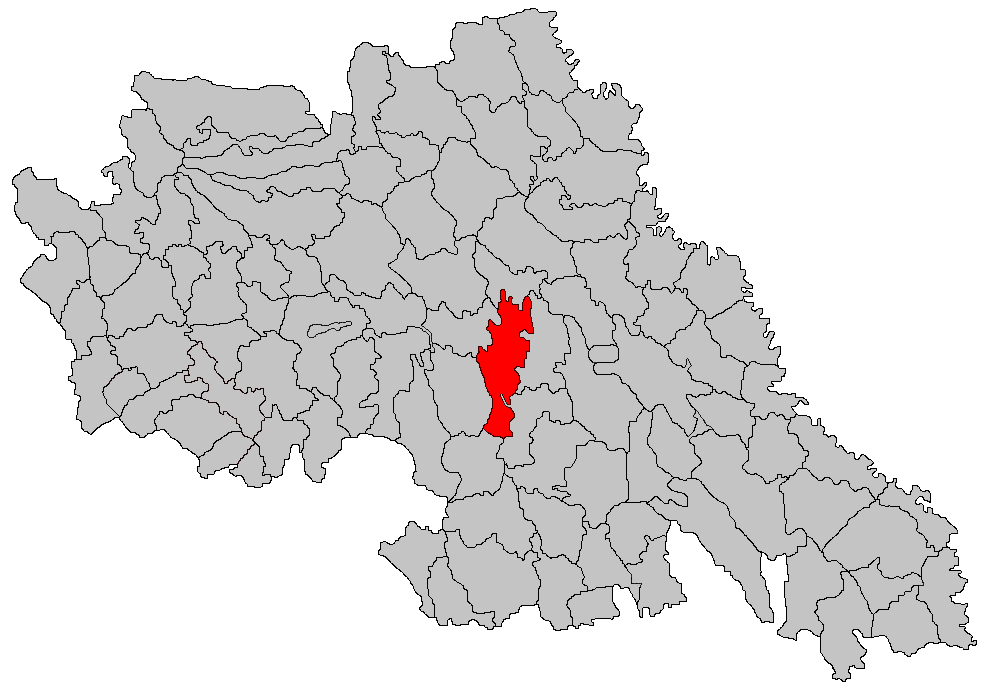
- Location in Iași County

- Location in Romania
- Coordinates: 47°10′N 27°20′E
- Country: Romania
- County: Iași
- Subdivisions: Dumești, Banu, Chilișoaia, Hoisești, Păușești

Government
  - Mayor (2024–2028): Gabriel Agavriloaie (PSD)
- Area: 71.38 km^{2} (27.56 sq mi)
- Elevation: 94 m (308 ft)
- Population (2021-12-01): 4,252
  - Density: 60/km^{2} (150/sq mi)
- Time zone: EET/EEST (UTC+2/+3)
- Postal code: 707185
- Area code: +40 x32
- Vehicle reg.: IS
- Website: comunadumesti.ro

Dumești is a commune in Iași County, Western Moldavia, Romania. It is composed of five villages: Banu, Chilișoaia, Dumești, Hoisești and Păușești.
