= Bahlui =

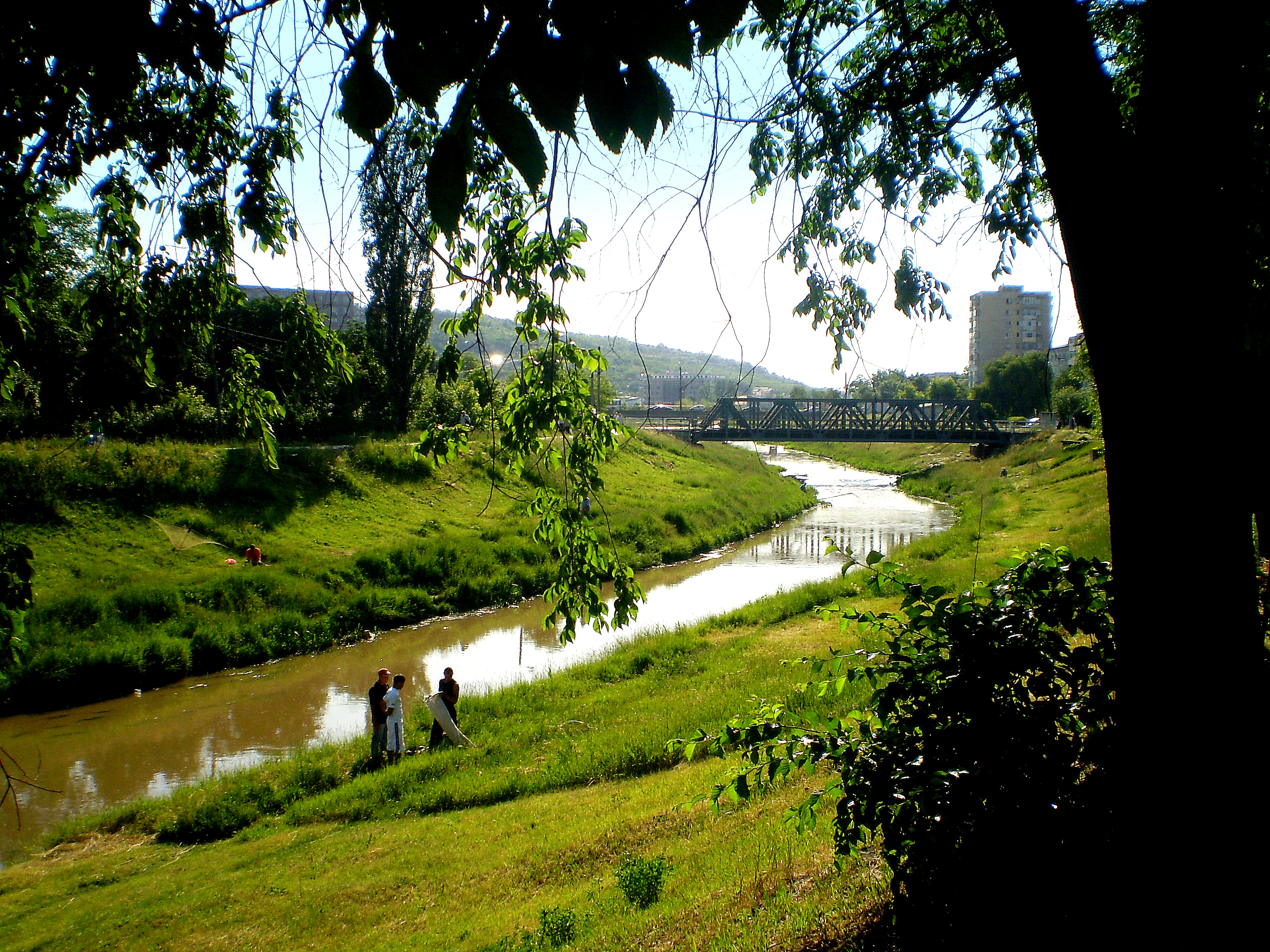
- The Bahlui in Iași

- Location within Romania

Location
- Country: Romania
- Counties: Botoșani, Iași
- Towns: Hârlău, Iași

Physical characteristics
- Source: Tudora
  - elevation: 500 m (1,600 ft)
- Mouth: Jijia
  - location: Tomești
  - coordinates: 47°7′45″N 27°44′13″E
- Length: 119 km (74 mi)
- Basin size: 1,967 km^{2} (759 sq mi)
- Discharge
  - location: Mouth
  - average: 4.88 m^{3}/s (172 cu ft/s)
  - maximum: 480 m3/s

Basin features
- Progression: Jijia→ Prut→ Danube→ Black Sea

The Bahlui is the largest river of the city of Iași, in eastern Romania. It is a right tributary of the river Jijia. Its name is derived from Cuman and it means "muddy river". The Bahlui has a length of 119 km and a catchment area of 1967 km^{2}. The average discharge is about 4.88 m^{3}/s.

Its spring is located at an altitude of 500 metres in the Tudora Comune, Botoșani County, in the eastern part of Suceava Plateau. It flows through the Jijia Plain, from north-west toward south-east and through the cities of Hârlău (formerly named after the river: Târgul Bahluiului) and Iași. It flows into the Jijia in Tomești, east of Iași. The quality of its waters is rather low, due to spills of industrial plants, especially in Iași. The Pârcovaci and Tansa-Belcești reservoirs are located on the river Bahlui.

== Tributaries ==
The following rivers are tributaries to the river Bahlui (from source to mouth):

- Left: Bahluiul Mic, Vulpoiul, Gurguiata, Lungul, Durușca, Totoești, Hoisești, Ileana, Bogonos, Lupul, Rediu, Cacaina, Ciric, Chirița, Orzeni
- Right: Valea Mare, Valea Cetățuiei, Buhalnița, Măgura, Putina, Bahlueț, Voinești, Pârâul Mare, Nicolina, Vămășoaia
