= Lespezi =

- Commune
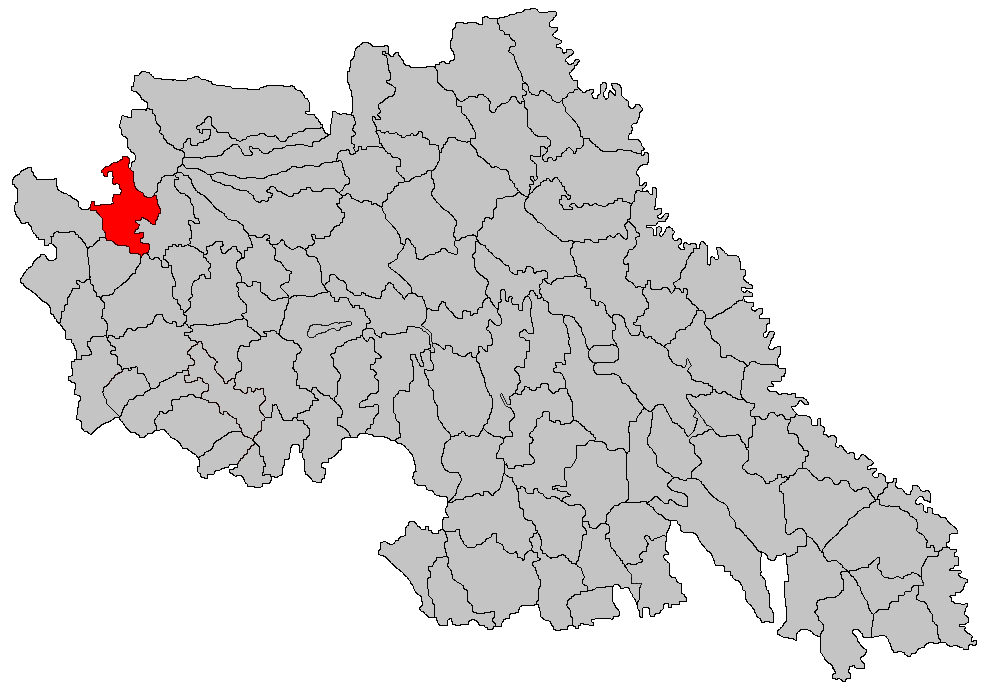
- Location in Iași County

- Location in Romania
- Coordinates: 47°22′N 26°42′E
- Country: Romania
- County: Iași
- Subdivisions: Lespezi, Buda, Bursuc-Deal, Bursuc-Vale, Dumbrava, Heci

Government
  - Mayor (2024–2028): Alexandru-Lucian Marcu (PSD)
- Area: 52.7 km^{2} (20.3 sq mi)
- Elevation: 245 m (804 ft)
- Population (2021-12-01): 4,701
  - Density: 89/km^{2} (230/sq mi)
- Time zone: EET/EEST (UTC+2/+3)
- Postal code: 707270
- Area code: +(40) x32
- Vehicle reg.: IS
- Website: www.primarialespezi.ro

Lespezi is a commune in Iași County, Western Moldavia, Romania. It is composed of six villages: Buda, Bursuc-Deal, Bursuc-Vale, Dumbrava, Heci and Lespezi.
