= Vârfuri =

- Commune
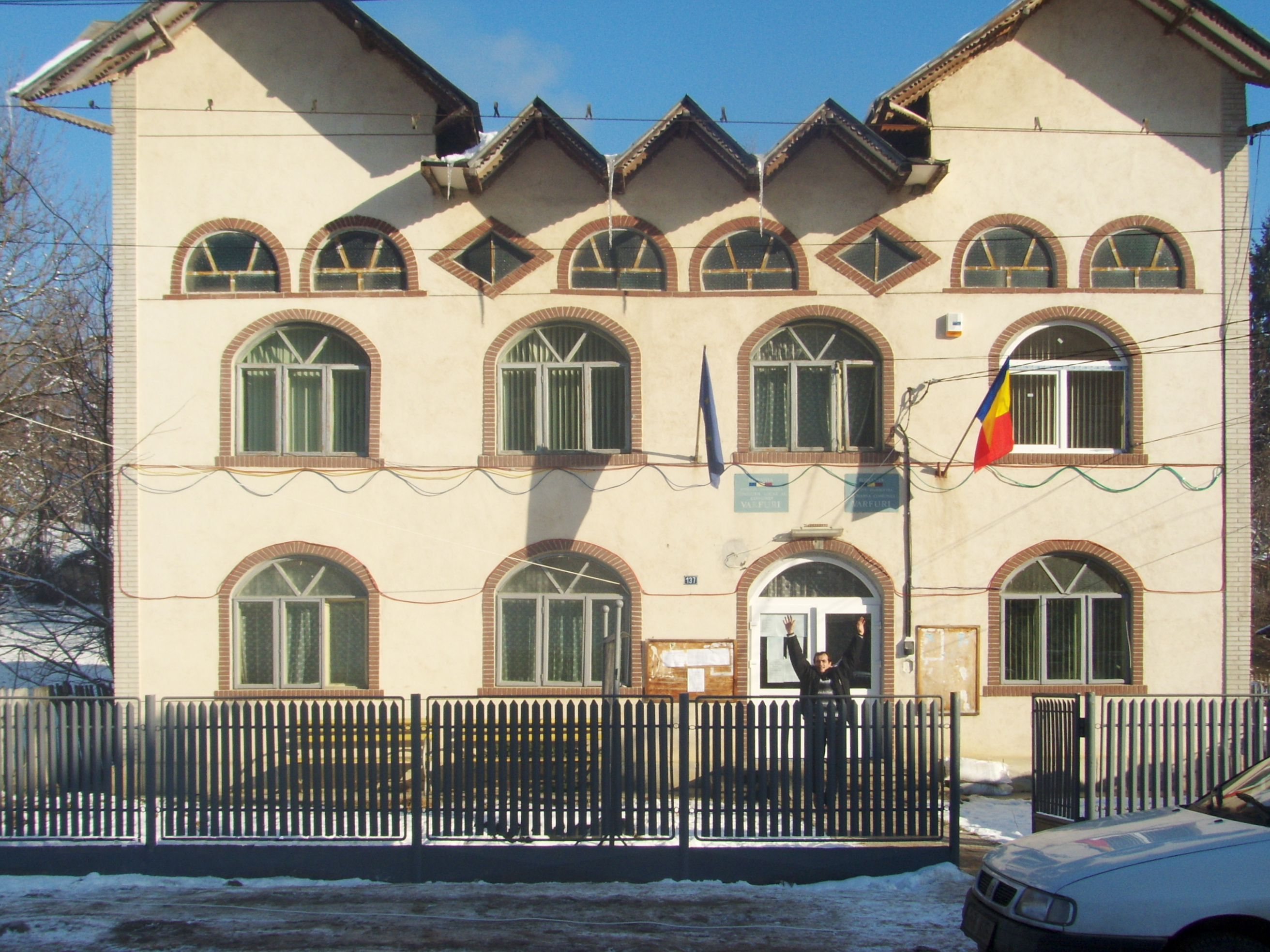
- Vârfuri town hall

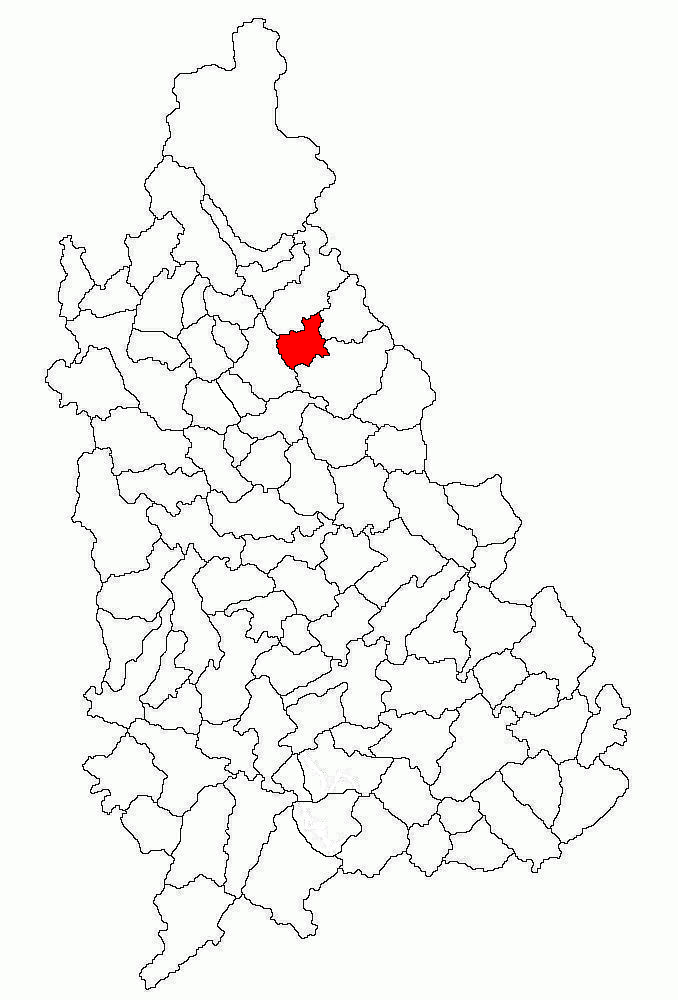
- Location in Dâmbovița County

- Location in Romania
- Coordinates: 45°6′N 25°31′E
- Country: Romania
- County: Dâmbovița

Government
  - Mayor (2020–2024): Răzvan Bănaru (PRO)
- Area: 25 km^{2} (9.7 sq mi)
- Elevation: 485 m (1,591 ft)
- Population (2021-12-01): 1,742
  - Density: 70/km^{2} (180/sq mi)
- Time zone: UTC+02:00 (EET)
  - Summer (DST): UTC+03:00 (EEST)
- Postal code: 137505
- Area code: +(40) 245
- Vehicle reg.: DB
- Website: www.primaria-varfuri.ro

Vârfuri is a commune in Dâmbovița County, Muntenia, Romania, with a population of 1,842 people. It is composed of seven villages: Cârlănești, Cojoiu, Merișoru, Stătești, Șuvița, Ulmetu, and Vârfuri. It is located outside the town of Pucioasa.

Historical population
Year	Pop.	±%
2002	2,107	—
2011	1,842	−12.6%
2021	1,742	−5.4%
Source: Census data

== History ==
In the years right around 1800, the commune's village was called Vârfu, a name that emerged from a census of Dâmbovița County, carried out in 1810 and which states "Vârfu village has 45 houses, 60 men and 82 women".

Then, the Vârfu name turned into Vârfuri. This name was mentioned in the "List of Candidates' Rights and Buildings", and this name kept. In some documents found in the State Archives – Prefect Fund as: "Rural Reform in 1864", "General Budget 1919–1920", the name of the village is "Vârfuri". The name "Vârfuri" is also mentioned in the "Geography of Dâmbovița County" in 1887, which describes the commune as follows:

"Leaving the commune Șerbănești-Podurile to the east on the communal road and passing Bisididel through Diaconești village after passing a few hills, we reach the Vârfuri village consisting of six small villages: Vârfuri, Valea-Rea, Cojoiu, Cîrlănești, Strâmbu, and Șuvița with a population of 1,300 inhabitants. There is a church and a school in this village and the land produces plums and a lot of wood. The commune is part of the valleys and part of the hills and rivulets such as Valea Rea and Strâmbu, as well as the peaks of Prăvăcioru, Fusaru, Miercanu, Ulmetul, and Băloiu.

At the end of the 19th century, the Vârfurile commune was part of the Ialomița-Dâmbovița lands of Dâmbovița County and it consisted of Peflori, Valea Rea, Cojoiu, Carlănești, Strâmbu, and Șuvița, with 1,300 inhabitants. A church and a school functioned in the commune.

In 1925, the Socec Yearbook added to the commune the village of Stătești, a commune with 2,531 inhabitants and assigned to the Pucioasa lands of the same county. In 1931, the village was composed of Cârlănești, Cojoiu, Stătești, Șuvița, Valea Rea, and Vârfuri villages.

In 1950, the commune passed under the administration of the Pucioasa raion of Prahova Region and then (after 1952) the Târgoviște raion in the Ploiești Region. In 1964, the Strâmbu village was named Ulmetu, and the village of Valea Rea was renamed Merișoru. In 1968, the commune returned to the re-established Dâmbovița County.
