= Holboca =

- Commune
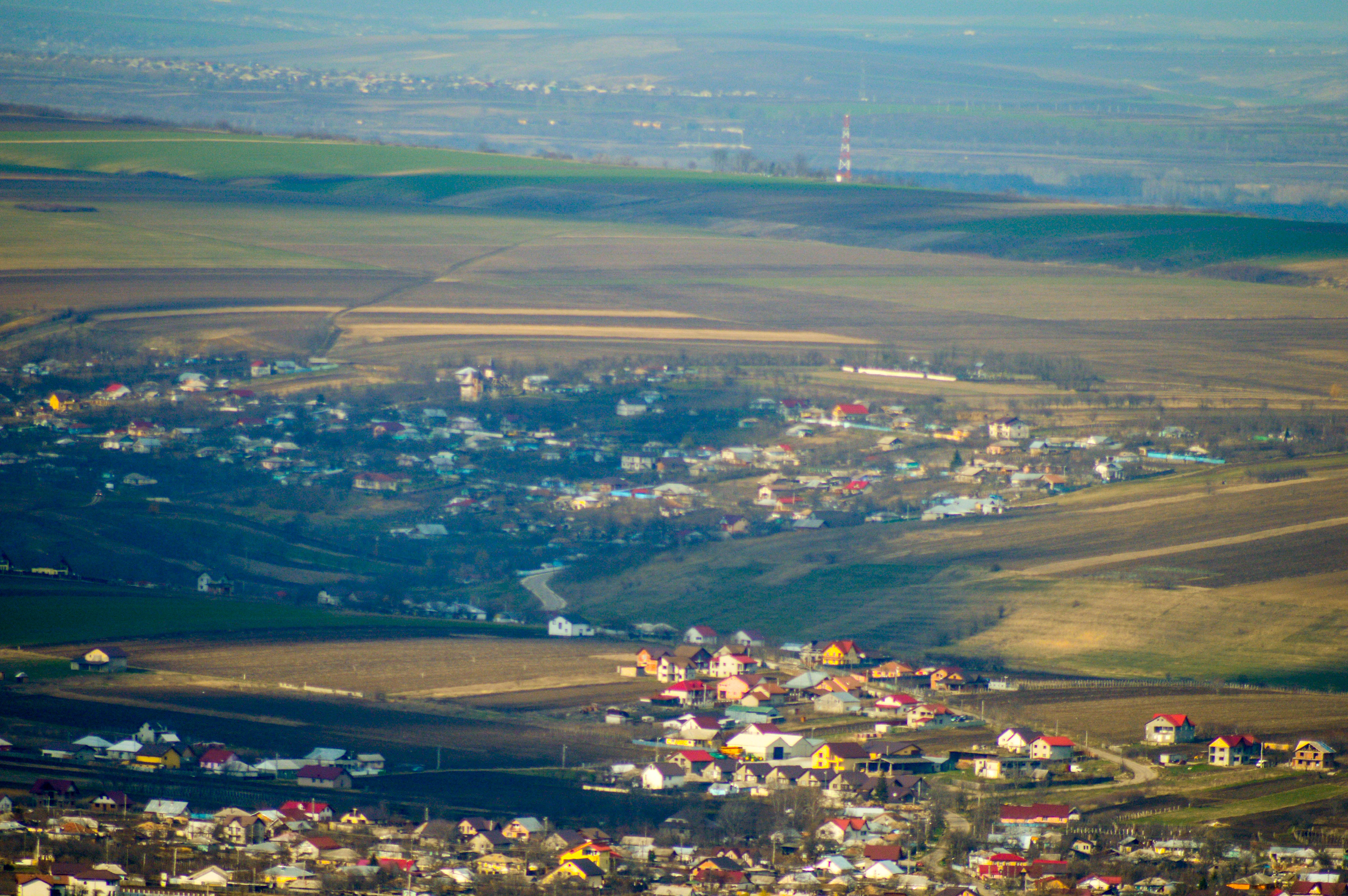

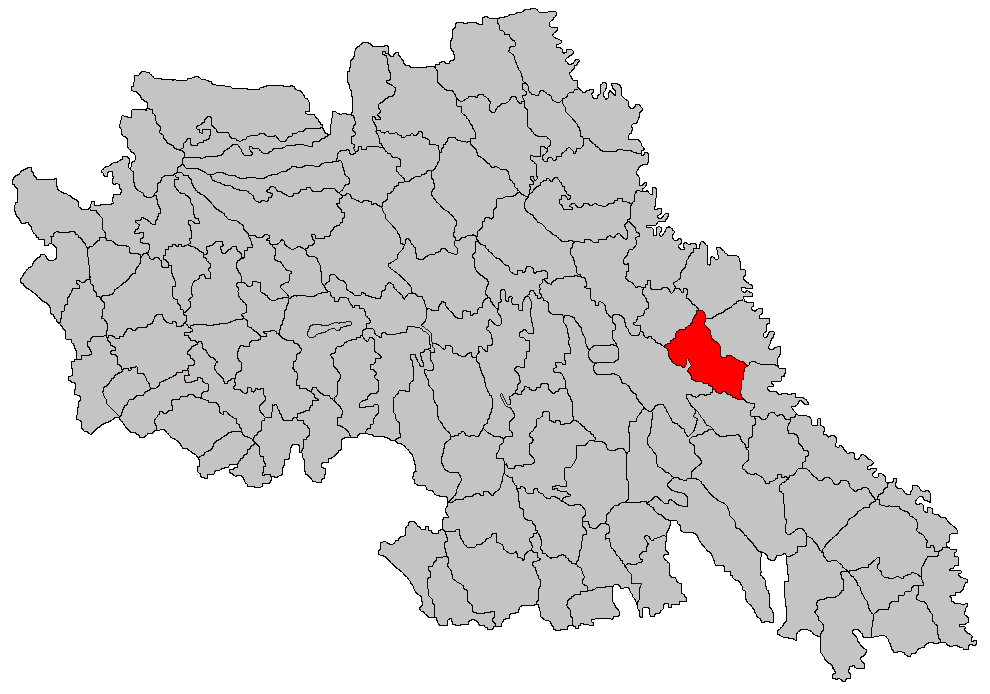
- Location in Iași County

- Location in Romania
- Coordinates: 47°9′N 27°42′E
- Country: Romania
- County: Iași

Government
  - Mayor (2020–2024): Neculai-Aurel Pamfil (PNL)
- Area: 50.04 km^{2} (19.32 sq mi)
- Elevation: 52 m (171 ft)
- Population (2021-12-01): 13,697
  - Density: 273.7/km^{2} (708.9/sq mi)
- Time zone: UTC+02:00 (EET)
  - Summer (DST): UTC+03:00 (EEST)
- Postal code: 707250
- Area code: +(40) 232
- Vehicle reg.: IS
- Website: www.comunaholboca.ro

Holboca is a commune in Iași County, Western Moldavia, Romania, part of the Iași metropolitan area. It is composed of seven villages: Cristești, Dancu, Holboca, Orzeni, Rusenii Noi, Rusenii Vechi, and Valea Lungă.

== Natives ==
- Ion Negrescu (1893–1977), politician, Mayor of Chișinău for 1928 to 1931
