= Budeasa =

- Commune
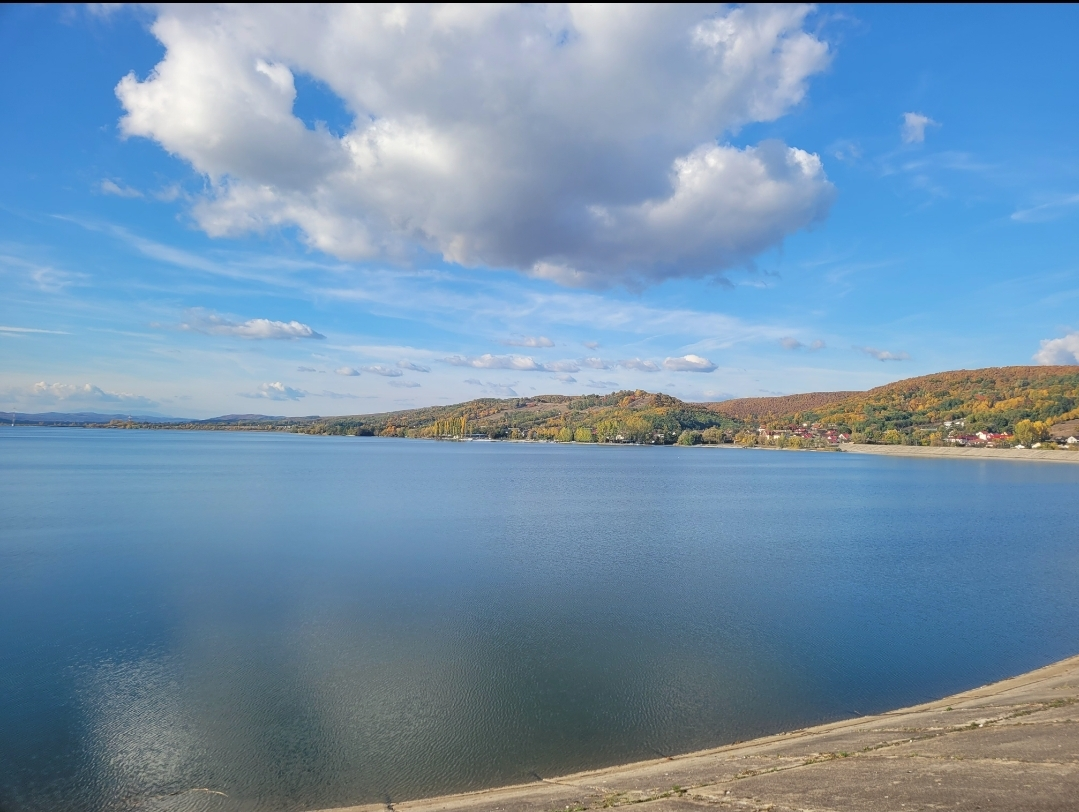
- The Budeasa Reservoir on the river Argeș

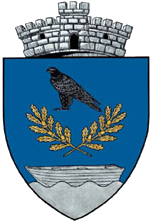
- Coat of arms

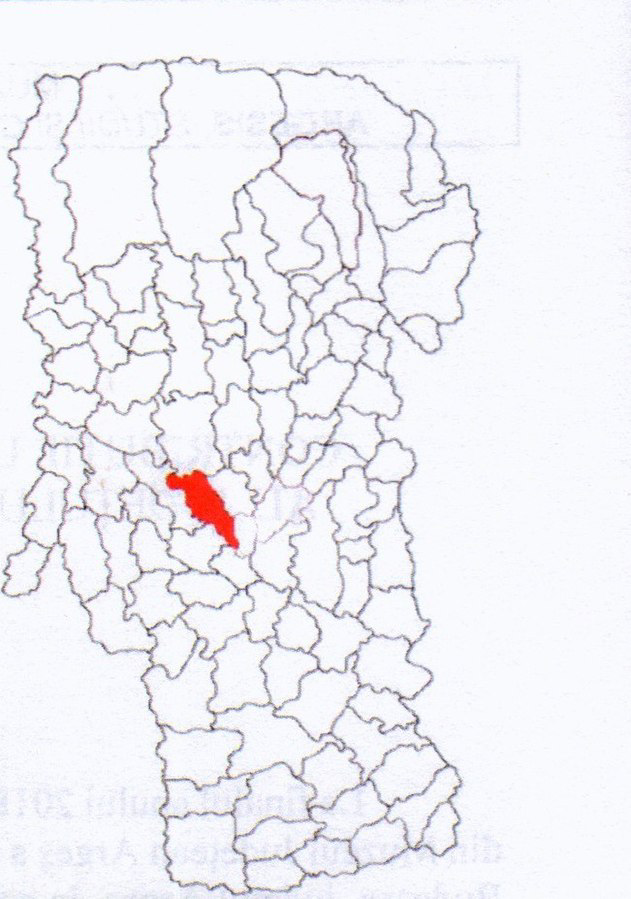
- Location in Argeș County

- Location in Romania
- Coordinates: 45°1′N 24°51′E
- Country: Romania
- County: Argeș

Government
  - Mayor (2024–2028): Nicolae Mihail Rachieru (PSD)
- Area: 43 km^{2} (17 sq mi)
- Elevation: 461 m (1,512 ft)
- Highest elevation: 497 m (1,631 ft)
- Lowest elevation: 290 m (950 ft)
- Population (2021-12-01): 4,201
  - Density: 98/km^{2} (250/sq mi)
- Time zone: UTC+02:00 (EET)
  - Summer (DST): UTC+03:00 (EEST)
- Postal code: 117156
- Area code: +(40) 0248
- Vehicle reg.: AG
- Website: comunabudeasa.ro

Budeasa is a commune in Argeș County, Muntenia, Romania. It is composed of six villages: Budeasa Mare (the commune centre), Budeasa Mică, Calotești, Gălășești, Rogojina, and Valea Mărului.

Historical population
Year	Pop.	±%
2002	3,838	—
2011	4,004	+4.3%
2021	4,201	+4.9%
Source: Census data

== Natives ==
- Alexandru Mirodan (1927–2010), writer
- Nicu Vladimir (1950–1995), singer
