= Mărgineni, Neamț =

Mărgineni
- Commune
- Location in Neamț County

- Location in Romania
- Coordinates: 46°54′N 26°39′E
- Country: Romania
- County: Neamț
- Subdivisions: Mărgineni, Hârțești, Hoisești, Itrinești

Government
  - Mayor (2024–2028): Robert-Gabriel Mitrea (PNL)
- Area: 59.83 km^{2} (23.10 sq mi)
- Elevation: 378 m (1,240 ft)
- Population (2021-12-01): 2,940
  - Density: 49.1/km^{2} (127/sq mi)
- Time zone: UTC+02:00 (EET)
  - Summer (DST): UTC+03:00 (EEST)
- Postal code: 617270
- Area code: +40 x33
- Vehicle reg.: NT
- Website: primariamargineni.ro

Mărgineni is a commune in Neamț County, Western Moldavia, Romania. It is composed of four villages: Hârțești, Hoisești, Itrinești, and Mărgineni.

Historical population
Year	Pop.	±%
1992	4,091	—
2002	4,044	−1.1%
2011	3,253	−19.6%
2021	2,940	−9.6%
Source: Census data
