= Erbiceni =

- Commune
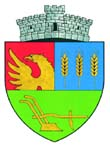
- Coat of arms

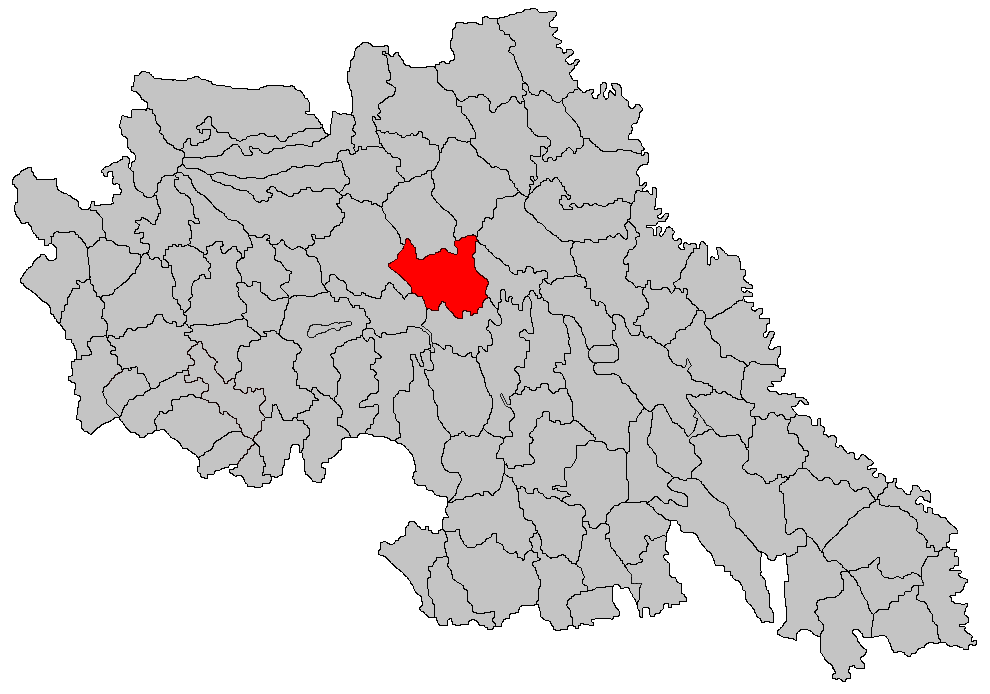
- Location in Iași County

- Location in Romania
- Coordinates: 47°16′N 27°14′E
- Country: Romania
- County: Iași
- Subdivisions: Erbiceni, Bârlești, Spinoasa, Sprânceana, Totoești

Government
  - Mayor (2024–2028): Răzvan-Gabriel Bulancea (PNL)
- Area: 79.01 km^{2} (30.51 sq mi)
- Elevation: 73 m (240 ft)
- Population (2021-12-01): 5,154
  - Density: 65/km^{2} (170/sq mi)
- Time zone: EET/EEST (UTC+2/+3)
- Postal code: 707190
- Area code: +40 x32
- Vehicle reg.: IS
- Website: www.comunaerbiceni.ro

Erbiceni is a commune in Iași County, Western Moldavia, Romania. It is composed of five villages: Bârlești, Erbiceni, Spinoasa, Sprânceana and Totoești.

== Natives ==
- Constantin Erbiceanu
- Marius Simionescu
