= Ceplenița =

- Commune
- The Cantacuzino-Pașcanu mansion in Ceplenița during the interwar period

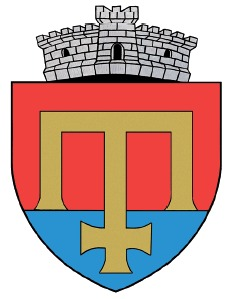
- Coat of arms

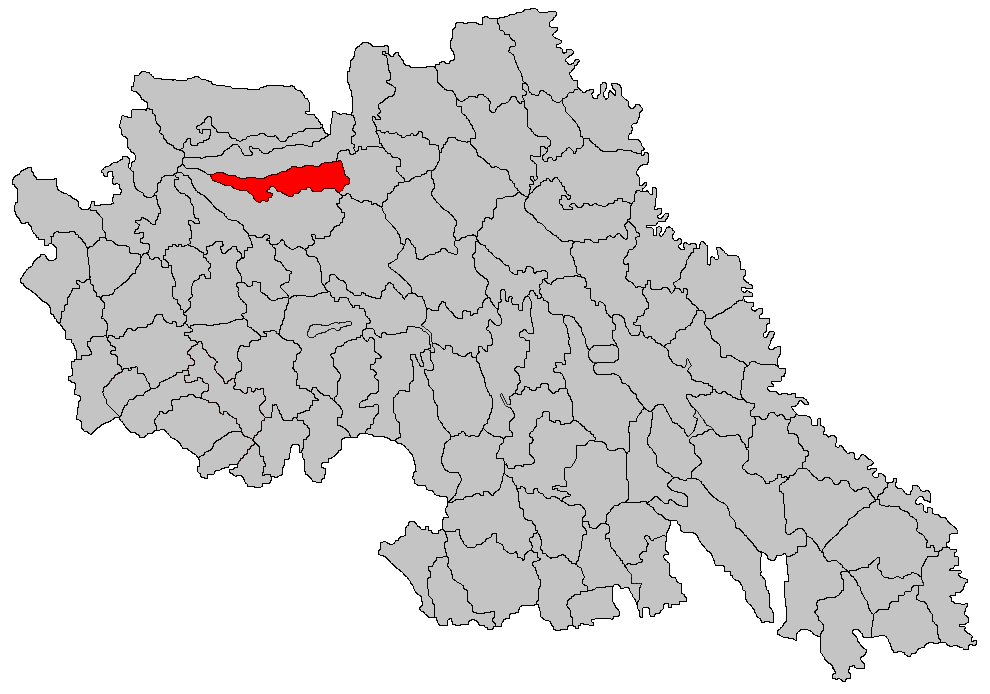
- Location in Iași County

- Location in Romania
- Coordinates: 47°23′N 27°1′E
- Country: Romania
- County: Iași

Government
  - Mayor (2020–2024): Dumitru Laiu (PNL)
- Area: 45.2 km^{2} (17.5 sq mi)
- Elevation: 115 m (377 ft)
- Population (2021-12-01): 3,560
  - Density: 78.8/km^{2} (204/sq mi)
- Time zone: UTC+02:00 (EET)
  - Summer (DST): UTC+03:00 (EEST)
- Postal code: 707070
- Area code: +(40) 232
- Vehicle reg.: IS
- Website: primariaceplenita.ro

Ceplenița is a commune in Iași County, Western Moldavia, Romania. It is composed of four villages: Buhalnița, Ceplenița, Poiana Mărului, and Zlodica.

The commune is located in the northwestern part of the county, 9.3 km (5.8 mi) from Hârlău town.
