= Ibăneasa =

River in Romania

- Location within Romania

Location
- Country: Romania
- Counties: Botoșani County

Physical characteristics
- Mouth: Jijia
  - location: Borzești
  - coordinates: 47.9050°N 26.7585°E
- Length: 43 km (27 mi)
- Basin size: 189 km^{2} (73 sq mi)
- Discharge
  - location: *
  - minimum: 0.015 m^{3}/s (0.53 cu ft/s)
  - maximum: 150.0 m^{3}/s (5,300 cu ft/s)

Basin features
- Progression: Jijia→ Prut→ Danube→ Black Sea
- Tributaries
  - left: Tricova, Grivița
  - right: Ghilăuca

The Ibăneasa is a left tributary of the river Jijia in Romania. It discharges into the Jijia in Borzești. It flows through the villages Ibănești, Dragalina, George Enescu, Dumeni, Cordăreni, Ibăneasa and Borzești. Its length is 43 km (27 mi) and its basin size is 189 km^{2} (73 sq mi).
