= Dimitrie Ralet =

Moldavian politician and Romanian-language poet

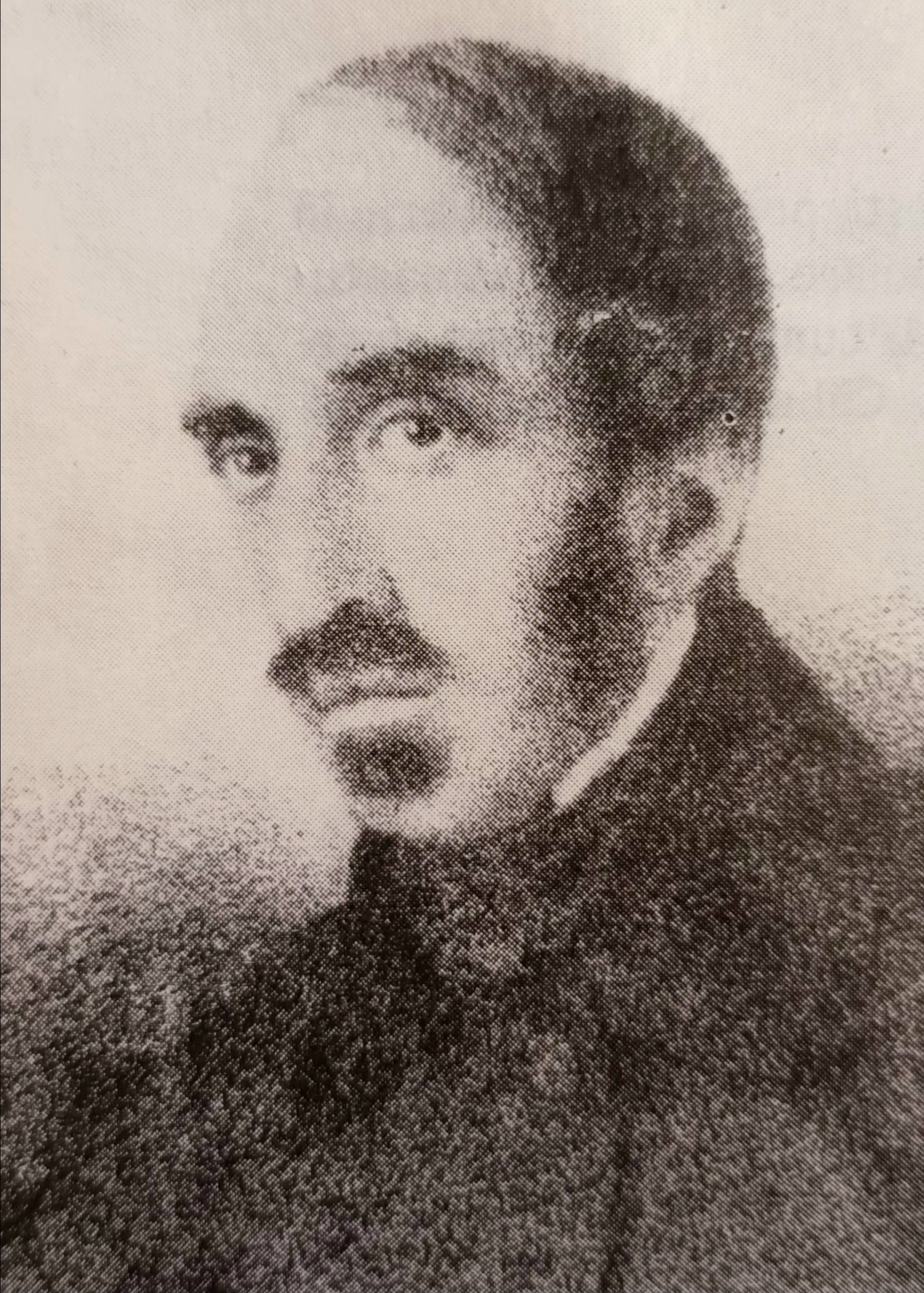
- Ralet in D. I. Cerbureanu's 1856 print
- Born: c. 1816; Bukovina District, Austrian Empire, or Istanbul, Ottoman Empire
- Died: 25 October 1858 (aged 40–43); Botoșani or Bucecea, Moldavia
- Occupations: Politician; judge; diplomat; translator; landowner
- Writing career
- Period: 1837–1859
- Genres: Essay; sketch story; satire; autobiography; fable; aphorism; travel literature; lyric poetry; prose poem; pastiche; comedy of manners; dramatic verse
- Literary movement: Romanticism

Dimitrie Ralet (also rendered as Rallet, Ralett, Ralleti or Raletu; Cyrillic: Дімітріє Ралєт, Раллєтȣ, or Раллєтi; c. 1816 – 25 October 1858) was a Moldavian political figure and celebrated contributor to Romanian literature. Belonging to the upper strata of boyardom, he was of Phanariote and Aromanian descent, and may not have been born in Moldavia; his family history, as well as the circumstances of his birth and early life, remain mysterious and controversial. His father, the Spatharios Alexandru Ralet, was a judge in the northern Moldavian city of Botoșani, and the owner of Bucecea town. Possibly educated abroad, and already a polyglot in his twenties, Dimitrie took over his father's job at the tribunal in 1841—but only served briefly, and with interruptions. He first published as a translator in 1837, before making his actual debut in 1840, with short essays in social satire that evidenced a deep familiarity with 18th-century French literature. Ralet was an introspective and self-deprecating adherent of Romanticism, whose youthful contributions helped establish a deadpan register in modern Romanian humor.

Though created an Aga by the conservative Prince Mihail Sturdza, Ralet embraced rebellious liberalism, endeavoring to outlaw slavery, and exposing Sturdza as the ringleader of a corrupt boyar clique. He arrived at espousing Romanian nationalism, whose immediate agenda was the political unification of Moldavia and Wallachia. Rallying with the National Party in the failed uprising of 1848, he apparently escaped punishment, and networked with the other anti-Sturdzaists from his home in Botoșani. Ralet joined a National-Party cabinet formed by Prince Grigore Alexandru Ghica in 1849, when he contributed to the abolition of slavery, the introduction of educational reforms, and the first steps toward the confiscation of monastery estates. During the Crimean War, as Ghica's diplomat, he advanced points of policy which moved Moldavia closer to the Western powers, and away from her status as a tributary state of the Ottoman Empire. His and Costache Negri's attempt to litigate on the monasteries issue took them on an extended trip to Istanbul.

Ralet was a propagandist for the unionist platform ahead of legislative election in July 1857, opposing the conservative-separatist caucus formed around Caimacami Teodor Balș and Nicolae Vogoride. He exposed Vogoride's discrimination and electoral fraud to international attention, being largely responsible for repeat elections in September. He was subsequently a distinguished figure in the Ad-hoc Divan of Iași, where, as a moderate, he helped recruit conservatives for the unionist cause. His final literary works include comedic plays which were widely acclaimed, including by modern critics, his own version of Hora Unirii, as well as a travelogue of his oriental journey—one of the first such texts by a Moldavian, and among the masterpieces of the genre in its Romanian context. Ralet spent some of his final months in French Empire, trying to obtain support for the union, and also looking after his aggravated tuberculosis. He died upon his return, without managing to see the establishment the United Principalities, occurring just months later.

== Biography ==
=== Early life and debut ===
One version of the Rallet arms, as rendered by Emanoil Hagi-Moscu in 1918

Ralet's father was Alexandru or Alecu Ralet, a Spatharios of Botoșani, and also the inaugural chairman of that city's tribunal. Moldavia and neighboring Wallachia (the Danubian Principalities) were at the time vassals and tributaries of the Ottoman Empire; under this regime, they had received a number of Greek settlers, including the Rallet family. Genealogist Octav-George Lecca believes that they formed a distinct branch of the Rallis, and were thus descendants of Byzantine aristocracy; this interpretation is disputed by historian Gheorghe Sibechi, who notes that the original Rallis and another Rallet family had their own representatives in the Principalities, and did not seem to be claimed as relatives by Alexandru's kin. Research initiated by literary scholar Mircea Anghelescu, and completed by historian Andrei Pippidi, points to a close Rallis–Rallet connection. Pippidi hypothesizes that Dimitrie was the great-grandson of Dragoman Christophoros Rallis, and the nephew of Isaac Ralet, who held high-ranking positions in Wallachia in the 1820s. Alexandru's father or elder brother, also called Dimitrie, had arrived to Moldavia within a Phanariote retinue. This Dimitrie accompanied Prince Alexander Ypsilantis on his European trips during the Russian occupation of 1788, and adopted some staples of Westernization—including a coat of arms that displayed Noah's Ark and a self-styling as "count".

According to the boyar genealogist Constantin Sion, Dimitrie Sr was originally a scribe of Alexander Mourouzis, in the 1790s, before being made Vornic under Scarlat Callimachi, and calling Alexandru into the country, to join him. Little is known about the Dimitrie Jr's earliest years, including the exact date of his birth—with secondary and tertiary sources suggesting "probably 1816", but also 1815 and 1817. The writer was born from Alexandru's marriage to Maria (also known as Marghioala), the daughter of baron Teodor (Tudori) von Mustață, a wealthy merchant from Bukovina District (a former part of Moldavia, then under the Austrian Empire). This side of the family had recent origins among the Aromanians, an Eastern Romance-speaking population that Dimitrie Jr knew as Tsintsari. The Mustațăs had been received into the Austrian nobility in 1794, but maintained links with the Epirus (Ioannina Eyalet), with close relatives still living in Tsepelovo during the 1830s.

An 1825 record provided by the Austrian authorities in Sadagora gives Alexandru's citizenship as Venetian, while listing "Moldavia" for all his wife and children. A funeral oration by Moldavian Metropolitan Neofit Scriban recounted that Dimitrie Jr had been "born a Moldo-Romanian", though such verdicts may be misleading: Pippidi notes the paradox that, for all his embrace of local interests, the writer "was not even born in Moldavia." Scholar Ionel Bejenaru sees him as a Bukovinan by birth, while he notes that identifying the exact place is the subject of much controversy. Sion contends that all of Alexandru's "sons and daughters" were natives of Istanbul, the Ottoman capital, and only arrived in Botoșani in 1819. Sibechi describes this claim as "hardly verifiable", though he acknowledges its treatment as fact by various authors, especially since, in his later life, Dimitrie was legally classified as a non-citizen. He also notes that Dimitrie was indeed the oldest of four children—he had a brother, Iancu, as well as two sisters, Catinca and Elencu. Another Iancu, who was the writer's paternal cousin, was a Spatharios in 1822, and lived to 1854.

The Ralets were admitted into the upper strata of the Moldavian boyardom, making Dimitrie Jr the recipient of an elite education, which began with his tutoring at home. Following her father's death in 1825, Maria inherited the then-Bukovinan hamlet of Nicșeni, the estate of Bucecea in Moldavia-proper, and several houses in Botoșani; Bucecea was assigned to her husband, and, in January 1828, was elevated by Prince Ioan Sturdza into a Moldavian market town. As a child, Dimitrie lived for a while in that locality, as well as in Botoșani and Nicșeni. Anghelescu emphasizes young Ralet's deep familiarity with classical Moldavian prose and poetry, noting that his literature was one of "continuity" with that of Dosoftei and Dimitrie Cantemir. He picked up both Greek and French by conversing with his immediate relatives; he later learned German (and was thus regarded as Moldavia's resident expert on German culture), Latin, as well as rudiments of Italian, English, and Russian. He reportedly completed his studies in Austrian Poland. Some biographies report that he also took extended study trips in the German Confederation and the Kingdom of France, or more generally "abroad".

Ralet's first published work was a short volume of translations from Alphonse de Lamartine, appearing in 1837 as Plăcerea sâmțirei. Its title, which would now commonly translate to "Pleasure of the Senses", was explained in 1980 by Pippidi as "Pleasures of Sensibility". It was followed in 1840 by the collection Scrieri ("Writings"). Modern academics are divided over the latter's artistic worth: Paul Cornea sees it as "interesting", "surprising in its observational finesse", and of "astounding modernity", being overall worthy of the French models it emulates (François de La Rochefoucauld, Luc de Vauvenargues, Nicolas Chamfort); in contrast, Mihai Zamfir notes it as "rather dull and of little significance." Another positive verdict is provided by literary historian Maria Frunză, who argues that Scrieri points to a reader of the 18th-century Philosophes, himself endowed with "sharp observational skill, fine intelligence, and a penchant for satire." In his overview of Romanian literature, Nicolae Manolescu deems Ralet "one of the most talented romantic prose writers", his Scrieri being readable, "with only a few wrinkles", by 21st-century standards. He also finds Ralet to be a "memorable exception", as one of the few introspective, self-deprecating, Romanian romantics, and a "master of litotes".

=== Embracing liberalism ===
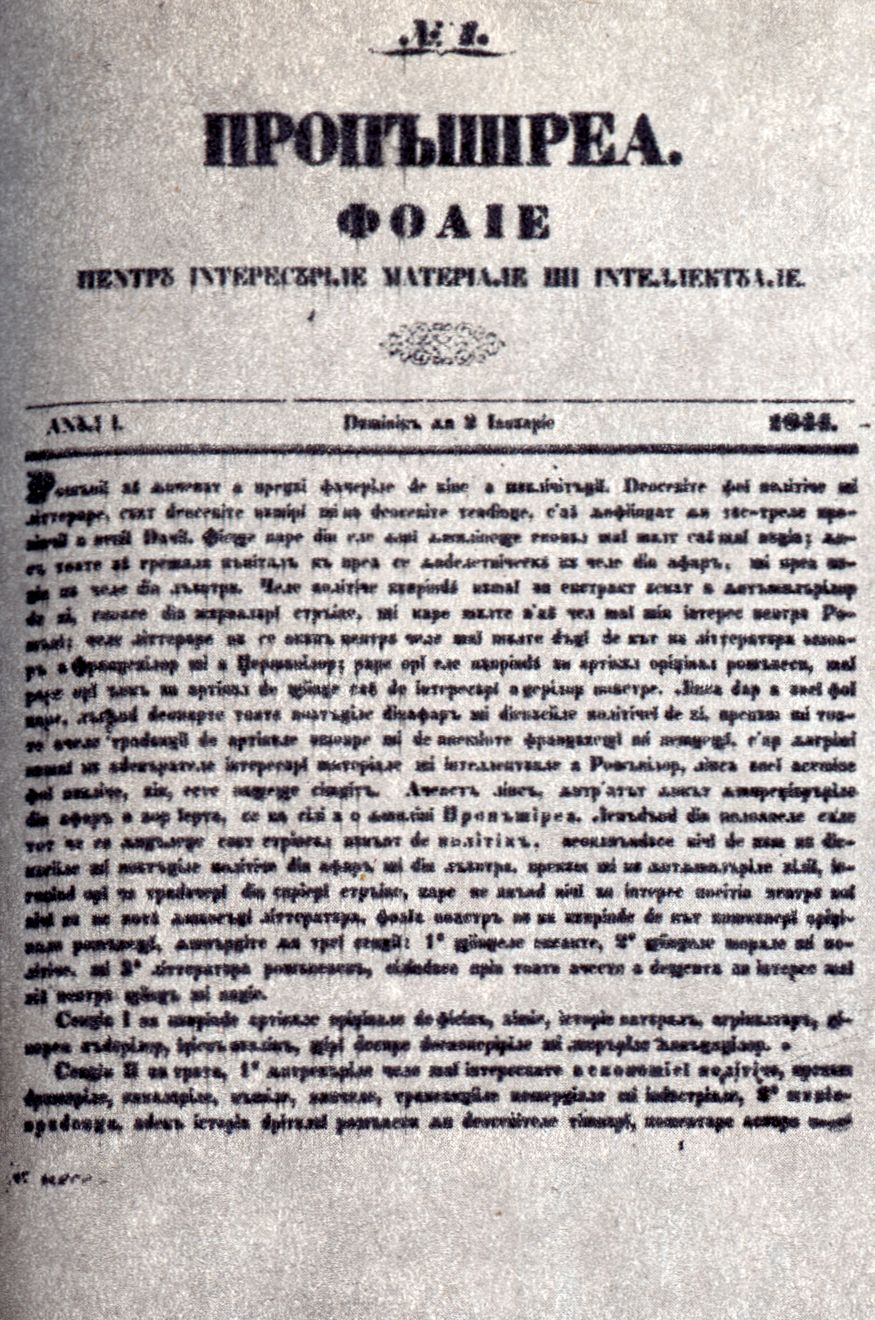
Front page of Propășirea, January 1844

From about 1843, the young man frequently lodged with boyar Costache Negri at Mânjina, where they also networked with other figures of the emerging liberal movement—including Vasile Alecsandri, Manolache Epureanu, Mihail Kogălniceanu, Constantin Negruzzi, Alecu Russo, and Costache Rolla. Ralet was also active in Iași, the Moldavian capital; from 1844, he rented a room in Costachi Sturdza's townhouse, which later also hosted the Naturalists' Society museum. In parallel, from 1841, Ralet was president of the Botoșani tribunal. According to Sion, he owed this appointment, as well as his status as a civilian officer, or Aga, to his father being a political client of the new Prince, Mihail Sturdza. Ralet took this title on 8 May 1842, almost exactly three years before Alexandru's death.

Ralet Jr only served as judge to 1843 or 1844, and again in 1847–1848, since he felt that he did not have a calling. The liberal caucus generally opposed Sturdza and the Regulamentul Organic constitution. As an exponent of this trend, Ralet favored the abolition of slave-owning practices, which had kept the Romani community in a subservient position. In January 1844, when he agreed to a partial manumission of the Romanies, Sturdza received homages from a "deputation of the youths", which comprised Ralet, Rolla, and Petre Mavrogheni. Between his two terms at the tribunal, the Aga sat on a committee which supervised the construction of a Botoșani hospital. In November 1846, he pledged to donate part of his revenue, as well as one of his own estates, for that project.

Ralet experimented with the sketch-story genre, with fragments published in Bogdan Petriceicu Hasdeu's Propășirea magazine (1844). Among the later scholars, Barbu Lăzăreanu considered them samples of a "philosophical mindset" that had eluded his peers, making Ralet a Moldavian answer to Joseph Joubert. They are consciously modeled on literary portraits, or "physiognomies", introduced in Romanian writing by Constantin Negruzzi, and later developed by Kogălniceanu. Manolescu proposes that Ralet copied this template, but explored new grounds in Romanian humor, reinventing physiognomies as a "burlesque" form of entertainment (while also remaining a "sarcastic moralist" with hints of Voltaire's wit, his "cruelty" presented in "the most neutral tone"). According to Anghelescu, Ralet had "remarkable ease of expression" in presenting the various personality types of a Westernizing society, "characterized with apparent bonhomie in poses that are actually rooted in a mordant ridicule." He sees the satirist as announcing the humorous or polemical essays of Hasdeu and Alexandru Macedonski; like Hasdeu, Ralet spent considerable time in mocking intellectuals who aspired to artificially re-Latinize the Romanian language.

The Propășirea works include some frontal attacks on the boyars' take on modernization, which had resulted in their "doing their best not to stay Romanian"; "the harnesses [they use] are Russian, the saddles English, the beards and cigars Spanish, the language, the marriages, the fashions are all French." Ralet's moderating take on Westernization was also illustrated by fragments which poke fun at Western European travelers to Iași—though Ralet also believed, genuinely so, that boyars who had renounced their işlic headgear in favor of regular hats had also liberated their thinking. As Frunză notes, the humorous aspects of such prose mostly serve to highlight "the decay of contemporary feudal society, with its luxuries, its cosmopolitan habits, and its duplicitous conventionality." She is more reserved toward Ralet as an author of fables, since these were "original, but sometimes labored". Zamfir similarly questions the value of Ralet's debut verse, which appeared in Albina Românească and Foaie pentru Minte, Inimă și Literatură in various installments (1841–1844). He reserves some praise for Ralet's pioneering samples of autobiography, as well as for the prose poem O primăvară ca toate ("A Spring Just Like Any Other").

The end of Ralet's tenure at the tribunal coincided with the Moldavian Revolution of 1848, of which he was a prominent supporter—having by then been identified as a figure of importance in the National Party. Ralet was involved in the conspiratorial meetings of the Botoșani boyars, and established direct links with Polish emigrants, being contacted by Michał Czajkowski. A memoir by fellow revolutionist Kogălniceanu identifies Ralet as the author of propaganda verse, circulating in leaflets and later bound together as Plutarcul Moldovei ("Moldavia's Own Plutarch"). As Frunză notes, its significance is primarily as a historical document. Its eight cycles featured detailed attacks on the conservative Prince Sturdza, describing all forms of political corruption benefiting the Sturdza family and the most rapacious boyars. One fragment contained specific allegations against the land-grabbing Postelnic Nicolae Millo; another one mocked Toderică Ghica, who had turned firefighters on the angry crowds of Bacău. Manolescu retains a "startling image" in one other portrait:

Ca să arăți umilință te îmbraci cu haine rele,
Ca lupul ce-ar vrea s-ascundă a lui dinți sub altă piele,
Blând ca motanul ce trage a lui unghii sângeroase,
Îți tăinuiești răutatea cu ziceri politicoase.

Translation:

Your humility performance when you dress up like a vagrant—
Wolf with fangs under a pelt—never did it seem this flagrant.
Smooth the cat that draws its claws, bloodied ones though they may be—
You are evil, and you know it, deep inside that flattery.

=== As Ghica's minister ===
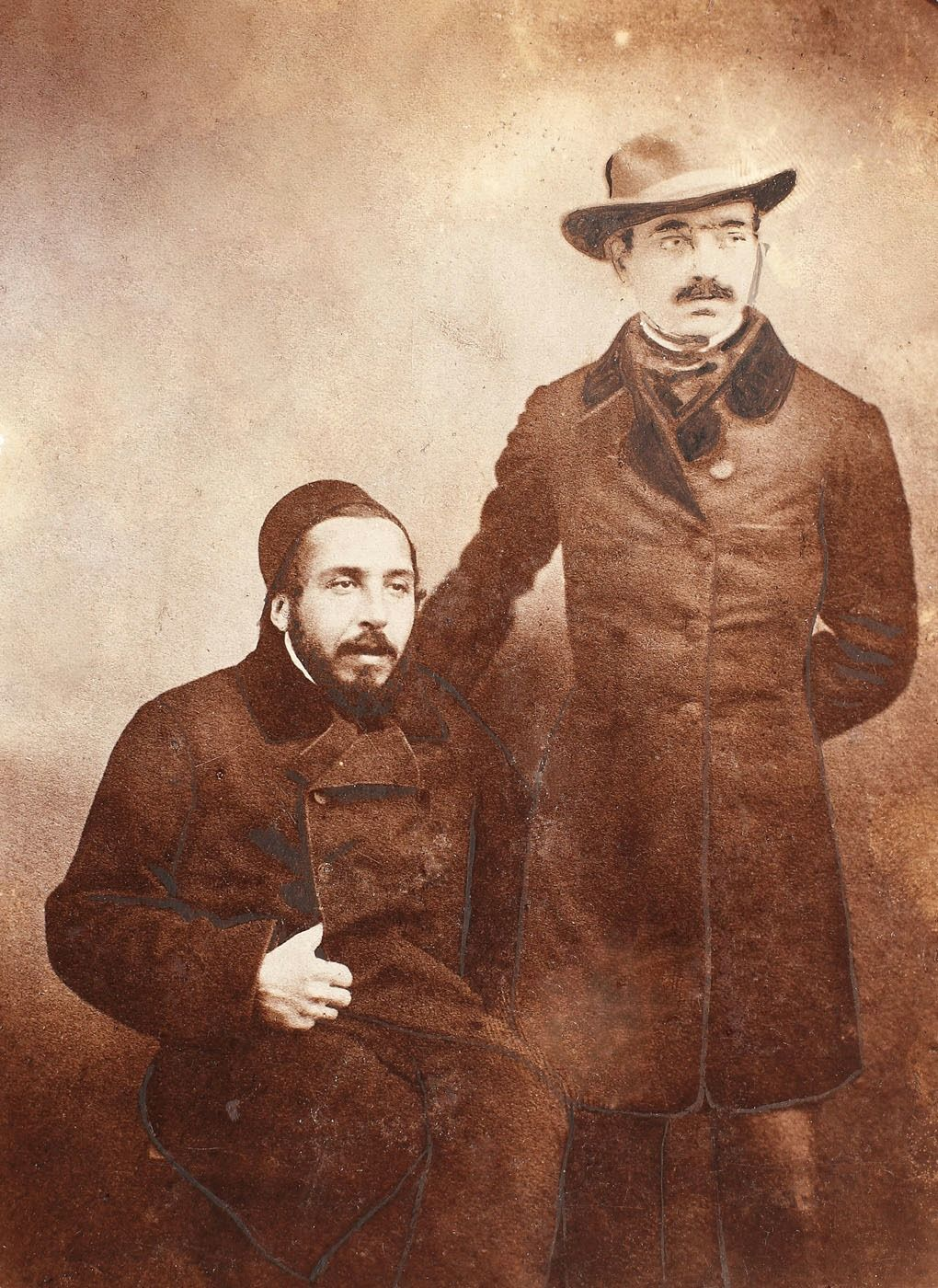
Ralet's political associates Ion Ghica (sitting) and Vasile Alecsandri, photographed in Istanbul in 1855

The revolutionary conspiracy quickly unraveled: in April 1848, the rebels met at Iași's Casimir House, where they were ambushed by the Moldavian military forces, under Mihail's heir-apparent, Grigore Sturdza. Ralet, Rolla and Alecsandri were among the few who managed to escape the encirclement by either running out the back door or jumping out the window. Various historians believe that Ralet was forced to escape additional retribution by crossing the border into Bukovina. Bejenariu credits such accounts, believing that Ralet was welcomed by the Hurmuzachi brothers, switching between their homes in Czernowitz and Czernowka; he also reconnected with other exiles, who had formed a Romanian Revolutionary Committee, and helped draft proclamations on their behalf. These readings are placed in doubt by Sibechi—since, in his letters to Czajkowski and other Polish colleagues, Ralet describes himself as living in Botoșani and Bucecea, as late as August 1848. On 13 July, he was present at Iași, helping to instigate a rally of about one thousand people, who wished to petition the Sublime Porte. He apparently could move freely into Bukovina, without being counted as an exile, since he was reliably spotted there by Iraclie Gołęmbiowski-Porumbescu; in early 1849, he also intervened with the Hurmuzachis to rescue George Bariț, a Romanian intellectual from the Principality of Transylvania, who was being detained by the Austrians in Czernowitz.

The enthronement of a liberal-minded Prince, Grigore Alexandru Ghica (who was a Botoșani native and effectively a leader of the National Party), prompted Ralet to resume his career in Moldavian politics. In June 1849, Ralet was Ghica's director of the Justice Department, with the Bukovinan community rejoicing in September that he and other revolutionaries were instilling a "beneficent spirit" in Moldavia's public affairs. He had a hands-on role in institutional modernization: from 30 November 1850, he served with Kogălniceanu, Rolla and Nicolae Șuțu on a commission to draft Moldavia's civil code, and personally authored and published its legal instrument. As Cornea reports, Ralet was universally acclaimed for his competence in that ministry; various contemporary articles in Gazeta Transilvaniei speak of him as an altruistic and incorruptible statesman, who had assimilated meritocratic values. He was also acknowledged by Sultan Abdulmejid I, who awarded him the Order of Glory (1851), and by Prince Ghica, who made him a titled Vornic (1852). A dissenting assessment was provided by Sion, who wrote off Ghica as "insane", and identified Ralet as primarily a Greek whose ascent had helped marginalize more competent Moldavians.

Ralet's activity was in any case put on hold by the Crimean War, which finally resulted in the Danubian Principalities being placed under the oversight of European powers, including the French Empire, with the Ottomans still exercising suzerainty. On 9 November 1854, Ghica resumed his reign, and Ralet was assigned Minister of Religious Affairs and Education. This investiture was discussed in a letter sent by the Austrian general Johann Baptist Coronini-Cronberg, whose troops had pacified Wallachia. According to Coronini, Ghica had formed his new "regular cabinet" from the "depraved and demoralized boyar clique"—including Ralet (known to him as "Raletto"). By contrast, Sibechi notes Ralet's "unrelenting efforts for the development of Moldavian education", and especially his success in obtaining a sizable budget from Ghica (much of it went toward the establishment of new schools). Scriban also underscores that "everyone knows that, in this capacity, he distinguished himself with his fiery zeal and his stoic abnegation". In recognition for his role, in 1855 he was made president of clubs: the Society for the Encouragement of Young Romanians to Study Abroad, and the Naturalists' Society. One of his donations went to Mount Athos' Prodromos, for the specific task of educating Aromanians.

A fellow minister, Anastasie Panu, recalls that, by early 1855, most members of the cabinet were pushing for immediate reforms: Ralet prioritized the confiscation of monastery estates, namely those directly controlled by the Constantinopolitan and Jerusalemite Patriarchates. The Prince himself was more interested in ending slavery; Ralet and Panu argued that this should be done by sheer abolition, with no compensation for the owners, but their proposal was immediately vetoed by Ștefan Catargiu, who "began shouting that this would mean spoliation." The controversy was abruptly ended by news that a Romani slave, Dincă, had committed a murder-suicide to protest his fate; this soon became a cause célèbre, allowing Ghica to speed up the abolition. Between July 1855 and March 1856, Ralet and Negri were sent on what turned out to be a successful diplomatic mission to Istanbul, by way of Rumelia Eyalet (modern-day Bulgaria). The two envoys probed the Porte regarding the Moldavian monasteries and their foreign loyalties.

The first leg of the voyage took the two Moldavians to the Wallachian capital city, Bucharest. They were received there by the reigning Prince, Barbu Dimitrie Știrbei, who informed them that he did not approve of Ghica's plan, which was to take nationalize virtually all the estates held by the "Holy Realms", and would only support the purchase or confiscation of a quarter of the land. Despite this disagreement, the two Moldavians were joined on their journey by a Wallachian diplomat, D. Aristarhi. They then crossed over to Varna, and took the Austrian steamboat service across the Black Sea. Upon his arrival to Istanbul, Ralet became one of the last visitors received by the Polish exile writer, Adam Mickiewicz, before his death later that year; the Wallachian guest met Ottoman figures such as Âli and Kıbrıslı Pasha, and also Sheikh Boumaza, who was a veteran of the French wars in Algeria.

Residing for a while in Pera, Ralet and Negri could network with a colony of Moldavian and Wallachian expatriates, whose other members included Alecsandri and Ion Ghica, as well as with the Frenchman Laurent, who had been incapacitated during the Siege of Sevastopol. As reported by this other Ghica, Negri and Ralet were being harassed by the Greek monks, who opposed the confiscations, and also snubbed by the Ottoman Imperial Council. They approached the Ottoman officials with proposals for Aromanian cultural autonomy, but found their project swiftly rejected. Their secondary, goodwill, mission was to contact the French Ambassador, to whom they donated 4,240 Guilder (or 50,000 French francs). These had been collected from Moldavian citizens through a public subscription, specifically to benefit Sevastopol veterans. Ralet and Negri's correspondence with Prince Ghica additionally reveals that they were to consider offering military support by Moldavian militias, a "baptism of blood" that would then entitle Moldavia to claim Bessarabia back from a defeated Russian Empire.

=== Unionist leader ===
Ralet pledged his support for Romanian nationalism, which now took the form of campaigning for a Moldo–Wallachian political union. Upon making this choice, he decided never again to write his letters in French, as he had done occasionally up to that point, explaining that: "we must now, more than ever before, think and feel in Romanian". According to Cornea, he engaged in this new work with the same "abnegation and manly dignity" that had characterized Wallachia's radical liberal, Nicolae Bălcescu. Ralet and Alecsandri were "factor[s] of pacification and cohesion", who resented demagoguery and always maintained a "sense of ridicule". During 1855, Ralet became a regular contributor in Alecsandri's nationalist review, România Literară, where his "satirical musings", disguised as serious aphorisms, concentrated his "realistic observation." He returned from Istanbul with another steamboat, reaching the port of Galați. In December of that year, possibly after being encouraged by Ion Ghica, he began recording his impressions of the Oriental travel he had just returned from.

România Literară additionally featured Ralet's renewed critique of Latinate modernizers. His articles note that the Romanian lexis was by then imbued with non-Latin words, which were also "ancestral" (străbune). He concluded, that, though Romanians were Latin by origin, un popor ce vrea să se îngâmfeze cu istoria sa, firește, nu poate să fie înstrăinat de moștenirea sa cea mai legiuită și cea mai scumpă, de limba părinților săi ("a people that wishes to parade its history, as is natural, cannot be alienated from its most legitimate and dearest possession, namely the language of one's parents"). According to Pippidi, the observations he made on this topic are "perfectly reasonable", and backed up by citations from philologists such as Claude Charles Fauriel and Friedrich Christian Diez; the articles make him one of the first culture critics to have explored the topic of exterior "forms" and native "content". The status of Moldavia under foreign tutelage was explored by Ralet in his rhyming work of satire, România după Tractat ("Romania after the Treaty"), published by Romanian exiles in Brussels in 1856. It was partly a pastiche from earlier texts by Alecu Beldiman. Cornea was dismissive of its literary value, suggesting that Ralet had shown significantly more skill in Plutarcul Moldovei; he qualifies this verdict by pointing out the brochure's ideological worth, which is "beyond any reproach."

On 1 April 1856, Prince Ghica ordered that Ralet, Kogălniceanu and Constantin Hurmuzachi establish procedures for jury trials. In May, the three of them, alongside Alexandru Papadopol-Calimah, sat on an advisory commission which promoted near-complete freedom of the press. As recalled by Papadopol-Calimah, a group of ministers comprising Ralet, Mavrogheni, Negri and Ion Ghica was most unrelenting in persuading the Prince that he should adopt the most advanced reforms in this particular field. Ralet joined the unionist committee in or around 30 May 1856, almost immediately after Prince Grigore had ended his term (with a farewell speech in which he encouraged his ministers to rally around the unionist ideal). The interval saw him depicted as one of unionist leaders in a lithograph put out by D. I. Cerbureanu. By June, he had embarked on a correspondence with Ion Ghica, informing him that the nationalist platform was taken up by the counties, but also that the "reactionaries" had gone on the offensive. The unionist movement, he noted, was being labeled as anti-state, even as its adversaries "lean on the Austrians for their support" (se anină de nemți ca să se sprijine). He insisted on providing his direct contribution to the modernization of Moldavia's landscape: also in June, he and Alecsandri, alongside Nicolae Vogoride, offered to donate estates they owned along the Siret for building a state railway.

In early 1856, an Austrian informant in Moldavia, known simply as Stokera, reported that Ralet was among a group of 43 boyars who could legitimately contest the princely throne in Iași, but who "rendered no real service to the country, have no partisans, and the same time never stated a claim up to this point". In June, however, various Moldavian opinion-makers were advancing a project to form a triumvirate regency of Caimacami, with Ralet, Mavrogheni and Negri as the three most sympathetic candidates. In his correspondence with the Wallachian Gheorghe Magheru, Ralet expressed nostalgia for, and gratitude toward, his former liege Grigore Ghica, seen by him as "the most national" of recent rulers. The anti-unionists managed to appoint one of their patrons, Teodor Balș, to the one-man regency, upon which he began a heavy-handed repression of the National Party. Ralet's correspondence details allegations against the regime, and especially his perception of Balș as a servant of Austrian interests. In January 1857, Ralet, Mavrogheni and Kogălniceanu signed up to an open letter, asking Abdulmejid to recall Balș. This initiative was received with consternation by a Bukovinan associate, C. Hurmuzachi; though he did not approve of Balș, he argued that Ralet and the others were voluntarily chipping away at Moldavia's political autonomy. He also claimed that the letter was a trap set for them by the Sturdzas, in collaboration with another former Caimacam, Stefan Bogoridi.

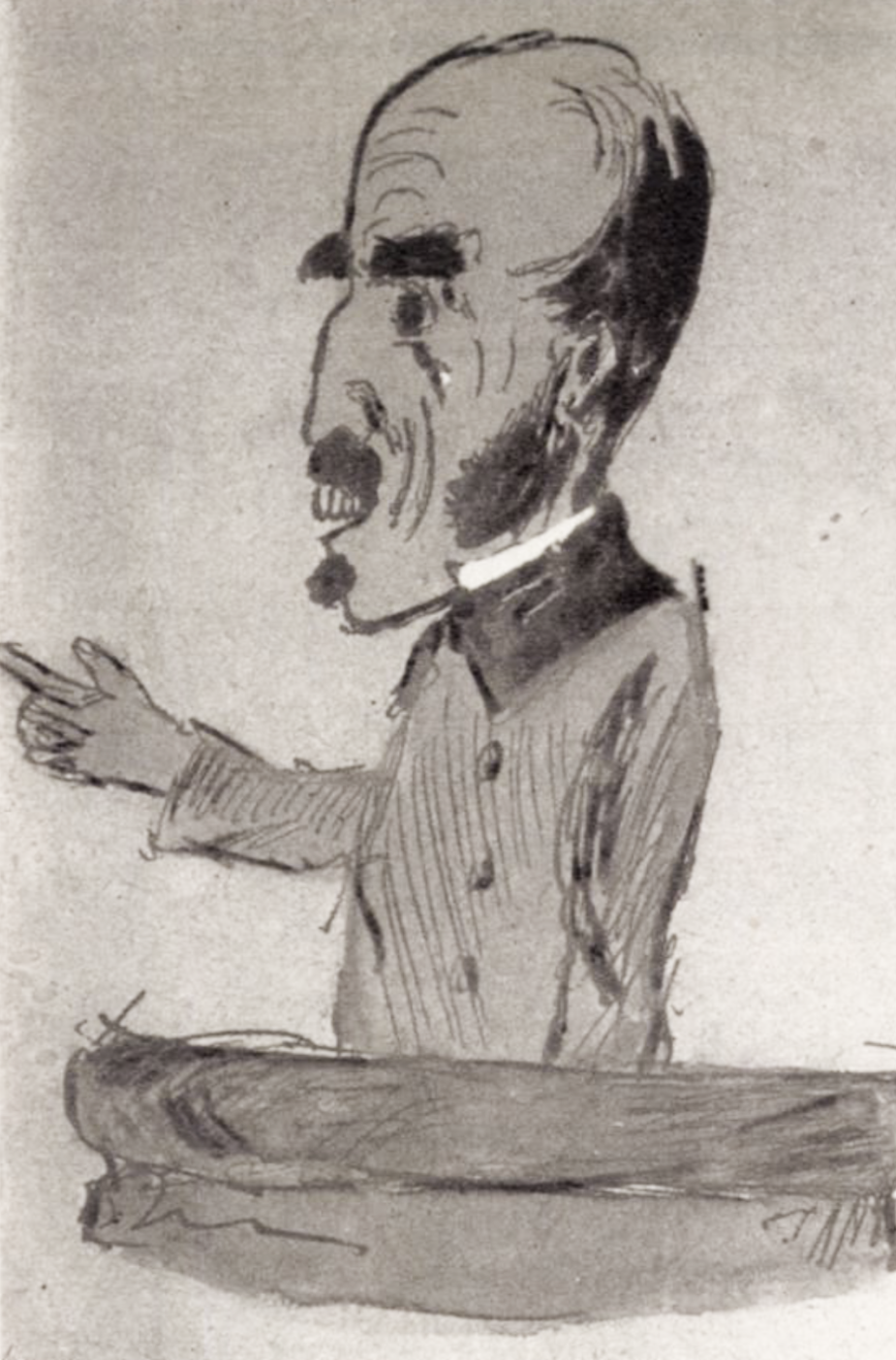
Ralet at the Ad-hoc Divan rostrum. December 1857 caricature by Henric Cortazzi

The Caimacam died suddenly the following March—this turn of events was seen by Ralet as ominous, in that it showed the outcome of policies that go against "public opinion and a people's wishes". Balș had designated Vogoride as his successor. Ralet expressed satisfactions with this move, since Vogoride's status as a foreigner had angered the old and established Moldavian boyardom, pushing it toward unionism. Upon beginning his mandate, Vogoride revealed himself as a conservative, and loyal to the Porte—in what was a last-ditch effort to contain the unionists, ahead of a scheduled legislative election in July 1857. Assisted by his minister Costin Catargi, he introduced censorship of the press during March. Ralet himself channeled the opposition to such moves, opening his house in Iași to be used by "men of letters" who signed petitions; he and the unionist committee presented Vogoride with one of these papers.

The protest was ignored; this prompted the committee to form a delegation, comprising Ralet, Alecsandri and Kogălniceanu, which was sent to contact the European commissars, who operated from Bucharest. They arrived there on 13 April, and went on to meet the plenipotentiaries. The French commissar, Baron Talleyrand, noted that the three "men of high distinction" managed to impress him and his colleagues, who became more favorable toward unionist grievances. Ahead of concurrent elections in Wallachia, Ralet voiced his admiration for the Wallachian campaigners, who, despite forming several distinct electoral committees, had all embraced the unionist platform. He himself became a correspondent for Constantin A. Kretzulescu's Bucharest paper, Concordia, and for V. A. Urechia's Paris-based Opiniunea. He may also be the author of a letter taken up by L'Indépendance Belge, in which he explained the cause of Moldo–Wallachian union as fundamental for the European balance of power.

=== Defeating Vogoride ===
A census of that era shows Ralet as qualifying for the electors' list in Botoșani County as a Vornic, a landowner in Bucecea, and a "government-recognized lawyer". The election was compromised by widespread fraud, attributable to Vogoride and his Ottoman enablers. An indignant Ralet produced commentary on the manner in which Vogoride and Nicolae Istrati had re-engineered the electoral body in order to over-represent the known "reactionaries". A letter he sent to Ioan I. Filipescu of Wallachia, on 17 July, made specific accusations against Vogoride's Vornic in Vrancea County, Iordache Pruncu, whom he depicted as accepting bribery in exchange for fraud. Also then, Ralet found himself stripped of his right to vote, since he "did not provide evidence of his naturalization" (n-a dat dovezi de împământenire); according to Sibechi, the accusation may have been at least partly correct.

The committee tried to muster international opposition to Vogoride. It sent Ralet on another mission to contact the commissars in Bucharest—this time alongside Metropolitan Scriban. The full intrigue was uncovered by Vogoride's wife (and Negri's half-sister) Cocuța Conachi, who confiscated her husband's incriminating correspondence with the Porte (represented by Musurus Pasha). Negri and Rallet networked between her and the French legation in Bucharest, threatening to publish the evidence; in the aftermath of the scandal, the Ottomans agreed to have a repeat election in September, carried by the National Party. As recounted by Bejenaru, Ralet "uncovered the masquerade", ensuring that unionism could no longer be opposed. The same was noted by Anghelescu and Sibechi, according to whom Ralet was the most significant party in undoing Vogoride's conspiracy.

Also in 1857, Ralet was inspired to contribute works of drama, seeing theater as a venue for national pedagogy, and, to this end, contributed several satirical plays in verse. Published in Bucharest as several installments, and also as a volume of Scene naționale ("National Scenes"), they included Pavel Clopotarul ("Pavel the Sexton"), which enjoyed success with the public. Lăzăreanu believes that Ralet had mastered the genre, with all samples being "equally good". He notes that his metaphors had surpassed the poetic standards set by the likes of Dimitrie Bolintineanu, and were reaching for more uncommon comparisons. Manolescu saw them as announcing the solo performances written in the 20th century by Marin Sorescu, but with hints of skepticism which mirror Mihai Eminescu's worldview. Lăzăreanu also mentions a comedy of manners, Harță ("Quarrel"), which is "charmingly dosed" and contains a "very interesting lexical matter"; the same work is reviewed by Anghelescu as a study in the yeomanry's encroachment by land-grabbing boyars. As Frunză asserts, Ralet the playwright should be commended for his originality, as well as for his "enrichment of the language with numerous folk expressions." Resuming his propaganda work at Iași, Ralet also authored a brochure, Unirea și clevetitorii ei ("The Union and Its Naysayers"), which ended in his own version of the patriotic hymn, Hora Unirii. Seen by Manolescu as "quite good verse", it included the following exhortation:

Voinicel cu cușmă lungă
Din a Siretului luncă,
Peste Olt cântând vei merge
Și-o mireasă-ți vei alege.
Pandure, chitaci din fire,
Ia-ți arcul cel de iubire,
Peste Milcov să zbori iute
Ca s-ajungi la Vrancea-n munte.

Să jucăm hora română
Ca țiindu-ne de mână,
Nimi n-o fi cap sau coadă,
De frăție-om da dovadă.

Translation:

Strapping lad from Siret's fen,
Take your hat and songs, and then,
Ride down to the Olt to find
One bride who will take your kind.
As for you, my Pandur shot,
Aim for love, and tie your knot;
To the Milcov, seek your maiden—
Vrancea Land is where you'll find 'em.

Dance, Romanians, arm in arm,
No man's cheated, there's no harm.
That's the hora we extend—
Brotherhood that has no end.

=== Suvenire and death ===
Ralet and Neculai Canano were the two National-Party candidates elected by Botoșani's college of great landowners, in what was an all-unionist sweep. He took 37 out of a possible 40 votes, and began his mandate on 30 August. On 23 September, the resulting Ad-hoc Divan tasked him with verifying and validating other elections, and, on 4 October, elected him as one of its five permanent secretaries. Ralet and Panu were assigned to a 9-member committee which set the main points on the agenda; doing so required his direct cooperation with conservative unionists such as Lascăr Catargiu. On 19 October 1857, Ralet participated in the session which confirmed the Divan deputies' platform—unification, autonomy and neutrality for the resulting state, constitutionalism, and the election of a foreigner as monarch. A Wallachian guest, Marin Serghiescu, found that "our brother Rallet" was largely responsible for the consensus being reached. He was also instrumental in obtaining Catargiu's approval for the platform, after successfully proposing that motions on equality before the law be postponed, allowing the perpetuation of boyar privileges. In November, Ralet was a rapporteur on church affairs, proposing that the Moldavian Metropolis and its Wallachian counterpart form a Romanian autocephalous church; he also spoke in favor of extending liberal policies to cover land reform.

In parallel to his nationalist engagement, and in contrast to other figures of his revolutionary generation, Ralet came to express his Turkophilia, shaped by his experiences in Istanbul; in his final years, he had taken up the study of Ottoman Turkish. In May of June 1858, Ralet left for France, on what was possibly his final diplomatic mission. After consultations with Wallachians such as Nicolae Golescu and Dimitrie Brătianu, Ralet and Negri had decided to present the Divan's resolutions directly to Napoleon III, in Paris. One letter by their fellow deputy, C. Hurmuzachi, indicates that they had no legal mandate, and simply took their orders from Bucharest—the situation, Hurmuzachi noted, was anomalous, adding: "Ralet is both sick and a diplomat of that well-known school, or clique." Elsewhere, Hurmuzachi clarifies that he viewed Ralet and Panu as the associates of Kogălniceanu, whom he regarded as Moldavia's "Catiline", a man of "no steady or solid principles". The mission was observed by Henry Bulwer, the British Ambassador to the Porte. According to Bulwer, Ralet was a more practical man than Kogălniceanu, since the latter still did not accept union without a set of democratic reforms (including universal male suffrage, which the Ottomans could have never allowed).

Writing to I. Ghica from France, Ralet revealed the scope of his conversations with Napoleon's courtiers. He had asked that, should unionism be rejected, then "at least [...] spare us from having to deal with the estranged figures of the past". This referred to the activity of several, self-exiled, former princes, whom he saw as groveling for their respective thrones. Ralet was already struggling to remain active. The sickness mentioned by Hurmuzachi was diagnosed as tuberculosis; it had been greatly aggravated during his time in Pera, and he was seeking assistance from qualified physicians in the West. During his stay, he printed in Paris the definitive account of his Oriental journey: Suvenire și impresii de călătorie în România, Bulgaria, Constantinopole. Rated by critics a talented dilettante who wrote an enjoyable prose, he combined sociological observations with a moralist's indulgent irony. As seen by Pippidi, he may have been "the first interpreter of Turkish culture in Romanian, and for Romanian readers." Anghelescu, who considers Suvenire to be Ralet's most important work, was impressed by its "melancholy sense of history", but also for his "direct observations of the common folk, whom he loves for its modesty and its honest nature". He proposes that such digressions announce the more accomplished essays of a Wallachian writer, Alexandru Odobescu.

Frunză also draws parallels with Odobescu, but points out to Suvenire's heavy reliance on the Moldavian dialect, which Ralet promoted into the literary language. His vision of written Romanian was as a language that would be understandable to common folk, "though without being retrograde". Scholar Ion Roman highlights another difference between Ralet and his peer Bolintineanu, who was also writing accounts of his Ottoman journeys: the former is "concise in his expression, this being a quality that Bolintineanu does not display." The two men apparently read each other's notes, and there is a degree of intertextuality shared between them. Bolintineanu's own account, in the definitive print, features an homage to his Moldavian colleague, commending him for his "ingenious observations" on the society of Pera. Manolescu agrees that Suvenire is Ralet's masterpiece, one which borrows a standard romantic model from Alecu Russo and enriches it with the "unpredictable associations" that form a staple of Ralet's humor. "One of the most intelligent" travelogues, its essay-like portions (such as one explaining the Islamic take on love and sex, which Ralet found to be healthier than the Moldavians' "efforts and sobs") are "unequaled" and "unblemished by time."

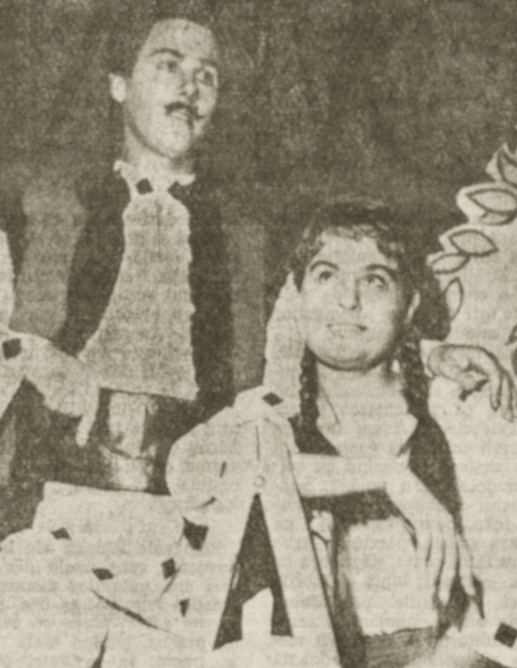
Mihai Pruteanu as yeoman Harță, in a 1960 production of Alecsandri's play, which reuses Ralet's comedic themes

In describing his travels, Ralet commends the Osmanlis and the "Turkish people" for having embraced reform, and especially for doing so without "blindly adopting what we in Europe take to mean civilization [...] We would not wish for them to regard as prejudice all things that hamper vice." He also underscores his definitive identification as a Romanian, censuring the Phanariotes for having "exploited the Romanian lands", making satirical remarks about Dragomans, and being enthralled by the Wallachian bourgeoisie (with its "national vigor" and its cult for the vernacular writings of Anton Pann). Suvenire is praised by Zamfir for expressing the full scope of its author's personality, and for its convincing depiction of Istanbul as a "view on the world itself". As the same critic observes, Ralet veered away from "romantic cliches", and instead reached artistic profundity in commending the Turks for their fatalism—according to Zamfir, this attitude reflected the writer's own moral agony, as he was already losing his battle with tuberculosis. It is the only full-scale book Ralet ever wrote: although deeply cultured, he was reticent with other people and frightened of exposing himself to the public. Ralet died on 25 October 1858, in either Botoșani or Bucecea. His death certificate, which refers to him as the "Vornic and knight Dimitrie Raletu", reports that he was aged 43.

== Legacy ==
As Pippidi explains, Ralet's private life had remained a mystery, with the only clue offered by a brief passage of the last will. Here, the Vornic mentions a "beloved creature, who had given purpose to this sad life of mine". In August 1907, historian Nicolae Iorga recorded as news that: "The widow of D. Ralet, that writer and combatant for the Union, has died in Iași." Ralet left his estate to be used by the government, for works of charity. He also specified that part of his money should go to furthering the education of impoverished young girls of Iași. His grave is located in the burial grounds assigned to the Dormition Church of Botoșani. On 1 November, at Saint Spyridon Church in Iași, Metropolitan Scriban dedicated Ralet his sermon in his memory, calling him "our friend of principle and of duty, of deeds and of sorrows", as well as "the first Apostle of [our national] regeneration". Immediate tributes also include an article by poet Gheorghe Sion, hosted in Bolintineanu's paper, Dâmbovița, in November 1858. Its artistic worth created a bond between Bolintineanu and Sion.

In Ralet's lifetime, Alecsandri had published a comédie en vaudevilles, called Doi morți vii ("Two Living Dead"). During an 1865 performance in Bukovina, Alexandru Hurmuzaki noticed that one of its characters, the poet Acrostichescu, resembled "that poor fella Dumitrachi [sic] Rallet". As both Sibechi and Zamfir note, the Vornic's terminal affliction had prevented him from witnessing the realization of his cherished dream, namely the formation of the United Principalities in 1859. The union was effected by princely elections in December 1858–January 1859, during which the National Party supported Alexandru Ioan Cuza. As reported by the Alecsandri, the Iași apartment still nominally rented by "our poor friend Rallet" and the adjacent room (which housed an elephant skeleton) were used as a temporary headquarters by Cuza's supporters. The state's new institutions included a Central Commission in Focșani, which, in 1860, put out an almanac of "things of interest to the Romanian people", featuring one of Ralet's moralizing essays. One theme from the Vornic's comedic writing was reused in the 1860s by Alecsandri, who used it for another of his musical comedies, known as Harță Răzășul. Lăzăreanu and other scholars have proposed that the titular aggrieved yeoman, appearing in both, versions is also the inspiration for the pugnacious rooster in Ion Creangă's 1876 children's story, "The Purse a' Tuppence".

Ralet's fables remained in circulation during the 1880s and '90s, when they were included in topical collections by G. S. Petrini and Theodor Speranția. Writing in 1882, after the Romanian War of Independence, and after the union had been consolidated into a Kingdom of Romania, Alecsandri spoke of Suvenire as "worthy of a distinct place in all public and private libraries". Also that year, he reprinted România după Tractat, which he valued as a manifesto against "foreign interference". The Kingdom era marked the affirmation of Dimitrie's nephew, Ion Ralet—who, until his death in January 1916, was a distinguished professor of mathematics at Iași, as well as an organizer of the Conservative Party. Despite Alecsandri's efforts, the deceased writer was fading out of the public's memory. Cornea, writing in 1966, called him "one of the most endearing figures among the Forty-Eighters", adding: "the cause of the obscurity surrounding his name [is due] to the adversity of fate." By the time a new edition of Suvenire appeared in 1979, it had been largely forgotten, as was its author.
