= Tudor Vladimirescu (disambiguation) =

Tudor Vladimirescu (c. 1780 – 1821) was a Wallachian Romanian revolutionary hero.

Tudor Vladimirescu may also refer to:

- Tudor Vladimirescu, Brăila, a commune in Brăila County, Romania
- Tudor Vladimirescu, Galați, a commune in Galați County, Romania
- Tudor Vladimirescu, a village in Albeşti Commune, Botoşani County, Romania
- Tudor Vladimirescu, a village in Avrămeni Commune, Botoşani County, Romania
- Tudor Vladimirescu, a village in Perișoru Commune, Călăraşi County, Romania
- Tudor Vladimirescu, a village in Mogoșești-Siret Commune, Iaşi County, Romania
- Tudor Vladimirescu, a village in Salcia Commune, Teleorman County, Romania
- Tudor Vladimirescu, a village in Băneasa Commune, Constanţa County, Romania
- Tudor Vladimirescu, a district in the town of Corabia, Olt County, Romania
- Tudor Vladimirescu, a district in the municipality of Tulcea, Tulcea County, Romania
- ROCAR, a defunct van, light truck, bus and trolleybus manufacturer in Romania, founded as Tudor Vladimirescu (T.V.) Works (Romanian: Uzinele Tudor Vladimirescu)

== See also ==
- Vladimirescu, Arad, a commune in Arad County, Romania
