= Vultureni =

Vultureni may refer to several places in Romania:

- Vultureni, a commune in Bacău County
- Vultureni, a commune in Cluj County
- Vultureni, a village in Cireşu Commune, Brăila County
- Vultureni, a village in Unțeni Commune, Botoșani County

== See also ==
- Vulturu (disambiguation)
- Vulturești (disambiguation)
