= Pădureni =

Pădureni may refer to several places in Romania:

- Pădureni, a commune in Timiș County
- Pădureni, a commune in Vaslui County
- Pădureni, a former village merged into the town of Chișineu-Criș, Arad County
- Pădureni, a village in Suseni Commune, Argeș County
- Pădureni, a village in Berești-Bistrița Commune, Bacău County
- Pădureni, a village in Dămienești Commune, Bacău County
- Pădureni, a village in Filipeni Commune, Bacău County
- Pădureni, a village in Izvoru Berheciului Commune, Bacău County
- Pădureni, a village in Mărgineni Commune, Bacău County
- Pădureni, a village in Viișoara Commune, Bihor County
- Pădureni, a village in Coșula Commune, Botoșani County
- Brăteni, a village in Dobârceni Commune, Botoșani County, formerly called Pădureni
- Pădureni, a village in Șendriceni Commune, Botoșani County
- Pădureni, a village in Chinteni Commune, Cluj County
- Pădureni, a village in Ciurila Commune, Cluj County
- Pădureni, a village in Dobromir Commune, Constanța County
- Pădureni, a village in Moacșa Commune, Covasna County
- Pădureni, a village in Dragodana Commune, Dâmbovița County
- Pădureni, a village in Buturugeni Commune, Giurgiu County
- Pădureni, a village in Grajduri Commune, Iași County
- Pădureni, a village in Popești Commune, Iași County
- Pădureni, a village in Gornești Commune, Mureș County
- Pădureni, a village in Cândești Commune, Neamț County
- Pădureni, a village in Camăr Commune, Sălaj County
- Pădureni, a village in Slimnic Commune, Sibiu County
- Pădureni, a village in Victor Vlad Delamarina Commune, Timiș County
- Pădureni, a village in Oșești Commune, Vaslui County
- Pădureni, a village in Jariștea Commune, Vrancea County
- Pădureni, a village in Tâmboești Commune, Vrancea County
- Pădureni, a district in the town of Siret, Suceava County
- Pădureni, a district in the town of Mărășești, Vrancea County
- Pădurani, a village in Mănăștiur Commune, Timiș County
- Pădureni (Râul Negru), a tributary of the Râul Negru in Covasna County
