= Ibănești =

Ibănești (IPA: [ibəˈneʃtʲ]) may refer to several places in Romania:

- Ibănești, Botoșani, a commune in Botoșani County
- Ibănești, Mureș, a commune in Mureș County
- Ibănești, Vaslui, a commune in Vaslui County
- Ibănești, a village in Cungrea commune, Olt County
