= Aurel Vlaicu (disambiguation) =

Aurel Vlaicu was an aviation pioneer.

- Aurel Vlaicu International Airport in Bucharest is named in his honor.
- Aurel Vlaicu University, Romanian university

Aurel Vlaicu may also refer to several places in Romania, all named after him:

- Aurel Vlaicu, a village in Avrămeni commune, Botoşani County
- Aurel Vlaicu, a district in the town of Geoagiu, Hunedoara County
- Aurel Vlaicu, a district in the town of Sighișoara, Mureș County by the Pârâul Câinelui (Târnava Mare) river
