= Călărași (disambiguation) =

Călărași, Calarasi or Calarashi may mean the following:

- Călărași, a city in Romania
- Călărași County in Romania
- Călărași, Moldova, a city in Moldova
- Călărași District in Moldova
- Călărași, Botoșani, a commune in Botoșani County, Romania
- Călărași, Cluj, a commune in Cluj County, Romania
- Călărași, Dolj, a commune in Dolj County, Romania
- Călărași (cavalry), historical light cavalry in Romanian lands, either military or courier service
