= Timus =

Timus may refer to:

- Thyme, a culinary and medicinal herb
- Timuş, a village in Avrămeni Commune, Botoşani County, Romania

See also:

- Thymus, an organ of the immune system
