= Șoldănești (disambiguation) =

Șoldănești is a town in Șoldănești District, Moldova.

Șoldănești may also refer to several villages in Romania:

- Șoldănești, a village in Blândești Commune, Botoșani County
- Șoldănești, a district in the town of Fălticeni, Suceava County
