= Ghilăuca =

Ghilăuca may refer to the following rivers in Romania:

- Ghilăuca, a tributary of the Ibăneasa in Botoșani County
- Ghilăuca, a tributary of the Putreda in Botoșani County
