= Adășeni =

- Commune
- Location in Botoșani County

- Location in Romania
- Coordinates: 48°4′N 26°56′E
- Country: Romania
- County: Botoșani
- Subdivisions: Adășeni, Zoițani

Government
  - Mayor (2024–2028): Dumitru Drăsleucă (AUR)
- Area: 34.37 km^{2} (13.27 sq mi)
- Elevation: 190 m (620 ft)
- Population (2021-12-01): 1,328
  - Density: 39/km^{2} (100/sq mi)
- Time zone: EET/EEST (UTC+2/+3)
- Postal code: 717016
- Area code: +40 x31
- Vehicle reg.: BT
- Website: adaseni.ro

Adășeni is a commune in Botoșani County, Western Moldavia, Romania. It is composed of two villages, Adășeni and Zoițani.
