= Vulturești =

Vultureşti may refer to several places in Romania:

- Vultureşti, a commune in Argeș County
- Vultureşti, a commune in Olt County
- Vultureşti, a commune in Suceava County
- Vultureşti, a commune in Vaslui County

== See also ==
- Vulturu (disambiguation)
- Vultureni (disambiguation)
