= Vulturu =

Vulturu may refer to several places in Romania:

- Vulturu, Constanța, a commune in Constanța County
- Vulturu, Vrancea, a commune in Vrancea County
- Vulturu, a village in Maliuc commune, Tulcea County
- Vulturu, a tributary of the river Motnău in Vrancea County

== See also ==
- Vultureni (disambiguation)
- Vulturești (disambiguation)
