= Răuseni =

- Commune
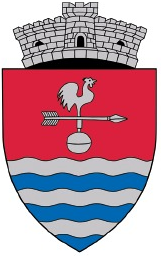
- Coat of arms

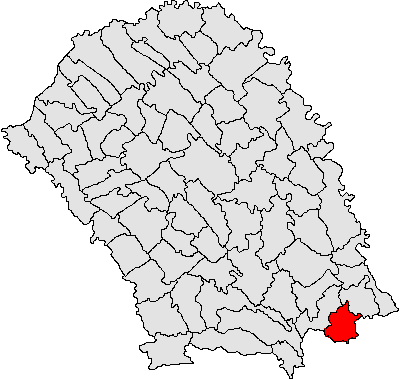
- Location in Botoșani County

- Location in Romania
- Coordinates: 47°33′N 27°13′E
- Country: Romania
- County: Botoșani
- Subdivisions: Răuseni, Doina, Pogorăști, Rediu, Stolniceni

Government
  - Mayor (2024–2028): Maria Jîjîe (PSD)
- Area: 50.99 km^{2} (19.69 sq mi)
- Elevation: 60 m (200 ft)
- Population (2021-12-01): 2,191
  - Density: 42.97/km^{2} (111.3/sq mi)
- Time zone: UTC+02:00 (EET)
  - Summer (DST): UTC+03:00 (EEST)
- Postal code: 717320
- Area code: +40 x31
- Vehicle reg.: BT
- Website: rausenibt.ro

Răuseni (German: Reuseni) is a commune in Botoșani County, Western Moldavia, Romania. It is composed of five villages: Doina, Pogorăști, Răuseni, Rediu and Stolniceni.
