= Drăgușeni, Botoșani =

Drăgușeni
- Commune
- Location in Botoșani County

- Location in Romania
- Coordinates: 48°1′N 26°49′E
- Country: Romania
- County: Botoșani
- Subdivisions: Drăgușeni, Podriga, Sarata-Drăgușeni

Government
  - Mayor (2024–2028): Eugen Nechita (PSD)
- Area: 58.93 km^{2} (22.75 sq mi)
- Population (2021-12-01): 3,360
  - Density: 57.0/km^{2} (148/sq mi)
- Time zone: UTC+02:00 (EET)
  - Summer (DST): UTC+03:00 (EEST)
- Postal code: 717140
- Area code: +40 x31
- Vehicle reg.: BT

Drăgușeni is a commune in Botoșani County, Western Moldavia, Romania. It is composed of three villages: Drăgușeni, Podriga and Sarata-Drăgușeni.
