= Brăești, Botoșani =

Brăești
- Commune
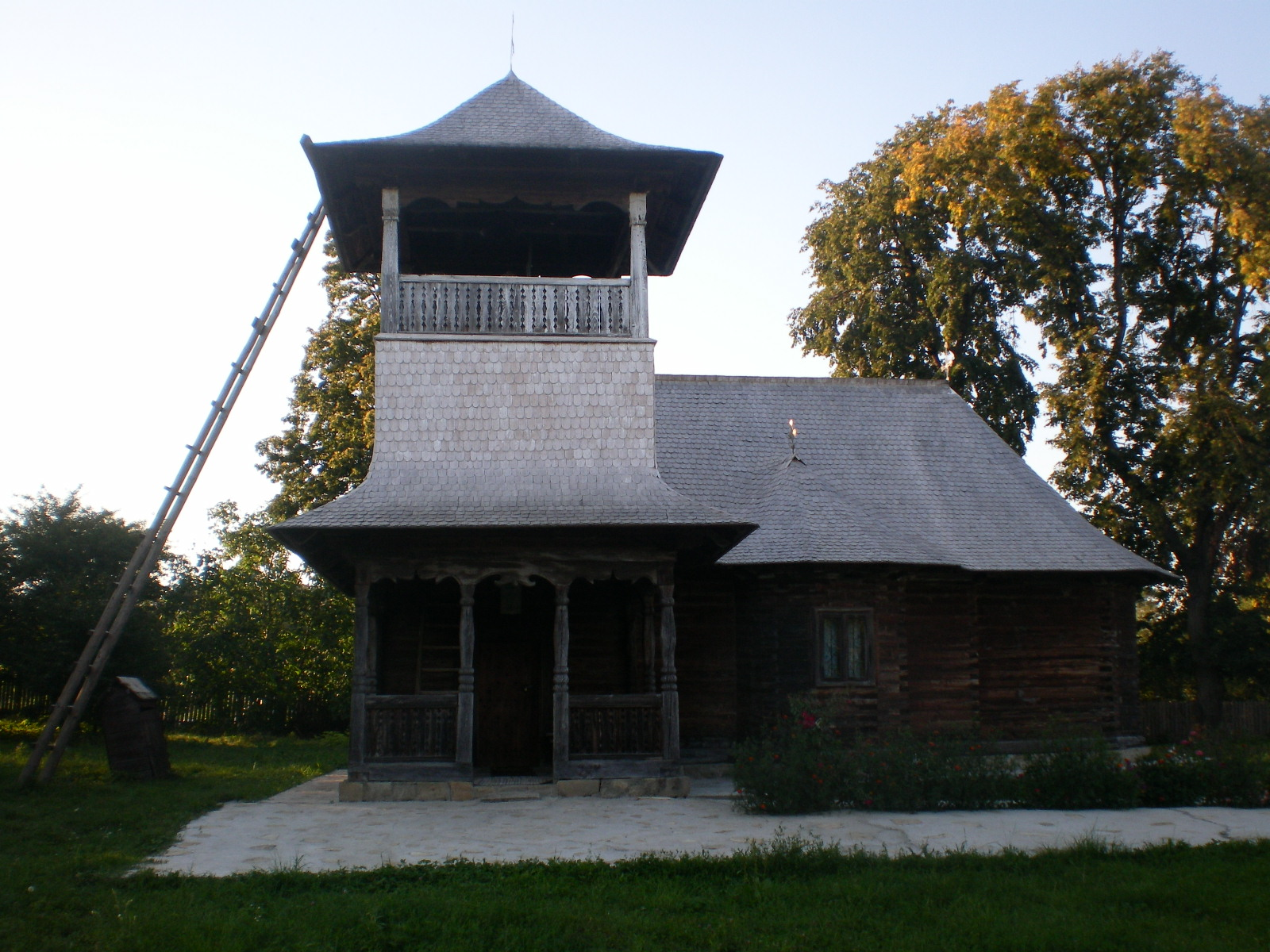

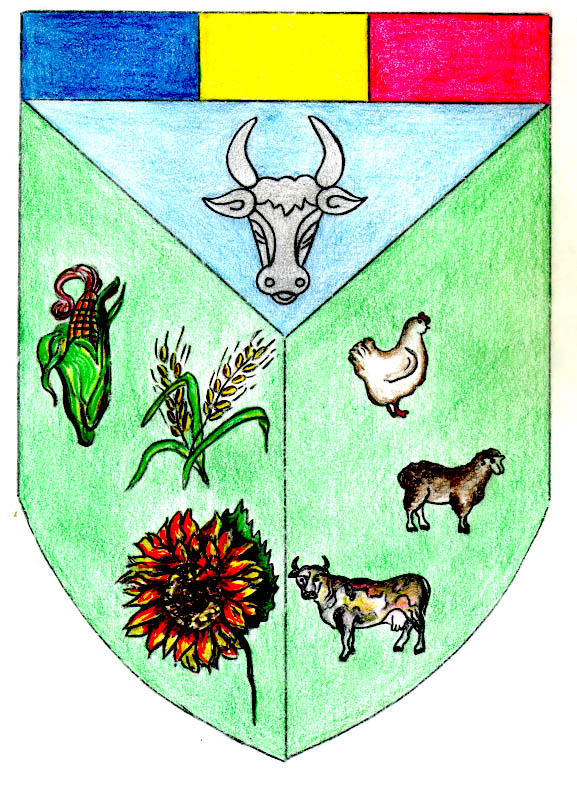
- Coat of arms

- Location in Botoșani County

- Location in Romania
- Coordinates: 47°52′N 26°28′E
- Country: Romania
- County: Botoșani
- Subdivisions: Brăești, Poiana, Popeni, Vâlcelele

Government
  - Mayor (2024–2028): Adrian Nistor (PSD)
- Area: 52.37 km^{2} (20.22 sq mi)
- Population (2021-12-01): 1,868
  - Density: 35.67/km^{2} (92.38/sq mi)
- Time zone: UTC+02:00 (EET)
  - Summer (DST): UTC+03:00 (EEST)
- Postal code: 717035
- Area code: +40 x31
- Vehicle reg.: BT
- Website: www.comunabraesti.ro

Brăești is a commune in Botoșani County, Western Moldavia, Romania. It is composed of four villages: Brăești, Poiana, Popeni and Vâlcelele.
