= Mileanca =

- Commune
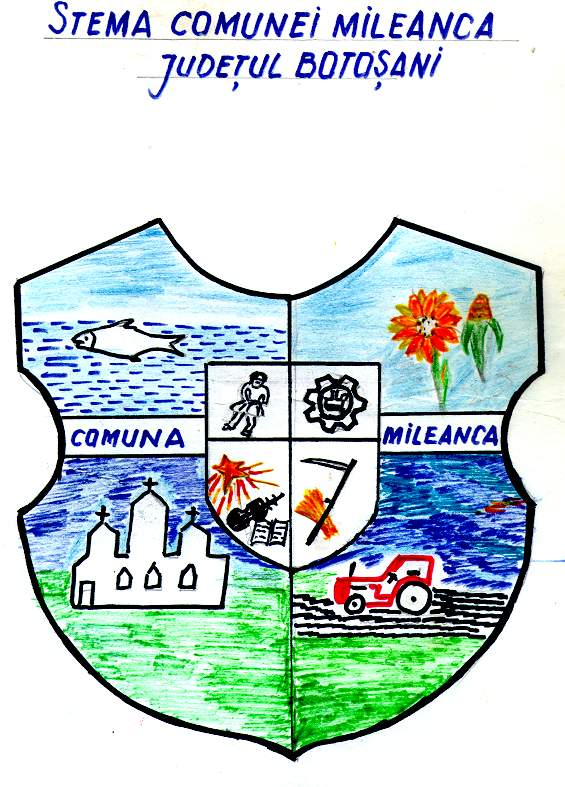
- Coat of arms

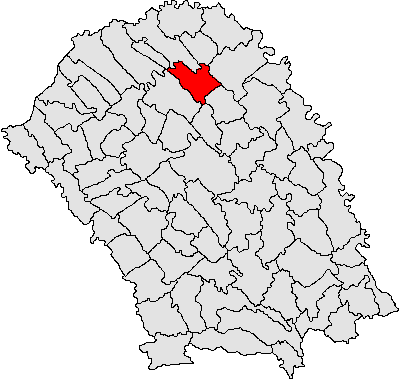
- Location in Botoșani County

- Location in Romania
- Coordinates: 48°05′N 26°42′E
- Country: Romania
- County: Botoșani
- Subdivisions: Mileanca, Codreni, Scutari, Seliștea

Government
  - Mayor (2024–2028): Alexandru Azamfirei (PSD)
- Area: 59.8 km^{2} (23.1 sq mi)
- Elevation: 120 m (390 ft)
- Population (2021-12-01): 2,107
  - Density: 35.2/km^{2} (91.3/sq mi)
- Time zone: UTC+02:00 (EET)
  - Summer (DST): UTC+03:00 (EEST)
- Postal code: 717280
- Area code: +40 x31
- Vehicle reg.: BT
- Website: www.primariamileanca.ro

Mileanca is a commune in Botoșani County, Western Moldavia, Romania. It is composed of four villages: Codreni, Mileanca, Scutari and Seliștea.
