= Santa Mare =

- Commune
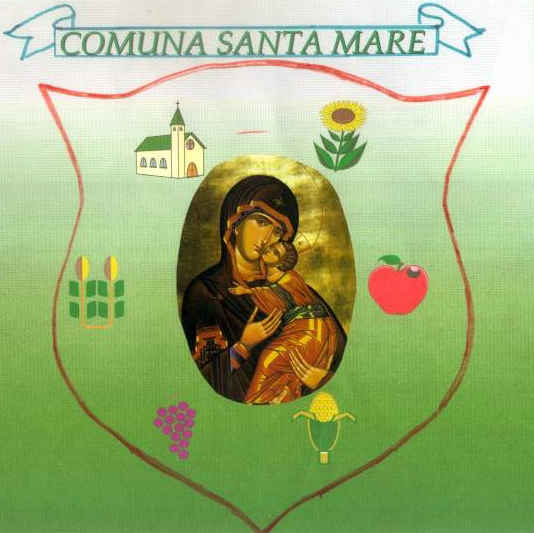
- Coat of arms

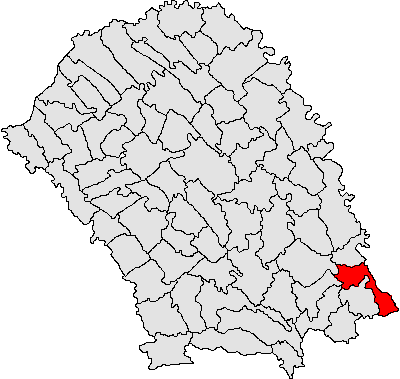
- Location in Botoșani County

- Location in Romania
- Coordinates: 47°36′N 27°21′E
- Country: Romania
- County: Botoșani
- Subdivisions: Santa Mare, Bădărăi, Berza, Bogdănești, Durnești, Ilișeni, Rânghilești, Rânghilești-Deal

Government
  - Mayor (2024–2028): Cristian Anton (PSD)
- Area: 61.36 km^{2} (23.69 sq mi)
- Population (2021-12-01): 2,418
  - Density: 39/km^{2} (100/sq mi)
- Time zone: EET/EEST (UTC+2/+3)
- Postal code: 717345
- Area code: +40 x31
- Vehicle reg.: BT
- Website: santamare.ro

Santa Mare is a commune in Botoșani County, Western Moldavia, Romania. It is composed of eight villages: Bădărăi, Berza, Bogdănești, Durnești, Ilișeni, Rânghilești, Rânghilești-Deal and Santa Mare.

== Natives ==
- Alexandru Bădărău
