= Ripiceni =

- Commune
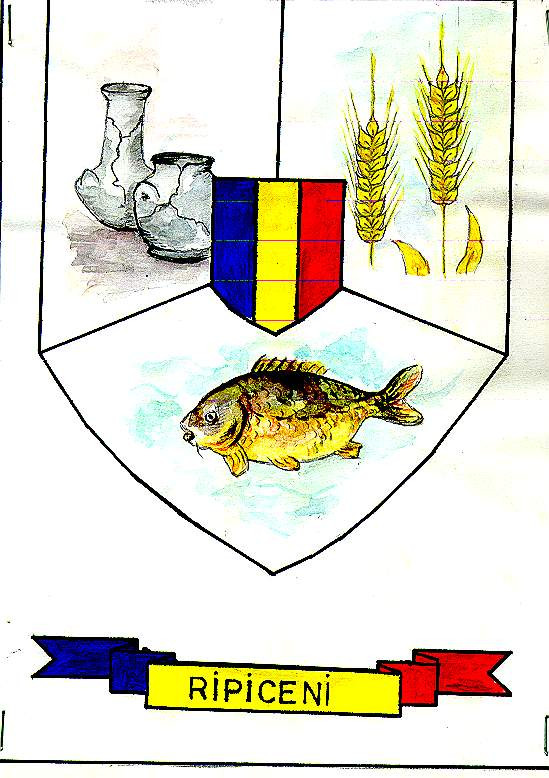
- Coat of arms

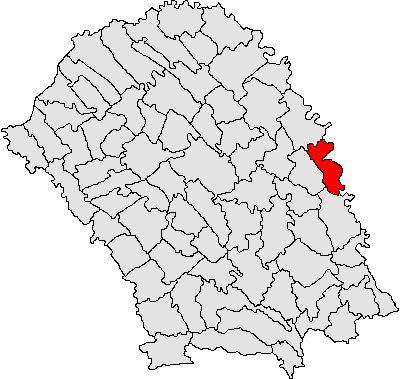
- Location in Botoșani County

- Location in Romania
- Coordinates: 47°56′50″N 27°08′33″E
- Country: Romania
- County: Botoșani
- Subdivisions: Ripiceni, Cinghiniia, Lehnești, Movila Ruptă, Popoaia, Ripicenii Vechi, Râșca

Government
  - Mayor (2024–2028): Gabriel Florin Talef (PSD)
- Area: 51.4 km^{2} (19.8 sq mi)
- Population (2021-12-01): 3,771
  - Density: 73.4/km^{2} (190/sq mi)
- Time zone: UTC+02:00 (EET)
  - Summer (DST): UTC+03:00 (EEST)
- Postal code: 717325
- Area code: +40 x31
- Vehicle reg.: BT
- Website: ripicenibt.ro

Ripiceni is a commune in Botoșani County, Western Moldavia, Romania. It is composed of seven villages: Cinghiniia, Lehnești, Movila Ruptă, Popoaia, Râșca, Ripiceni and Ripicenii Vechi. It lies along the river Prut that forms the border with Moldova.
