= Românești, Botoșani =

Românești
- Commune
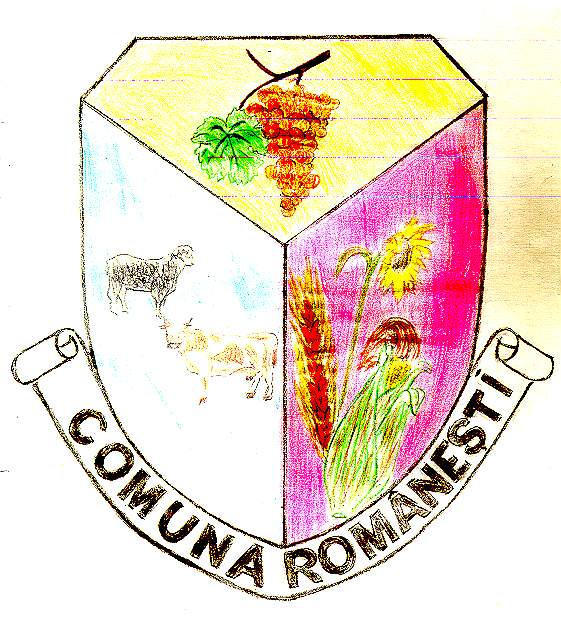
- Coat of arms

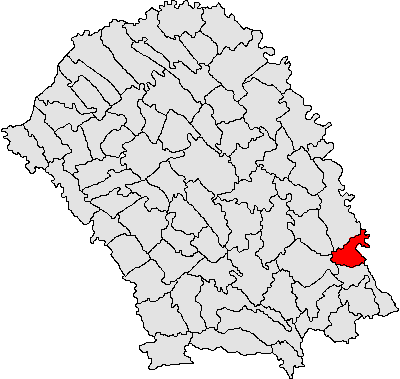
- Location in Botoșani County

- Location in Romania
- Coordinates: 47°44′N 27°14′E
- Country: Romania
- County: Botoșani
- Subdivisions: Românești, Dămideni, Românești-Vale, Sărata

Government
  - Mayor (2024–2028): Constantin Marius Răschip (PSD)
- Area: 39.34 km^{2} (15.19 sq mi)
- Elevation: 81 m (266 ft)
- Population (2021-12-01): 1,902
  - Density: 48.35/km^{2} (125.2/sq mi)
- Time zone: UTC+02:00 (EET)
  - Summer (DST): UTC+03:00 (EEST)
- Postal code: 717340
- Area code: +40 x31
- Vehicle reg.: BT

Românești is a commune in Botoșani County, Western Moldavia, Romania. It is composed of four villages: Dămideni, Românești, Românești-Vale and Sărata.
