= Mitoc, Botoșani =

Mitoc
- Commune
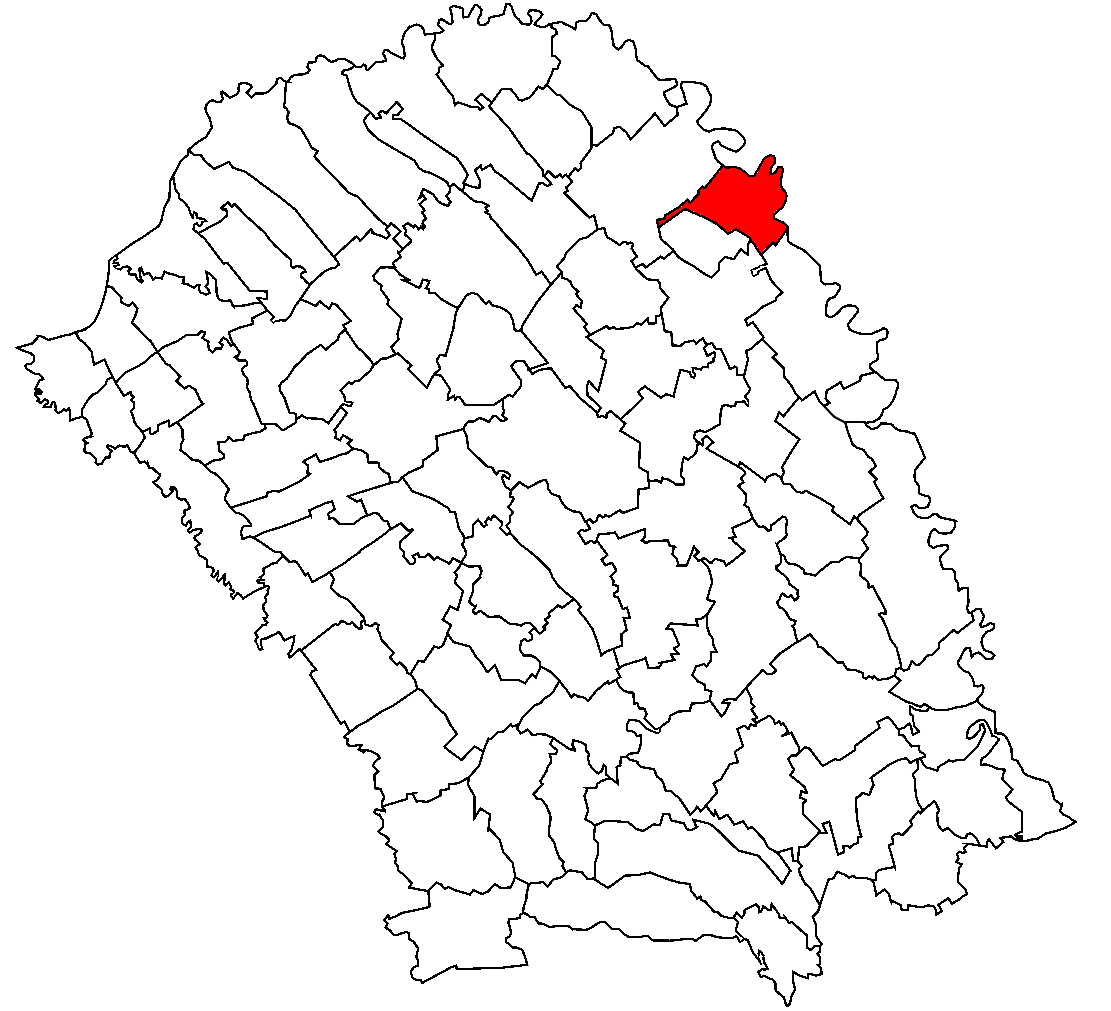
- Location in Botoșani County

- Location in Romania
- Coordinates: 48°6′N 27°1′E
- Country: Romania
- County: Botoșani
- Subdivisions: Mitoc, Horia

Government
  - Mayor (2024–2028): Ioan Galiț (PSD)
- Area: 45.12 km^{2} (17.42 sq mi)
- Population (2021-12-01): 1,690
  - Density: 37/km^{2} (97/sq mi)
- Time zone: EET/EEST (UTC+2/+3)
- Postal code: 717285
- Area code: +40 x31
- Vehicle reg.: BT

Mitoc is a commune in Botoșani County, Western Moldavia, Romania. It is composed of two villages, Horia and Mitoc.

== Natives ==
- Florică Murariu
