= Lunca, Botoșani =

Lunca
- Commune
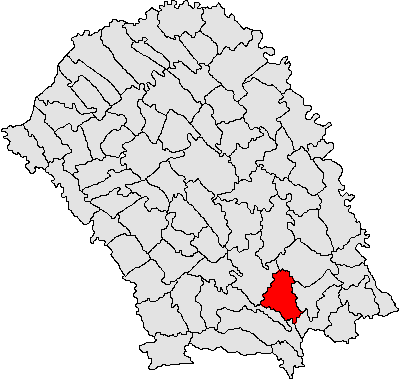
- Location in Botoșani County

- Location in Romania
- Coordinates: 47°38′N 27°0′E
- Country: Romania
- County: Botoșani
- Subdivisions: Lunca, Stroiești, Zlătunoaia

Government
  - Mayor (2024–2028): Ovidiu Constantin Maxim (PNL)
- Area: 78.46 km^{2} (30.29 sq mi)
- Elevation: 80 m (260 ft)
- Population (2021-12-01): 3,787
  - Density: 48.27/km^{2} (125.0/sq mi)
- Time zone: UTC+02:00 (EET)
  - Summer (DST): UTC+03:00 (EEST)
- Postal code: 717225
- Area code: +40 x31
- Vehicle reg.: BT
- Website: primarialunca.ro

Lunca is a commune in Botoșani County, Western Moldavia, Romania. It is composed of five villages: Băznoasa, Lunca, Stroiești, Stănești and Zlătunoaia.
