= Nicșeni =

- Commune
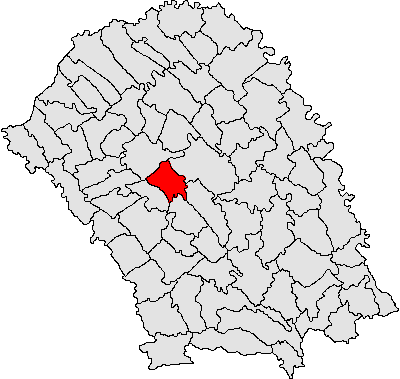
- Location in Botoșani County

- Location in Romania
- Coordinates: 47°52′N 26°38′E
- Country: Romania
- County: Botoșani
- Subdivisions: Nicșeni, Dacia, Dorobanți

Government
  - Mayor (2024–2028): Victor Claudiu Bulboacă (PNL)
- Area: 46.4 km^{2} (17.9 sq mi)
- Elevation: 150 m (490 ft)
- Population (2021-12-01): 2,509
  - Density: 54.1/km^{2} (140/sq mi)
- Time zone: UTC+02:00 (EET)
  - Summer (DST): UTC+03:00 (EEST)
- Postal code: 717290
- Area code: +40 x31
- Vehicle reg.: BT
- Website: primarianicseni.ro

Nicșeni is a commune in Botoșani County, Western Moldavia, Romania. It is composed of three villages: Dacia, Dorobanți and Nicșeni.
