= Ungureni, Botoșani =

Ungureni
- Commune
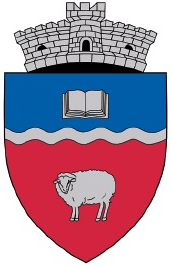
- Coat of arms

- Location in Botoșani County

- Location in Romania
- Coordinates: 47°53′N 26°48′E
- Country: Romania
- County: Botoșani
- Subdivisions: Ungureni, Borzești, Călugăreni, Călugărenii Noi, Durnești, Mihai Viteazu, Mândrești, Plopenii Mari, Plopenii Mici, Tăutești, Vicoleni

Government
  - Mayor (2024–2028): Petru Harabagiu (PSD)
- Area: 136.75 km^{2} (52.80 sq mi)
- Population (2021-12-01): 6,096
  - Density: 45/km^{2} (120/sq mi)
- Time zone: EET/EEST (UTC+2/+3)
- Postal code: 717415
- Area code: +40 x31
- Vehicle reg.: BT
- Website: comunaungureni.ro

Ungureni is a commune in Botoșani County, Western Moldavia, Romania. It is composed of twelve villages: Borzești, Călugăreni (also Călugărenii Vechi), Călugărenii Noi, Durnești, Epureni, Mihai Viteazu, Mândrești, Plopenii Mari, Plopenii Mici, Tăutești, Ungureni and Vicoleni.
