= Știubieni =

- Commune
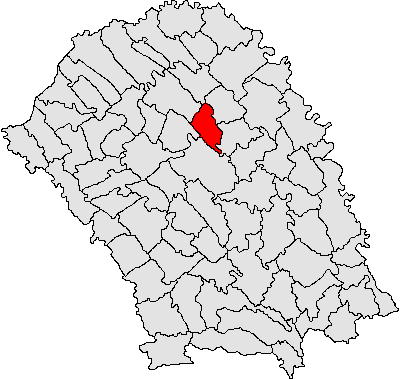
- Location in Botoșani County

- Location in Romania
- Coordinates: 47°58′N 26°47′E
- Country: Romania
- County: Botoșani
- Subdivisions: Știubieni, Ibăneasa, Negreni

Government
  - Mayor (2024–2028): Pavel Ștefanache (PSD)
- Area: 48.89 km^{2} (18.88 sq mi)
- Elevation: 95 m (312 ft)
- Population (2021-12-01): 2,278
  - Density: 46.59/km^{2} (120.7/sq mi)
- Time zone: UTC+02:00 (EET)
  - Summer (DST): UTC+03:00 (EEST)
- Postal code: 717390
- Area code: +40 x31
- Vehicle reg.: BT

Știubieni is a commune in Botoșani County, Western Moldavia, Romania. It is composed of three villages: Ibăneasa, Negreni and Știubieni.
