= Șendriceni =

- Commune
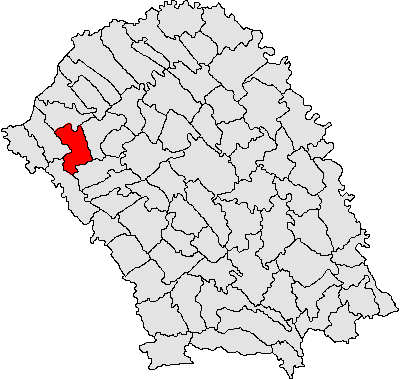
- Location in Botoșani County

- Location in Romania
- Coordinates: 47°57′N 26°21′E
- Country: Romania
- County: Botoșani
- Subdivisions: Șendriceni, Horlăceni, Pădureni

Government
  - Mayor (2024–2028): Marin Dohotariu (PSD)
- Area: 63.43 km^{2} (24.49 sq mi)
- Population (2021-12-01): 3,868
  - Density: 60.98/km^{2} (157.9/sq mi)
- Time zone: UTC+02:00 (EET)
  - Summer (DST): UTC+03:00 (EEST)
- Postal code: 717380
- Area code: +40 x31
- Vehicle reg.: BT

Șendriceni is a commune in Botoșani County, Western Moldavia, Romania. It is composed of three villages: Horlăceni, Pădureni and Șendriceni.
