= Dobârceni =

- Commune
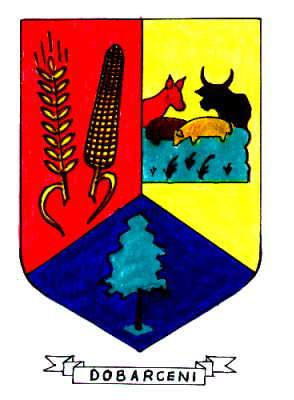
- Coat of arms

- Location in Botoșani County

- Location in Romania
- Coordinates: 47°49′N 27°4′E
- Country: Romania
- County: Botoșani
- Subdivisions: Dobârceni, Bivolari, Brăteni, Cișmănești, Livada, Murguța

Government
  - Mayor (2024–2028): Dorel Bunduc (PSD)
- Area: 58.47 km^{2} (22.58 sq mi)
- Population (2021-12-01): 2,253
  - Density: 38.53/km^{2} (99.80/sq mi)
- Time zone: UTC+02:00 (EET)
  - Summer (DST): UTC+03:00 (EEST)
- Postal code: 717130
- Area code: +40 x31
- Vehicle reg.: BT

Dobârceni is a commune in Botoșani County, Western Moldavia, Romania. It is composed of six villages: Bivolari, Brăteni (formerly Pădureni), Cișmănești, Dobârceni, Livada and Murguța.
