= Albești, Botoșani =

Albești
- Commune
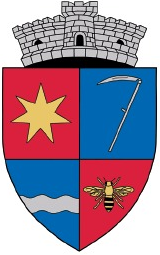
- Coat of arms

- Location in Botoșani County

- Location in Romania
- Coordinates: 47°41′N 27°04′E
- Country: Romania
- County: Botoșani
- Subdivisions: Albești, Buimăceni, Coștiugeni, Jijia, Mășcăteni, Tudor Vladimirescu

Government
  - Mayor (2024–2028): Florin Cristian Cîmpanu (PSD)
- Area: 96.35 km^{2} (37.20 sq mi)
- Elevation: 78 m (256 ft)
- Population (2021-12-01): 6,260
  - Density: 65/km^{2} (170/sq mi)
- Time zone: EET/EEST (UTC+2/+3)
- Postal code: 717005
- Area code: +40 x31
- Vehicle reg.: BT
- Website: albestibt.ro

Albești is a commune in Botoșani County, Western Moldavia, Romania. It is composed of six villages: Albești, Buimăceni, Coștiugeni, Jijia, Mășcăteni and Tudor Vladimirescu.
