= Cordăreni =

- Commune
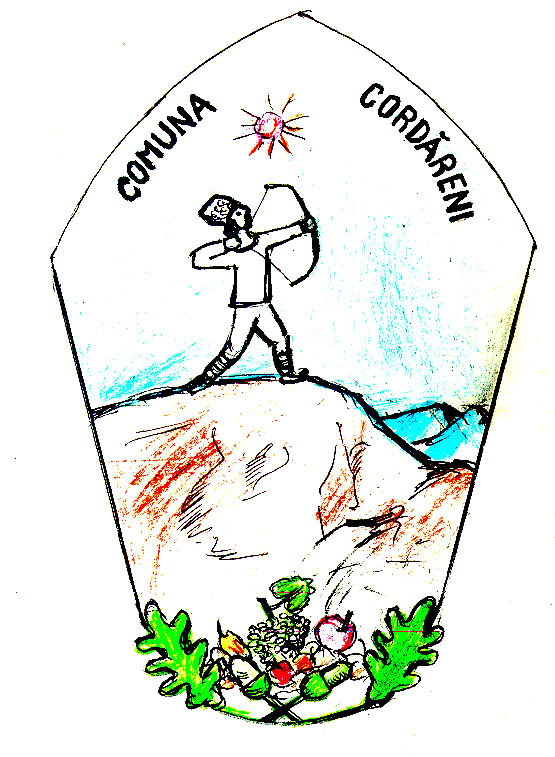
- Coat of arms

- Location in Botoșani County

- Location in Romania
- Coordinates: 47°59′N 26°35′E
- Country: Romania
- County: Botoșani
- Subdivisions: Cordăreni, Grivița, Slobozia

Government
  - Mayor (2024–2028): Constantin Dumitraș (PSD)
- Area: 41.54 km^{2} (16.04 sq mi)
- Population (2021-12-01): 1,887
  - Density: 45.43/km^{2} (117.7/sq mi)
- Time zone: UTC+02:00 (EET)
  - Summer (DST): UTC+03:00 (EEST)
- Postal code: 717070
- Area code: +40 x31
- Vehicle reg.: BT

Cordăreni is a commune in Botoșani County, Western Moldavia, Romania. It is composed of three villages: Cordăreni, Grivița and Slobozia (established in 2004).
