= George Enescu, Botoșani =

George Enescu
- Commune
- Location in Botoșani County

- Location in Romania
- Coordinates: 48°2′N 26°29′E
- Country: Romania
- County: Botoșani
- Subdivisions: Dumeni, Arborea, George Enescu, Popeni, Stânca

Government
  - Mayor (2024–2028): Bogdan Tony Murariu (PSD)
- Area: 59.4 km^{2} (22.9 sq mi)
- Population (2021-12-01): 3,104
  - Density: 52/km^{2} (140/sq mi)
- Time zone: EET/EEST (UTC+2/+3)
- Postal code: 717170
- Area code: +40 x31
- Vehicle reg.: BT
- Website: primariageorgeenescu.ro

George Enescu is a commune in Botoșani County, Western Moldavia, Romania. It is composed of five villages: Arborea, Dumeni (the commune centre), George Enescu, Popeni and Stânca.

The commune is so named because musician and composer George Enescu was born here, in the village of Liveni-Vârnav, renamed after him following his death in 1955.
