= Cristinești =

- Commune
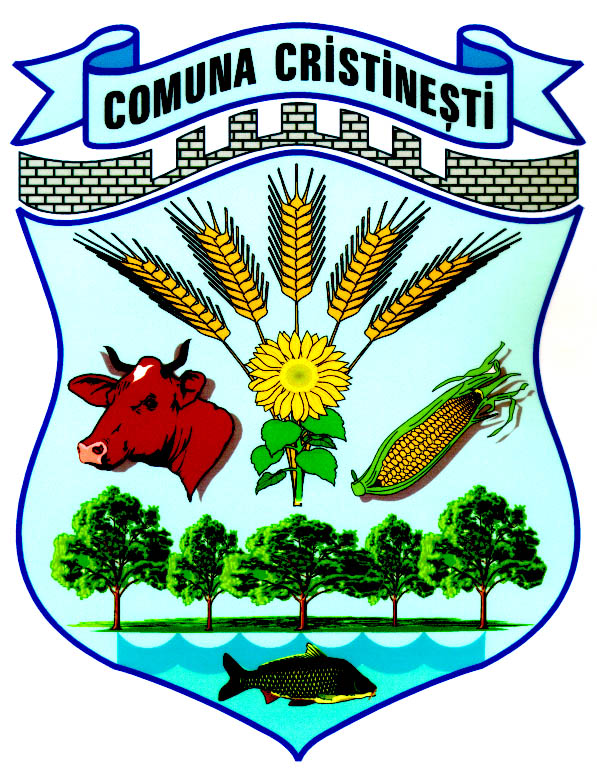
- Coat of arms

- Location in Botoșani County

- Location in Romania
- Coordinates: 48°6′N 26°23′E
- Country: Romania
- County: Botoșani
- Subdivisions: Cristinești, Baranca, Dămileni, Dragalina, Fundu Herții, Poiana

Government
  - Mayor (2024–2028): Daniela Stredie (PSD)
- Area: 63.75 km^{2} (24.61 sq mi)
- Elevation: 236 m (774 ft)
- Population (2021-12-01): 3,489
  - Density: 54.73/km^{2} (141.7/sq mi)
- Time zone: UTC+02:00 (EET)
  - Summer (DST): UTC+03:00 (EEST)
- Postal code: 717105
- Area code: +40 x31
- Vehicle reg.: BT
- Website: www.primariacristinesti.ro

Cristinești is a commune in Botoșani County, Western Moldavia, Romania. It is composed of six villages: Baranca, Cristinești, Dămileni, Dragalina, Fundu Herții and Poiana.
