= Bucecea =

- Town
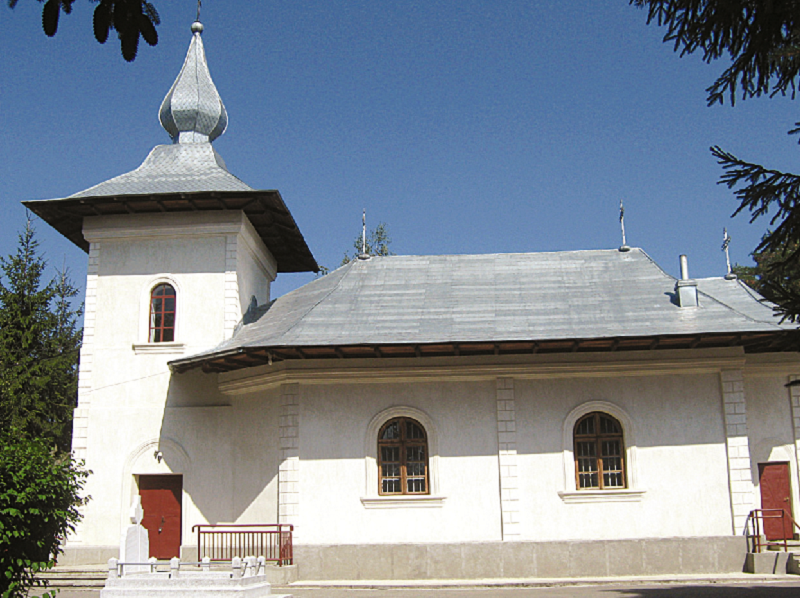
- Saint Nicholas Orthodox Church in Bucecea

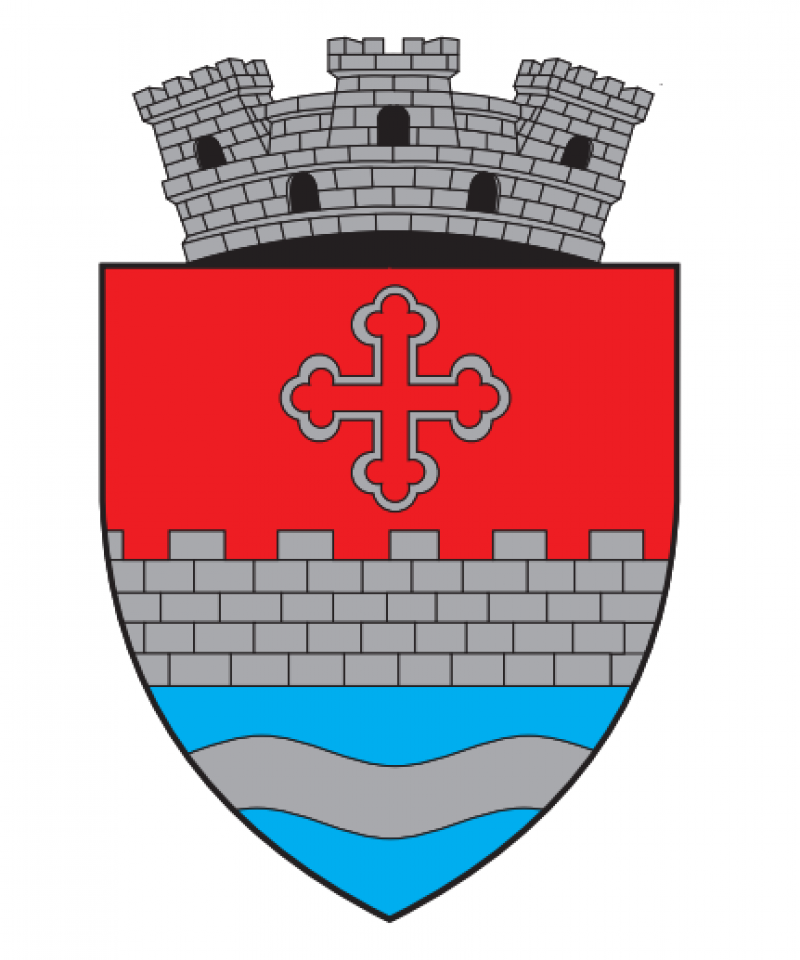
- Coat of arms

- Location in Botoșani County

- Location in Romania
- Coordinates: 47°46′N 26°26′E
- Country: Romania
- County: Botoșani

Government
  - Mayor (2024–2028): Angel Gheorghiu (PSD)
- Area: 46.85 km^{2} (18.09 sq mi)
- Elevation: 267 m (876 ft)
- Population (2021-12-01): 4,171
  - Density: 89.03/km^{2} (230.6/sq mi)
- Time zone: UTC+02:00 (EET)
  - Summer (DST): UTC+03:00 (EEST)
- Postal code: 717045
- Area code: (+40) 02 31
- Vehicle reg.: BT
- Website: primariabucecea.ro

Bucecea (Hungarian: Bucsecsea; Yiddish: בוטשעטש) is a town in Botoșani County, Western Moldavia, Romania. It administers two villages, Bohoghina and Călinești.

Historical population
Year	Pop.	±%
2002	5,128	—
2011	4,181	−18.5%
2021	4,171	−0.2%
Source: Census data
