= Unțeni =

- Commune
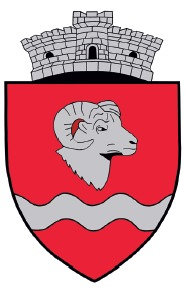
- Coat of arms

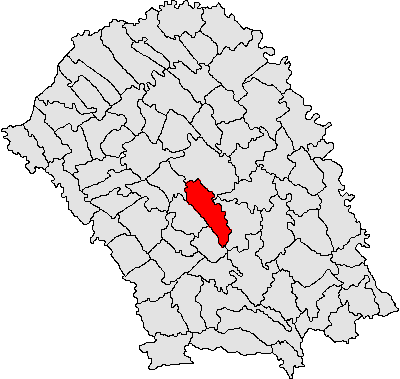
- Location in Botoșani County

- Location in Romania
- Coordinates: 47°48′N 26°47′E
- Country: Romania
- County: Botoșani
- Subdivisions: Unțeni, Burla, Burlești, Mânăstireni, Soroceni, Valea Grajdului, Vultureni

Government
  - Mayor (2024–2028): Constantin Paladi (PSD)
- Area: 64.23 km^{2} (24.80 sq mi)
- Elevation: 140 m (460 ft)
- Population (2021-12-01): 2,450
  - Density: 38.1/km^{2} (98.8/sq mi)
- Time zone: UTC+02:00 (EET)
  - Summer (DST): UTC+03:00 (EEST)
- Postal code: 717435
- Area code: +40 x31
- Vehicle reg.: BT

Unțeni is a commune in Botoșani County, Western Moldavia, Romania. It is composed of seven villages: Burla, Burlești, Mânăstireni, Soroceni, Unțeni, Valea Grajdului and Vultureni.
