= Călărași, Botoșani =

Călărași
- Commune
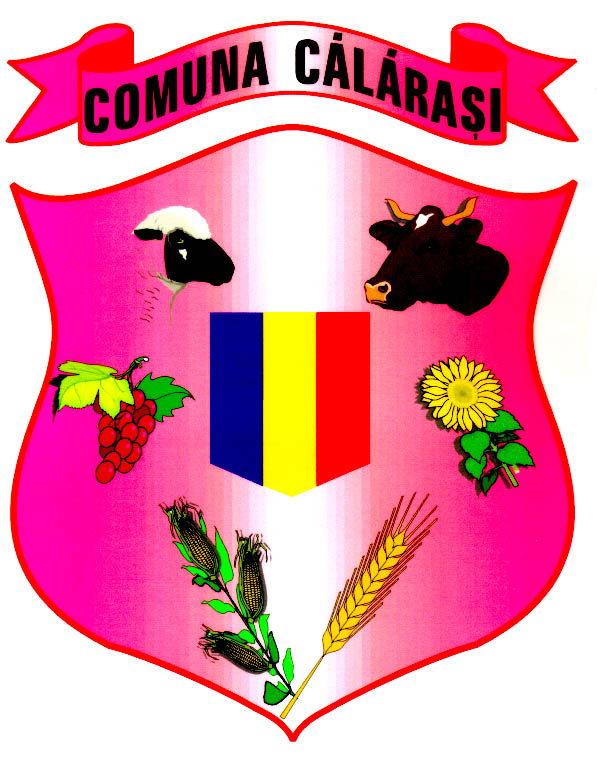
- Coat of arms

- Location in Botoșani County

- Location in Romania
- Coordinates: 47°36′N 27°16′E
- Country: Romania
- County: Botoșani
- Subdivisions: Călărași, Libertatea, Pleșani

Government
  - Mayor (2024–2028): Lazăr Claudiu Vrajotis (PSD)
- Area: 58.52 km^{2} (22.59 sq mi)
- Elevation: 145 m (476 ft)
- Population (2021-12-01): 3,285
  - Density: 56.13/km^{2} (145.4/sq mi)
- Time zone: UTC+02:00 (EET)
  - Summer (DST): UTC+03:00 (EEST)
- Postal code: 717050
- Area code: +40 x31
- Vehicle reg.: BT
- Website: primariacalarasibt.ro

Călărași (Romanian pronunciation: [kələˈraʃʲ]) is a commune in Botoșani County, Western Moldavia, Romania. It is composed of three villages: Călărași, Libertatea, and Pleșani.

== Natives ==
- Gabriela Manole-Adoc (1926–2002), sculptor
