= Blândești =

- Commune
- Location in Botoșani County

- Location in Romania
- Coordinates: 47°42′N 26°53′E
- Country: Romania
- County: Botoșani
- Subdivisions: Blândești, Cerchejeni, Șoldănești

Government
  - Mayor (2024–2028): Stelian Maxim (PNL)
- Area: 45.85 km^{2} (17.70 sq mi)
- Elevation: 95 m (312 ft)
- Population (2021-12-01): 1,640
  - Density: 36/km^{2} (93/sq mi)
- Time zone: EET/EEST (UTC+2/+3)
- Postal code: 717371
- Area code: +40 x31
- Vehicle reg.: BT

Blândești is a commune in Botoșani County, Western Moldavia, Romania. It is composed of three villages: Blândești, Cerchejeni and Șoldănești.
