= Ibănești, Botoșani =

Ibănești
- Commune
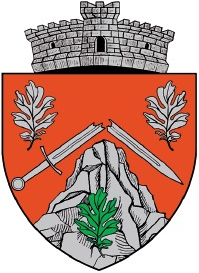
- Coat of arms

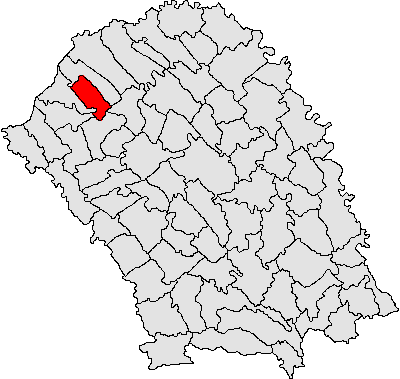
- Location in Botoșani County

- Location in Romania
- Coordinates: 48°4′N 26°22′E
- Country: Romania
- County: Botoșani
- Subdivisions: Ibănești, Dumbrăvița

Government
  - Mayor (2024–2028): Romică Magopeț (PNL)
- Area: 46.6 km^{2} (18.0 sq mi)
- Population (2021-12-01): 3,660
  - Density: 78.5/km^{2} (203/sq mi)
- Time zone: UTC+02:00 (EET)
  - Summer (DST): UTC+03:00 (EEST)
- Postal code: 717215
- Area code: +40 x31
- Vehicle reg.: BT

Ibănești is a commune in Botoșani County, Western Moldavia, Romania. It is composed of two villages, Dumbrăvița and Ibănești.
