= Avrămeni =

- Commune
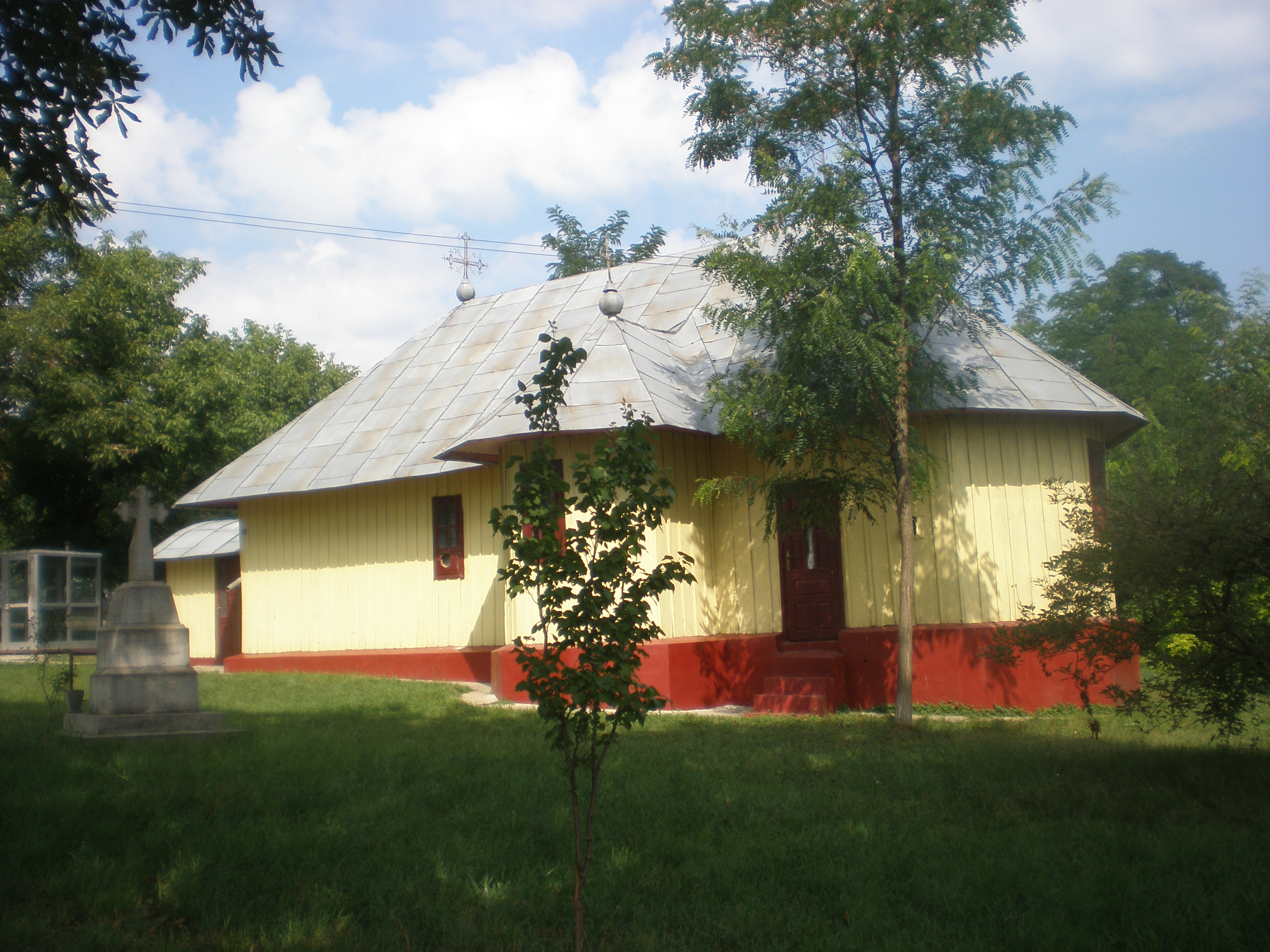
- Wooden church in Aurel Vlaicu

- Location in Botoșani County

- Location in Romania
- Coordinates: 48°01′N 26°57′E
- Country: Romania
- County: Botoșani
- Subdivisions: Aurel Vlaicu, Avrămeni, Dimitrie Cantemir, Ichimeni, Panaitoaia, Timuș, Tudor Vladimirescu

Government
  - Mayor (2024–2028): Ioan Bucătariu (PSD)
- Area: 74.23 km^{2} (28.66 sq mi)
- Population (2021-12-01): 3,311
  - Density: 44.60/km^{2} (115.5/sq mi)
- Time zone: UTC+02:00 (EET)
  - Summer (DST): UTC+03:00 (EEST)
- Postal code: 717015
- Area code: +40 x31
- Vehicle reg.: BT
- Website: www.avrameni.ro

Avrămeni is a commune in Botoșani County, Western Moldavia, Romania. It is composed of seven villages: Aurel Vlaicu, Avrămeni, Dimitrie Cantemir, Ichimeni, Panaitoaia, Timuș and Tudor Vladimirescu.
