= Botoșani County =

County of Romania

Botoșani County Județul Botoșani
- County
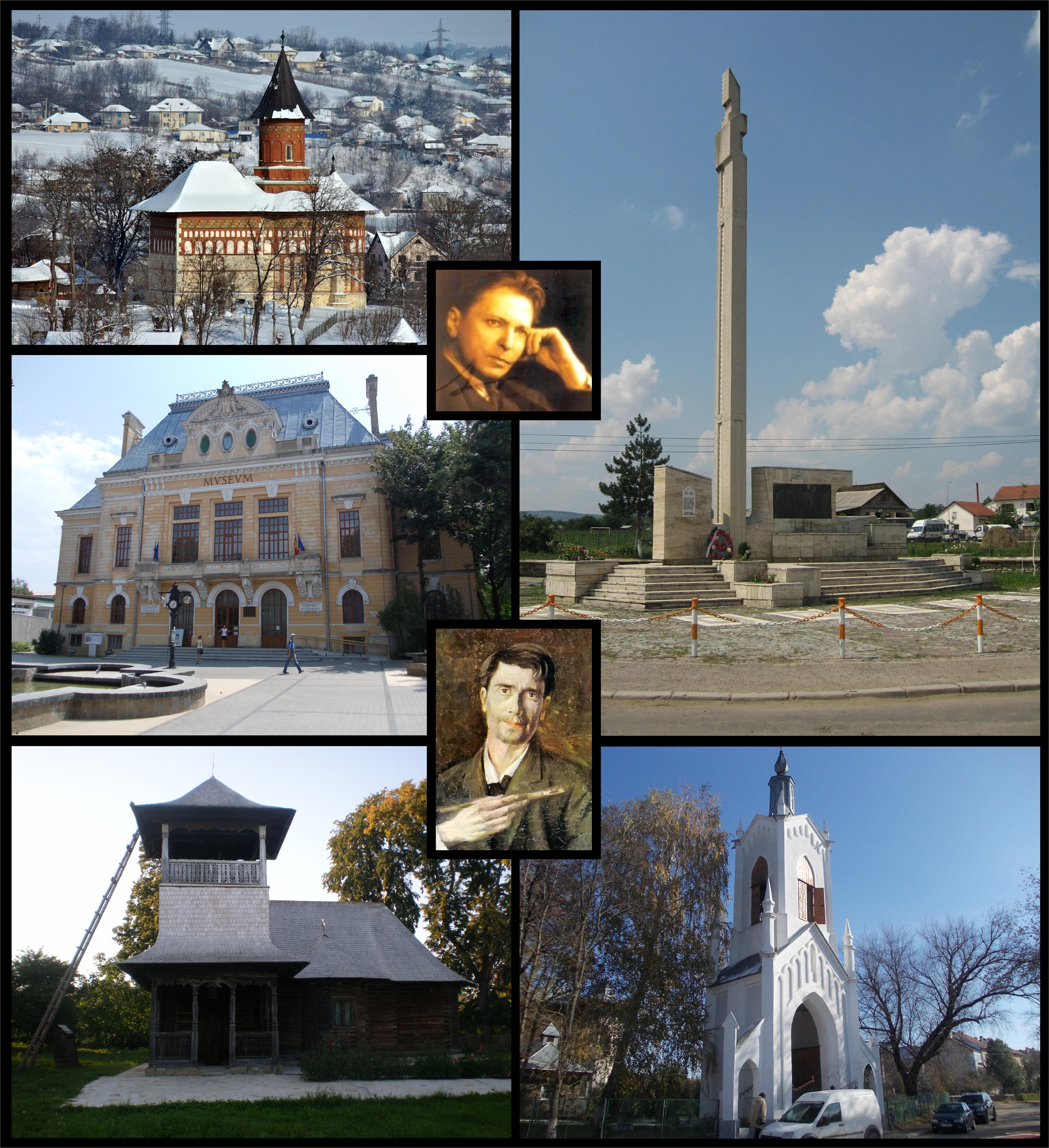
- Church of Saint Nicholas in Dorohoi; Old Prefecture of Botoșani, Wooden Church of Brăești; Monument of the 1907 peasants' revolt in Flămânzi; Gothic-style bell tower in Săveni; George Enescu; Ștefan Luchian

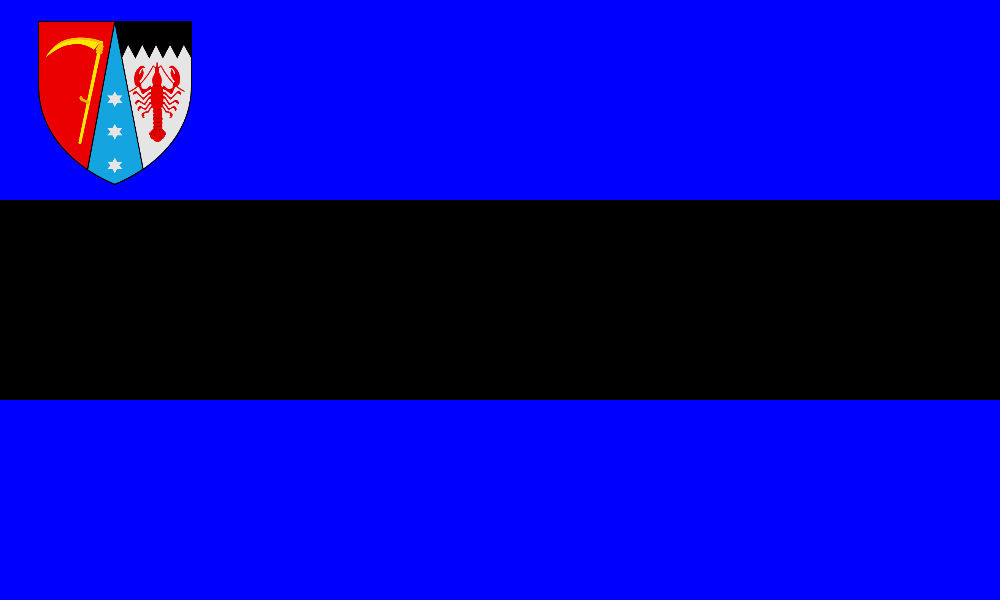
- Flag Coat of arms

- Location of Botoșani County in Romania
- Coordinates: 47.84°N 26.82°E
- Country: Romania
- Development region^{1}: Nord-Est
- Historic region: Western Moldavia
- Capital city (Reședință de județ): Botoșani

Government
  - Type: County Council
  - President of the County Council: Valeriu Iftime (PNL)
  - Prefect^{2}: Dan Nechifor

Area
  - Total: 4,986 km^{2} (1,925 sq mi)
  - Rank: 29th in Romania

Population (2021-12-01)
  - Total: 392,821
  - Rank: 22nd in Romania
  - Density: 78.78/km^{2} (204.1/sq mi)
- Time zone: UTC+2 (EET)
  - Summer (DST): UTC+3 (EEST)
- Postal Code: 71wxyz^{3}
- Area code: +40 x31^{4}
- Car Plates: BT^{5}
- GDP: US$1.726 billion (2015)
- GDP per capita: US$4,180 (2015)
- Website: County Council; County Prefecture
- ^{1} as of 2007, the Prefect is not a politician, but a public functionary. He (or she) is not allowed to be a member of a political party, and is banned to have any political activity in the first six months after the resignation (or exclusion) from the public functionary corps^{2}w, x, y, and z are digits that indicate the city, the street, part of the street, or even the building of the address^{3}x is a digit indicating the operator: 2 for the former national operator, Romtelecom, and 3 for the other ground telephone networks^{4}used on both the plates of the vehicles that operate only in the county limits (like utility vehicles, ATVs, etc.), and the ones used outside the county

Botoșani County (Romanian pronunciation: [botoˈʃanʲ]) is a county (județ) of Romania, in Western Moldavia (encompassing a few villages in neighbouring Suceava County from Bukovina to the west as well), with the county seat at Botoșani.

== Demographics ==
As of 1st of December 2021, it had a population of 392,821 and the population density was 91/km^{2}.

- Romanians – 89.0%
- Roma – 1.1%
- Ukrainians – 0.4%
- Lipovans – 0.1%
- Other ethnicities – 0.3%
- Unknown ethnicity – 9.1%

Year	County population
1948	385,236
1956	428,050 ▲
1966	452,406 ▲
1977	451,217 ▼
1992	458,904 ▲
2002	452,834 ▼
2011	412,626 ▼
2021	392,821 ▼

== Geography ==
- Botoșani County is situated between the rivers Siret and Prut, in the northeastern part of Romania, bordering Ukraine to the north and Moldova to the east. To the west and south it has borders with Suceava and Iași counties.
- It has a total area of 4,986 km^{2} (1,925 sq mi), comprising 2.1% of the Romanian territory.
- The relief is a high plain, between the valleys of the Siret and the Prut, and the latter's affluent, the Jijia River.
- It has a temperate climate, influenced by the eastern air masses of the continent.

=== Neighbours ===
- Republic of Moldova in the East – Edineț District, Glodeni District, Rîșcani District and Briceni District.
- Suceava County in the West.
- Ukraine in the North – Chernivtsi Oblast.
- Iași County in the South.

== Economy ==
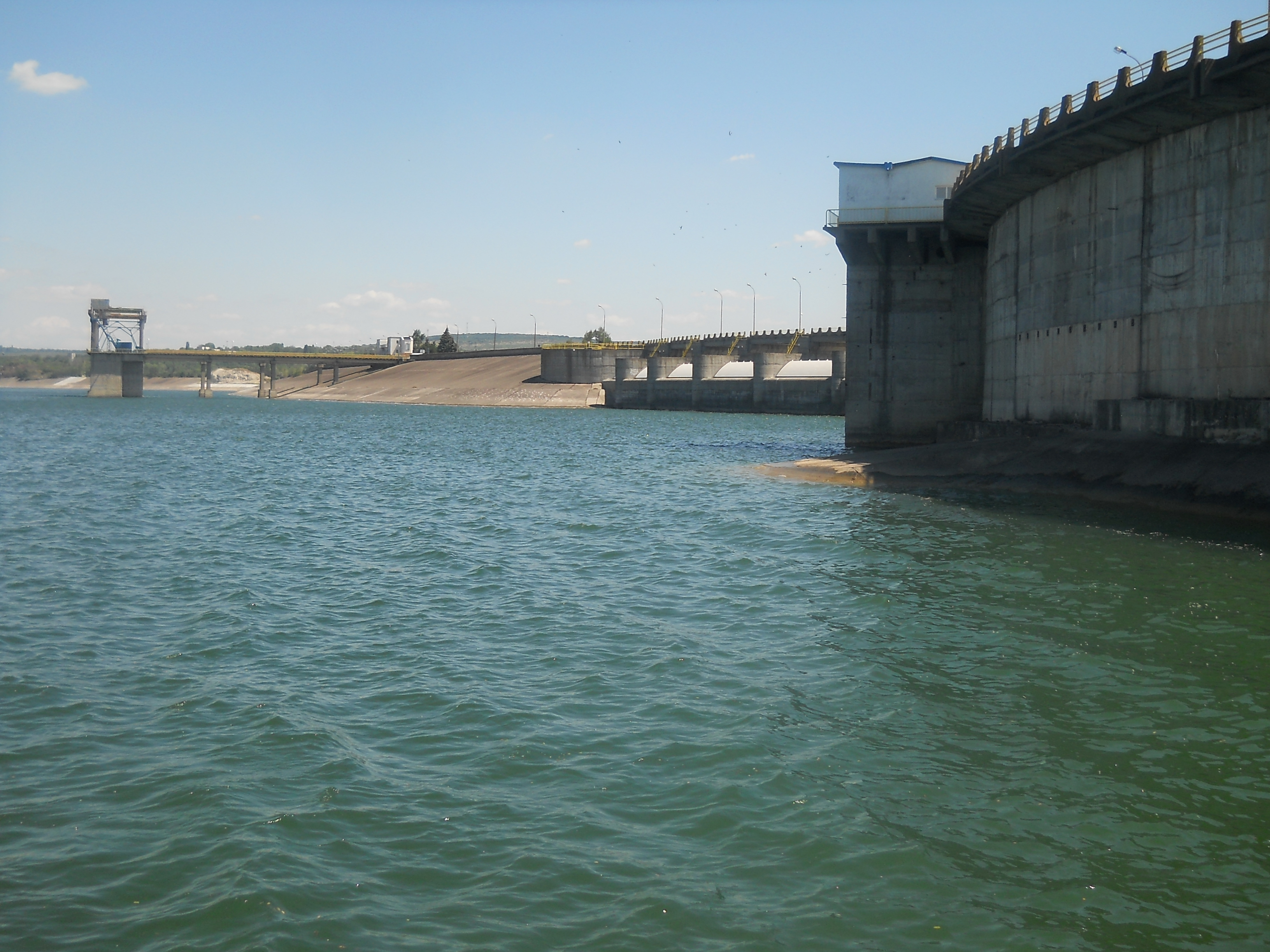
The Stânca-Costești Dam

This is a predominantly agricultural county; the main industries are the textile industry, the food industry, the electrical components industry, and the glass and porcelain industry.

The Stânca–Costești Hydroelectric Power Station is one of the largest hydroelectric power plants in Romania. Work on it started in 1973, and it was completed in 1978, at the same time as the Stânca-Costești Dam. They are both situated on the Prut River, between Stânca in Botoșani County and Costești, Rîșcani.

== Politics ==
The Botoșani County Council, renewed at the 2020 local elections, consists of 32 counsellors, with the following party composition:

Party	Seats	Current County Council
National Liberal Party (PNL)	15	
Social Democratic Party (PSD)	15	
PRO Romania (PRO)	2	

== Administrative divisions ==
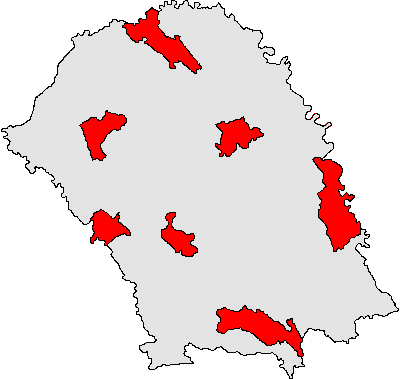

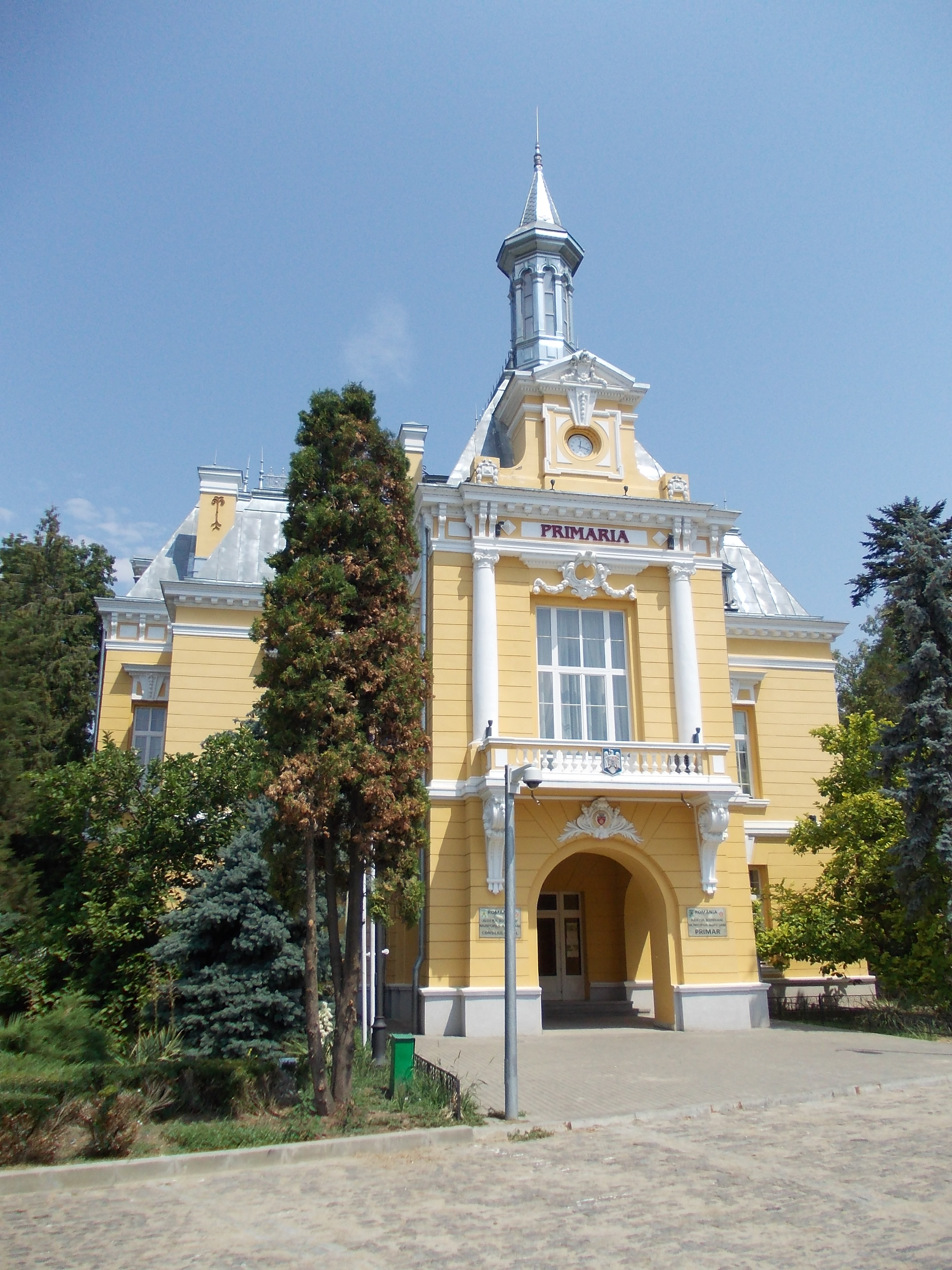
Botoșani

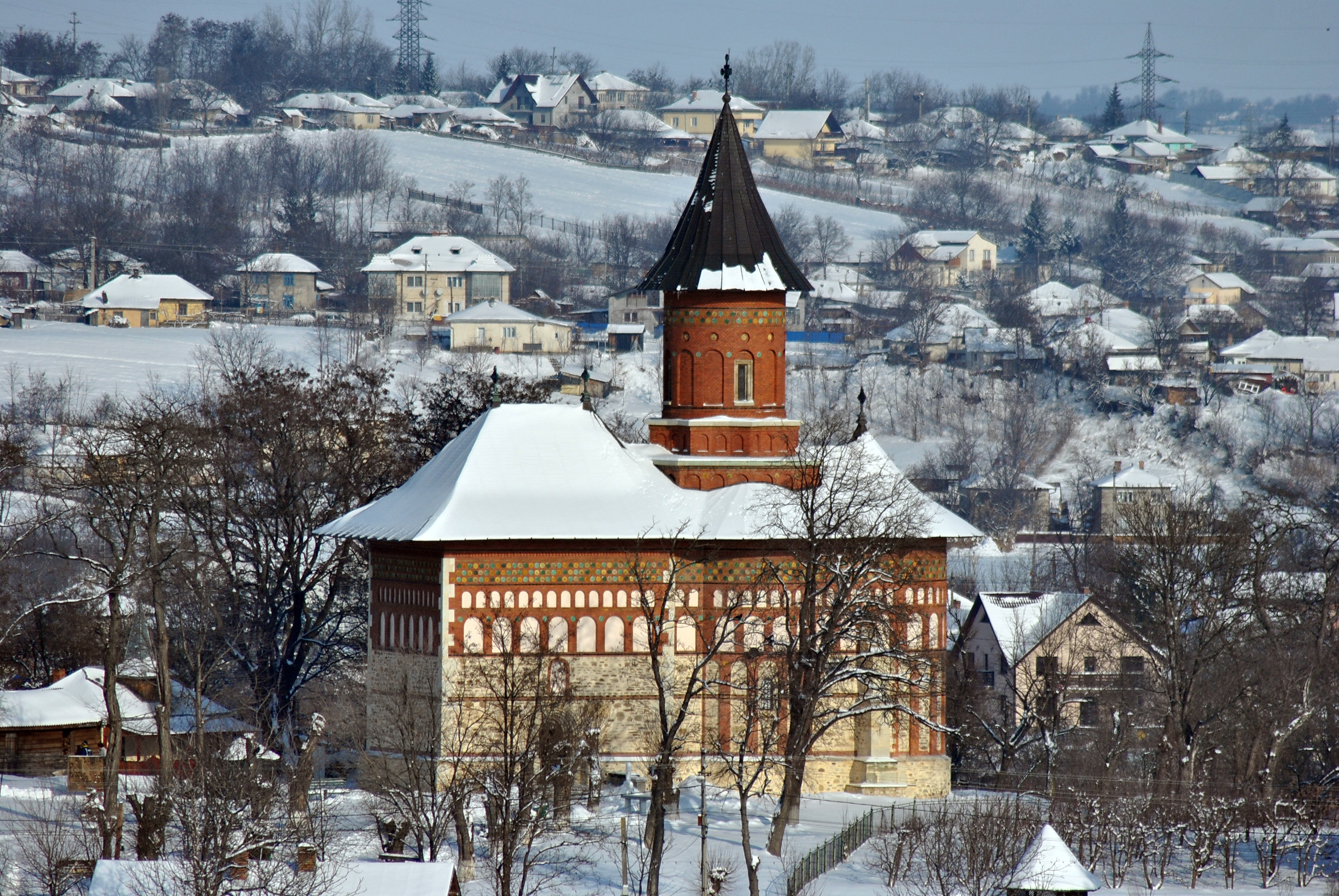
Dorohoi

Botoșani County has 2 municipalities, 5 towns and 71 communes:

=== Municipalities ===
- Botoșani – capital city; population: 106,847 (as of 2011)
- Dorohoi

=== Towns ===
- Bucecea
- Darabani
- Flămânzi
- Săveni
- Ștefănești

=== Communes ===
- Adășeni
- Albești
- Avrămeni
- Bălușeni
- Blândești
- Brăești
- Broscăuți
- Călărași
- Cândești
- Concești
- Copălău
- Cordăreni
- Corlăteni
- Corni
- Coșula
- Coțușca
- Cristești
- Cristinești
- Curtești
- Dersca
- Dângeni
- Dimăcheni
- Dobârceni
- Drăgușeni
- Durnești
- Frumușica
- George Enescu
- Gorbănești
- Havârna
- Hănești
- Hilișeu-Horia
- Hlipiceni
- Hudești
- Ibănești
- Leorda
- Lozna
- Lunca
- Manoleasa
- Mihai Eminescu
- Mihăileni
- Mihălășeni
- Mileanca
- Mitoc
- Nicșeni
- Păltiniș
- Pomârla
- Prăjeni
- Rădăuți-Prut
- Răchiți
- Răuseni
- Ripiceni
- Roma
- Românești
- Santa Mare
- Stăuceni
- Suharău
- Sulița
- Șendriceni
- Știubieni
- Todireni
- Trușești
- Tudora
- Ungureni
- Unțeni
- Văculești
- Viișoara
- Vârfu Câmpului
- Vlădeni
- Vlăsinești
- Vorniceni
- Vorona

== Historical county ==
Județul Botoșani
- County (Județ)
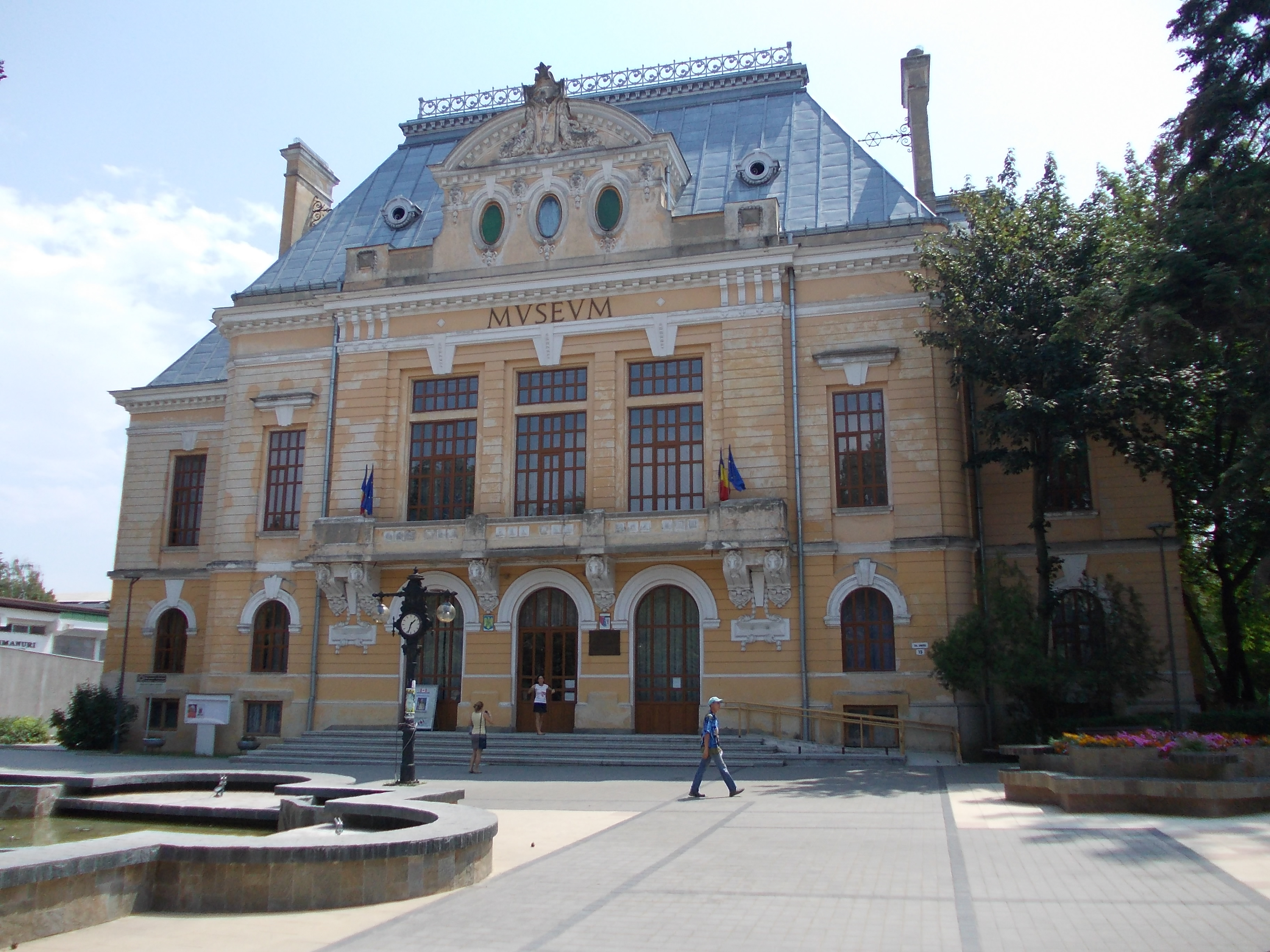
- The Botoșani County Prefecture building from the interwar period, currently the county museum.

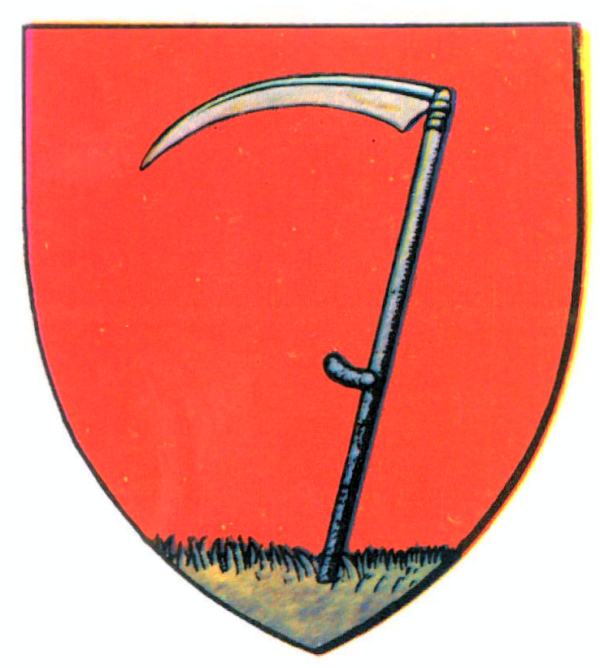
- Coat of arms

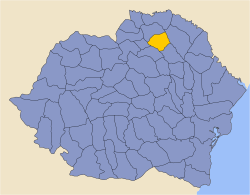
- Country: Romania
- Historic region: Moldavia
- Capital city (Reședință de județ): Botoșani

Area
  - Total: 3,077 km^{2} (1,188 sq mi)

Population (1930)
  - Total: 218,258
  - Density: 70.93/km^{2} (183.7/sq mi)
- Time zone: UTC+2 (EET)
  - Summer (DST): UTC+3 (EEST)

During the years between the world wars, the county extended over different territory than currently. It was located in the northeastern part of Romania, in the northeast of the region or Moldavia. The county included the southern part of the present county and the northern part of the current Iași County. It was bordered to the west by the counties of Suceava and Baia, to the north by Dorohoi, to the east by Bălți, and to the south with Iași.

=== Administration ===
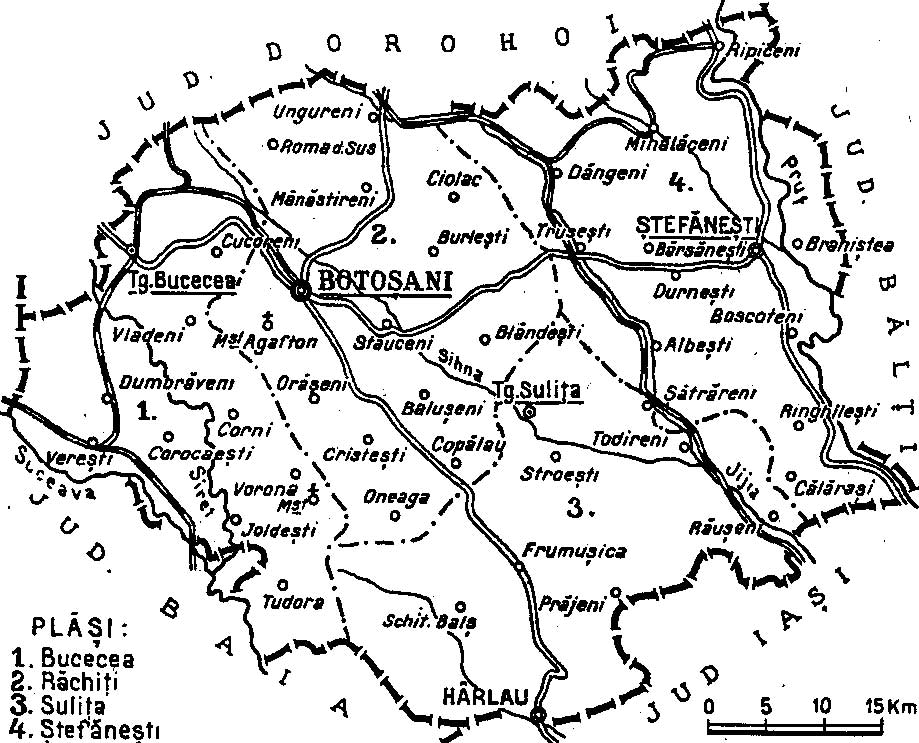
Map of Botoșani County as it existed in 1938.

In 1930, the county was divided into three districts (plăși):

1. Plasa Botoșani
2. Plasa Jijia
3. Plasa Siret

Administration was re-organized in 1938, comprising 4 districts:

1. Plasa Bucecea (with 52 villages, headquartered in Târgu Bucecea)
2. Plasa Răchiți (with 73 villages, headquartered in Botoșani)
3. Plasa Sulița (with 49 villages, headquartered in Hârlău)
4. Plasa Ștefănești (with 77 villages, headquartered in Ștefănești)

=== Population ===
According to the 1930 census data, the county population was 218,258 inhabitants, ethnically, 88.8% were Romanians, 9.0% were Jews, as well as other minorities. From the religious point of view, 89.4% were Eastern Orthodox, 9.2% Jewish, 0.7% Roman Catholic, as well as other minorities.

==== Urban population ====
In 1930, the county's urban population was 50,320 inhabitants, comprising ethnically 64.9% Romanians, 31.3% Jews, 0.9% Germans, as well as other minorities. From the religious point of view, the urban population was composed of Eastern Orthodox (64.5%), Jewish (32.3%), Roman Catholic (2.1%), as well as other minorities.

== Notable people ==
Natives of the county include:

- Grigore Antipa (1866–1944), naturalist
- Teoctist Arăpașu (1915–2007), patriarch
- Gheorghe Avramescu (1884–1945), general
- Emil Bobu (1927–2014), politician
- Demostene Botez (1893–1973), poet
- Dimitrie Brândză (1846–1895), botanist
- Mihai Eminescu (1850–1889), poet
- George Enescu (1881–1955), composer
- Nicolae Iorga (1871–1940), historian and politician
- Ștefan Luchian (1868–1916), painter
- Gheorghe Moroșanu (b. 1950), mathematician
- Dimitrie Pompeiu (1873–1954), mathematician
- Alexandru Zub (b. 1934), historian

== Archaeology ==
In 2026, archaeologists excavating the prehistoric settlement of Stăuceni-Holm uncovered a large communal building associated with the Cucuteni–Trypillia culture. The structure covers around 350 square metres, making it more than three times larger than the surrounding dwellings within a settlement of about 45 houses. Geophysical surveys and excavations revealed foundation ditches, large postholes, and a substantial clay floor, while the absence of domestic features such as cooking or storage installations distinguished it from ordinary residences. Archaeologists recovered pottery fragments, lithic remains, charred grains, and seeds of black henbane, but found no evidence of elite occupation or specialized household activities. The building is therefore interpreted as a communal or public structure that may have served as a meeting place, ceremonial space, or location for collective activities. According to the researchers, the discovery contributes to research on the social organization of Cucuteni–Trypillia communities and indicates that large communal buildings were present not only in major settlements but also in smaller communities.

== See also ==
- 2010 Romanian floods
- Miletin River
