= Soviet occupation of Bessarabia and Northern Bukovina =

1940 Soviet annexation of present-day Moldova and parts of Ukraine

- Part of World War II
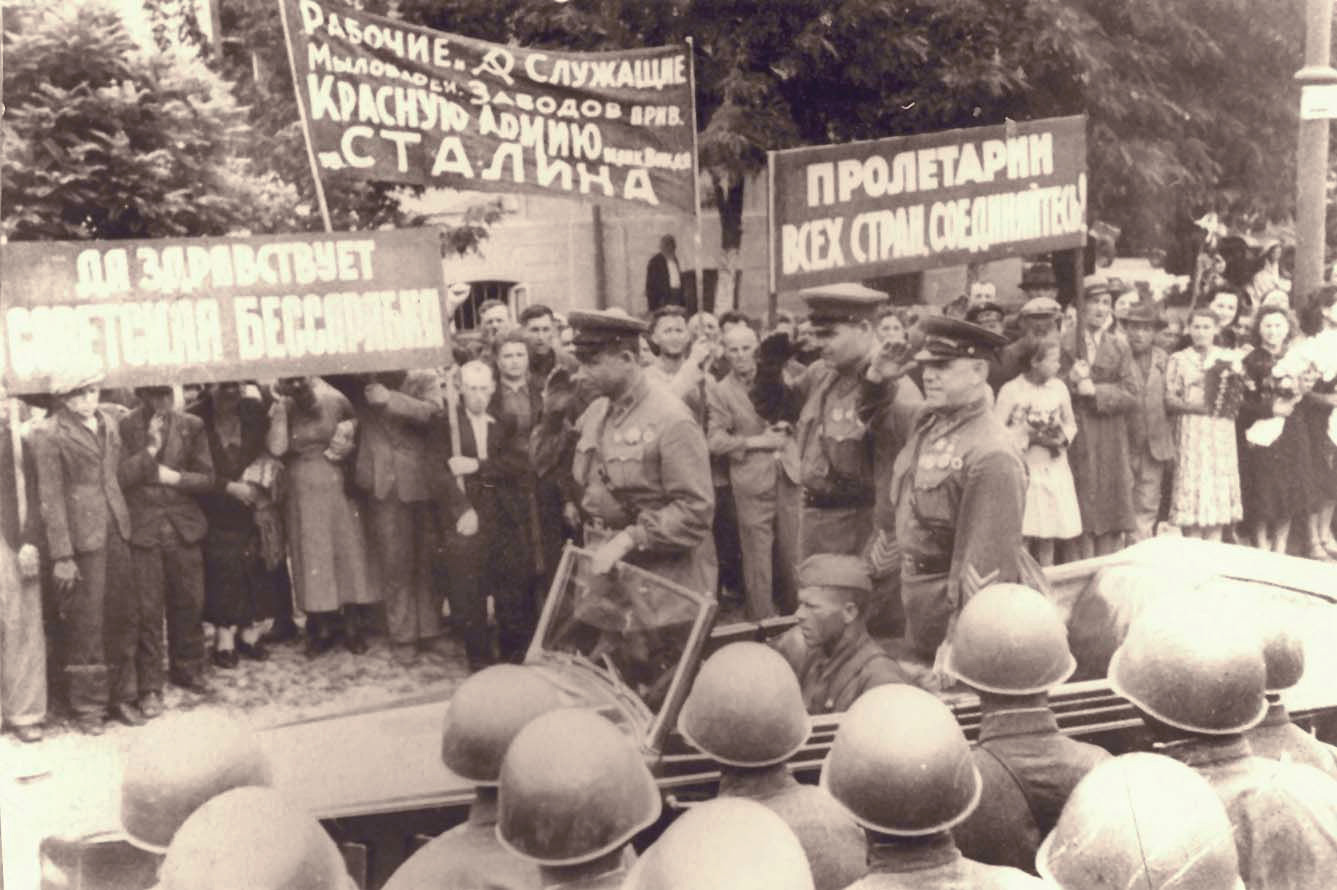
- Soviet parade in Chișinău, 4 July 1940
Date	28 June – 3 July 1940
Location	Bessarabia, Northern Bukovina and Hertsa region, Kingdom of Romania
Result	Soviet victory: Moldavian SSR established; Northern Bukovina, Northern Bessarabia, Budjak and Hertsa region annexed into the Ukrainian SSR

Belligerents
Romania	Soviet Union

Strength
55–60 infantry divisions; 1 tank company	32 infantry divisions; 2 mechanized divisions; 6 cavalry divisions; 11 armored brigades; 3 airborne brigades; 34 artillery regiments

Casualties and losses
40,000 captured	29 killed; 69 wounded

Between 28 June and 3 July 1940, the Soviet Union occupied Bessarabia, Northern Bukovina and the Hertsa region, following an ultimatum made to Romania on 26 June 1940 that threatened the use of force. Those regions, with a total area of 50,762 km^{2} (19,599 sq mi) and a population of 3,776,309 inhabitants, were incorporated into the Soviet Union. On 26 October 1940, six Romanian islands on the Chilia branch of the Danube, with an area of 23.75 km^{2} (9.17 sq mi), were also occupied by the Soviet Army.

The Soviet Union had planned to accomplish the annexation with a full-scale invasion, but the Romanian government, responding to the Soviet ultimatum delivered on 26 June, agreed to withdraw from the territories to avoid a military conflict. The use of force had been made illegal by the Conventions for the Definition of Aggression in July 1933, but from an international legal standpoint, the new status of the annexed territories was eventually based on a formal agreement through which Romania consented to the retrocession of Bessarabia and cession of Northern Bukovina. As it was not mentioned in the ultimatum, the annexation of the Hertsa region was not consented to by Romania, and the same is true of the subsequent Soviet occupation of the Danube islands. On 24 June, Nazi Germany, which had acknowledged the Soviet interest in Bessarabia in a secret protocol to the 1939 Molotov–Ribbentrop Pact, had been made aware prior to the planned ultimatum but did not inform the Romanian authorities and was unwilling to provide support. On 22 June, France, a guarantor of Romanian borders, fell to Nazi advances. This is considered to be an important factor in the Soviets' decision to issue the ultimatum. The Soviet invasion of Bukovina in 1940 violated the Molotov-Ribbentrop Pact, since it went beyond the Soviet sphere of influence that had been agreed with the Axis.

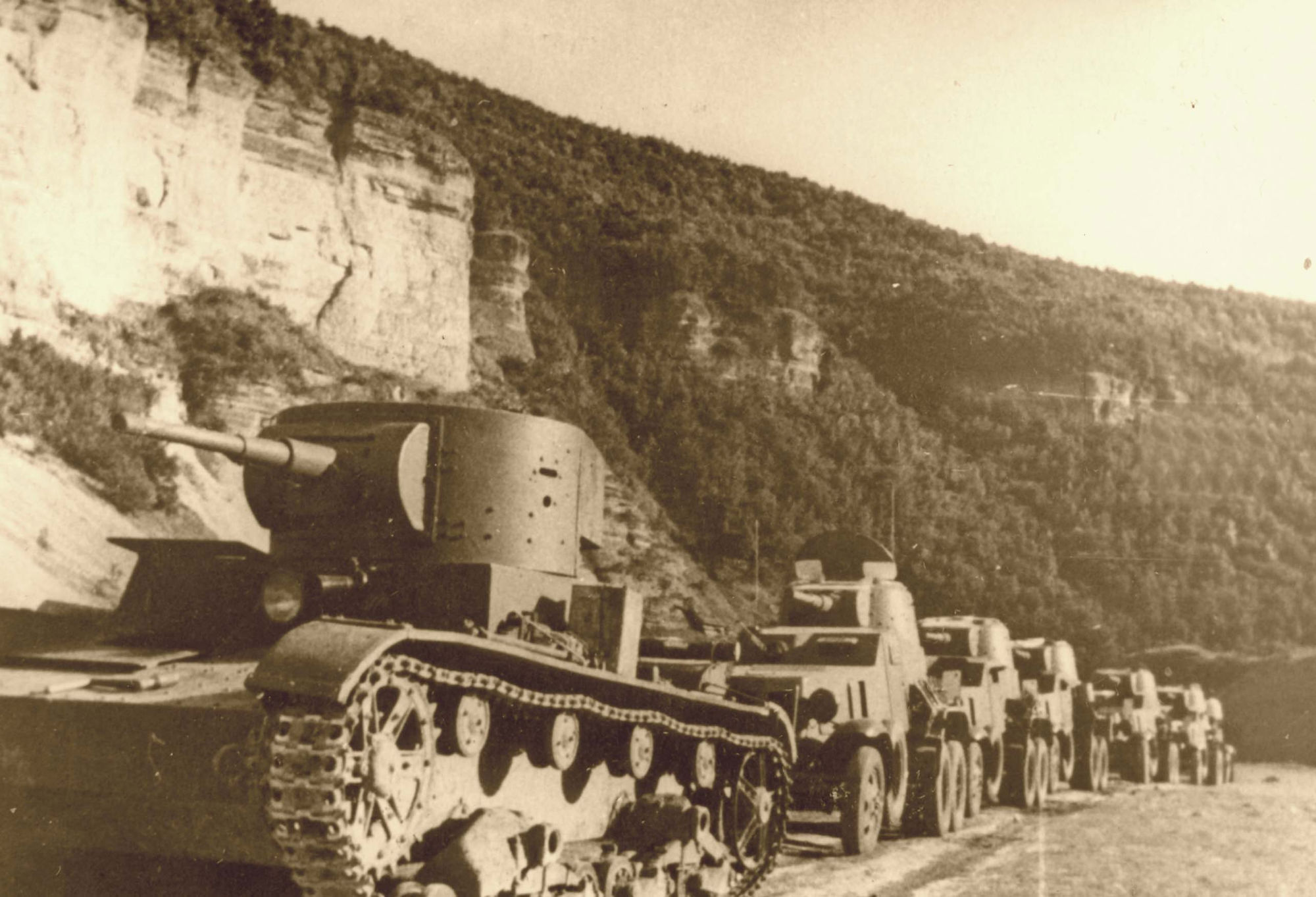
A column of Soviet armored vehicles entering Bessarabia, June 1940

On 2 August 1940, the Moldavian Soviet Socialist Republic was proclaimed as a constituent republic of the Soviet Union, encompassing most of Bessarabia and part of the Moldavian Autonomous Soviet Socialist Republic, an autonomous republic of the Ukrainian Soviet Socialist Republic on the left bank of the Dniester (now the breakaway Transnistria). The Hertsa region and the regions inhabited by Slavic majorities (Northern Bukovina, Northern and Southern Bessarabia) were included in the Ukrainian SSR. A period of political persecution, including executions, deportations to labour camps and arrests, occurred during the Soviet administration.

In July 1941, Romanian and German troops occupied Bessarabia, Northern Bukovina and Hertsa during the Axis invasion of the Soviet Union. A military administration was established, and the region's Jewish population was executed on the spot or deported to Transnistria, where large numbers were killed. In August 1944, during the Soviet Second Jassy–Kishinev Offensive, the Axis war effort on the Eastern Front collapsed. The coup of 23 August 1944 caused the Romanian army to cease resisting the Soviet advance and to join the fight against Germany. Soviet forces advanced from Bessarabia into Romania, captured much of its standing army as prisoners-of-war and occupied the country. On 12 September 1944, Romania signed the Moscow Armistice with the Allies. The Armistice and the subsequent peace treaty of 1947 confirmed the Soviet-Romanian border as it was on 1 January 1941.

Bessarabia, Northern Bukovina and Hertsa remained part of the Soviet Union until it collapsed in 1991, when they became part of the newly independent states of Moldova and Ukraine. The Declaration of Independence of Moldova of 27 August 1991 declared the Soviet occupation illegal.

== Background ==
As a historical region, Bessarabia was the eastern part of the Principality of Moldavia. In 1812, under the terms of the Treaty of Bucharest, the region was ceded by the Ottoman Empire, to which Moldavia was a vassal state, to the Russian Empire.

=== Interwar Soviet-Romanian relations ===
Interwar Romania (1920–1940)

The Bessarabian question was both political and national in nature. According to the 1897 census, Bessarabia, then a guberniya of the Russian Empire, had a population that was 47.6% Romanians, 19.6% Ukrainians, 8% Russians, 11.8% Jews, 5.3% Bulgarians, 3.1% Germans and 2.9% Gagauz. The figures showed a strong decrease in the proportion of Moldovans and Romanians compared to the census of 1817, which had been conducted shortly after the Russian Empire annexed Bessarabia in 1812. In that survey, Moldovans and Romanians represented 86% of the population. The decrease seen in the census of 1897 was caused by the Russian policies of settling of other nationalities and of Russification in Bessarabia.

During the 1917 Russian Revolution, a national assembly was formed in Bessarabia to manage the province. The assembly, known locally as Sfatul Țării, initiated several national and social reforms, and on 2/15 December 1917, it declared the Moldavian Democratic Republic an autonomous republic within the Russian Federative Democratic Republic.

The Rumcherod, an Odessa-based soviet council, loyal to the Petrograd Soviet and formed by late December, decided to take actions against the authority of Sfatul Țării. Its Front Section (Frontotdel), made up of Bolsheviks was sent to Chisinau and on 1/14 January 1918 it captured strategic locations and buildings. The Bolsheviks attempted to take power for themselves by arresting elected deputies, abolishing the Sfatul Țării and replacing it with a self-proclaimed Moldavian Soviet. None of its members were ethnic Moldavian, in contrast with Sfatul Țării where the ethnic Moldovans were about 70%. With the consent of the Allies and based on calls from more sources for a Romanian military intervention, Romanian troops entered Bessarabia in early January 1918 and, by February, had pushed the Soviets over the Dniester. In the wake of the intervention, Soviet Russia broke off diplomatic relations with Romania and confiscated the Romanian Treasure, which was stored in Moscow for safekeeping. To calm the situation, Entente representatives in Iași issued a guarantee that the presence of the Romanian Army was only a temporary military measure for the stabilisation of the front, without further affecting the political life of the region. In January 1918, the Ukrainian People's Republic declared its independence from Russia, which left Bessarabia physically isolated from the Petrograd government and led to the declaration of independence of the Moldavian Republic on 24 January/5 February. Following several Soviet protests, on 20 February/5 March, the Romanian prime minister, General Alexandru Averescu, signed a treaty with the Soviet representative in Odessa, Christian Rakovsky, which provided that Romanian troops be evacuated from Bessarabia within two months in exchange for the repatriation of Romanian prisoners-of-war held by the Rumcherod. After the White Army forced the Soviets to withdraw from Odessa, and the German Empire agreed to the Romanian annexation of Bessarabia in a secret agreement (part of the Buftea Peace Treaty) on 5/18 March, Romanian diplomacy repudiated the treaty by claiming that the Soviets were unable to fulfill their obligations.

On 27 March/9 April 1918, the Sfatul Țării voted for the Union of Bessarabia with Romania, conditional upon the fulfilment of an agrarian reform. There were 86 votes for union, 3 votes against, 36 deputies abstaining, and 13 deputies absent. The vote is regarded as controversial by several historians, including Romanian ones such as Cristina Petrescu and Sorin Alexandrescu. On 18 April Georgy Chicherin, the Soviet Commissar for Foreign Affairs, sent a note of protest against the incorporation of Bessarabia into Romania.

Back in August 1916, the Entente and the neutral Romania signed a secret convention that stipulated Romania would join the war against the Central Powers in exchange for several territories of Austria-Hungary, such as Bukovina. During the end of World War I, national movements of the Romanians and the Ukrainians began to emerge in the province, but both movements had conflicting aims, each seeking to unite the province with their national state. Thus, on 25 October 1918, a Ukrainian National Committee, gaining the upper hand in Czernowitz, declared Northern Bukovina, populated by a Ukrainian majority, part of the West Ukrainian People's Republic. On 27 October the Romanians followed suit, proclaiming the whole region united with Romania, and calling in Romanian troops. The Romanian intervention quickly established the Romanian Assembly as the dominant force, and on 28 November, a Congress of the Romanians, Germans, and Poles voted to unite with Romania. The representatives of the Ukrainian and Jewish populations boycotted the Congress, and the struggle between ethnic factions continued for several months.

During the Russian Civil War, the Soviet governments of Ukraine and Russia, prompted by the unrest in Bessarabia from the Romanian occupation, issued a joint ultimatum to Romania on 1 May 1919, for its withdrawal from Bessarabia, and the next day, Christian Rakovsky, the chairman of the Ukrainian Soviet government, issued another ultimatum for the withdrawal of Romanian troops from Bukovina as well. The Red Army pushed the Romanians over the Dniester, and a Bessarabian Soviet Socialist Republic was proclaimed. The ultimatum also came in the context of the Hungarian Soviet Republic, with the Soviets hoping to prevent a Romanian intervention in Hungary. A massive rebellion in Ukraine prevented further Soviet advances. Soviet Russia would continue its policy of non-recognition of Romanian sovereignty over Bessarabia, which it considered Romanian-occupied territory, until 1940.

During the negotiations before the Treaty of Paris, the United States' representative asked for a plebiscite to be held in Bessarabia to decide its future, but the proposal was rejected by the head of the Romanian delegation, Ion I. C. Brătianu, who claimed such an undertaking would allow the distribution of Bolshevik propaganda in Bessarabia and Romania. A plebiscite was also requested at the Peace Conference by the White Russians, only to be rejected again. The Soviets would continue to press for a plebiscite during the following decade, only to be dismissed every time by the Romanian government.

Romanian sovereignty over Bessarabia was de jure recognized by the United Kingdom, France, Italy, and Japan in the Bessarabian Treaty, signed on 28 October 1920. Soviet Russia and Ukraine promptly notified Romania that they did not recognize the treaty's validity and did not consider themselves bound by it. Ultimately, Japan failed to ratify the treaty and so it never came into force, leaving Romania without a valid international act to justify its possession of Bessarabia. The United States refused to discuss territorial changes in the former Russian Empire without the participation of a Russian government. Thus, it declined to recognize the incorporation of Bessarabia into Romania, and, unlike its position of recognizing the independence of the Baltic States, it insisted that Bessarabia was a territory under Romanian military occupation and incorporated the Bessarabian emigration quota into the Russian one in 1923. In 1933, the US government tacitly included the Bessarabian emigration quota into that of Romania, an act that was considered a de facto recognition by Romanian diplomacy. However, during World War II, the US argued it had never recognized Bessarabia's union with Romania.

In 1924, after the failure of the Tatarbunary Uprising, the Soviet government created a Moldavian Autonomous Soviet Socialist Republic on the left bank of the Dniester river within the Ukrainian SSR. The Romanian government saw that as a threat and a possible staging ground for a communist invasion of Romania. Throughout the 1920s, Romania considered itself a pillar in the cordon sanitaire, the policy of containment of the Bolshevik threat, and avoided direct relations with the Soviet Union.

On 27 August 1928, both Romania and the Soviet Union signed and ratified the Kellogg–Briand Pact, renouncing war as an instrument of national policy. On 9 February 1929, the Soviet Union signed a protocol with its western neighbors, Estonia, Latvia, Poland, and Romania, confirming adherence to the terms of the Pact. In signing the Pact, the contracting parties agreed to condemn war as a recourse to solving conflict, to renounce it as an instrument of policy and to agree that all conflicts and disputes would only by peaceful means. At the time, the Soviet ambassador, Maxim Litvinov, made it clear that neither the pact nor the protocol meant renunciation of Soviet rights over the "territories occupied by Romanians". On 3 July 1933, Romania and the Soviet Union were signatories the London Convention for the Definition of Aggression, Article II of which defined several forms of aggression: "There shall be recognized as an aggressor that State which shall be the first to have committed one of the following actions: First—a declaration of war on another State. Second—invasion by armed forces of the territory of another State even without a declaration of war. [...]" and "No political, military, economic or other considerations may serve as an excuse or justification for the aggression referred to in Article II."

In January 1932 in Riga and in September 1932 in Geneva, Soviet-Romanian negotiations were held as a prelude to a non-aggression treaty, and on 9 June 1934, diplomatic relations were established between both countries. On 21 July 1936, Litvinov and Nicolae Titulescu, the Soviet and Romanian Ministers of Foreign Affairs, agreed upon a draft of a Mutual Assistance Pact. It was sometimes interpreted as a non-aggression treaty, which would de facto recognize the existing Soviet-Romanian border. The protocol stipulated that any common Romanian-Soviet action should be approved by France ahead of time. In negotiating with the Soviets for the agreement, Titulescu was highly criticized by the Romanian far right. The protocol was to be signed in September 1936, but Titulescu was dismissed in August 1936, leading the Soviet side to declare the agreement null and void. Subsequently, no further attempts were made to reach a political rapprochement between Romania and the Soviet Union. Moreover, by 1937, Litvinov and the Soviet press revived the dormant claim over Bessarabia.

=== Molotov–Ribbentrop Pact and aftermath ===
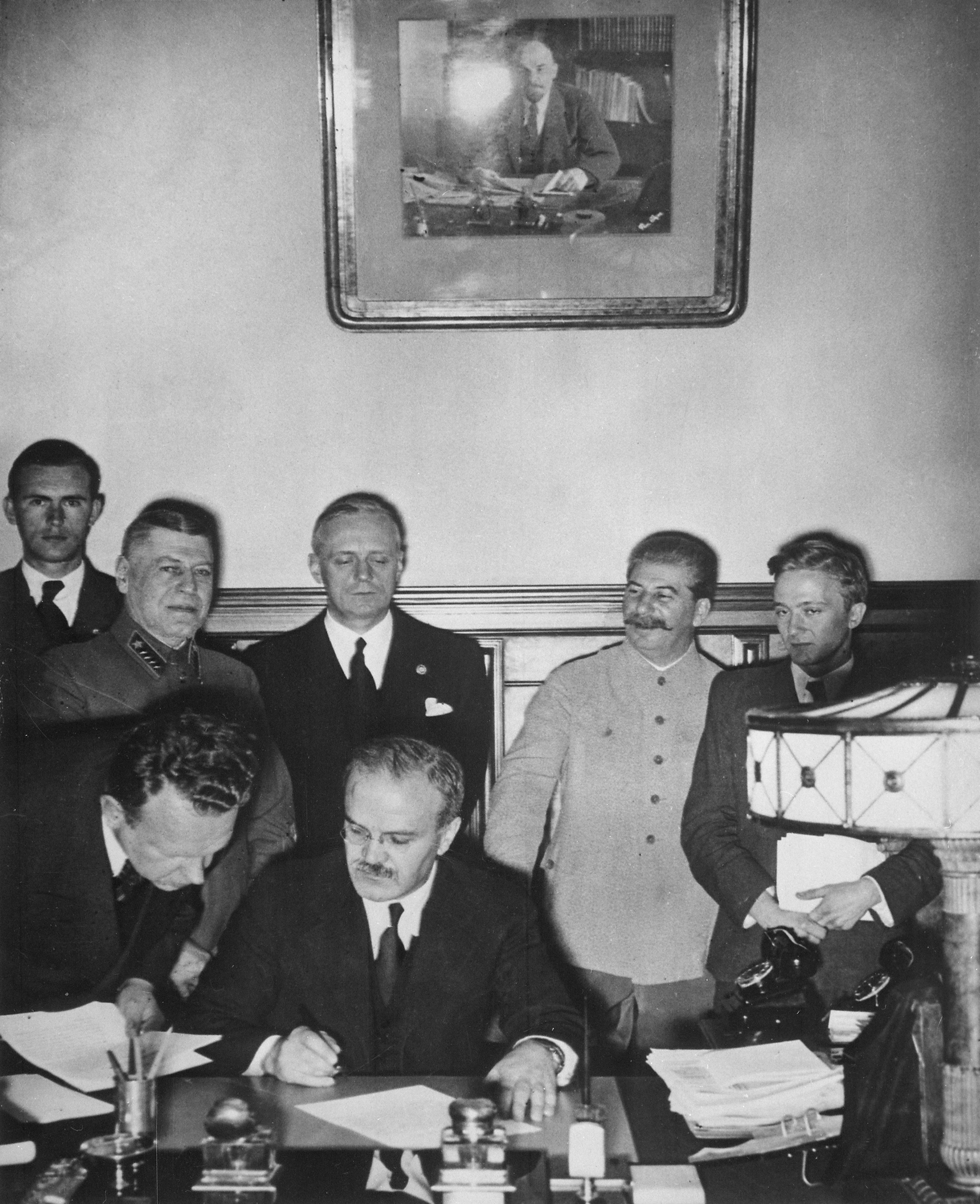
Soviet Foreign Minister Vyacheslav Molotov signs the Molotov–Ribbentrop Pact. Behind him are (left) German Foreign Minister Joachim von Ribbentrop and Soviet Premier Joseph Stalin.

On 23 August 1939, the Soviet Union and Nazi Germany signed the Molotov–Ribbentrop Pact, a non-aggression treaty that contained an additional secret protocol with maps in which a demarcation line through Eastern Europe was drawn and divided it into the German and Soviet interest zones. Bessarabia was among the regions assigned to the Soviet sphere of interest by the Pact. Article III of its Secret Additional Protocol stated:

With regard to Southeastern Europe attention is called by the Soviet side to its interest in Bessarabia. The German side declares its complete political disinterestedness in these areas.

On 29 March 1940, Molotov declared on the Sixth session of the Supreme Soviet: "We do not have a pact of non-aggression with Romania. This is due to the presence of an unsolved issue, the issue of Bessarabia, the seizure of which the Soviet Union never recognized although it never raised the issue of returning it by military means". That was seen as a threat to Romania.

=== International context ===
Planned and actual divisions of Eastern Europe, according to the Molotov–Ribbentrop Pact

Animation of the European Theatre

Assured by the Molotov–Ribbentrop Pact of Soviet non-interference, Germany started World War II one week later by invading Poland from the west on 1 September 1939. The Soviet Union attacked Poland from the east on 17 September, and by 6 October, Poland had fallen. Romanian Prime Minister Armand Călinescu, a strong supporter of Poland in its conflict with Germany, was assassinated on 21 September by elements of the far-right Iron Guard with Nazi support. Romania remained formally neutral in the conflict but aided Poland by providing access to Allied military supplies from the Black Sea to the Polish border and also a route for the Polish government and army to withdraw after their defeat. The Polish government also preferred a formally neutral Romania to ensure the safety from German bombardments of supplies transported through Romanian territory. (See also Romanian Bridgehead.)

On 2 June 1940, Germany informed the Romanian government that to receive territorial guarantees, Romania should consider negotiations with the Soviet Union.

From 14 to 17 June 1940, the Soviet Union gave ultimatum notes to Lithuania, Estonia and Latvia, and when the ultimata were satisfied, it used the bases that it had gained to occupy those territories.

The Fall of France on 22 June and the subsequent British retreat from the Continent rendered the assurances of assistance to Romania meaningless.

== Political and military developments ==
=== Soviet preparations ===
By directives OV/583 and OV/584 of the Soviet People Commissariat of Defense, military units of the Odessa Military District were ordered into battle-ready state in the spring of 1940. Soviet troops were concentrated along the Romanian border between 15 April and 10 June 1940. To co-ordinate the efforts of the Kiev and Odessa military districts in the preparation of action against Romania, the Soviet Army created the Southern Front under General Georgy Zhukov, which was composed of the 5th, 9th and 12th Armies. The Southern Front had 32 infantry divisions, 2 motorized infantry divisions, 6 cavalry divisions, 11 tank brigades, 3 paratrooper brigades, 30 artillery regiments and smaller auxiliary units.

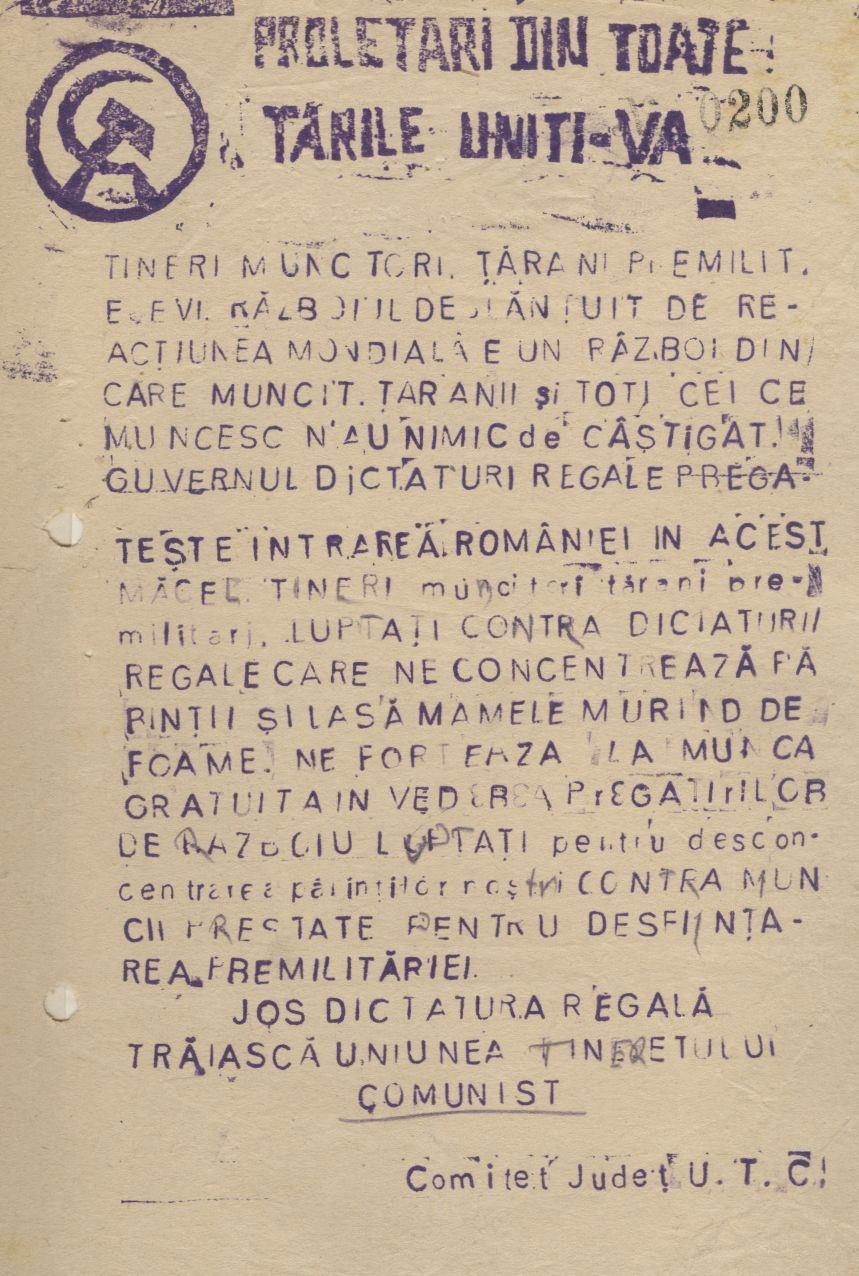
Union of Communist Youth manifesto against the National Renaissance Front and for "avoiding war", put out in Bessarabia in 1940

On 25 June, the Soviet Southern Front received a directive:

1. The soldiery and the bourgeois-capitalist clique of Romania, preparing provocationary acts against the USSR, concentrated on the borders of the USSR large armed forces, increased the border posts to 100 persons, enlarged the number of commandos sent to guard the border and is with enforced tempo constructing defense facilities on its border and the close rear.
2. The commander of the Southern Front set the troops of the Southern district the task to: a) clear of mines, seize and hold bridges over the borderline rivers; b) firmly defend state borders in the front of the 12th army where the troops of the Workers' and Peasants' Red Army are going to act; c) to provide the Workers' and Peasants' Red Army with guides; d) to cleanse the rear of the 12th army from possible pockets of enemy in the near-border belt of Romania.

Two action plans were devised. The first plan was prepared for if Romania did not agree to evacuate Bessarabia and Bukovina. The Soviet 12th Army was to strike southward along the Prut River towards Iași while the Soviet 9th Army was to strike westwards, south of Chișinău towards Huși. The objective of the plan was to surround the Romanian troops in the Bălți–Iași area.

The second plan took into consideration the possibility that Romania would agree to Soviet demands and evacuate its military forces. In such a situation, Soviet troops were given the mission to quickly reach the Prut River and oversee the evacuation of Romanian troops. The first plan was taken as the default course of action. Along the portions of the border in which the offensive was planned to take place, the Soviets prepared at least a triple superiority of men and materiel.

=== Soviet ultimatum ===
On 26 June 1940, at 22:00, Soviet People's Commissar Vyacheslav Molotov presented an ultimatum note to Gheorghe Davidescu, the Romanian plenipotentiary minister to Moscow, in which the Soviet Union demanded the evacuation of the Romanian military and civil administration from Bessarabia and the northern part of Bukovina. The Soviets stressed their sense of urgency: "Now that the military weakness of the USSR is a thing of the past, and the international situation that was created requires the rapid solution of the items inherited from the past, in order to fix the basis of a solid peace between countries...". The German Minister of Foreign Affairs, Joachim von Ribbentrop, was informed by the Soviets of their intentions to send an ultimatum to Romania regarding Bessarabia and Bukovina on 24 June 1940. In the ensuing diplomatic co-ordination, Ribbentrop expressed mainly concern for the fate of the ethnic Germans in both provinces, claimed the number of Germans in Bessarabia to be 100,000, and affirmed that Soviet demands regarding Bukovina were new. He also pointed out that Germany had strong economic interests in the rest of Romania.^{[a]}

The text of the ultimatum note sent to Romania on 26 June 1940, incorrectly stated that Bessarabia was populated mainly by Ukrainians: "[...] centuries-old union of Bessarabia, populated mainly by Ukrainians, with the Ukrainian Soviet Republic". The Soviet government demanded the northern part of Bukovina as a "minor reparation for the enormous loss inflicted on the Soviet Union and Bessarabia's population by 22 years of Romanian reign over Bessarabia" and because its "fate is linked mainly with Soviet Ukraine by the community of its historical fate, and by the community of language and ethnic composition". Northern Bukovina had some historical connections with Galicia, annexed by the Soviet Union in 1939 as part of its invasion of Poland, in the sense that both had been part of Austria-Hungary from the second half of the 18th century to 1918. Northern Bukovina was inhabited by a compact Ukrainian population, which outnumbered Romanians, but Bessarabia was regarded as having a Romanian majority even though most of the population adopted a "Moldavian" identity.

On the morning of 27 June, a mobilization of Romanian troops started. In the early hours of 27 June, King Carol II had a meeting with his prime minister, Gheorghe Tătărescu, and his minister for external affairs, Ion Gigurtu, and he summoned the ambassadors of Italy and Germany. Carol communicated his wish to stand against the Soviet Union and asked for their countries to influence Hungary and Bulgaria in the hopes of not declaring war against Romania and to reclaim Transylvania and Southern Dobruja. Stating that it would be "in the name of peace" to accede to Soviet demands, the ambassadors urged the King to stand down.

On 27 June, Molotov declared that if the Romanians rejected Soviet demands, the Soviet troops would cross the border. Molotov gave the Romanian government 24 hours to respond to the ultimatum.

On the same day, the Romanian government replied by suggesting it would agree to "immediate negotiations on a wide range of questions". The Soviets considered the Romanian government's response to be "imprecise" because it did not directly accept the immediate transfer of Bessarabia and Northern Bukovina. On 27 June, a second Soviet ultimatum note put forward a specific time frame that requested the evacuation of the Romanian government from Bessarabia and Northern Bukovina within four days. It stated the Soviet military's intention to enter the Bessarabian cities of Chișinău and Cetatea Albă and the Bukovinian city of Cernăuți.

On the morning of 28 June 1940, following advice by both Germany and Italy, the Romanian government, led by Gheorghe Tătărescu, under the semi-authoritarian rule of Carol II, agreed to submit to the Soviet demands. Soviet forces also occupied the Hertsa region, part of the Romanian Old Kingdom, which was in neither Bessarabia nor Bukovina. The Soviets said that was "probably a military error". As well, the final border line cut off about 1.7 km^{2} (0.66 sq mi) from Maramureș, as the extending westerly border line ran south of the old historical border between Maramureș, Bukovina, and Galicia, which extended to the north to the Muncel River and border marker N542 (as seen on Cold War Soviet military cartography maps), a tributary of Pârcălab River, which flows into the Ceremuș River.

The decision to accept the Soviet ultimatum and to start a "withdrawal" (avoiding the use of ceding) from Bessarabia and Northern Bukovina was deliberated upon by the Romanian Crown Council during the night of 27–28 June. The second (decisive) vote outcome, according to the journal of King Carol II, was:

- Reject the ultimatum: Ștefan Ciobanu, Silviu Dragomir, Victor Iamandi, Nicolae Iorga, Traian Pop, Ernest Urdăreanu
- Accept the ultimatum: Petre Andrei, Constantin Angelescu, Constantin Argetoianu, Ernest Ballif, Aurelian Bentoiu, Mircea Cancicov, Ioan Christu, Mitiță Constantinescu, Mihail Ghelmegeanu, Ion Gigurtu, Constantin C. Giurescu, Nicolae Hortolomei, Ioan Ilcuș (minister of defence), Ion Macovei, Gheorghe Mironescu, Radu Portocală, Mihai Ralea, Victor Slăvescu, Gheorghe Tătărescu (prime-minister), Florea Țenescu (chief of the General Staff of the Army)
- Abstained: Victor Antonescu.

The same night, Carol II also convinced Alexandru Vaida-Voevod to be sworn in as minister. Vaida, along with all of the above, signed the final Crown Council recommendation in which Carol II ordered the army to stand down.

=== Romanian withdrawal ===
The division of Bukovina after 28 June 1940. The region labelled as Herța (Hertsa) and the land in white just to the right of Northern Bukovina between the rivers Nistru (Dniester) and Prut (Prut) were also taken by the Soviet Union.

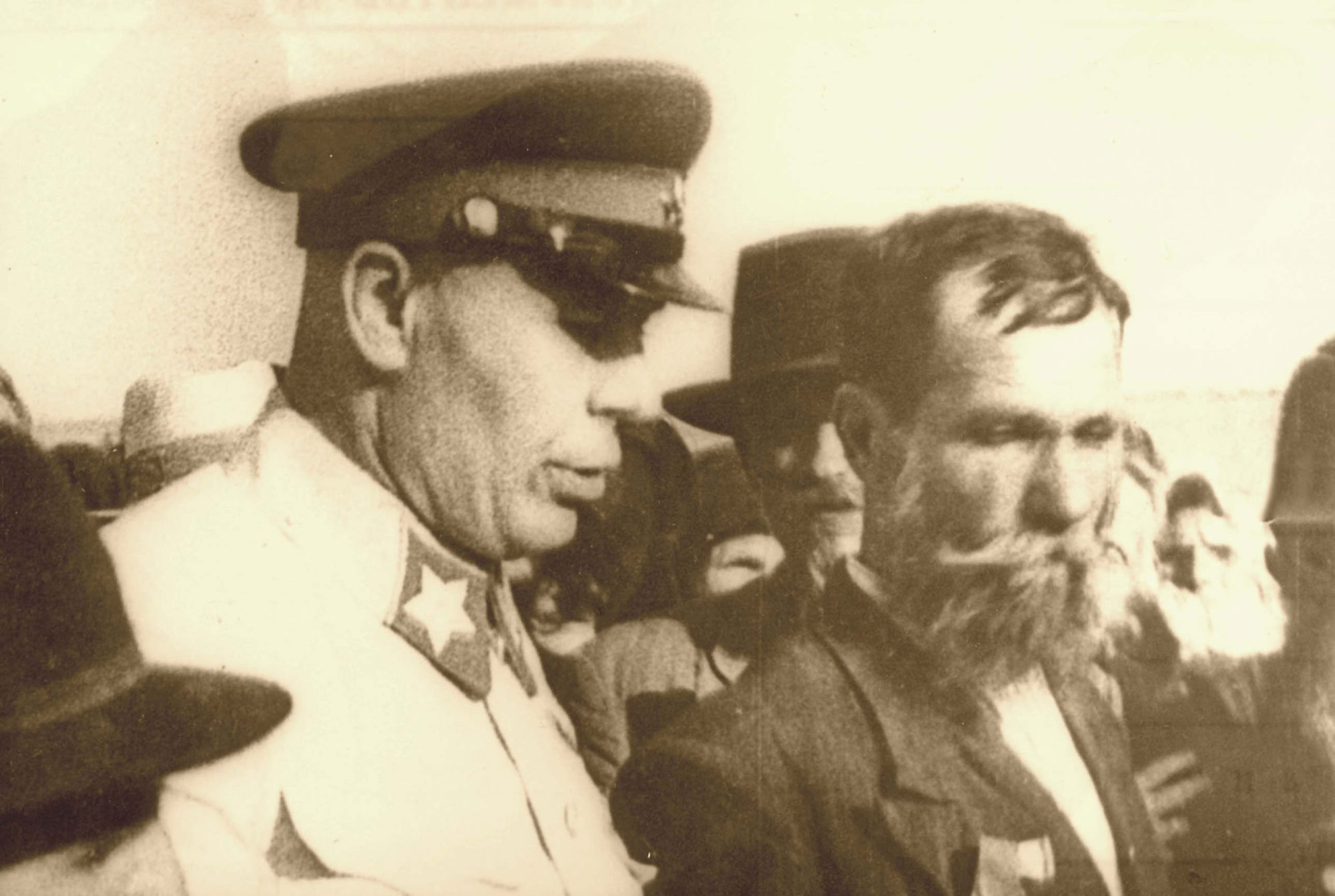
Soviet Marshal Semyon Timoshenko in Bessarabia

On 28 June at 9:00, Communique no. 25 of the General Staff of the Romanian Army officially announced the terms of the ultimatum to the population, its acceptance by the Romanian government, and the intent to evacuate the army and administration to the Prut River. By 14:00, three key cities (Chișinău, Cernăuți, and Cetatea Albă) had to be turned over to the Soviets. The military installations and casemates, built during a 20-year period for the event of a Soviet attack, were relinquished without a fight, the Romanian Army being placed by its command under strict orders not to respond to provocations. In a declaration to the local population, the Soviet command stated: "The great hour of your liberation from the yoke of Romanian boyars, landowners, capitalists and Siguranța has arrived".

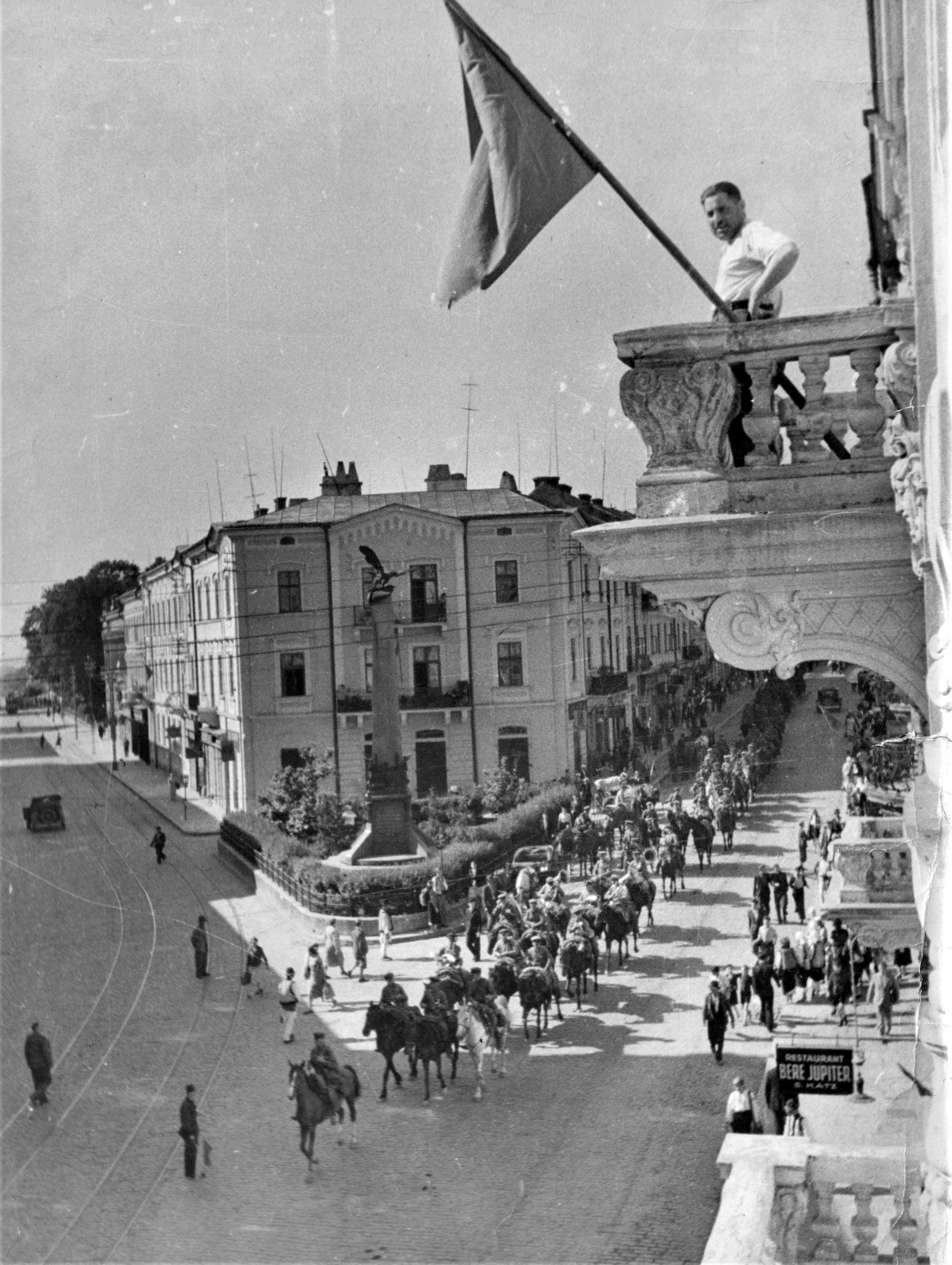
Soviet troops entering Cernăuți in 1940

Part of the population left the regions with the Romanian administration. According to the April 1941 Romanian census, the total number of refugees from the evacuated territories amounted to 68,953, but as the ultimatum came unexpectedly, many people did not have time to evacuate, and over 70,000 requests for repatriation to Romania were later recorded. On the other hand, by early August 1940, between 112,000 and 149,974 people had left the other territories of Romania for the Soviet-ruled Bessarabia. That figure comprised Romanians of the region but also included Jews, both from Bessarabia and from the Old Kingdom, who wanted to escape the officially endorsed antisemitism in Romania.

=== Incorporation of annexed territories into the Soviet Union ===
Romania in 1940 with Bessarabia and Northern Bukovina highlighted in orange-red

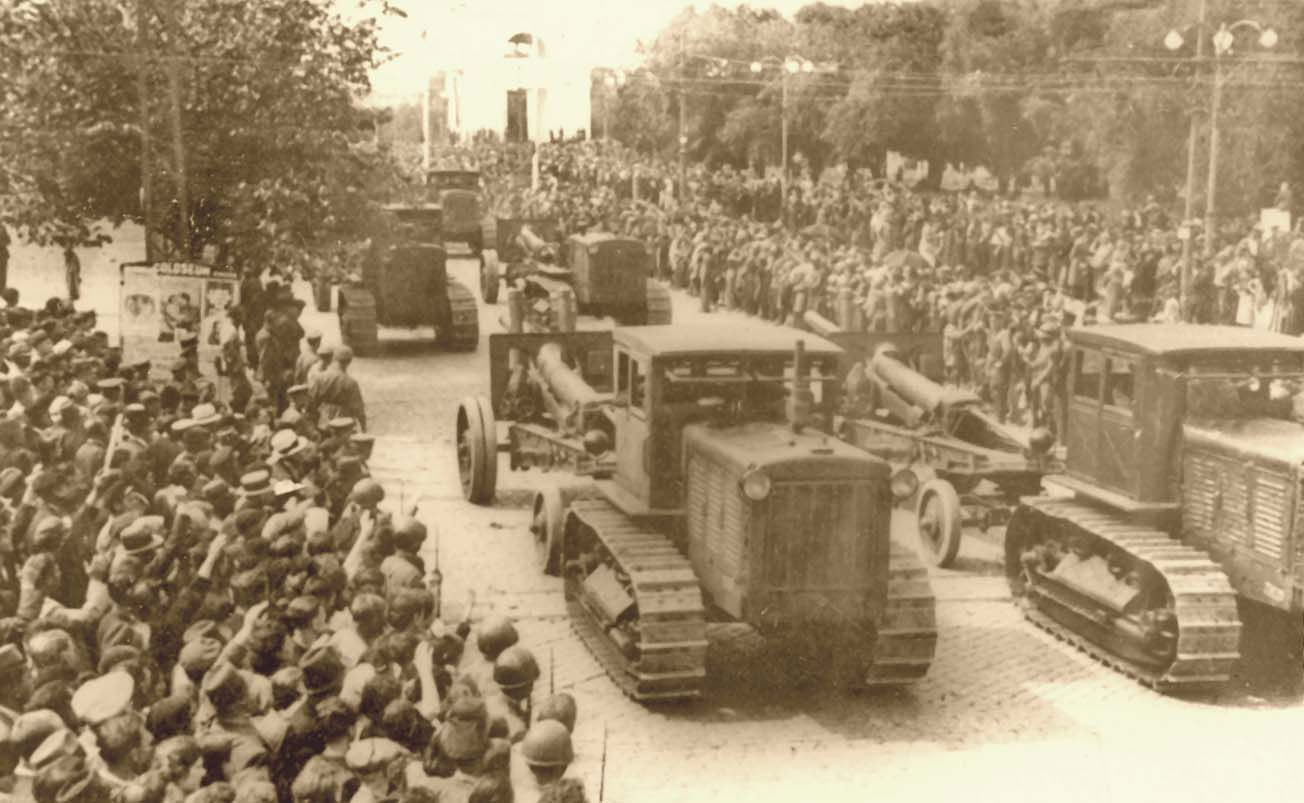
Soviet military parade in Chișinău on July 4, 1940

As Romania agreed to satisfy Soviet territorial demands, the second plan was immediately put into action, with the Red Army immediately moving into Bessarabia and north Bukovina on the morning of 28 June. By 30 June the Red Army reached the border along the Prut River. On 3 July the border was closed completely from the Soviet side.

One month after the military occupation, on 2 August 1940, the Moldavian Soviet Socialist Republic was established on the main part of the annexed territory, and smaller portions were given to the Ukrainian Soviet Socialist Republic. Six Bessarabian counties and small portions of the other three counties, along with parts of the Moldavian ASSR (formerly part of the Ukrainian SSR), which was disbanded on that occasion, formed the Moldavian SSR, which became one of 15 union republics of the Soviet Union. The Soviet governmental commission headed by Nikita Khrushchev, the Communist Party chief of Ukrainian SSR, allotted Northern Bukovina, Hertsa region and larger parts of Hotin (Northern Bessarabia), Ismail, and Cetatea Albă (Budjak) counties to the Ukrainian SSR.

In 1940 to 1941, political persecution of certain categories of locals took the form of arrests, executions and deportations to the eastern parts of the Soviet Union. According to Alexandru Usatiuc-Bulgăr, 32,433 people received a politically motivated sentence, of which 8,360 were sentenced to death or died during interrogations. The total number of people considered for deportation from Soviet Moldova to Siberia in June 1941 was 31,699, while 8,374 had been designed from the Chernivtsi oblast of Ukraine and 3,767 from the Izmail oblast of Ukraine (southern Bessarabia); the total was 43,840. According to Nikolai Bougai, only 22,643 individuals had been deported from Soviet Moldova by September 1941. The number of deportees to the Soviet north and east from the Hertsa raion in its boundaries from early 2020 of the Chernivtsi oblast on 13 June 1941, was 1,373; 219 of them would later die in Siberia and Kazakhstan. Among the 1,373 deportees from Hertsa Raion, 120 were of unknown nationality; among the 1,253 people whose nationality was known, 1090 (86.99%) were ethnic Romanians, 125 were ethnic Jews (9.98%), 31 were ethnic Ukrainians (2.474%), 4 were ethnic Russians (0.32%), 2 were ethnic Germans (0.02%) and 1 was ethnically Polish (0.08%). The number of inhabitants of the Chernivtsi Oblast who were deported to Siberia and Kazakhstan was 7,720 (2,279 families). According to some sources, most of the deportees of June 1941 from the Chernivtsi oblast, who were of many ethnicities, did not return from the Soviet east. However, the fragmentary, locality-by-locality, evidence indicates that most of the deportees from 1941 survived. Dr. Avigdor Schachan, who wrote a book about the Transnistrian ghettos in Transnistria under Romanian rule in 1941-1944, and was himself brought up in the Bessarabian part of the present-day Chernivtsi Oblast of Ukraine, estimates that about 2,000 northern Bukovinian and 4,000 Bessarabian Jews were deported to the Soviet east in June 1941. About half of the Jews deported from Bessarabia to the Soviet east survived and returned to Bessarabia, and the rest did not return, according to a source mentioned by Jean Ancel (Matathias Carp), the specialist on the Holocaust in Romania and Transnistria; however, Carp's estimate is not confirmed by other sources. In 1951, there were 1,136 kulaks from the Izmail Region in Western Siberia.

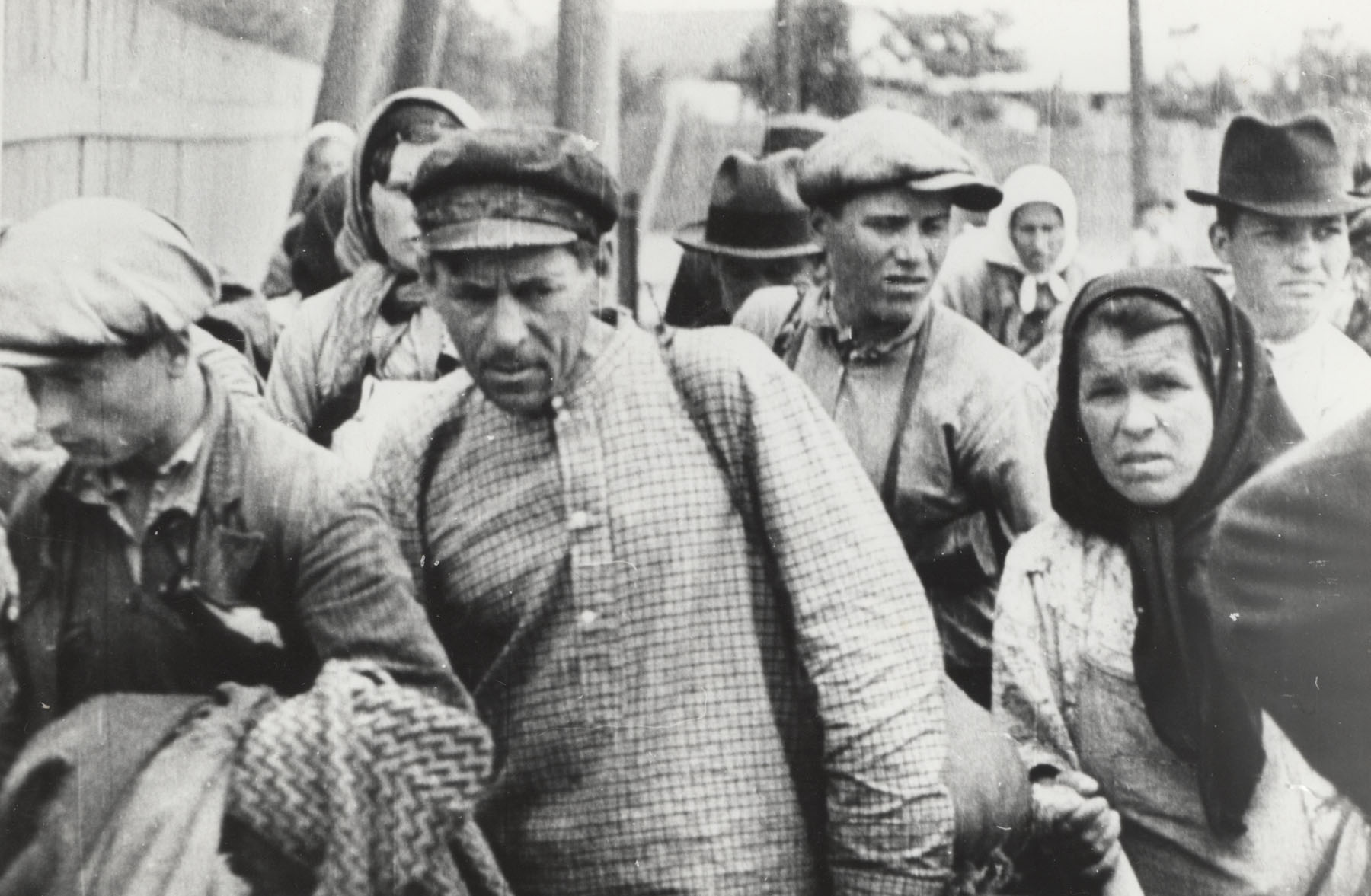
Refugees after the occupation

Serious incidents occurred in Northern Bukovina, where attempts by the locals to force the border towards Romania resulted in the Soviet border guards opening fire against unarmed civilians. In one case, at Fântâna Albă, that resulted in a massacre in which between 50 and 3,000 Romanians were killed. The situation was the same on the other side of the border: roughly 300 (or between 80 and 400, according to other sources) civilians, most of them Jews, waiting to leave for Soviet-controlled Bessarabia were shot by the Romanian army in Galați railway station on 30 June 1940.

The installation of the Soviet administration was also accompanied by major changes in the economic domain, as medium and large commercial and industrial enterprises were nationalized. The Soviet government also instituted a land reform that redistributed 229,752 hectares to 184,715 poor peasant households and limited estates to 20 hectares in the south and 10 hectares elsewhere. A collectivisation drive was also started in 1941, but the lack of agricultural machinery made the progress extremely slow, with 3.7% of the peasant households being included in a kolkhoz or a sovkhoz by the middle of year. To bolster the government's image, much of the 1941 budget was directed towards social and cultural needs, with 20% allocated to health services and 24% to education and literacy campaigns. The theological institute in Chișinău was closed, but six new higher education institutions were created, including a conservatory and a polytechnic. Furthermore, the salaries of industrial workers and administrative personnel were increased two to three times the pre-Soviet levels.

In September 1941, Romanian authorities uncovered evidence of torture perpetrated at the NKVD headquarters and in the basement of the Metropolitan Palace in Chișinău. Some 80 bodies were discovered, of which 15 in a common grave, with their hands and feet tied. The bodies had been mutilated and burned, then doused with quicklime and acids; from the remains of the clothing it was inferred that the victims were priests and students.

== Aftermath ==
=== International reactions ===
According to Time from Monday 1 July 1940,

This week Soviet planes began making reconnaissance flights over Bessarabia. Then border clashes were reported all along the Dn[i]estr River. Though the Rumanian Army made a show of resistance for the record, it has no chance of stopping the Soviet without help, and Germany had already acknowledged Soviet's claim to Bessarabia in secret deals last year. Romania had accepted her destiny in the new Europe that Hitler plans. She will also lose Transylvania to Hungary and probably a part of the Dobruja to Bulgaria. (...) Soviet's Sphere. Soviet was preoccupied with consolidating her own position to the east of Hitler's Europe. On the heels of her occupation of Estonia, Latvia and Lithuania, those three countries set up left-wing Governments that looked like steppingstones to complete sovietization. (...) Germany took the occupation calmly. Germany's calm was doubtless real, since last year's deals gave Soviet Union a free hand in the Baltic as well as Bessarabia.

=== Political developments in Romania ===
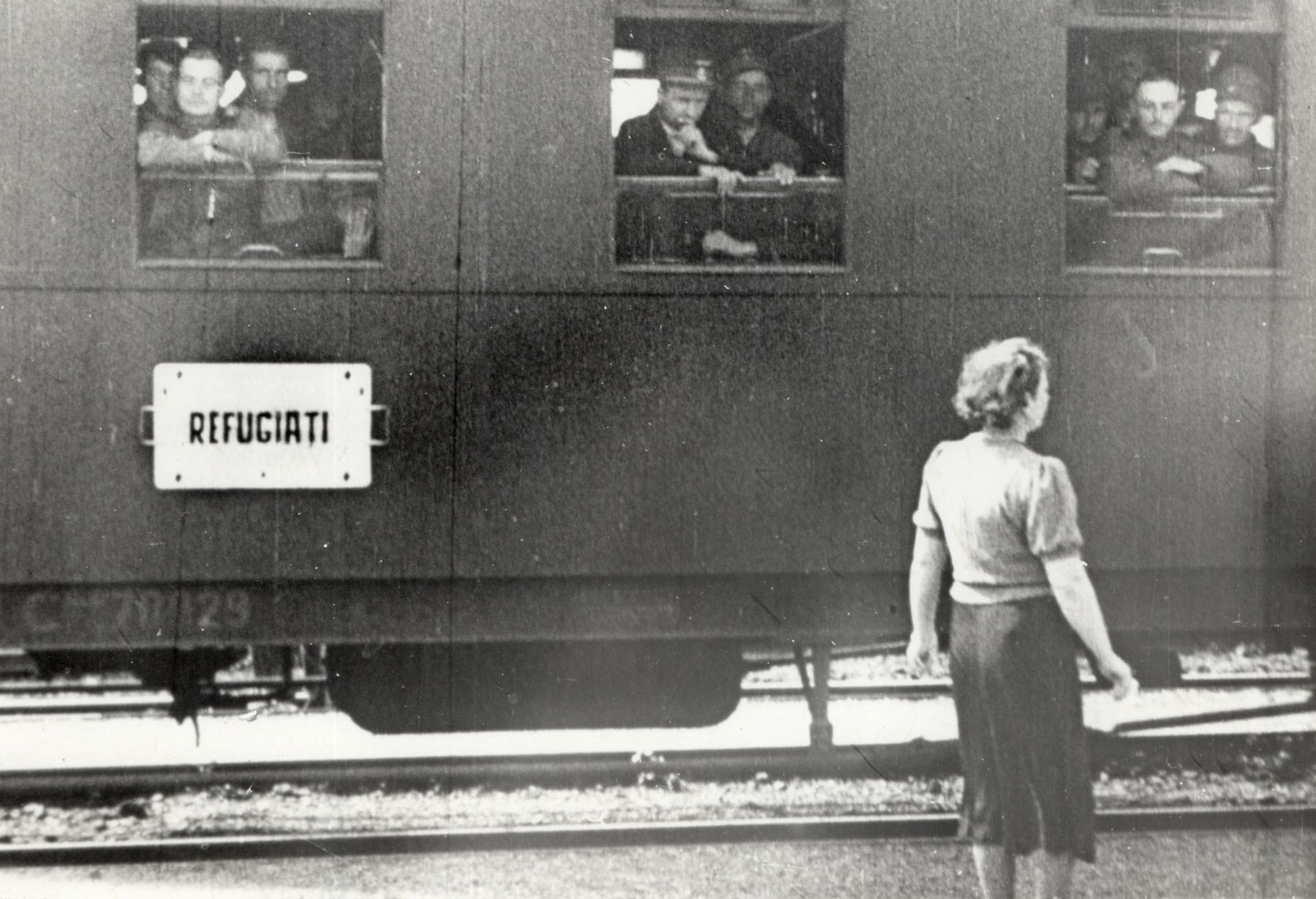
A train with refugees

The territorial concessions of 1940 produced deep sorrow and resentment among Romanians and hastened the decline in popularity of the regime led by King Carol II of Romania. Three days after the annexation, Romania renounced the 1939 Anglo-French guarantee. A new government of Ion Gigurtu was sworn in on 5 July 1940, which withdrew the country from the League of Nations on 11 July and announced its desire to join the Axis camp on 13 July. A series of measures taken by Gigurtu, including official persecution of Jews inspired by the German Nuremberg Laws in July and August 1940, failed to sway Germany from awarding Northern Transylvania to Hungary in the Second Vienna Award on 30 August 1940.

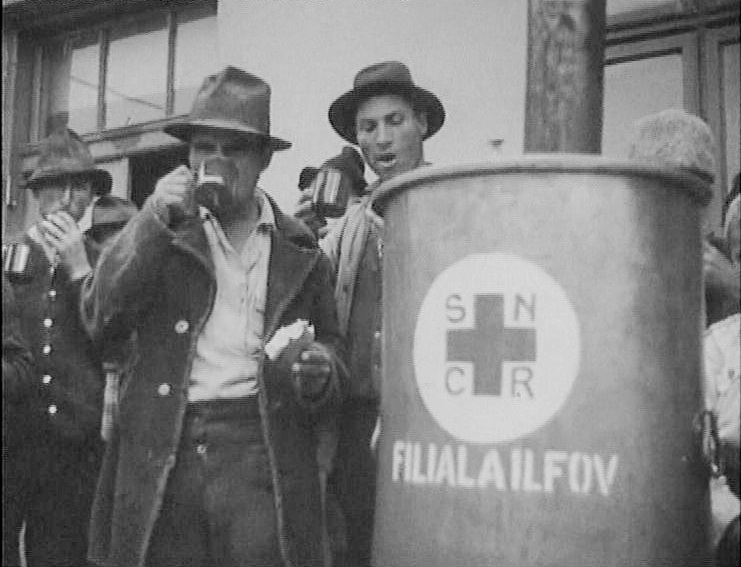
Red Cross helping refugees in Romania in a government newsreel

That led to a near-uprising in the country. On 5 September King Carol II proposed to General (later Marshal) Ion Antonescu to form a new government. Antonescu's first act was to force the King to abdicate, for the fourth and final time, and to flee Romania. An alliance was formed by Ion Antonescu with remnants of the Iron Guard (partly destroyed in 1938), an antisemitic fascist party, and took power on 6 September 1940. Mihai, the son of Carol II, succeeded him as King of Romania. The country was declared a National Legionary State. Between October 1940 and June 1941, around 550,000 German troops entered Romania. In November, Antonescu signed the Tripartite Pact, which tied Romania militarily to Germany, Italy and Japan. In January 1941, the Iron Guard attempted a coup, which failed and placed Antonescu firmly in power, with the approval of Hitler. The authoritarian regime of Antonescu (1940–1944) did not restore political parties and democracy but only co-opted several individual civilians in the government.

Overall, the desire to regain the lost territories was invoked as a justification by Romania for its entry into World War II on the side of the Axis against the Soviet Union.

=== Romanian reoccupation ===
On 22 June 1941, Romania, alongside the other Axis powers, commenced an invasion of the Soviet Union, with Romania's stated intent being the recovery of Bessarabia and Bukovina. The Axis forces completed the occupation of these territories by 26 July 1941.

King Michael I, alongside his mother Helen and Mihai Antonescu, participated in the opening ceremony for Liberation Tower in Ghidighici on 1 November 1942.

On 27 July 1941, Ion Antonescu, despite major political opposition, ordered the Romanian army to continue the war further eastward into Soviet territory, fighting at Odessa, Crimea, Kharkov, Stalingrad, and the Caucasus. Between late 1941 and early 1944, Romania occupied and administered the region between the Dniester and Southern Bug rivers, known as Transnistria, as well as sending expeditionary forces to support the German advance into the Soviet Union in several areas.

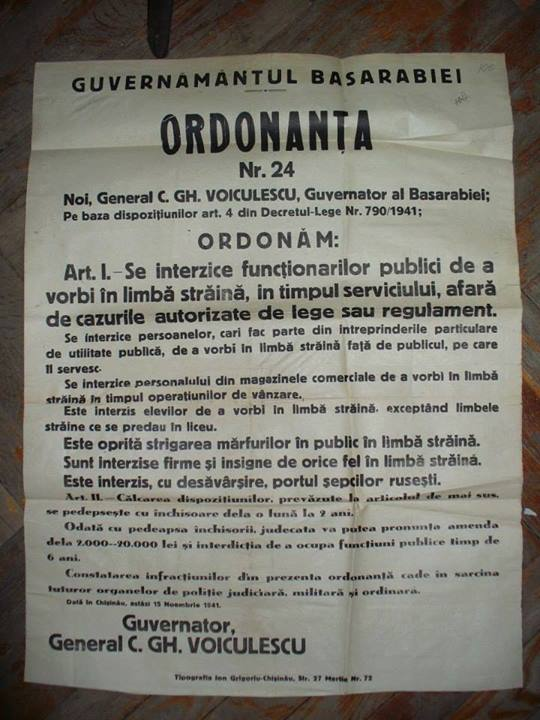
Military ordinance forbidding use of foreign languages and wearing of "Russian caps" in Bessarabia, 15 November 1941

In the context of increasing antisemitism within the country during the late 1930s, the Antonescu government officially adopted a narrative of Jewish Bolshevism, declaring Jews responsible for Romania's territorial losses during the summer of 1940. Thus, after the reconquest in July 1941, in a coordinated effort with Germany, the Romanian government embarked on a campaign to "cleanse" the recaptured territories, engaging in the mass deportation and murder of the remaining Jews in Bukovina and Bessarabia who hadn't fled further into the Soviet Union. In 1941 alone, between 45,000 and 60,000 Jews within these territories were killed by Romanian and German forces. The survivors were quickly rounded up into ghettos, and of these between 154,449 and 170,737 were deported to Transnistria—by 16 September 1943, only 49,927 were still alive. By 1944, only 19,475 Jews in Bukovina and Dorohoi County had avoided being deported, most of them in Cernăuți. Romanian gendarmerie units, alongside German troops and local militias, also carried out the destruction of the Jewish community in Transnistria, murdering between 115,000 and 180,000 people.

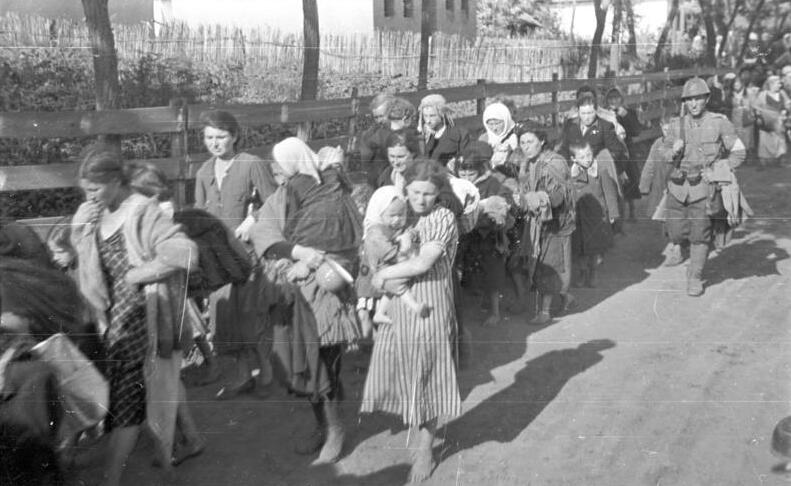
Jews being deported to concentration camps by the Romanian Army

During the war, many young inhabitants of Bessarabia and northern Bukovina were recruited into the Romanian army. From February until August 1944, Romania struggled to defend itself in the face of Soviet counteroffensives, with the Antonescu regime ultimately being liquidated upon the country's total occupation by the Red Army in late 1944. Overall, the Romanian army suffered 475,070 casualties on the Eastern Front during World War II, with 245,388 either killed in action, missing, or otherwise dying in hospitals or in non-battle circumstances. According to Soviet archival documents, 229,682 Romanian prisoners of war were taken by the Red Army; the NKVD later counted 187,367 within their POW camps. As of 22 April 1956, 54,612 of these were counted as having died in captivity, with 132,755 counted as freshly released; the front levels of the Soviet Army counted 27,800 Romanians and 14,515 Moldovans as released.

=== Restoration of Soviet administration ===
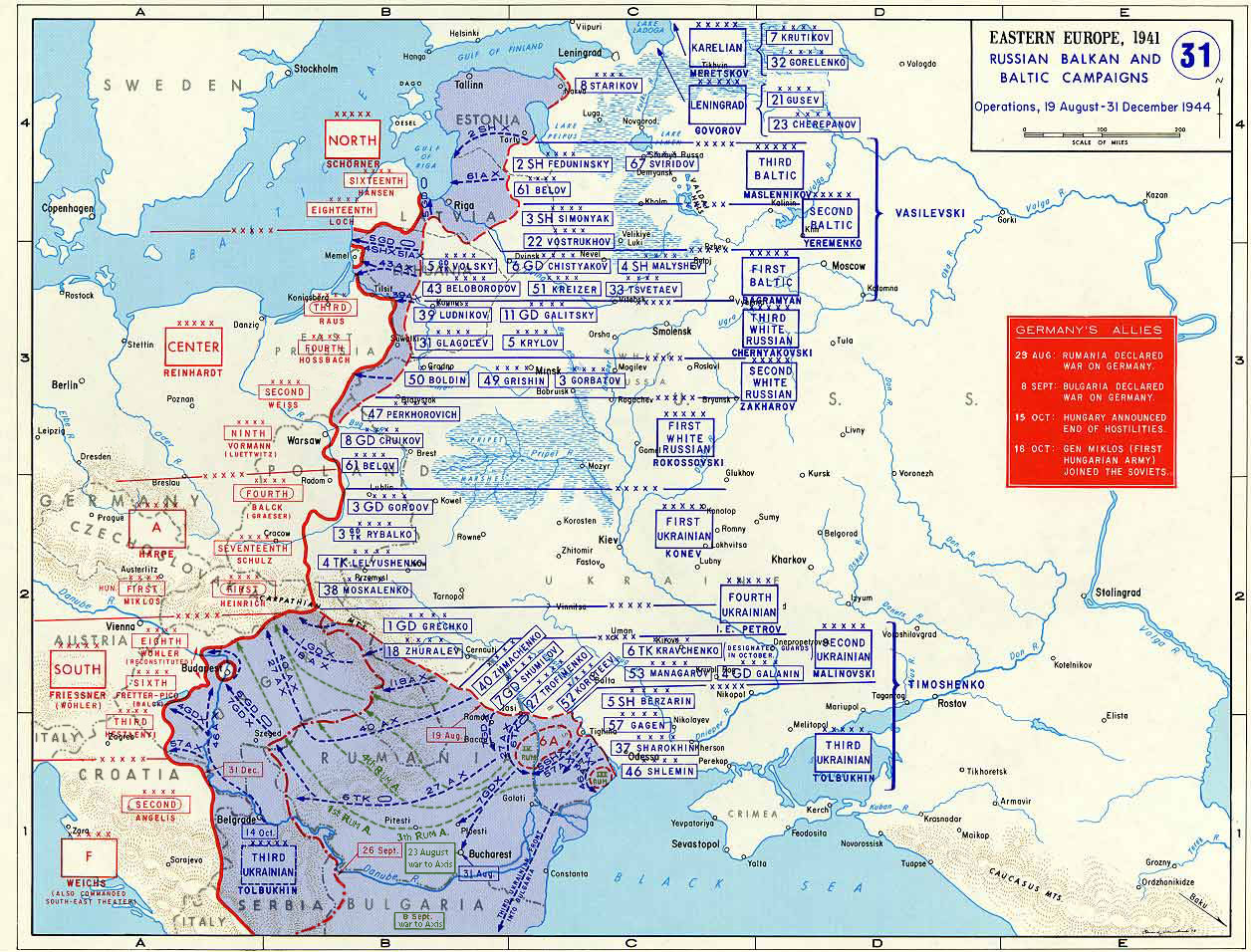
Soviet Operations 19 August to 31 December 1944

In early 1944, the Soviet Union gradually took over the territory through the Uman–Botoșani and Second Jassy–Kishinev offensives. On 23 August 1944, with Soviet troops advancing and the Eastern Front falling within Romania's territory, a coup led by King Michael, with support from opposition politicians and the army, deposed the Antonescu dictatorship, ceased military actions against the Allies and later put Romania's battered armies on their side. In the days immediately after the coup, as Romania's action was unilateral and no armistice had been agreed with the Allied Powers, the Red Army continued to treat the Romanian troops as enemy combatants, and in the confusion, the Romanian troops did not oppose them. As a consequence, the Soviets took a large number of Romanian troops as prisoners of war with little or no fighting. Some of the prisoners were Bessarabian-born. Michael acquiesced to Soviet terms, and Romania was occupied by the Soviet Army.

From August 1944 to May 1945, about 300,000 people were conscripted into the Soviet Army from Bessarabia and Northern Bukovina and were sent to fight against Germany in Lithuania, East Prussia, Poland and Czechoslovakia.

In 1947, as part of the Paris Peace Treaties, Romania and the Soviet Union signed a border treaty confirming the border fixed in 1940. Several additional uninhabited islands in the Danube Delta as well as the Snake Island, not mentioned in the treaty, were transferred from communist Romania to the Soviet Union in 1948.

== Social and cultural consequences ==
Ethnic map of Interwar Romania based on the 1930 census

At the moment of the Soviet occupation, the regions had a total population of 3,776,309 inhabitants. According to Romanian official statistics, this was distributed among the ethnic groups as follows: Romanians (53.49%), Ukrainians and Ruthenians (15.3%), Russians (10.34%), Jews (7.27%), Bulgarians (4.91%), Germans (3.31%), others (5.12%).

=== Population movements ===
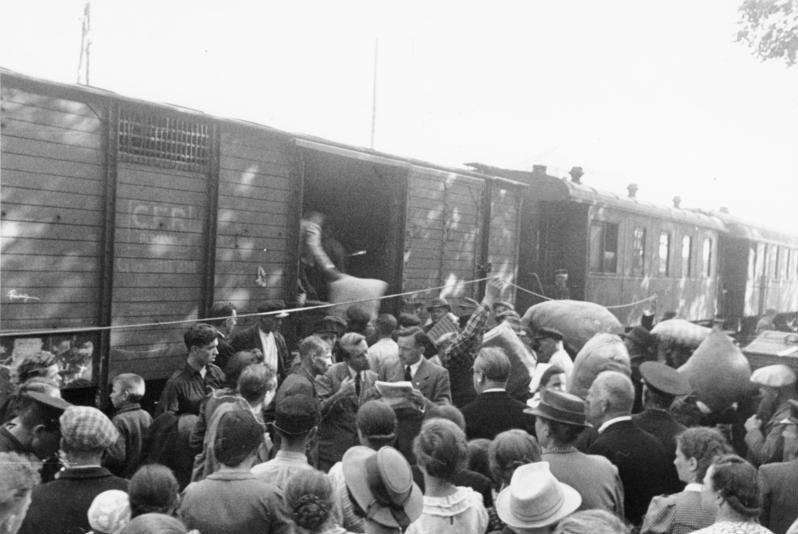
Volksdeutsche resettling after the Soviet occupation of Bessarabia

During the Soviet takeover in 1940, Bessarabian Germans (82,000) and Bukovinian Germans (40,000–45,000) were repatriated to Germany at the request of Hitler's government. Some of them were forcibly settled by the Nazis in the German-occupied Poland and had to move again in 1944–1945. The people affected by the resettlement were not persecuted, but they were given no choice to stay or live and had to change their entire livelihood within weeks or even days.

=== Deportations and political repression ===
Deportations of locals on grounds of belonging to the intelligentsia or kulak classes, or of having anti-Soviet nationalist ideas occurred in 1940 to 1941 and 1944 to 1951. The deportations touched all local ethnic groups: Romanians, Ukrainians, Russians, Jews, Bulgarians, Gagauz. Significant deportations happened on three separate occasions: according to Alexandru Usatiuc-Bulgăr, 29,839 people were deported to Siberia on 13 June 1941. In total, in the first year of Soviet occupation, no fewer than 86,604 people from Bessarabia, Northern Bukovina, and Hertsa Region suffered political repression. That number is close to the one calculated by Russian historians following documents in the Moscow archives, of ca. 90,000 people repressed (arrested, executed, deported or conscripted for work) in the first year of Soviet occupation. The greater part of the figure (53,356) was represented by forced conscription for labour across the Soviet Union. The classification of such labourers as victims of political repression is, however, disputed since the poverty of the locals and Soviet propaganda are also considered important factors leading to the emigration of the local workforce. The arrests continued even after 22 June 1941.

Based on postwar statistics, the historian Igor Cașu has shown that Moldovans and Romanians comprised roughly 50 percent of the deportees, with the rest being Jews, Russians, Ukrainians, Gagauzes, Bulgarians and Roma people. Considering the ethnic make-up of the region, he concludes that the prewar and postwar repressions were not directed at any specific ethnic or national group but could be characterised as "genocide" or "crime against humanity". The 1941 deportation targeted "anti-Soviet elements" and comprised former representatives of the Romanian interwar administration (policemen, gendarmes, prison guards, clerks), large landowners, tradesmen, former officers of the Romanian, Polish and Tsarist armies and people who had defected the Soviet Union before 1940. Kulaks did not become main targets of repression until the postwar period. Before Soviet archives were made accessible, R. J. Rummel had estimated between 1940 and 1941, 200,000 to 300,000 Romanian Bessarabians were deported, of whom 18,000 to 68,000 were killed according to him.

According to Nikolai Bougai, "In March, 1945, the relocation of other nations was undertaken in the Republic of Moldavia, including Romanians, Jews and Gypsies." He noted that 13,087 Romanian citizens living Soviet Moldova, and 3,967 Romanian citizens from Soviet Ukraine (17,054 overall), were targeted for relocation, as were 12,852 Jews from 5,420 families with both Romanian and Soviet citizenship living in Ukraine. With the return of the Soviet rule over Transnistria, many male Jews present in the region were drafted and, after some training, were either sent to the front or to the coal mines in the Arkhangelsk basin; these were allowed to return to Romania in 1947. About 400 workers from the "Turnatoria" factory in Mohylyv-Podilskyi, and ten from another factory, especially "bourgeois capitalists", were drafted into the Soviet army or sent to forced labor. A number of "Gypsies" (though the number is not indicated) were relocated from Bessarabia "to Nizhni Tagil of the Palodar region and to the Akmolinsk region."

On 11 October 1942, the (Soviet) State Committee on Defense decided to extend the decrees on "the mobilization of the NKVD labour columns, German men, able to work, 17–50 years old—to the persons of other nations, being in war with USSR-Romanians, Hungarians, Italians, Finns."; the order was signed by Stalin. As a result, in May 1944, in the village of Molodiia and some other northern Bukovinian localities, those men who declared a "Moldovan" nationality were incorporated into the Soviet army, while those who declared a "Romanian" nationality were sent to the work camps in the area of Lake Onega, where most of them died. The Soviet era dominance of the "Moldovan" identity in parts of northern Bukovina was due to the fact that the inhabitants of the Chernivtsi and Sadagura rural raions, and of the Bukovinian part of the Novoselytsia Raion in the Chernivtsi Oblast, were pressured in 1944 to adopt a "Moldovan" national/ethnic identity.

Ultimately, 11,239 families, comprising 35,050 people, were detained and deported on 6 July 1949, with the rest either escaping or being exempt due to their contribution to the Soviet war effort or their support for collectivisation. In an interpellation in the Parliament of Romania in 2009, international judge and politician Tudor Panțîru put the number of deportees from 6–7 July at 40,000.

In total, from the Moldavian SSR, there were 723 families (2,617 people) deported on the night of 31 March to 1 April 1951, all members of Neo-Protestant religions, mostly Jehovah's Witnesses, and qualified as religious elements considered a potential danger for the Communist regime. In the previously mentioned interpellation, Panțîru claimed some 6,000 ethnic Romanians from the Moldavian SSR were deported to Central Asia on 1 April 1951.

=== Religious persecution ===
After the installation of the Soviet administration, religious life in Bessarabia and Northern Bukovina underwent a persecution similar to the one in Russia between the World Wars. In the first days of occupation, certain population groups welcomed the Soviet power, and some of them joined the newly established Soviet nomenklatura, including the NKVD, the Soviet political police. The latter had used those locals to find and arrest numerous priests. Other priests were arrested and interrogated by the Soviet NKVD itself, deported to the interior of the Soviet Union and killed. Research on the subject is still at an early stage. As of 2007, the Orthodox Church has recognized the martyrdom to about 50 clergymen, who died in the first year of Soviet rule (1940–1941).

== Legacy ==
=== In the Soviet Union ===
In early Soviet historiography, the chain of events that led to the creation of the Moldavian SSR was described as a "liberation of the Moldovan people from a 22-year-old occupation by boyar Romania." The Soviet authors went into great length to describe scenes how the liberated Bessarabian people eagerly welcomed Soviet troops ending the "22 years of yoke under the Romanian capitalists and landowners", organized demonstrations under red flags and liberated imprisoned communists from the Siguranța torture chambers. From 1940 to 1989, the Soviet authorities promoted the events of 28 June 1940 as a "liberation", and the day itself was a holiday in the Moldavian Soviet Socialist Republic.

However, in 2010, the Russian political analyst Leonid Mlechin stated that the term occupation was not adequate but that "it is more an annexation of a part of the territory of Romania".

=== Pre-independence Moldova ===
From 26 to 28 June 1991, an International Conference "Molotov–Ribbentrop Pact and its consequences for Bessarabia" took place in Chișinău, gathering scholars such as Nicholas Dima, Kurt Treptow, Dennis Deletant, Michael Mikelson, Stephen Bowers, Lowry Wymann, Michael Bruchis, in addition to other Moldovan, Soviet and Romanian authors. An informal Declaration of Chișinău was adopted, according to which the Pact and its Secret Protocol "constituted the apogee of collaboration between the Soviet Union and Nazi Germany, and following these agreements, Bessarabia and Northern Bukovina were occupied by the Soviet Army on 28 June 1940 as a result of ultimative notes addressed to the Romanian government". It further stated that the events were a "pregnant manifestation of imperialist policy of annexation and diktat, a shameless aggression against the sovereignty [...] of neighboring states, members of the League of Nations. The Stalinist aggression constituted a serious breach of the legal norms of behavior of states in international relations, of the obligations assumed under the Briand-Kellog Pact of 1928, and under the London Convention on the Definition of the Aggressor of 1933". The declaration stated that "the Pact and the Secret Additional Protocol are legally null ab initio, and their consequences must be eliminated". For the latter, it called for "political solutions that would lead to the elimination of the acts of injustice and abuse committed through the use of force, diktat and annexations,... [solutions] in full consensus with the principles of the Final Act of Helsinki, and the Paris Charter for a new Europe".

=== United States ===
On 28 June 1991, the US Senate voted a resolution sponsored by Senators Jesse Helms (R-NC) and Larry Pressler (R-SD), members of the US Senate Committee on Foreign Relations, which recommended the US government to

1. support the right to self-determination of the people of Moldova and Northern Bukovina, occupied by the Soviets, and to draft a decision to this end;
2. support the future efforts of the Government of Moldova to negotiate, if it desires so, a peaceful reunification of Moldova and Northern Bukovina with Romania, as established in the Treaty of Paris (1920), respecting the existing norms of international law and principle 1 of the Helsinki Act.

In the clauses of this Senate resolution it has been stated, among other things, that "[...] The armed forces of the Soviet Union invaded the Kingdom of Romania and occupied Eastern Moldova, Northern Bukovina and Hertsa Region. [...] The annexation was prepared beforehand in a Secret Agreement to a Non-Aggression Treaty signed by the Governments of the Soviet Union and the German Reich on 23 August 1939. [...] Between 1940 and 1953 hundreds of thousand of Romanian from Moldova and Northern Bukovina were deported by the USSR to Central Asia and Siberia [...]."

=== Modern Moldova ===
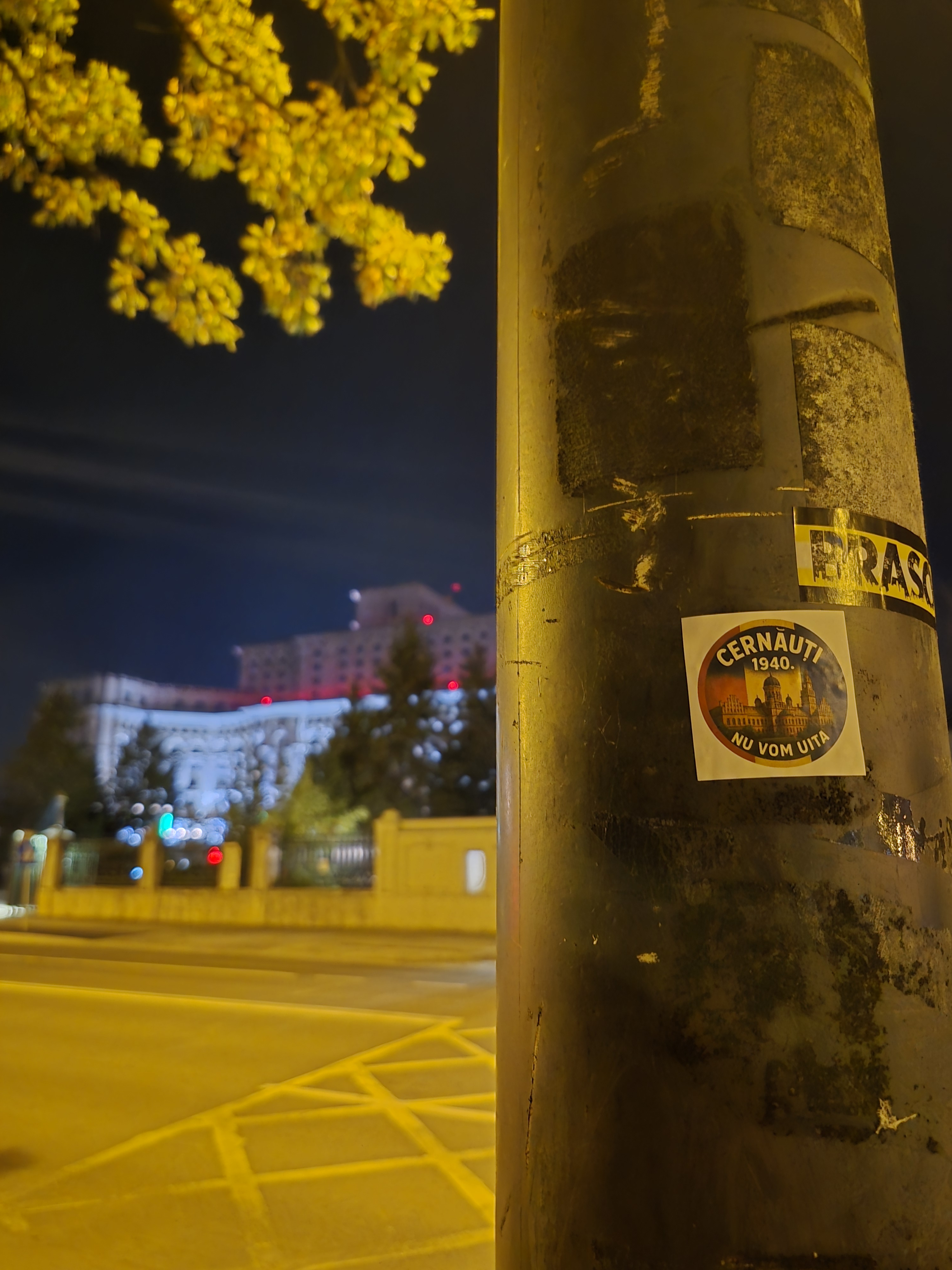
Sticker in Bucharest, near the Palace of the Parliament, with the following text: "Chernivtsi. 1940. We will not forget", as a reference to the 1940 Soviet occupation and annexation of the city

- Mihai Ghimpu, interim president of Moldova in 2010, decreed 28 June 1940, as Soviet Occupation Day. The move was met with disapproval and calls for the decree's revocation inside the ruling coalition and for Ghimpu's resignation by the opposition parties. Dorin Chirtoacă, then mayor of Chișinău and member of the same party as Ghimpu, ordered the erection of a memorial stone in the National Assembly Square, in front of the cabinet building, where a Lenin monument used to stand. The members of the coalitions argued that the time has not come for such a decree and that it would only help the communists win more votes. The Academy of Sciences of Moldova declared that "in the view of recent disagreements regarding 28 June 1940 [...] we must take action and inform the public opinion about the academic community views". The academy declared: "Archival documents and historical research of international experts shows that the annexation of Bessarabia and Northern Bukovina was designed and built by Soviet Command as a military occupation of these territories. Ordinance of Interim President Michael Ghimpu reflects, in principle, the historical truth." The Constitutional Court cancelled Ghimpu's decree on 12 July 2010.
- On 30 June 2010, First Vlad Filat Cabinet decided to create the Museum of Victims of Communism and Vlad Filat opened the museum on 6 July 2010.
- The Party of Communists of the Republic of Moldova, as well as the Party of Socialists of the Republic of Moldova still regard the date of 28 June 1940 as the day of the Moldovan liberation from the Romanian occupation.

== See also ==
- European Day of Remembrance for Victims of Stalinism and Nazism
- Declaration on Crimes of Communism
- Prague Declaration on European Conscience and Communism
- Vilnius Declaration
- Comparison of Nazism and Stalinism
- Soviet occupation of Romania
