= Bessarabian Soviet Socialist Republic =

Former Soviet republic

Bessarabian Soviet Socialist Republic Romanian: Republica Sovietică Socialistă Basarabeană, RSS Basarabeană Russian: Бессарабская Советская Социалистическая Республика, Бессарабская ССР
- 1919
- Flag
- Status: Revolutionary committee of the Russian Soviet Federative Socialist Republic
- Demonym: Bessarabian
- Government: Provisional revolutionary Committee
Preceded by	Succeeded by
Kingdom of Romania	Kingdom of Romania
- Today part of: Moldova; Ukraine

The Bessarabian Soviet Socialist Republic or Bessarabian SSR (Romanian: Republica Sovietică Socialistă Basarabeană, RSS Basarabeană; Russian: Бессарабская Советская Социалистическая Республика, romanized: Bessarabskaya Sovetskaya Sotsialisticheskaya Respublika, Бессарабская ССР, Bessarabskaya SSR) was a revolutionary committee created under the patronage of Soviet Russia to establish a Soviet republic within Bessarabia. The only Bessarabian territory under the committee's control was the town of Bender during the uprising of 27−28 May 1919. While the government was disbanded later in 1919, the idea was revived during the Tatarbunary Uprising, when another committee held control over some villages in southern Bessarabia for a few days in September 1924.

== History ==
The Bessarabian SSR was proclaimed on 5 May 1919 in Odessa at the 2nd Regional Bolshevik Conference as a "Provisional Workers' and Peasants' Government in exile" and established on 11 May 1919 in Tiraspol as an autonomous part of Russian SFSR. Neither Odessa nor Tiraspol were part of historical Bessarabia. The self-proclaimed government of the Bessarabian SSR never managed to control any part of Bessarabia, which on 9 April 1918 united with Romania. Soviet authorities did not recognize the Union of Bessarabia with Romania, and the proclamation of the Bessarabian SSR was a political measure aimed at preparing a future invasion of Bessarabia by the Red Army.

The de facto-government had talks with the French military authorities over the military and political settlement but was disbanded in September 1919 after Denikin's army took control of the Odessa region.

The Western European powers recognised the union of Bessarabia and Romania by the Treaty of Paris (1920). However, the United States refused to sign the Treaty on the grounds that Russia was not represented at the conference. This aided the Soviet Union in its continued desire to retake Bessarabia, which it succeeded in doing twenty years later.

== Government (Provisional Sovnarkom) ==
- Chairman – Ivan Krivorukov
- People's Commissar of Interior – Alexander Krusser
- People's Commissar of Land Cultivation – Boris Gumpert
- People's Commissar of War – Boris Gumpert
- People's Commissar of Foreign Affairs – Daniil Ridel/Mihail Gh. Bujor
- People's Commissar of Food – Grigoriy Staryi
- People's Commissar of Enlightenment – G. Kasperovskiy
- People's Commissar of Road Communications – M. Palamarenko
- People's Commissar of Labour – V. Vorontsov
- People's Commissar of Finance – Zelman Ushan
- People's Commissar of Justice – Aleksandr Aladzhalov
- Administration of Affairs – I. Vizgerd
- Representative to the Soviet Ukraine – Asen Khristev

== See also ==
- Provisional Polish Revolutionary Committee
- Bessarabian question
- Moldavian Autonomous Soviet Socialist Republic
