= Icușeni =

Icușeni may refer to several villages in Romania:

- Icușeni, a village in Vorona Commune, Botoșani County
- Icușeni, a village in Victoria Commune, Iași County
