= Pisanie =

A pisanie is an architectural element, that consists of an inscription carved in stone, wood, metal, painted, etc., on the top of tombs or above the main door at the entrance in a church, in which are recorded information about the church, the donor, the founder, the builder, the data when the church was built, etc. The inscription usually includes a religious invocation, the name of the founder or founders, the date of construction, the motivation of the building, the circumstances of the time and other data.

The term comes from the Church Slavonic language and many churches and monasteries have the inscription written using the Cyrillic script.

== Gallery ==
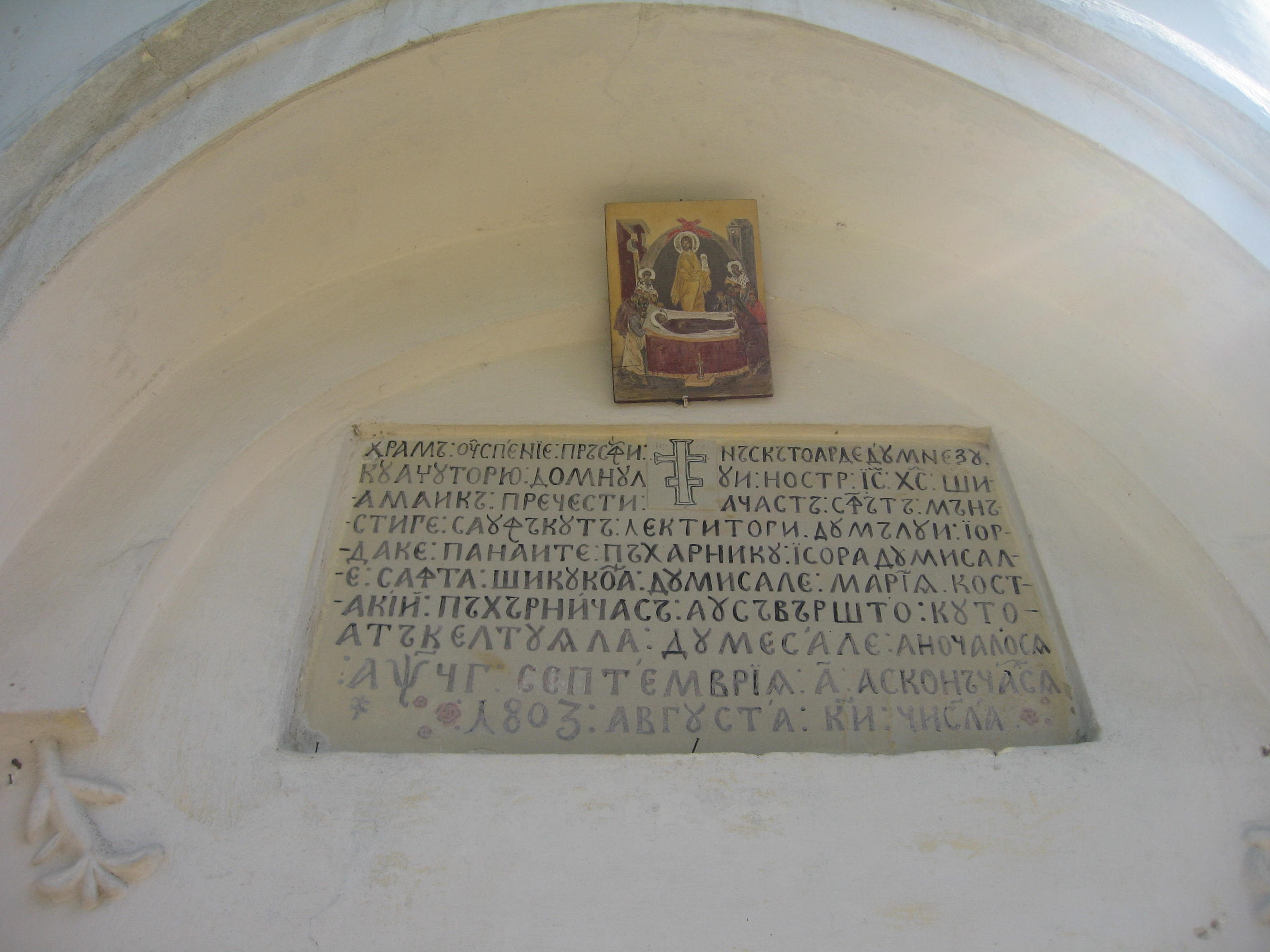
Stone carved pisanie of the Vorona Monastery (Vorona, Botoșani County, Romania)

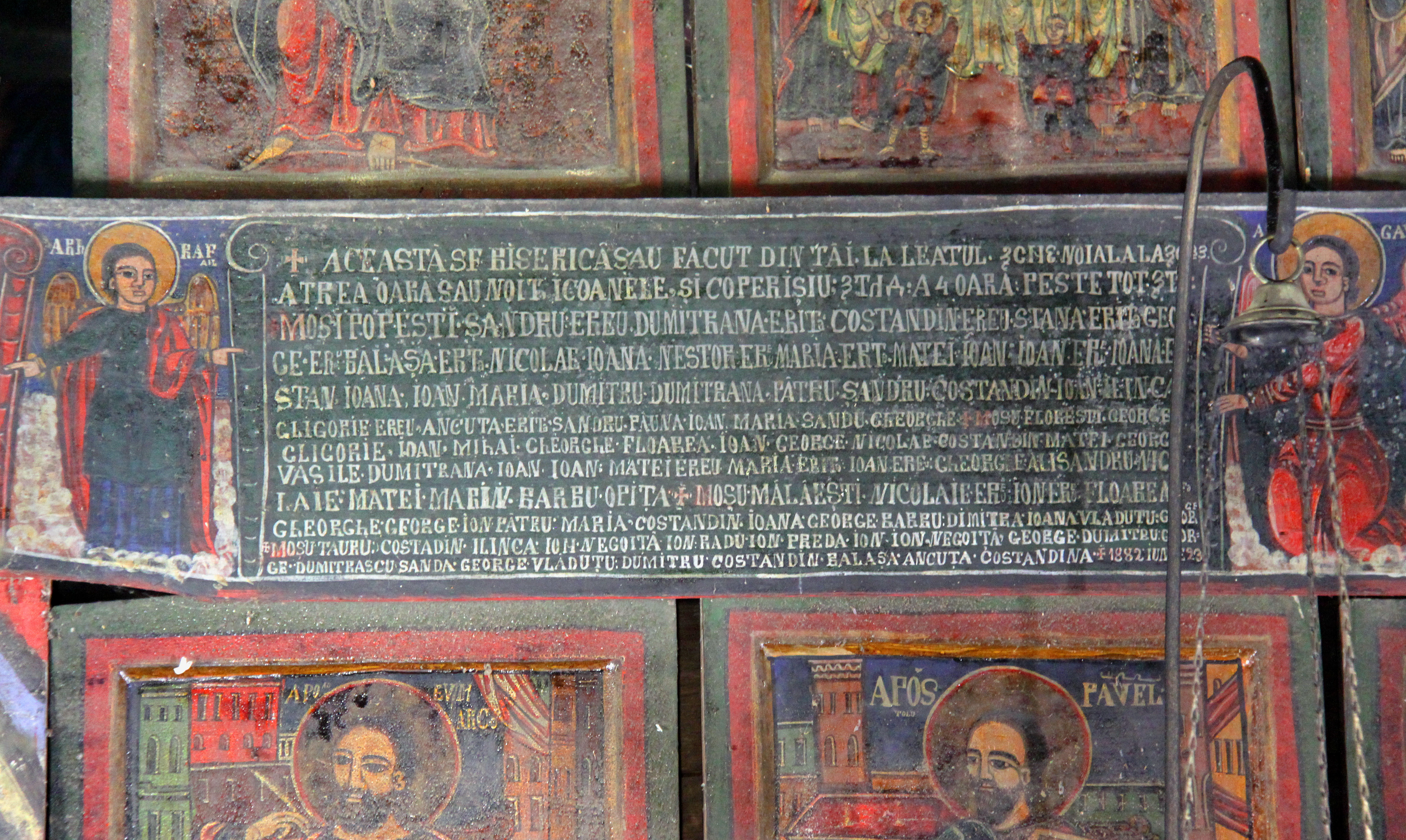
The painted pisanie of Wooden Floreșteni Church (Gorj County, Romania)

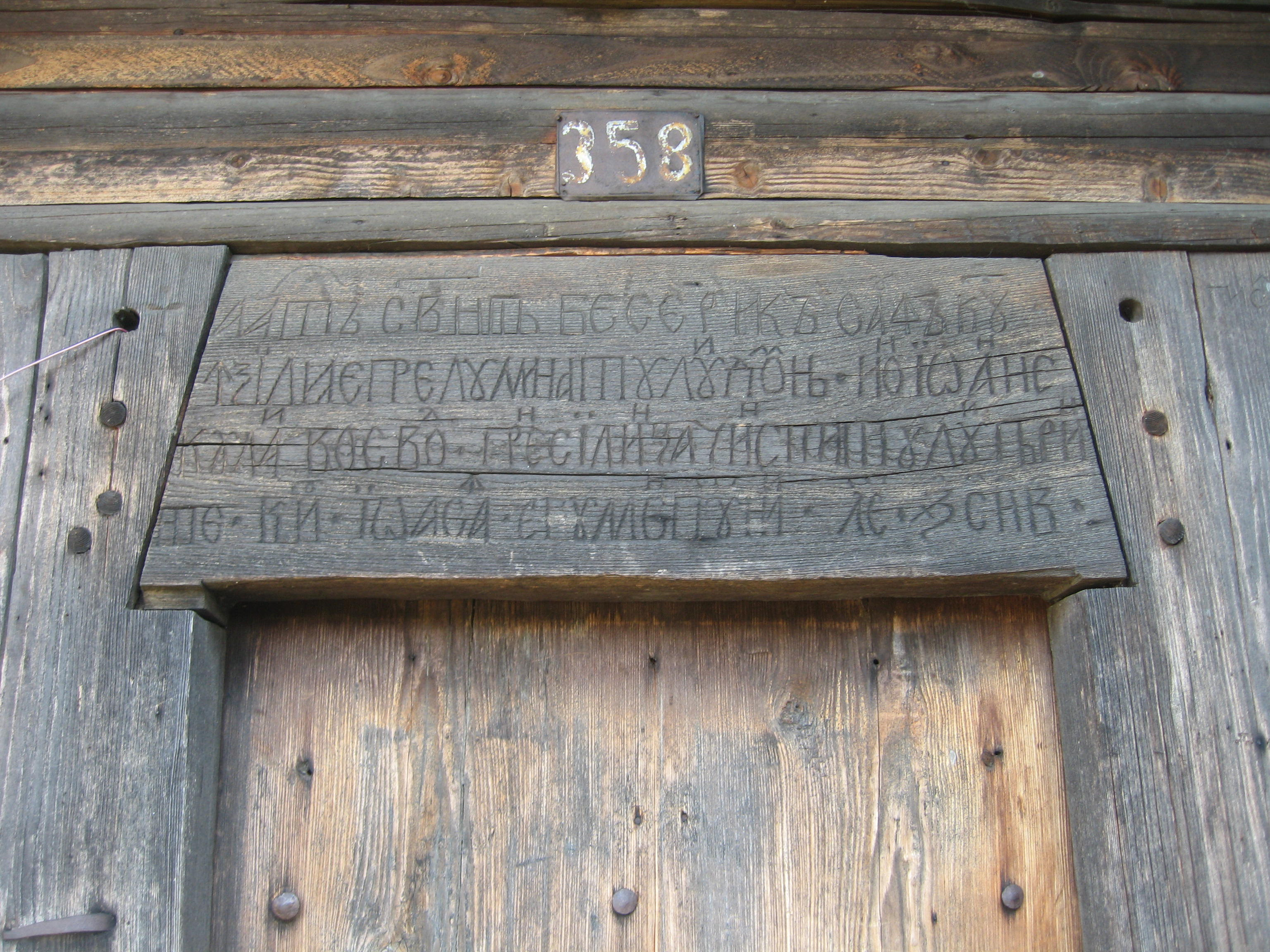
Wooden carved pisanie of the Wooden Bilca Church (Bilca, Suceava County, Romania), dated in the year 7252 of the Byzantine calendar

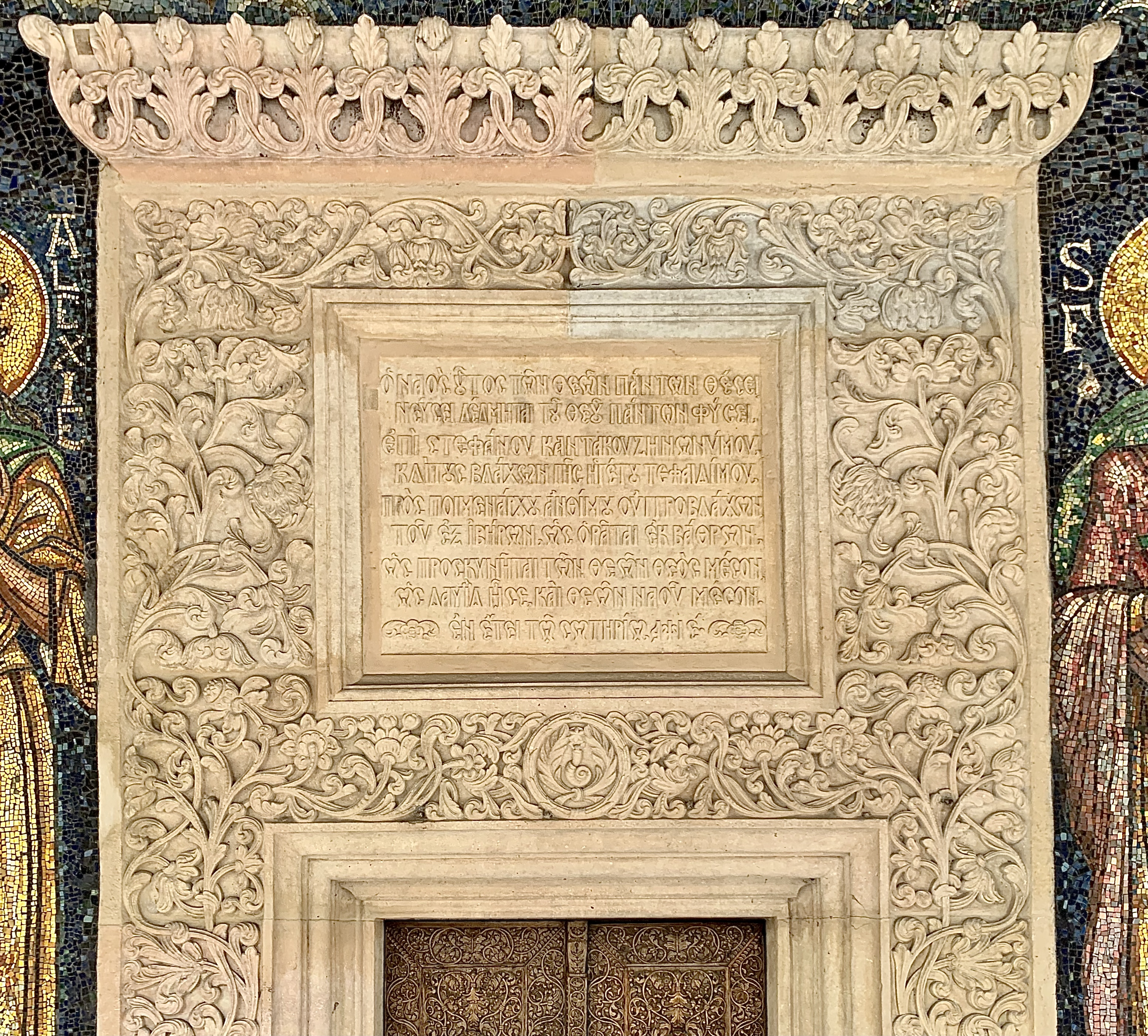
The pisanie of the Antim Monastery Church, in Bucharest (Romania)
