= Liberation Tower =

Liberation Tower may refer to:

- Liberation Tower, Bessarabia
- Liberation Tower, Kuwait
- Liberation Tower, Dhaka
