= Tocileni =

Tocileni may refer to:

- Tocileni, a village in Stăuceni Commune, Botoşani County
- Tocileni, a village in Pârscov Commune, Buzău County
