= Bender Uprising =

1919 uprising in the Kingdom of Romania

- Part of the Southern Front of the Russian Civil War
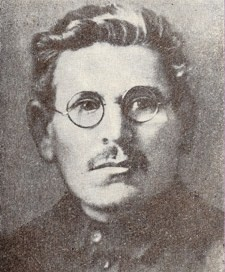
- Grigoriy Ivanovich Borisov (Stary), the leader of the Bender Uprising
| Date | 27 May 1919 |
| Location | Tighina, Kingdom of Romania (present day Bender, Moldova) |
| Result | Romanian–French victory |

Belligerents
| Romania; France | Red Guards; Ukrainian SSR |

Commanders and leaders
| Ferdinand I Henri Berthelot | Grigoriy Borisov |

Strength
| Unknown | 150+ Red Guards; 150 Ukrainian troops |

Casualties and losses
| Unknown | 150+ captured and executed |

The Bender Uprising was organized by local Bolshevik groups in Bender/Tighina on 27 May 1919, as a protest of the local Russian population against the annexation of Bessarabia by the Kingdom of Romania in December 1918 (united in a federation with Romania since April 1918, Bessarabia was annexed by the latter on 10 December). Red Guards from local factories were organized under the command of Grigoriy Borisov, and were supported by 150 troops of the 3rd Brigade of the 5th Division of the 3rd Ukrainian Soviet Army. Together, the Ukrainian troops and the rebels captured the local railway station, post office and telegraph office. During that evening, however, the Romanian Army together with a unit of French colonial troops arrived at the scene and swiftly suppressed the uprising. Although many rebels fled across the Dniester River, at least 150 of them were captured and executed.

== See also ==
- Bessarabian question
