= Teoctist Arăpașu =

Patriarch of Romania from 1986 to 2007

His Beatitude Teoctist Grand Cross and Sash ranks of the Order of the Star of Romania
- By God's mercy, Archbishop of Bucharest, Metropolitan of Muntenia and Dobrogea, Locum tenens of the throne of Caesarea Cappadociae and Patriarch of the Romanian Orthodox Church, His Beatitude Patriarch Teoctist, Patriarch of All Romania
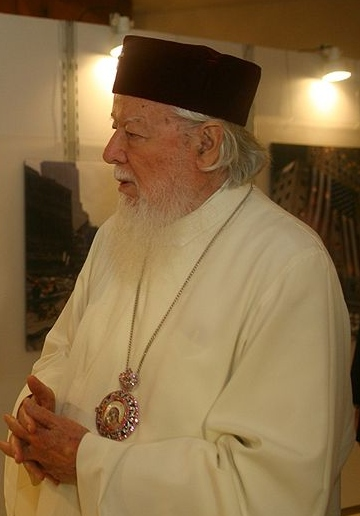
- Church: Romanian Orthodox Church
- See: Bucharest
- Installed: 16 November 1986
- Term ended: 30 July 2007
- Predecessor: Patriarch Iustin of Romania
- Successor: Patriarch Daniel of Romania

Orders
- Ordination: 25 March 1945
- Consecration: 5 March 1950

Personal details
- Born: Toader Arăpașu; 7 February 1915 Tocileni, Botoșani County
- Died: 30 July 2007 (aged 92) Bucharest
- Buried: Romanian Patriarchal Cathedral
- Denomination: Eastern Orthodox
- Parents: Dumitru Arăpașu; Marghioala Arăpașu
- Education: Faculty of Orthodox Theology

Member of the Great National Assembly of the Socialist Republic of Romania
- In office 1975–1989

Personal details
- Party: Iron Guard (before 1941); Front of Socialist Unity and Democracy (1975–1986)

Teoctist (Romanian pronunciation: [te.okˈtist], born Toader Arăpașu, 7 February 1915 – 30 July 2007) was the Patriarch of the Romanian Orthodox Church from 1986 to 2007.

Teoctist served his first years as patriarch in Communist Romania, and was accused by some of collaboration. He offered his resignation after the Romanian Revolution of 1989, but was soon restored to office and served a further 17 years.

A promoter of ecumenical dialogue, Patriarch Teoctist invited Pope John Paul II to visit Romania in 1999. It was the first visit of a Pope to a predominantly Eastern Orthodox country since the East-West Schism of 1054.

== Studies and ecclesiastic career ==
He was born as the tenth of eleven children of Dumitru and Marghioala Arăpașu, of Tocileni, Botoșani County. He attended the primary school in Tocileni (1921–1927).

In 1928, Arăpașu became a novice at Sihăstria Voronei hermitage, and later at Vorona Monastery. He became a monk on 6 August 1935 at the Bistrița-Neamț Monastery. In 1940, he began his studies at the Theology School of the University of Bucharest, from which he graduated in 1945. On 1 March 1945 he was sent to Iași, where he was ordained hieromonk on 25 March 1945, and archimandrite in 1946. Between 1946 and 1947, he studied Literature and Philosophy at the University of Iași.

At the beginning of 1947, the Holy Synod of the Romanian Orthodox Church revoked Arăpașu's archimandrite rank due to his pro-Communist opinions, the decision being published in the official newsletter of the Romanian Patriarchate, the "Biserica Ortodoxă Română".

== Ascension to the patriarchal chair ==
In 1948, Justinian became Patriarch of Romania and in 1950, Arăpașu became patriarchal bishop-vicar, being the secretary of the Holy Synod and the rector of the Theological Institute of Bucharest between 1950 and 1954.

In 1962, Arăpașu was named Bishop of Arad. In 1963, an attempt to make him the leader of the Romanian Orthodox community of the United States failed after the U.S. authorities refused to grant him a visa. In 1973, he became the archbishop of Craiova and Metropolitan of Oltenia and in 1977 the Metropolitan of Moldavia and Suceava.

In 1986, he became the Patriarch of the Romanian Orthodox Church. He was accused of obedience to the Communist authorities, culminating with the approval of the demolition of 26 historic churches in Bucharest.

Between 1975 and 1989, he was also a member of Marea Adunare Națională, the Romanian parliament. For instance, in the 1985 elections, he was elected to the Parliament, being the only candidate who ran in the 9th electoral district – Belcești (Iași County), being nominated by Gheorghe Zaharia, the Juridical Secretary of the County People's Council. He was also a delegate to the Socialist Unity and Democracy Front congresses and a member of Ceaușescu's National Peace Committee.

Styles of Patriarch Teoctist of Romania
- Reference style: His Beatitude
- Spoken style: Your Beatitude
- Religious style: Patriarch

== The 1989 Revolution ==
On 18 December 1989, at the start of the Romanian Revolution, the Holy Synod had a meeting in which Teoctist announced that he agreed with the repression of the anti-communist movement in Timișoara, claiming the events were caused by foreign interference. He sent a telegram to Ceaușescu, praising him for his "brilliant activity", "wise guidance", "daring thinking" and claiming that the Romanians live "in a golden age, properly and righteously bearing [Ceaușescu's] name".

Just a few hours after the Ceaușescus fled, Teoctist signed his resignation and fled incognito to the Sinaia Monastery, a location allegedly suggested to him by Gelu Voican Voiculescu. On 18 January 1990, the Holy Synod of the Romanian Orthodox Church accepted the patriarch's resignation by announcing that he retired from his office, without giving any motivation.

In April 1990, The Holy Synod unanimously revoked its decision to accept the resignation and Teoctist was reinstated, claiming that he withdrew temporarily for health reasons. According to the Tismăneanu Report, this has been seen by the Romanian intelligentsia as a harmful event and the start of the neo-Communist restoration in Romania.

== Activity after 1989 ==
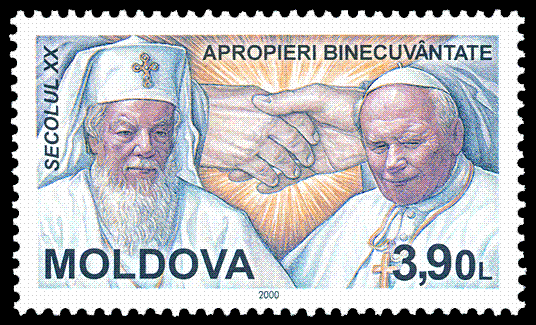
Teoctist and Pope John Paul II

After 1989, Arăpașu promoted religious education at all levels of education and founded new theological seminaries as well as schools for church singers, historical monument restoration, and other specialties. He also organized foreign scholarships.

In May 1999, Patriarch Teoctist received the visit of Pope John Paul II to Romania. This was the first time a Pope had visited a predominantly Eastern Orthodox country since the Great Schism in 1054, the event that separated Eastern Orthodoxy and Western Catholicism. On his arrival, the Patriarch and the President of Romania, Emil Constantinescu, greeted the Pope. The Patriarch stated, "The second millennium of Christian history began with a painful wounding of the unity of the Church; the end of this millennium has seen a real commitment to restoring Christian unity." On 9 May, the Pope and the Patriarch each attended a worship service (an Orthodox Liturgy and a Catholic Mass, respectively) conducted by the other. A crowd of hundreds of thousands of people turned up to attend the worship services, which were held in the open air.

In 2007, he criticized the Congregation for the Doctrine of the Faith's declaration on "Subsistit in" in Lumen Gentium, saying "We were stunned by such a statement, which troubles the entire Christian world."

== Controversy ==
=== Football team ===
In 1981, when he was the Metropolitan of Moldavia, Teoctist used money from the Orthodox Church to sponsor the Politehnica Iași football club and justified this as being an attempt to do something good for the local community.

=== Iron Guard and Securitate ===
After 1989, various accusations were made in the Romanian press, including that he was a collaborator of the Securitate, the political police in Romania, that he allegedly was homosexual and that as a "Legionnaire" (member of the "Legion of the Archangel Michael", an extreme-right Orthodox nationalistic movement of the interwar period, associated politically with the Iron Guard), he stored propaganda materials at the Cernica and Căldărușani monasteries and that he participated in the vandalizing of a Bucharest synagogue.

The last two accusations were based on a 1950 file found in the archives of the Securitate. The official response of the Orthodox Church was that the file was made by the Soviets with the intent of destroying the Romanian Orthodox Church.

In July 2006, historian Stejărel Olaru said he found in the archives of the Securitate documents which prove that Teoctist was an agent of influence, who did propaganda for the Communist regime. The accusations were publicly denied by the Church.

== Death ==
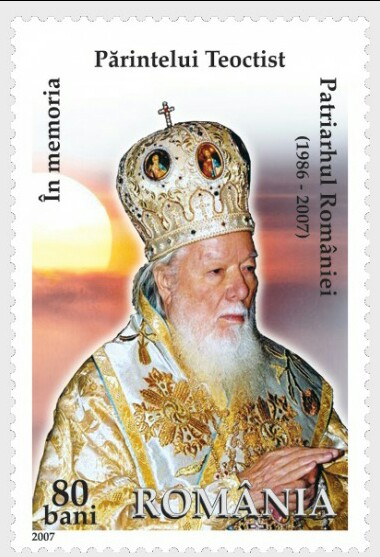
Teoctist memorial stamp from 2007

The Patriarch died on 30 July 2007, after undergoing surgery for a prostate adenoma at the Clinical Institute of Fundeni. The surgery was not an emergency, but a scheduled operation. Along the day, the news received suggested he was recovering. According to the doctors, the death occurred following cardiac complications, at 17:00 (GMT+2). The Patriarch had a history of cardiac problems. His body was laid in the Romanian Patriarchal Cathedral in Bucharest.

After the session of the Holy Synod of the Romanian Orthodox Church the date of burial was set for Friday 3 August 2007 at 11:00 (GMT+2) and took place at the Patriarchal Cathedral. PM Călin Popescu-Tăriceanu announced that the Government decided the date to be a National Day of Mourning. The burial place was chosen by the Holy Synod of the Romanian Orthodox Church to be the Patriarchal Cathedral and the burial service was officiated by Ecumenical Patriarch Bartholomew I, alongside Romanian Orthodox hierarchs and hierarchs representing churches of the Eastern Orthodox communion. After the religious service, the Patriarch was given state honors.

Delegations from 30 Orthodox Churches were present at the services. Taking part in the funeral itself were representatives from the churches of Constantinople, Albania, Russia, Bulgaria, Serbia, Finland, Alexandria, Antioch, Jerusalem, Greece, Cyprus, Poland and the Czech Republic. Also present were delegations from the Holy See, different Christian denominations (Anglican, Armenian Apostolic, Ethiopian Church and Syriac churches), other religious communities from Romania (The Romanian Muftiat) and Romanian political leaders. About 8,000 people attended the funeral.

== Notes ==
Eastern Orthodox Church titles
Preceded by Iustin Moisescu	Patriarch of All Romania; 1986–2007	Succeeded by Daniel Ciobotea
