= Vorona (Siret) =

- Location within Romania

Location
- Country: Romania
- Counties: Botoșani County
- Villages: Vorona, Vorona Mare, Joldești

Physical characteristics
- Mouth: Siret
  - location: Joldești
  - coordinates: 47.5577°N 26.5662°E
- Length: 17 km (11 mi)
- Basin size: 70 km^{2} (27 sq mi)

Basin features
- Progression: Siret→ Danube→ Black Sea
- Tributaries
  - left: Sihăstrie, Chișcovata
  - right: Poiana
- River code: XII.1.16

The Vorona is a left tributary of the river Siret in Romania. It flows into the Siret in Joldești. Its length is 17 km (11 mi) and its basin size is 70 km^{2} (27 sq mi).
