= Ghidighici =

- Village
- Location in Moldova
- Coordinates: 47°09′N 28°56′E
- Country: Moldova

Government
  - Mayor: Victoria Calmîș (PAS)

Population (2024 census)
  - Total: 5,240
- Time zone: UTC+2 (EET)
  - Summer (DST): UTC+3 (EEST)

Ghidighici is a village in Chișinău municipality, Moldova.

It is the location of the Ghidighici Reservoir.

== History ==
On November 1, 1942, King Michael I of Romania, his mother Helen, and Foreign Minister Mihai Antonescu joined the opening ceremony of the monumental Liberation Tower in Ghidighici. The tower was destroyed in 1944, after the Soviet re-occupation.
