= Liberation Tower, Bessarabia =

- Turnul Dezrobirii Basarabiei
- Interactive map of Liberation Tower, Bessarabia
- Location: Ghidighici, Chișinău
- Coordinates: 47°06′00″N 28°46′00″E
- Designer: Octav Doicescu; Dumitru Ghiulamila
- Material: Stone
- Length: 10 m (33 ft)
- Width: 10 m (33 ft)
- Height: 30 m (98 ft)
- Beginning date: August 1942
- Completion date: October 1942
- Opening date: 1 November 1942
- Dedicated to: The emancipation of Bessarabia

The Liberation Tower (Romanian: Turnul Dezrobirii Basarabiei) was a tower in Chișinău, Bessarabia. The tower, built in 1942, had a height of over 30 metres (98 ft). King Michael I of Romania, his mother, Helen of Greece and Denmark, and Foreign Minister Mihai Antonescu attended the opening ceremony on 1 November 1942, in Ghidighici.

The monument was located on a hill in front of the city of Chișinău, on the road to Ungheni. More than 500 workers worked on it for 60 days, in August–October 1942, using stone from the quarries in Ghidighici and Cricova. The structure consisted of three parts:

- The tower, made of white stone, square in shape and about 30 metrrs high.
- A stone block with a pisanie, in front of the tower, almost 8 metres high.
- A colonnade (propylaea), made of stone columns, on the right side of the tower.

The tower had 14 marble signs inlaid on its faces, representing the coats of arms of Romania, Bessarabia, Moldavia, and some important counties and cities wherein. The entrance to the tower was guarded by a bas-relief with a fragment from Trajan's Column and the following inscription: "Like Trajan's Column, we are where we were, and we remain where we are." Inside the tower there was a spiral staircase that led to a prayer room. The colonnade consisted of 24 stone pillars on which were inscribed the names of the units of the Romanian Army that had fought to regain control of Chișinău in July 1941, during Operation München.

The tower was destroyed in autumn 1944, after the Soviet re-occupation of Bessarabia. Nowadays, the spot were the Ghidighici tower was is covered by thick industrial waste.

== Bibliography ==
- Colesnic, Iurie (2004). Basarabia necunoscută (in Romanian) (5 ed.). Chișinău. ISBN 9975-906-92-3.
