= Vorona Monastery =

Monastery in Botoşani County, Romania

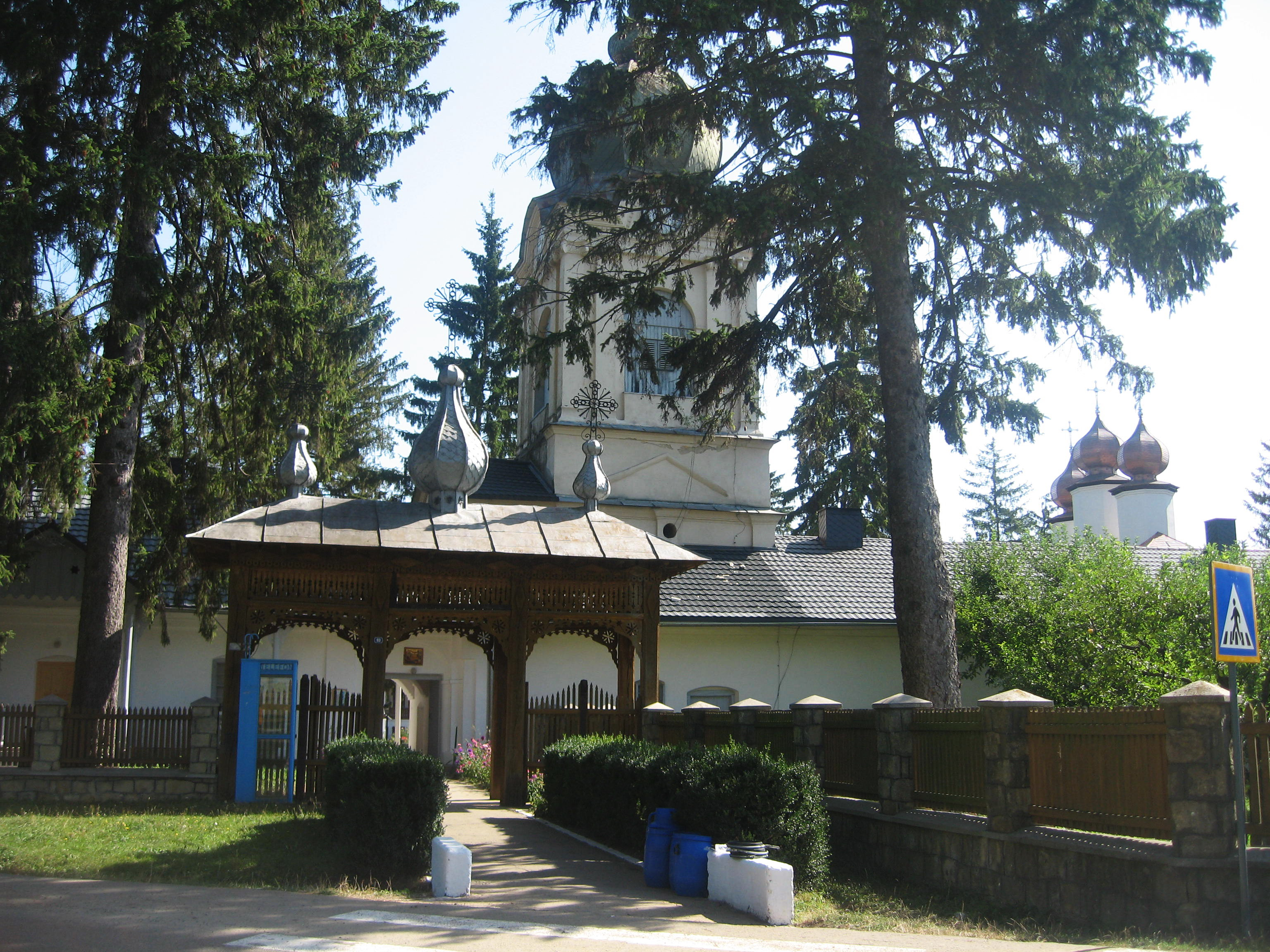
- Vorona Monastery

- Location within Romania

Monastery information
- Established: 1469

People
- Important associated figures: Teoctist Arăpașu

Site
- Location: Vorona, Botoșani County, Romania
- Coordinates: 47°34′47″N 26°39′57″E
- Public access: yes

Vorona Monastery is an Orthodox Monastery in Romania, situated on the territory of Vorona commune (Botoșani County). It is set amidst a forest 2 km away from Vorona village. It is listed as a historic monument by Romania's Ministry of Culture and National Identity.

== See also ==
- Teoctist Arăpașu
