= Stăuceni, Botoșani =

Stăuceni
- Commune
- Location in Botoșani County

- Location in Romania
- Coordinates: 47°44′N 26°45′E
- Country: Romania
- County: Botoșani
- Subdivisions: Stăuceni, Siliștea, Tocileni, Victoria

Government
  - Mayor (2024–2028): Cozmin Iulian Epuraș (PSD)
- Area: 43.65 km^{2} (16.85 sq mi)
- Elevation: 105 m (344 ft)
- Population (2021-12-01): 3,873
  - Density: 89/km^{2} (230/sq mi)
- Time zone: EET/EEST (UTC+2/+3)
- Postal code: 717355
- Area code: +40 x31
- Vehicle reg.: BT
- Website: comunastauceni.ro

Stăuceni is a commune in Botoșani County, Western Moldavia, Romania. It is composed of four villages: Siliștea, Stăuceni, Tocileni, and Victoria.

== Natives ==
- Teoctist Arăpașu
