= Bessarabian question =

Controversy over the ownership of the geographic region of Bessarabia

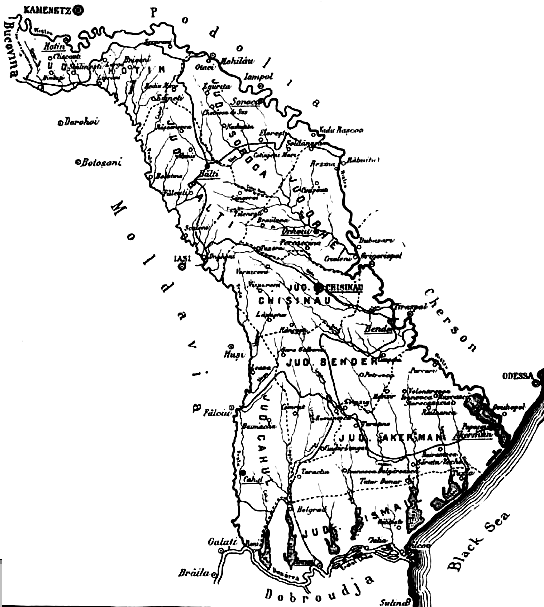
Map of Bessarabia

The Bessarabian question, Bessarabian issue or Bessarabian problem (Romanian: Problema basarabeană or chestiunea basarabeană; Russian: Бессарабский вопрос or бессарабская проблема; Ukrainian: Бессарабське питання or Бессарабська проблема) is the name given to the controversy over the ownership of the geographic region of Bessarabia that began with the annexation of the region by the Russian Empire from the Romanian principality of Moldavia in 1812 through the Treaty of Bucharest and which continued with the independence and union of Bessarabia with Romania in 1917, the occupation and annexation of the region by the Soviet Union in 1940, and the dissolution of the Soviet Union that caused the emergence of two new states that each controlled parts of Bessarabia: Moldova and Ukraine.

== Background ==
In 1812 the Russian Empire annexed Bessarabia from the Romanian principality of Moldavia through the Treaty of Bucharest. In Romanian nationalism, this event was seen as unacceptable. At the time, Moldavia was an Ottoman vassal. Due to this, Romanians would include Bessarabia on the irredentist project of Greater Romania, a state that would include all ethnically Romanian populations under its territory.

== World War I, interwar period and World War II ==
Administrative map of Greater Romania in 1930

In 1917 Bessarabia declared independence and united with Romania. However, in 1940, the Soviet Union occupied Bessarabia and also Northern Bukovina. Romania recaptured the regions in 1941 but the Soviet Union did the same again in 1944. Under Soviet rule, Bessarabia was split between the Ukrainian SSR and the new Moldavian SSR.

== Communist period ==
In the 1947 Paris Peace Treaty, the Soviet Union and Romania reaffirmed each other's borders, recognizing Bessarabia, Northern Bukovina and the Hertsa region as territory of the respective Soviet republics.

Throughout the early Cold War the issue of Bessarabia remained largely dormant in Romania. In the 1950s, research on history and of Bessarabia was a banned subject in Romania, as the Romanian Workers' Party tried to emphasise the links between the Romanians and Russians, the annexation being considered just a proof of Soviet Union's internationalism.

Starting with the 1960s Gheorghe Gheorghiu-Dej and Nicolae Ceaușescu practiced a policy of distancing from the Soviet Union, but the debate over Bessarabia was discussed only in scholarship fields such as historiography and linguistics, not at a political level.

As the Romania–Soviet Union relations reached an all-time low in the mid-1960s, Soviet scholars published historical papers on the "Struggle of Unification of Bessarabia with the Soviet motherland" (Artiom Lazarev) and the "Development of the Moldovan language" (Nicolae Corlățeanu). On the other side, the Romanian Academy published some notes by Karl Marx which talk about the "injustice" of the 1812 annexation of Bessarabia and Ceaușescu in a 1965 speech quoted a letter by Friedrich Engels in which he criticized the Russian annexation, while in another 1966 speech, he denounced the pre-World War II calls of the Romanian Communist Party for the Soviet annexation of Bessarabia and Bukovina.

The issue was brought to light whenever the relationships with the Soviets were waning, but never became a serious subject of high-level negotiations in itself. As late as November 1989, as Soviet support decreased, Ceaușescu brought up the Bessarabian question once again during the 14th Congress of the Romanian Communist Party, where he denounced the Soviet invasion and demanded the condemnation and annulment of all agreements concluded during the Second World War with Nazi Germany (implicitly the Molotov–Ribbentrop Pact), but without any modification of the borders of the European states.

== Recent history ==
After the Romanian Revolution, Romania's new president Ion Iliescu, and Soviet president Mikhail Gorbachev signed on 5 April 1991 a political treaty which among other things recognized the Soviet–Romanian border. However, Romania refused to ratify it. Romania and Russia eventually signed and ratified a treaty in 2003, after the independence of Moldova and Ukraine.

In the 21st century a movement to unify Moldova and Romania has gained popularity. Some Romanian nationalist groups claim the Ukrainian parts of Bessarabia and Bukovina despite the border between the two countries being solidified in a treaty in the early 2000s.
