= Treaty of Paris (1920) =

Failed 1920 treaty about Bessarabia

- Type: Multilateral peace treaty
- Signed: 28 October 1920
- Location: Paris, France
- Original signatories: Romania; France; United Kingdom; Italy; Japan (never ratified)
- Ratifiers: Romania, France, UK, Italy

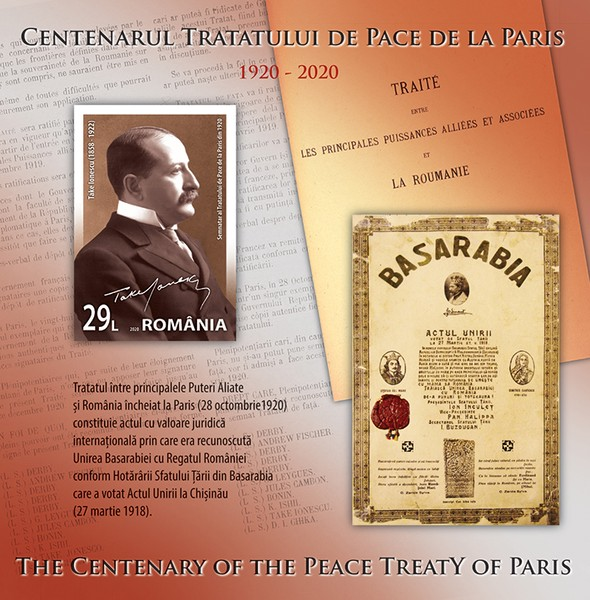
2020 Romanian postage stamp - The 100th Anniversary of the Paris Peace Treaty

The 1920 Treaty of Paris was an act signed by Romania and the principal Allied Powers of the time (France, United Kingdom, Italy and Japan) whose purpose was the recognition of Romanian sovereignty over Bessarabia. The treaty, however, never came into force because Japan failed to ratify it.

On 9 April 1918 (old style 27 March 1918), during the chaos of the Russian Civil War and following Romanian military intervention, the Bessarabian legislature (Sfatul Țării) voted in favor of the union of Bessarabia with Romania with 86 votes in favor, three against, and 36 abstentions, an act regarded by the Russians as a Romanian invasion.

As with the Treaty of Versailles, the 1920 treaty contained the Covenant of the League of Nations, and, as a result, it was not ratified by the United States. The United States refused initially to sign the Treaty on the grounds that Russia was not represented at the treaty conference.

The Paris Peace Treaty of 28 October 1920, formally recognized the union of Bessarabia with Romania. The union was recognized by the United Kingdom, France and Italy, but Japan did not ratify it, and the Soviet Union never recognized this Union.
