= Vorona, Botoșani =

Vorona
- Commune
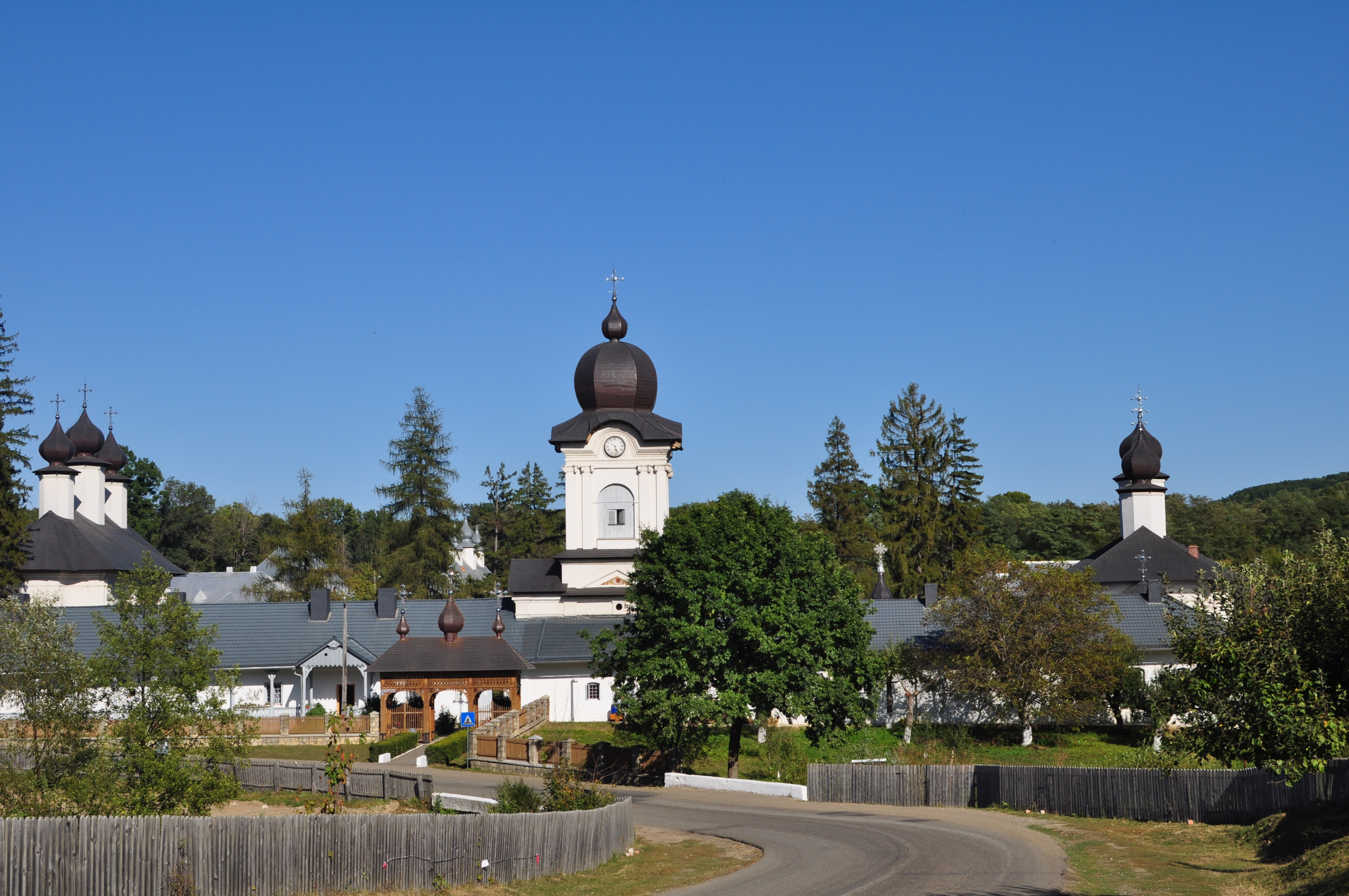
- Vorona Monastery

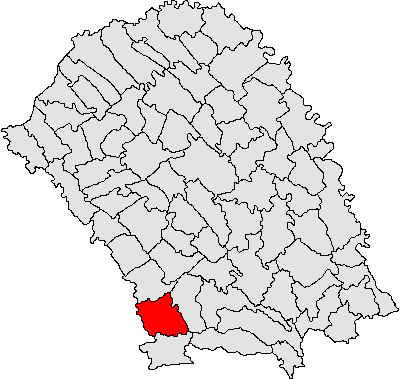
- Location in Botoșani County

- Location in Romania
- Coordinates: 47°36′N 26°38′E
- Country: Romania
- County: Botoșani

Government
  - Mayor (2020–2024): Aurel Ștefan (PSD)
- Area: 86.56 km^{2} (33.42 sq mi)
- Elevation: 265 m (869 ft)
- Population (2021-12-01): 6,636
  - Density: 76.66/km^{2} (198.6/sq mi)
- Time zone: UTC+02:00 (EET)
  - Summer (DST): UTC+03:00 (EEST)
- Postal code: 717475
- Vehicle reg.: BT
- Website: comunavorona.ro

Vorona is a commune in Botoșani County, Western Moldavia, Romania. It is composed of six villages: Icușeni, Joldești, Poiana, Vorona, Vorona Mare and Vorona-Teodoru.

The commune is located in the southwestern corner of the county, on the border with Suceava County, some 22 km (14 mi) south of the county seat, Botoșani, and 40 km (25 mi) southeast of Suceava International Airport.

Vorona is situated on the Suceava Plateau. It lies on the banks of the Siret River, and its left tributary, the river Vorona.

== See also ==
- Vorona Monastery
