= Dumitru Corbea =

Romanian writer and political activist (1910–2002)

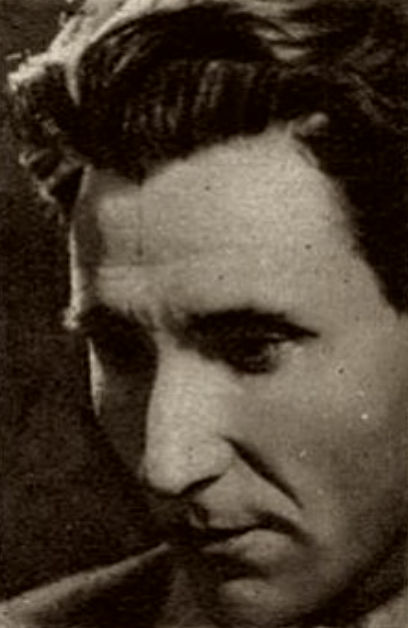
- Corbea in 1957
- Born: Dumitru Cobzaru; September 6, 1910; Sârbi-Vlăsinești, Dorohoi County, Kingdom of Romania
- Died: March 26, 2002 (aged 91); Bucharest, Romania
- Occupations: Journalist; activist; civil servant; laborer; schoolteacher; statistician
- Writing career
- Period: c. 1926–1986
- Genres: Lyric poetry; ballad; social poetry; political poetry; short story; reportage; social novel; historical novel; memoir; historical drama
- Literary movement: Poporanism; Proletarian literature; Socialist Realism

Dumitru Corbea (born Dumitru Cobzaru; September 6, 1910 – March 26, 2002) was a Romanian poet, prose writer, and political activist. Born into rural poverty in Western Moldavia, he worked a variety of jobs and was briefly an indentured servant. He aspired to literary greatness and cultivated himself, also being adopted as a child soldier in the Romanian Land Forces during the 1920s. He debuted as a poet in 1929, while studying for his commercial-school degree; committed to Romanian nationalism, he drifted into fascism, and, in the early 1930s, joined the Iron Guard. In 1935, Corbea switched to a rival revolutionary group, the Crusade of Romanianism, and went public with his radical critique of the Guard. He frequented the modernist club Sburătorul, but did not share its agenda—being instead committed to an updated version of Poporanism, which seeped into his poetry volumes. In tandem, he drifted toward the political left, joining the illegal Romanian Communist Party and, more publicly, the National Peasantists. His first arrest came during the parliamentary elections of 1937.

Under the National Renaissance Front regime, Corbea was protected by Labor Minister Mihai Ralea, finding permanent employment at the Social Service and the national radio company. He was called up under arms during the early stages of World War II, but rearrested and charged with spying in 1940; as the Iron Guard established its Legionary government, the military authorities preferred to set him free, and he spent time in hiding. The military dictatorship set up by Ion Antonescu allowed him to join the Central Institute of Statistics, but Corbea used his position there to protect communists and Jews—including upon being dispatched for fieldwork in Transnistria Governorate. He was forced to fight against the Red Army during the Odessa Offensive, but managed to make his way into Romania with the retreating troops. Networking with the resistance movement, he was an indirect participant in the anti-fascist coup of 1944. Its success allowed him to return from hiding and publicly join in Romania's communization.

An editor and photojournalist at Scînteia, Corbea documented Romanian participation in the Budapest offensive, before returning to partake in political and literary affairs. He was a prolific contributor of agitprop during the early stages of the Romanian communist regime, especially involved in promoting a personality cult for Gheorghe Gheorghiu-Dej. Despite his complete and lasting commitment to Socialist Realism, his stances were at times unorthodox: he always maintained a dose of nationalism, criticized agricultural collectivization, and, as comptroller at the Writers' Union of Romania, extended protection to marginalized authors such as Tudor Arghezi. Corbea was revered for his poetry after the regime had entered its national-communist stage, and, in the 1980s, published selective, at times controversial, memoirs. He also lived through the violent end of communism, dying at the age of 91.

== Early life and debut ==
Born in Sârbi-Vlăsinești, Dorohoi County, his parents Dumitru Cobzaru and Ecaterina (née Filipescu) were peasants. One of his grandfathers had served in the Land Forces during the 1870s war of independence. The Cobzarus also had one other son, Constantin, and five girls, who shared meager resources between them. As summarized by literary critic Mihai Ungheanu, Dumitru Jr had a "bitter rural childhood". His father was drafted when Romania entered World War I; the orders to leave for the front greatly upset him, and he nearly injured Dumitru Jr in a fit of rage. Though sometimes described as having been gunned down in the Battle of Mărășești, he succumbed to frostbite at a military hospital in Dorohoi. Ecaterina took charge of the family, and, driven by pity, shared her family budget with Bulgarian and Ottoman prisoners of war, who were being starved out at a labor camp outside Săveni.

Having to pay for his own tuition, Dumitru Jr worked from early on—a shepherd-in-training at his grandfather's pen. The first city he ever visited was Dorohoi, where he happened to witness a violin performance by George Enescu, the future internationally renowned composer. In 1923, he was taken by his maternal uncle to Iași, being told that he would be allowed to continue his studies. Instead, he was employed there as a shop boy, effectively sold by his relative. Though he resented the humiliation, he was taken aback with the shop's clients, who were major figures in Romanian literature. He tended on Mihail Sadoveanu, Ionel Teodoreanu and Demostene Botez, also reading portions of their books in his master's collection, and dreaming of following in their footsteps. Young Cobzaru escaped back to Sârbi, where he worked for himself and his mother. He was alternatively a farmhand, a cowherd, and a shepherd, but had a hard time surviving on the earnings, and decided to become an apprentice woodworker for Cohn's workshop in Ștefănești; he only learned to fashion crates, and was encouraged by a local lawyer to not give up on "book-learning".

Publicly humiliated by Cohn, the future Dumitru Corbea walked to Botoșani. He enlisted at a music school of the Orthodox Church (appearing as a choirboy alongside his brother), but studied intensely so as to be accepted into a state school, and passed with honors. He also supported himself as a servant of the local politician Petre Irimescu, and as such once attended on the operetta singer Nicolae Leonard; sacked because of his focus on improving himself scholastically, he was reduced to sleeping in the city morgue, before being accepted as a child soldier of the 37th Infantry Regiment. While there, he was reportedly subject to "beatings, abuse [and] terror". He began writing patriotic verse at the age of sixteen, having also embraced the tenets of Romanian nationalism. Early contributions included a humorous version of the carol Plugușorul, which was said to be widely popular in the Dorohoi area. His first publication was the 1929 poetry brochure Poezii patriotice. He is thought to have finished the lower-level course in Botoșani, at A. T. Laurian High School (1929). He disliked the elitist atmosphere, seeing himself as merely tolerate by his supposed peers.

Despite having earned the affections of his new commander, Cobzaru could no longer be stationed with 37th upon turning 18, and did not want to move to any other garrison. He therefore quit the army (formally discharged in 1932 as a corporal) and enrolled at Botoșani's superior commercial school. He was especially focused on learning French and other foreign languages, since these allowed him to indulge his passion for reading literature; for a while, he himself taught French at local School of Arts and Crafts. He finally graduated from the commercial school in 1935. He had already become politically and culturally, traveling to Bucharest in 1934; he began studying for admission into the Commercial Academy. Cobzaru's first political article raised awareness about the goings-on in Ipotești, where a cottage once owned by the national poet Mihai Eminescu had been condemned and stood to be demolished.

== Guardist and Crusader ==
By Corbea's own account, his first political affiliation was with the United Socialists, whose rallies he attended in 1934–1935, hearing speeches delivered by Mihail Gheorghiu Bujor—detailing Bujor's own experience in the October Revolution—and witnessing debates between various factions, including the Trotskyists. This claim is contradicted by researchers such as Dragoș Sdrobiș, who note instead that he was well-liked in right-wing circles and that he had formally joined the fascist Iron Guard in or around 1932. In November 1935, Cobzaru was monitored by the state secret service, Siguranța, which noted his affiliation with a left-wing splinter of the Guard—called "Crusade of Romanianism", and presided upon by Mihai Stelescu. According to Sdrobiș, he may have been active within that group as early as April or May, when the eponymous Crusader magazine hosted unsigned letters from Dorohoi that may be his; one such piece defends Sadoveanu, who was being heckled and intimidated by Guardist militants. The same journal also featured a poem in honor of the former communist Panait Istrati, which is signed as "J. Corbea". In his first signed piece, published in July 1935, Corbea openly attacks the Guardist leader, Corneliu Zelea Codreanu, hinting at his alleged homosexuality. Therein, Corbea invited the Guardists to present evidence to the contrary, offering to "blow my brains off" if proven wrong.

Cobzaru was also a regular attendee of the Sburătorul circle, which gathered in Eugen Lovinescu's home. Decades later, he recalled having been impressed with Lovinescu and other older peers, and estimated his time as a Sburătorul regular as "7–8 years, with interruptions". Corbea himself recalls that Lovinescu was discreetly warm in welcoming him there, but that he had more enthusiastic backers, including Bebs Delavrancea, Dinu Nicodin, and Liviu Rebreanu. Novelist Virgiliu Moscovici-Monda who heard him reading his poems at Sburătorul, suggests that he overcame initial reluctance by revealing himself as a genuine voice of the peasant class, rather than as an edulcorating neo-traditionalist. Monda likened his genuineness and appeal to the art of Henri Rousseau, as well as to Van Gogh's Potato Eaters. Novelist I. Peltz, who met him there, recalls that Corbea himself would join in the modernists' attack on traditional literature, but discreetly and reasonably, as a "well-mannered peasant" speaking in thick Moldavian dialect.

His first volume of poetry, signed as "Dumitru Corbea", appeared as Sânge de țăran ("Peasant Blood"). Its first edition, which Corbea intended to have stripped from public memory, appeared in 1935 at Stelescu's publishing house. A second print, published in early 1936, carried a preface by his childhood idol Botez, whom Cobzaru had again met at Istrati's funeral. Botez was genuinely impressed by the work, seeing it as a triumph for authenticity and primitivism, and claiming Corbea as a new adherent to the Poporanist school of thought. Peltz similarly notes that such social poetry was an outlet for Corbea's inner revolt, clashing with his otherwise calm demeanor. The volume was instead panned by the modernist Pompiliu Constantinescu, who quoted from it to make a point about the pitfalls of "talentless tendentiousness in social poetry", and overall about the bland nature of "artless authenticity". Literary historian Ovid S. Crohmălniceanu points to Corbea as one of the "lyrical exponents of the working classes" in an interwar context, finding him less interesting than Emilian Bucov.

Among the more modern critics, Marian Vasile agrees with Botez's assessment, suggesting that Corbea's Poporanist streak is also evident in his follow-up volumes, Război ("War", 1937), and Nu sunt cântăreț de stele ("I Sing Not to the Stars", 1940). Readmitted into the Romanian leftist movement, in February 1936 the newly re-baptized poet began a steady collaboration with Cuvântul Liber—his recruitment is seen by Sdrobiș as a tool used against the Iron Guard, since Corbea was by then known as Codreanu's personal enemy. He then collaborated with both Vremea and Viața Romînească; he met and took advice from literary doyens such as Rebreanu, Cezar Petrescu, Gala Galaction and N. D. Cocea, also being allowed by Mihai Ralea to join him and others at Viața Romînească's staff meetings. The young author was for a while affiliated with the left-wing club known as Amicii URSS, which advocated for a detente with the Soviet Union. Any thought of rejoining the Iron Guard was curbed in mid-1936, when Stelescu was assassinated by the Guardist Decemviri.

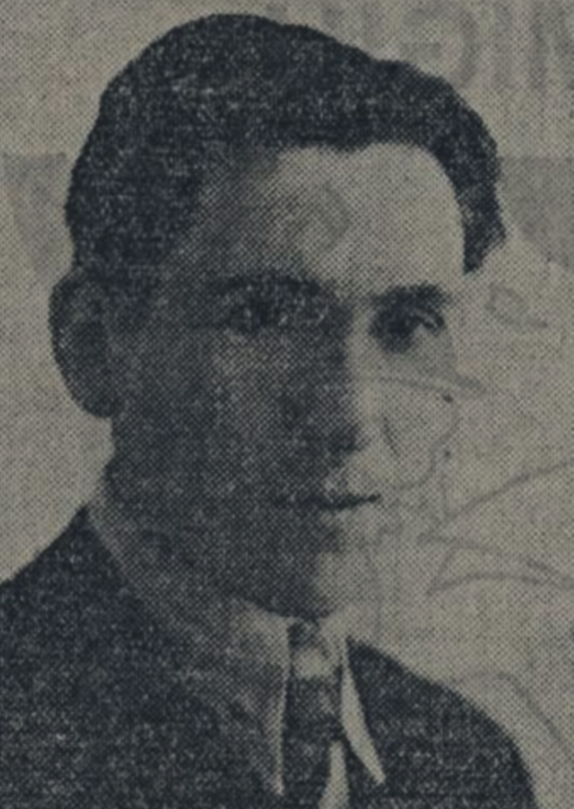
Corbea in 1937

For a while, Cobzaru remained attached to the Crusade, which circulated his thoughts on Orthodox-Church affairs. He was criticizing priests for neglecting their duties, while also fending off accusations that the Crusade was an "anti-Christian movement." The young man then made his anti-Guardist sentiments known with a pamphlet, Acuz ("I Accuse"), which saw print in 1937. The left-wing Adevărul declared it a "harsh confession" by "a pure soul, fished out from the vortex of hooligan politicking". Therein, he exposed Codreanu as a non-Romanian, argued that Stelescu had been assassinated because he knew too much, and concluded that the Guard wanted Romania to be enslaved by Nazi Germany. In tandem, his name was brought up at the trial of the Decemviri, with one defense witness claiming that Stelescu had paid Corbea some 3,000 lei to besmirch Codreanu, and reminding judges that the same poet had previously supported the Guard. In a 1950 report by the communist author Liviu Bratoloveanu (who may have been hiding his own past engagement with the Guard), Corbea is depicted is a naive man of noble intentions, who joined Stelescu voluntarily and risked his life in the process.

== In the communist underground ==
Corbea's drift into the far-left was unwittingly dated by Lovinescu in his diary entry for September 10, 1936: it details Corbea's visit and their conversation, during which Corbea depicted Zelea Codreanu as "a cretin". Lovinescu described these as "the recollections of a communist", but then changed the last word to "Guardist". Cobzaru joined the illegal Communist Party (PCR or PCdR), and, according to his standard biographies, found himself swiftly arrested by the authorities during a 1937 roundup. He himself explained that his affiliation was mainly with an informal circle of Marxists, which delivered illegal manifestos. However, as an associate of Ralea's, he had also recruited into the mainstream National Peasants' Party (PNȚ), and joined the editorial team of its central daily, Dreptatea. He later claimed that his induction was vetted by the PCR, who wanted him to strengthen that group's anti-fascist wing. As part of this effort, Cobzaru networked with the PNȚ chairman, Ion Mihalache, to whom Război was dedicated, and obtained praise for his stances from the party's ideologue, Constantin Rădulescu-Motru. He was also tasked with organizing the PNȚ youth section in Sârbi. According to Dreptatea, he was actually arrested in January 1938, just after the parliamentary elections of December, and charged with lèse-majesté; the same source claims that Corbea was being framed by the local Gendarmerie. The same argument was presented by Grigore Preoteasa in the left-wing review, Reporter, wherein he also called Corbea "a former Guardist" who had pledged himself to the "flag of Democracy".

During the campaign, Corbea reported actually been threatened by another far-right group, namely the National Christian Party (PNC), which had ended up forming the national cabinet. As Sdrobiș notes, if he did not state a similar claim regarding the Iron Guard, it is possibly because the PNȚ leadership had signed a temporary truce with Codreanu. He was released without incident, possibly just as the PNC government was recalled by King Carol II in February 1938; in April, he and Botez were present at an Istrati commemoration. Meanwhile, Carol abolished democracy and established a personal regime, before creating the National Renaissance Front (FRN) as the country's sole legal party. Ralea was co-opted by this new political machine, and made Carol's Minister of Labor. He extended protection to former associates such as Corbea: when Viața Romînească no longer afforded its regular staff, the communist poet found his pay supplemented by the ministry itself. Corbea was also formally employed by the Romanian Radio Broadcasting Company between 1938 and 1940; it was here that he met Corina Nichitovici, who became his wife. In 1939, he contributed discreetly anti-fascist literature in Zaharia Stancu's Azi. He was also hosting meetings of the Cadran group of communists, including Miron Constantinescu, at his garret overlooking Gemeni Square. Also then, Corbea was recruited by Dimitrie Gusti's Social Service, which was also attached to the FRN. Under Mihai Pop, he worked as a social researcher and a folklorist, spending time with the peasants of the Dâmbovnic valley. Years later, he declared this to have been a positive project, which allowed young city-dwellers to reconnect with the rural society, while also allowing them to spread modern knowledge in agronomy and social hygiene.

Due to his job with Gusti, Corbea happened to be present for the funeral in Călinești of the FRN leader Armand Călinescu, who had been assassinated by his Guardist enemies. The following months saw the outbreak of World War II, and Carol trying to address the likelihood that Nazi Germany would invade Romania. During the general mobilization, Corbea was called up under arms at Iași, noticing firsthand the army's ill-preparedness; while there, he lodged with his fellow left-wingers, Magda Isanos and Eusebiu Camilar, with whom he discussed the political crisis, up to and including the cession of Northern Transylvania. Corbea sensed that his life was in danger in the Guardist stronghold of Iași, and obtained transfer to the Social Service branch in Bucharest, thereafter resuming his activities as a folklorist. In May 1940, he reunited with Bujor and Constantin Popovici, the former of whom made him read works by the agrarian economist Henri Noilhan. He continued to associate with the PCR: in June, while still working at the Social Service, he asked for permission to publish a magazine of his own; the Siguranța refused to grant his request, describing him as an agent of communist interests.

Corbea was rearrested in October 1940, after the authorities had chanced upon him in a "border region" outside Bacău, leading to his prosecution as an alleged spy, and his detainment at a military facility. Meanwhile, the Guard had established its "National Legionary State", governing in partnership with army commander Ion Antonescu. Assisted by Camilar, Corbea used rivalries between the two sides, buying up protection from the army against any Guardist assailants. When the prison commanders could no longer vouch for his safety, he was paroled; he hid out in Ripiceni, working as a sugar-factory clerk under his old master Irimescu, and had discreet backing from the PNȚ leadership, going all the way up to Iuliu Maniu. He was sent before a military court, but was ultimately acquitted. He made his way back to Bucharest during the final weeks of 1940, only to find that most communists and dissident leftists had been sent to Antonescu's labor camps. This period ruined his friendship with Camilar, whom Corbea suspected of having tried to seduce his wife.

== Transnistria and postwar rise ==
After joining the Axis powers in the 1941 invasion of the Soviet Union, Romania, now fully controlled by Antonescu, ordered another clampdown of the PCR underground. Though not re-arrested, he was placed on an extended lists of communists, and continuously observed by the Siguranța. The latter institution recorded his residence as 11 Doctor Babeș Street (in Cotroceni). Corbea was allowed to join the Central Institute of Statistics (ICS)—in September 1941, he and Corneliu Mănescu became trainee statisticians of the second class. Together with Eugen Jebeleanu, they prepared logistics for the nationwide census of 1942. This effort, carried out from an ICS base in Cotroceni, involved numerous Romanian Jews, who offered up as volunteer statisticians in hopes of escaping labor and death camps. According to Corbea, he and other non-Jewish supervisors agreed to leave this workforce untapped, allowing Jewish youths to study rather than work on the census; they also formed volleyball teams, which offered them the opportunity to approach other communist sympathizers without causing suspicion. Antonescu meanwhile organized a Transnistria Governorate in the post-Soviet sphere of occupation, carving it out of the former Ukrainian SSR. Corbea was dispatched for that institution's field projects in Transnistria, which included an ethnographic survey of the Romanians in Ukraine.

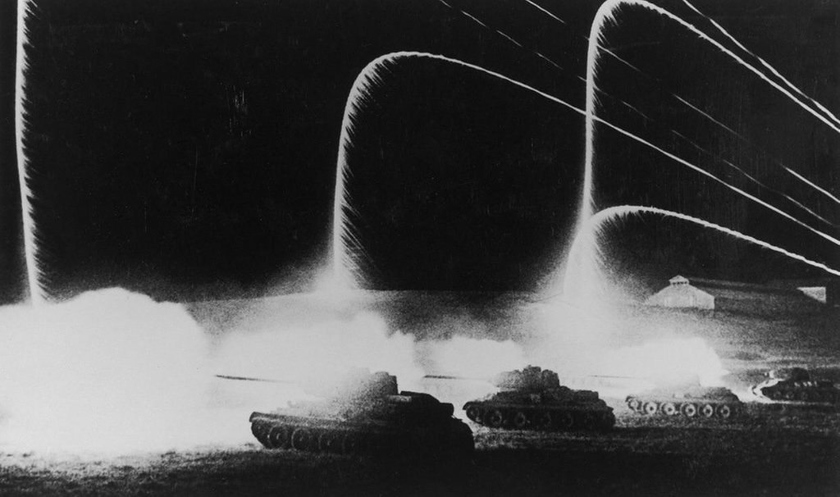
Night attack by Soviet T-34s during the Odessa Offensive of early 1944

While in Transnistria, Corbea and Mănescu observed traces of The Holocaust in Ukraine, and also helped rescue a Komsomol youth, Viktor Hanko, by forging his identity papers. Corbea himself tried to publish a new selection of his poems, as Candele păgâne ("Pagan Candles"). It was scheduled for publication in early 1943, but, according to one of his official biographies, "the fascist military censorship had it banned." In mid-1943, he visited the dying Lovinescu at a hospital in Bucharest, overcoming political differences that had caused them to drift apart from each other. In one of his autobiographic fragments, Corbea claimed to have gone into hiding, and to have assisted in helping Romanians desert on the Eastern Front. During the Soviet push-back in December 1943, he was called up for active duty alongside other communists kept under observation, and prepared to be sent into Crimea. He was instead moved to Odesa, which was facing a Soviet breakthrough in early 1944. Here, he and his garrison were commandeered by the Wehrmacht and made to dig trenches at Mannheim. According to his own recollections, he was wounded in the Soviet attack, then, in the confusion, had to kill off German officers who wanted him and his comrades shot as deserters; a Romanian colonel nearly had him shot for insubordination, but then changed his mind. Stopped by the Wehrmacht from crossing the Dniester Estuary, he made his way into a heavily shelled Odesa, and managed to catch the last ship sailing out to Sulina. Corbea also reports having seen Romanian war crimes—perpetrated against deserters and civilians alike.

By the time of Cobzaru's return to Bucharest, southern Romania was being regularly bombed from the air. The ICS had him relocated to Pucheni, which was insufficiently protected. In spring 1944, he escaped with his life when a bomb landed on his house and failed to explode; he was afterward granted a new home, in Naipu, while Corina was similarly sheltered in Hălchiu. Dumitru continued to live at their old apartment in Bucharest, but making it seem to the Siguranța that the place was uninhabited. He claims to have helped plan the anti-fascist coup of August 23 by storing weapons and ammunition, and thus by serving the Romanian resistance network in both Bucharest and Hălchiu. He then hid out with one of his sisters, Eramonda Hușneac, in Lugoj. He had to leave the town in a hurry when his brother-in-law threatened to denounce him as a "Bolshevik", and was helped on his way back to Bucharest by a Jewish girl, Irma Cohn.

Following the coup's success, Corbea reemerged as a communist intellectual. As a Scînteia editor, he was asked to become a photojournalist in Hungary, where Romanian forces had joined up with the Red Army. He was tasked with documenting the Battle of Debrecen, but ended up fighting with his submachine gun. He then followed the Budapest offensive, and was stationed at Cinkota—arriving there in the aftermath of pillaging by the Arrow Cross Party; he then followed the Romanian troops into southern Slovakia, observing the occupation of Brezno. In November 1944, he appeared at an official dinner, toasting to the Soviet occupation forces in Romania. His pseudonym became his official in 1945. He returned from the front in February of that year, and spent some time in Timișoara—where a PCR potentate, Alexandru Moghioroș, asked him talk the local poet, Petru Vintilă, into compliance with the party line. Alongside the PCR-sympathizing Sadoveanu, he attended Antonescu's trial by the Romanian People's Tribunal, and gave his impressions of the proceedings; he was also present at the great communist rally in Palace Square (24 February 1945), where unknown assailants shot on the crowd. He claimed to have stood by communist writer Mihnea Gheorghiu, who was left with a gaping leg-wound. Between 1946 and 1948, he was attached as a functionary to the PCR Central Committee.

In February 1946, Marxist scholar Barbu Lăzăreanu lectured at the PCR's Section for Political Education on the "poets of labor and poets as laborers", with ample comments on Corbea. The latter was by then a member of the PCR committee on art and culture, engaging in campaigning for the general election of November. In that capacity, he visited George Enescu, successfully recruiting him for the Bloc of Democratic Parties. During this electoral battle, which opposed the PCR-led Bloc to the PNȚ, his former colleagues at Dreptatea discussed the cases of former fascists who had turned PCR propagandists, noting that this label applied to Corbea, to Costin Murgescu, and to George Macovescu. Also at Dreptatea, Constant Tonegaru declared that he preferred to read "advertorials for this and that laxative" than have to engage with political poetry by Corbea and Miron Radu Paraschivescu. Corbea was instead upheld as a moral and literary examples by the younger Mihai Gafița and Veronica Porumbacu. In a January 1946 piece, the former critic discussed Corbea as one of the finest authors of the previous decade, and overall as one of the "progressive poets". In a set of articles printed in July–August of that year, Porumbacu argued that Corbea, Paraschivescu, Alexandru Toma and Emil Isac had produced "rich, ample works", living up to their interwar status as poets "on the same side as the people", and noted that they their style had been lit up by "the flame of the party".

Corbea returned to poetry with a selection of ballads (1946) and then with Hrisovul meu ("My Writ", 1947), described by Vasile as his last work as an authentic poet. In subsequent years, including a "plethora of booklets that appeared almost all at once", he was engaged in agitprop for the newly proclaimed communist state, versifying the life and works of Joseph Stalin, Ana Pauker, and Gheorghe Gheorghiu-Dej; already in 1949, he was focusing his praise on the latter figure. As observed by Sdrobiș, he had completed his transformation from far-right extremist to a "prolific Proletkult-like author, entirely subservient to communist totalitarianism", though conserving a "revolutionary spirit" in both incarnations. In 1946, Corbea published his first novel, Singura cale ("The Only Way"). Two years later, he also debuted as a dramatist, with Bălceștii ("The Bălcescus")—a three-act historical play commissioned by N. D. Cocea for the Wallachian Revolution centennial. It required that Corbea spent time in Bălcești, where he interviewed indirect descendants of revolutionary leader Nicolae Bălcescu. The resulting work was taken up by the National Theater Bucharest, with Aurel Ion Maican called in as director. However, it was shelved by the authorities, who preferred a similar play by Camil Petrescu.

== Albina and USR induction ==
On 14 September 1947, following a communist revamp of the Romanian Writers' Society, Corbea and Carol Ardeleanu became that group's auditors. Fully employed as editor of Albina magazine in 1948, Corbea tried to save this old-regime publication, which competed with the peasant version of Scînteia, from being closed by the party activists (including one he names only as "I. C."). He managed to keep it afloat as a voice of the socialist peasantry, obtaining contributions by the likes of Sadoveanu and Gala Galaction. He himself was sacked from his editorial position, then returned when Albina almost went under, but eventually conceded that the magazine had to become a PCR mouthpiece of declining quality. He claims to have been invited to serve on a high-ranking position at the Ministry of Culture, and vetted by its Soviet adviser Klushnikov, but also that he declined the offer, since he wanted to work only as a writer and a researcher of Romanian history; he did however accept appointment on the State Council for Cinema. During that period, he also carried on with his earlier work on revolutionary songs. Early on, one of his ballads, glorifying miners, had been turned into a musical piece by composer Sabin Drăgoi, whom Corbea greatly revered. His other poems were generally set to music by Mihail Andricu. Writing in December 1952, the communist journalist Mihu Dragomir suggested that musical arrangements had made Corbea, Toma, Mihai Beniuc and Eugen Jebeleanu into beloved artists of the people. In 1953, Beniuc himself proposed that Corbea stood out, and became likeable, especially through his insertions of Romanian folklore. As Vasile writes, Corbea's contributions were occasionally redeemed by notes of "vindictiveness", making them more valuable than mere encomiums.

In January 1950, Corbea informed the public that he was working on a social novel "about the toiling peasants" and an anthology of poetry by peasant authors, who had been discovered and published by Albina. Annie Bentoiu, whom he had employed as a typist on the latter project, recalls that the pieces were entirely ungrammatical, "terrifying", "not even up the standards of the first year of high school." Integrated within the newly formed Writers' Union (USR), Corbea was also sent to Botoșani, alongside Radu Boureanu—at a ceremony marking Eminescu's centennial. He was reportedly lambasted by the local communists, since he spoke openly about Eminescu's politics and recited from his nationalist poem, Scrisoarea III. In February, Corbea had to participate in the birthday ceremony for Toma. According to fellow USR member (and dissident diarist) Pericle Martinescu, he and Vladimir Cavarnali were "figureheads" in a party-arranged show.

Also in 1950, Corbea was working as a songwriter for the filming of Petru Dumitriu's novel, Nopțile din iunie. He had by then been made vice president of the USR Literary Fund, which handled financial rewards for authors that complied with communist guidelines. In October, Corbea paid homage to Sadoveanu, who was rubber-stamped as a candidate in that year's local elections. Martinescu privately recorded his own astonishment at the level of praise that Sadoveanu had received from Corbea and other guest speakers. In February of the next year, the USR commemorated another Romanian classic, Ion Luca Caragiale, with a ceremony that Martinescu describes as largely pointless: Corbea and other Romanians appeared as speakers, but only to read out translations from the "rigmaroles" of foreign guests (including Arkadi Perventsev, Shagdarjavyn Natsagdorj, Jiří Marek and Melpo Axioti), who had only a basic familiarity with Caragialesque prose.

Around 1949, Corbea was campaigning in support of agricultural collectivization, helping to establish collective farms at Roma and in Northern Dobruja. He then had an observing role for similar endeavors in Transylvania and Argeș. According to his own recollections, he was privately critical of the regime after witnessing firsthand the excesses of such endeavors and their toll on peasant life in the Apuseni Mountains; as reviewer Cornel Ungureanu observes, the poet relied on his own background to understand that which other PCR men would not. During returns to his native area, he was upset by government plans to confiscate and demolish houses owned by Enescu in Liveni and Cracalia, obtaing their partial conservation. Corbea was similarly irked by the issue of copyrights in Romania, since he now earned less than "before the war", finding the situation to be inadmissible. He presented his case to the USR, resulting in a generalized panic—those present feared that they would be arrested by the Securitate; instead, the regime agreed with Corbea, and the copyright law was ultimately amended. A period witness, Marcel Marcian, took a dimmer view of such episodes, arguing that Corbea, whose peasant origin made him a political asset, displayed a "performative moderation" that the party then learned to use for its own ends.

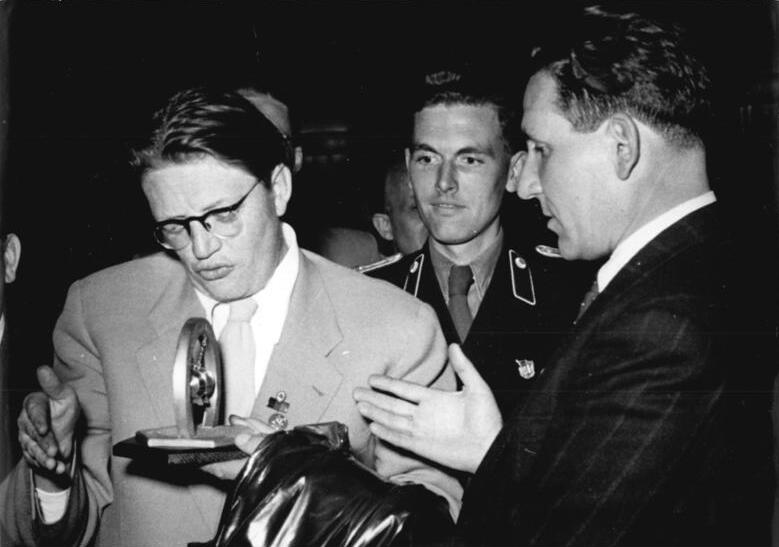
Corbea (on the right) engaged in conversation with Kurt Barthel during the 1952 congress of the German Writers' Union

Continuously active in the press, Corbea described the lives of tractor-drivers, and was upheld as a model in reportage-writing by Macovescu (June 1952). For a while, Corbea's lyrical focus was on the Korean War, during which Romanian communists cheered for the communist north. During a speech in December 1952, claiming to rely on unfiltered experiences from his travels abroad, he argued that American war crimes in Korea exceeded in terror precedents at both Auschwitz and Dresden. The PCR proposed him for a North Korean decoration in April 1953, citing his merits in depicting "the Korean people's heroic struggle". A poem of this series, called Oaste vitează popor corean ("Korean People, Courageous Army"), was set to music by Mauriciu Vescan, taking third prize at the national competition of 1954.

== De-Stalinization years ==
Corbea had been seriously injured, but not permanently incapacitated, during a writers' excursion to the Danube Delta in May 1952: he jumped in to rescue Sadoveanu from a near-collision between boats, and had two fingertips ripped off his right hand; first aid was administered by Virgiliu Moscovici-Monda, who was also a trained physician. He continued to write steadily, his poetry collected in Pentru inima ce arde ("To a Burning Heart", 1955). His 1950s output also included a novel, Așa am învățat carte ("That's How I Learned to Read", 1955), a collection of short stories (1956), as well as conferences and travel accounts—Anotimpuri ("Seasons", 1956), De peste mări și țări ("Overseas and Overland", 1959). Corbea wrote the screenplay for a historical-themed musical film, Barbu Lăutaru, which he finished in late 1953; his co-writer was the composer Filaret Barbu, with whom he had serious creative conflicts (since Barbu wanted to emphasize the comedic aspects of the story). A film was eventually in production, with Marietta Sadova and Liviu Ciulei called in to direct it. The production was stopped abruptly in winter 1954, officially because of Sadoveanu's objections (he vetoed the film for its unabashed depiction of slavery in a Romanian context); Corbea himself believed that Barbu Lăutaru was in fact rejected by other PCR figures, who resented its sympathetic depiction of Romanian nationalists, including Vasile Alecsandri.

Looking back on the period in 1984, Corbea declared his disappointment at having never received the State Prize, despite being nominated for it on three different occasions during the fifties. He explained that he had been snubbed due to "intrigues of our guild". He remained indebted to Socialist Realism well into the 1960s, and, as Vasile notes, colored his own childhood in its literary tenets (though I. Peltz contrarily notes him as one of the "objective raconteurs", he also credits Așa am învățat carte as a politically useful text). During 1954, as Gheorghiu-Dej, now the general secretary, began investigations into the communist credentials of various writers, Corbea was asked to weigh in regarding Oscar Lemnaru. According to Marcian, he displayed "a peasant's slyness", refusing to label Lemnaru a class enemy—but also indicating that he would submit to any majority vote on the matter.

After his positive experience in Bălcești, Corbea had helped to set up a writers' retreat in that town. The place was frequented by Paraschivescu and other communists, but also welcomed in Corbea's former employer, Tudor Teodorescu-Braniște, who had hitherto been a political prisoner of the regime. Also joining him there, Monda recalled him as congenial and devoted, "a man who jumps into work and helps his fellow man"; critic Valeriu Râpeanu similarly referred to him as a "decent, no-nonsense man". He publicly objected to the regime's marginalization of a major nonconformist poet, Tudor Arghezi, who, as he reports, had been pushed into material want and had turned to goat-herding for survival. His colleague Ion Brad reports that Corbea, "the golden-hearted peasant", used his position at the USR Literary Fund to pay Arghezi, even when the latter was riding out his "blackest years". Corbea rejoiced when he noticed his friend's progressive recovery, which began when Arghezi was invited over to meet his Yugoslav admirer, Josip Broz Tito.

Arghezi's recovery overlapped with the onset of de-Stalinization, as initiated in the Soviet Union by Nikita Khrushchev. Corbea was at the time engaged, like other writers, in reconnecting with the regime's proletarian basis, and spending time in various factories. In 1956, as Gheorghiu-Dej signaled the start of Romanian de-Stalinization, and blamed Pauker alone for past excesses, his poet also chimed in: with an interview in Gazeta Literară, he took a stand against the "cult of personality". This upset the political prisoner Petre Pandrea, who recalled that Corbea had "produced the most detestable Proletkult-like poems and cultivated the most sickening cult of personality." When Arghezi was allowed to join the People's Democratic Front, Corbea himself nominated him as a candidate in the parliamentary election of 1957. In his memoirs, he credits Gheorghiu-Dej with having personally ensured Arghezi's return as a poet laureate, suggesting that such rehabilitation could not have occurred sooner. In Marcian's account, Corbea was following party orders when approaching Arghezi, who was thus "won over" for the cause.

The regime entered the new era by relaunching Luceafărul, a literary magazine it aimed at the youth. Corbea was a regular contributor, and in February 1959 published his thoughts on the Soviet seven-year plan. Under a nominally daring question (namely, if "everything was being done to ensure happiness for the 'new' man"), he expressed his ongoing adherence to Soviet-style communism. Simultaneously, Corbea also participated in repression against other cultural figures, who had been identified as political suspects. He took a stand against his former friend Andricu, who had gone public with his critique of Gheorghiu-Dej; like actor Radu Beligan and director Sică Alexandrescu, he agreed to speak against Andricu at a public session held in April 1959.

Corbea also traveled abroad, including throughout the communist Far East—in September 1959, he was in North Vietnam, and traveled down to the Demilitarized Zone. His topical poem, La paralela 17, appeared in Contemporanul of January 1960. While in Hanoi, he noted that his personal friend Marin Preda, who had visited the previous year, had fully captured the Vietnamese writers' sympathy and imagination. Returning from this sojourn, he reportedly presented Sadoveanu with a ginseng root, which Sadoveanu then consumed; Crohmălniceanu claims that this caused the aging writer to develop a "congestion of the brain", which resulted in his death. Corbea was a admitted into the Romanian Society for Friendship with the Soviet Union, and in November 1959 sat on its Bureau, welcoming in Semyon Babayevsky on his visit to Bucharest. He was a member of the National Council for Peace, which functioned as a chapter of the World Peace Council, and as such spoke about the goals of worldwide disarmament, crediting Khrushchev as the person most interested in accomplishing that goal.

== Final decades ==
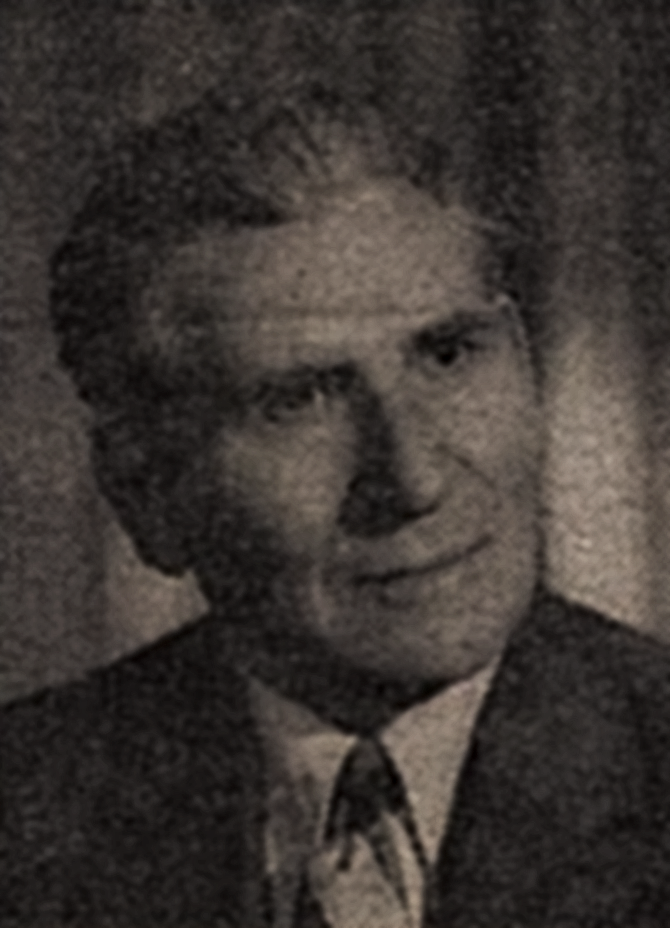
Portrait photograph of the aged Corbea, c. 1985

Corbea signaled Arghezi's full recovery in April 1960, when his senior friend was celebrating his 80th birthday. In an article for Gazeta Literară, he quoted at length from statements which showed Arghezi's appreciation for Marxism-Leninism and for Gheorghiu-Dej personally. In May, as the PCR (or "Workers' Party", as it was known at the time) prepared its general congress, he himself declared, with front-page articles in the same magazine, that all the nation was united in its goal of constructing socialism. An updated edition of Nu sunt cântăreț de stele appeared later that year, and was warmly welcomed by Brad in Scînteia Tineretului. From 1961, Corbea was Beniuc's deputy editor-in-chief at Luceafărul. He networked between the editorial staff and Arghezi, who was both hosted as a guest writer and invited to editorial meetings. During one of the latter, Corbea extracted from him stories of literary life in the 1900s—including one Arghezi's first, confrontational encounter with Caragiale. At the Literary Fund, he continued to assist various aging writers, said by him to have included Otilia Cazimir, Radu D. Rosetti, Stan Palanca, as well as his friend Peltz, who had survived imprisonment as an "enemy of the socialist regime". As a result of his intercession, Lovinescu's former wife received a state pension, despite not technically qualifying for it—since she had divorced Eugen long before his death. He also provided money for the singer Maria Tănase, who was terminally ill with tuberculosis, and who presented herself as a writer in order to supplement her income (out of charity, Corbea did not question her claim).

Following the change in stylistic guidelines which came with de-Stalinization, Corbea was mainly producing autobiographical prose, as in Puntea ("The Bridge", 1963) and Bădia ("Older Brother", 1966). He made occasional returns to songwriting, and in 1965 published the piece Vino acasă ("Come Home"), described by Tribuna's staff columnist as having an "unspeakably antiquated charm". Corbea himself tested the new political mood in summer 1964, when he attended another Eminescu festival in Brăila and, by his own account, spoke freely in front of a large, enthusiastic crowd. For a while in early 1971, he returned to his native village to look after his nonagenarian mother. She died in May of that year, an event which inspired him to write another poem. He was working on a historical novel, Patima dreptății ("A Passion for Justice"), appearing at Cartea Românească in 1973. Written on the basis of extensive research in the Apuseni (including notes shared with Veturia Goga), it revisited the Revolt of Horea, Cloșca, and Crișan in a manner that, reviewers noted, alternated freshness and conventionality.

Corbea's later works include a war-themed novel, Primejdia ("The Danger"), published in 1976. In this contribution, written as a communist's diary, Corbea did away with heroism, and presented the protagonist as occasionally giving in to cowardice. The aging writer produced the reportage collection called Ritm și viteză ("Rhythm and Speed", 1980). Reviewed by Vasile as a belated manifestation of Socialist Realism, it was approved for publication by Preda, who ran Cartea Românească. As noted by Corbea himself, this was one of the last projects taken up by the increasingly tired Preda, who was found dead "some days later". Corbea then published three volumes of memoirs (respectively published in 1982, 1984, and 1987); Ungheanu saluted him in this phase, admiring his frank retelling of life under early communism (and especially its details on Arghezi's persecution). Overall, however, such contributions were still "elliptic", with some episodes entirely absent, to the reader's bemusement. This discreetness was also commented upon by Sdrobiș, who observes that Corbea largely omitted mention of his association with Romanian fascism, excepting an oblique reference to his having once been duped by Codreanu's movement. Ungureanu viewed the books as "obligatory reading" for researchers of the literary phenomenon in the 1950s, but observed that they were often "belabored" and aesthetically "gauche". Folklorist Alexandru Cerna-Rădulescu also issued a public protest against Corbea, accusing him of having falsified historical records on Arghezi. In this reading, Corbea claimed to directly quote phrases that Arghezi could never have uttered, and that Corbea could never had heard.

In 1982, Corbea's works were still a standard feature of state-issued literary textbooks, and one of the modern authors that were most familiar to early-readers. He was returning annually to his native area, which had been incorporated into Botoșani County, and where he still owned his ancestral home—though he donated it to the County Culture Committee, who wished to house in it the Corbea Documentary Fund. In February 1984, the local magazine, Caiete Botoșănene, presented him with an award "for literary activity"; interviewed by local writer Dumitru Ignat, he declared that he still regarded himself as "a hundred percent" a peasant. In October of that year, he was at Sârbi, where he inaugurated a permanent exhibit of his own manuscripts and personal items. In November 1986, he was invited in as one of the region's more illustrious natives, to attend a special event within Cîntarea României festival. Having witnessed the Romanian Revolution of 1989, he died in Bucharest on March 26, 2002, almost ten years after his wife Corina. He left a daughter, Ileana. She shared her father's passion for Arghezi's work, but was overall interested in sports—having been an amateur parachutist, long jumper, and chess player. In the 1970s and '80s, she had been a producer at the Romanian Radio Broadcasting Company, putting out a book of interviews with several authors, including her father.
