= Bașeu =

- Location within Romania

Location
- Country: Romania
- Counties: Botoșani County
- Towns: Ștefănești

Physical characteristics
- Mouth: Prut
  - coordinates: 47.7878°N 27.2483°E
- Length: 118 km (73 mi)
- Basin size: 965 km^{2} (373 sq mi)
- Discharge
  - location: *
  - minimum: 0.06 m^{3}/s (2.1 cu ft/s)
  - maximum: 150 m^{3}/s (5,300 cu ft/s)

Basin features
- Progression: Prut→ Danube→ Black Sea

The Bașeu is a right tributary of the river Prut in Romania. It discharges into the Prut near Ștefănești, on the border with Moldova. Its length is 118 km (73 mi) and its basin size is 965 km^{2} (373 sq mi). It flows through the villages and towns Dămileni, Suharău, Bașeu, Hudești, Havârna, Gârbeni, Tătărășeni, Balinți, Galbeni, Negreni, Știubieni, Săveni, Vlăsinești, Sârbi, Hănești, Moara Jorii, Mihălășeni, Negrești, Păun, Năstase, Ștefănești.

== Tributaries ==
The following rivers are tributaries to the river Bașeu (from source to mouth):

- Left: Ursoi, Podriga, Bodeasa, Avrămeni, Sărata, Popoaia
- Right: Podul Popii, Ciolac, Pâșcov, Balinți, Glodul Alb, Răchita
