= Dresleuca =

- Location within Romania

Location
- Country: Romania
- Counties: Botoșani County
- Villages: Curtești, Bălușeni

Physical characteristics
- Mouth: Sitna
  - coordinates: 47.6848°N 26.8028°E
- Length: 27 km (17 mi)
- Basin size: 135 km^{2} (52 sq mi)
- Discharge
  - location: *
  - minimum: 0.006 m^{3}/s (0.21 cu ft/s)
  - maximum: 130 m^{3}/s (4,600 cu ft/s)

Basin features
- Progression: Sitna→ Jijia→ Prut→ Danube→ Black Sea
- Tributaries
  - left: Teașcu
  - right: Băiceni, Ionașcu
- River code: XIII.1.15.18.6

The Dresleuca is a right tributary of the river Sitna in Romania. It flows into the Sitna near Bălușenii Noi. Its length is 27 km (17 mi) and its basin size is 135 km^{2} (52 sq mi).
