= Băiceni =

Băiceni may refer to several places in Romania:

- Băiceni, a village in Curtești Commune, Botoșani County
- Băiceni, a village in Cucuteni Commune, Iași County
- Băiceni, a village in Todirești Commune, Iași County
- Băiceni (river), a tributary of the Dresleuca in Botoșani County
