= Cotârgaci =

Cotârgaci may refer to several places in Romania:

- Cotârgaci, a village in the commune Roma, Botoșani County
- Cotârgaci, a village in the commune Bălțați, Iași County
- Cotârgaci (river), a river in Botoșani County
