= Sărata (Bașeu) =

- Location within Romania

Location
- Country: Romania
- Counties: Botoșani County
- Villages: Borolea, Sărata-Basarab, Sărata

Physical characteristics
- Mouth: Bașeu
  - coordinates: 47.8739°N 27.0843°E
- Length: 20 km (12 mi)
- Basin size: 43 km^{2} (17 sq mi)
- Discharge
  - location: *
  - minimum: 0.002 m^{3}/s (0.071 cu ft/s)
  - maximum: 34.9 m^{3}/s (1,230 cu ft/s)

Basin features
- Progression: Bașeu→ Prut→ Danube→ Black Sea

The Sărata is a left tributary of the river Bașeu in Romania. It discharges into the Bașeu in Mihălășeni. Its length is 20 km (12 mi) and its basin size is 43 km^{2} (17 sq mi).
