= Siliștea (Morișca) =

- Location within Romania

Location
- Country: Romania
- Counties: Botoșani County

Physical characteristics
- Mouth: Morișca
  - coordinates: 47.8220°N 26.6455°E
- Length: 12 km (7.5 mi)
- Basin size: 32 km^{2} (12 sq mi)
- Discharge
  - minimum: 0.001 m^{3}/s (0.035 cu ft/s)
  - maximum: 10.10 m^{3}/s (357 cu ft/s)

Basin features
- Progression: Morișca→ Sitna→ Jijia→ Prut→ Danube→ Black Sea
- River code: XIII.1.15.18.5.3

The Siliștea is a left tributary of the river Morișca in Romania. It flows into the Morișca near Costești. Its length is 12 km (7.5 mi) and its basin size is 32 km^{2} (12 sq mi).
