= Bodeasa =

Bodeasa may refer to several places in Romania:

- Bodeasa, a village in Dealu Morii Commune, Bacău County
- Bodeasa, a village in Săveni town, Botoșani County
- Bodeasa (river), a tributary of the Bașeu in Botoșani County
