= Lesmânița =

- Location within Romania

Location
- Country: Romania
- Counties: Botoșani County
- Villages: Eșanca, Lișmănița

Physical characteristics
- Mouth: Podriga
  - coordinates: 48.1195°N 26.6883°E
- Length: 11 km (6.8 mi)
- Basin size: 49 km^{2} (19 sq mi)
- Discharge
  - location: *
  - minimum: 0.002 m^{3}/s (0.071 cu ft/s)
  - maximum: 39.8 m^{3}/s (1,410 cu ft/s)

Basin features
- Progression: Podriga→ Bașeu→ Prut→ Danube→ Black Sea
- River code: XIII.1.10.6.2

The Lesmânița is a left tributary of the river Podriga in Romania. It flows into the Podriga in Seliștea. Its length is 11 km (6.8 mi) and its basin size is 49 km^{2} (19 sq mi).
