= Cotârgaci (river) =

- Location within Romania

Location
- Country: Romania
- Counties: Botoșani County
- Villages: Cotârgaci

Physical characteristics
- Mouth: Morișca
  - coordinates: 47.8379°N 26.5909°E
- Length: 16 km (9.9 mi)
- Basin size: 27 km^{2} (10 sq mi)
- Discharge
  - minimum: 0.004 m^{3}/s (0.14 cu ft/s)
  - maximum: 8.6 m^{3}/s (300 cu ft/s)

Basin features
- Progression: Morișca→ Sitna→ Jijia→ Prut→ Danube→ Black Sea
- River code: XIII.1.15.18.5.1

The Cotârgaci is a right tributary of the river Morișca in Romania. It flows into the Morișca in the village Roma. Its length is 16 km (9.9 mi) and its basin size is 27 km^{2} (10 sq mi).
