= Ciolac =

- Location within Romania

Location
- Country: Romania
- Counties: Botoșani County
- Villages: Arborea, Stânca

Physical characteristics
- Mouth: Bașeu
  - coordinates: 48.1078°N 26.5487°E
- Length: 10 km (6.2 mi)
- Basin size: 46 km^{2} (18 sq mi)
- Discharge
  - location: *
  - minimum: 0.002 m^{3}/s (0.071 cu ft/s)
  - maximum: 37.3 m^{3}/s (1,320 cu ft/s)

Basin features
- Progression: Bașeu→ Prut→ Danube→ Black Sea
- River code: XIII.1.10.3

The Ciolac is a right tributary of the river Bașeu in Romania. It flows into the Bașeu near Hudești. Its length is 10 km (6.2 mi) and its basin size is 46 km^{2} (18 sq mi).
