= Dragalina =

Dragalina may refer to:

- Dragalina, Călărași, a commune in Romania
- Dragalina, a village in Cristinești Commune, Botoșani County, Romania
- Dragalina, a village in Hlipiceni Commune, Botoșani County, Romania
- Tutova, Vaslui, a commune in Vaslui County, Romania
- Corneliu Dragalina
- Ion Dragalina
