= Morișca =

- Location within Romania

Location
- Country: Romania
- Counties: Botoșani County
- Villages: Roma, Costești

Physical characteristics
- Mouth: Sitna
  - coordinates: 47.7303°N 26.7514°E
- Length: 41 km (25 mi)
- Basin size: 192 km^{2} (74 sq mi)
- Discharge
  - location: *
  - minimum: 0.004 m^{3}/s (0.14 cu ft/s)
  - maximum: 145 m^{3}/s (5,100 cu ft/s)

Basin features
- Progression: Sitna→ Jijia→ Prut→ Danube→ Black Sea
- Tributaries
  - left: Porcăreasa, Siliștea, Iazul Lipoveanului
  - right: Cotârgaci
- River code: XIII.1.15.18.5

The Morișca is a left tributary of the river Sitna in Romania. It flows into the Sitna in Stăuceni. Its length is 41 km (25 mi) and its basin size is 192 km^{2} (74 sq mi).
