= Dolina (Leorda) =

- Location within Romania

Location
- Country: Romania
- Counties: Botoșani County
- Villages: Mitoc, Dolina, Leorda

Physical characteristics
- Mouth: Sitna
  - coordinates: 47.8152°N 26.4879°E
- Length: 11 km (6.8 mi)
- Basin size: 25 km^{2} (9.7 sq mi)
- Discharge
  - location: *
  - minimum: 0 m^{3}/s (0 cu ft/s)
  - maximum: 7.90 m^{3}/s (279 cu ft/s)

Basin features
- Progression: Sitna→ Jijia→ Prut→ Danube→ Black Sea
- River code: XIII.1.15.18.2

The Dolina is a left tributary of the river Sitna in Romania. It flows into the Sitna in Leorda. Its length is 11 km (6.8 mi) and its basin size is 25 km^{2} (9.7 sq mi).
