= Băiceni (river) =

- Location within Romania

Location
- Country: Romania
- Counties: Botoșani County
- Villages: Agafton, Băiceni

Physical characteristics
- Mouth: Dresleuca
  - coordinates: 47.6998°N 26.6858°E
- Length: 13 km (8.1 mi)
- Basin size: 30 km^{2} (12 sq mi)
- Discharge
  - location: *
  - minimum: 0 m^{3}/s (0 cu ft/s)
  - maximum: 9.50 m^{3}/s (335 cu ft/s)

Basin features
- Progression: Dresleuca→ Sitna→ Jijia→ Prut→ Danube→ Black Sea
- River code: XIII.1.15.18.6.1

The Băiceni is a right tributary of the river Dresleuca in Romania. It flows into the Dresleuca near Curtești. Its length is 13 km (8.1 mi) and its basin size is 30 km^{2} (12 sq mi).
