= Avrămeni (river) =

- Location within Romania

Location
- Country: Romania
- Counties: Botoșani County
- Villages: Avrămeni

Physical characteristics
- Mouth: Bașeu
  - coordinates: 47.9106°N 26.9845°E
- Length: 12 km (7.5 mi)
- Basin size: 33 km^{2} (13 sq mi)
- Discharge
  - location: *
  - minimum: 0.002 m^{3}/s (0.071 cu ft/s)
  - maximum: 26.8 m^{3}/s (950 cu ft/s)

Basin features
- Progression: Bașeu→ Prut→ Danube→ Black Sea
- River code: XIII.1.10.9

The Avrămeni is a left tributary of the river Bașeu in Romania. It flows into the Bașeu in Hănești. Its length is 12 km (7.5 mi) and its basin size is 33 km^{2} (13 sq mi).
