= Chelis =

Chelis may refer to:

- Chelis (moth), a genus of tiger moths
- Chelís (football manager) (born 1959), Mexican football manager
- Cheliș, a village in Sulița Commune, Botoșani County, Romania
