= Wojciech Weiss =

Polish painter and draughtsman

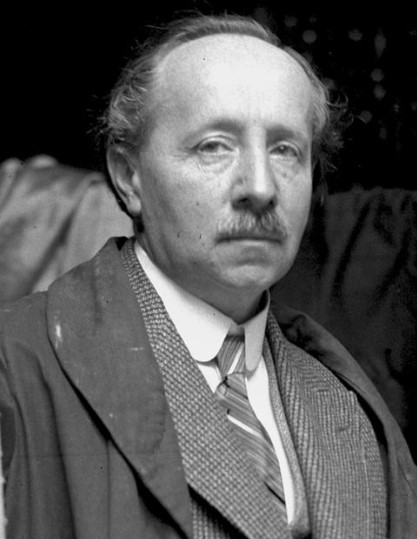
- Born: 4 May 1875; Leorda, Bukovina, Austria-Hungary
- Died: 7 December 1950 (aged 75); Kraków, Poland
- Occupation: Painter
- Notable work: Melancholic; Self-Portrait with Masks; The Demon; Manifesto
- Movement: Expressionism, Symbolism

Wojciech Weiss (4 May 1875 – 7 December 1950) was a prominent Polish painter and draughtsman of the Young Poland movement.

Weiss was born in Bukovina to a Polish family in exile of Stanisław Weiss and Maria Kopaczyńska. He gave up music training to study art at the Academy of Fine Arts in Kraków under Leon Wyczółkowski. Weiss originally painted historical or mythological paintings, but later switched to Expressionism after being profoundly influenced by Stanisław Przybyszewski. Weiss later became a member of the Vienna Secession. He was one of the first Polish Art Nouveau poster designers. Near the end of his life, he made several significant contributions to paintings of the Socialist realism in Poland.

== Selected paintings ==
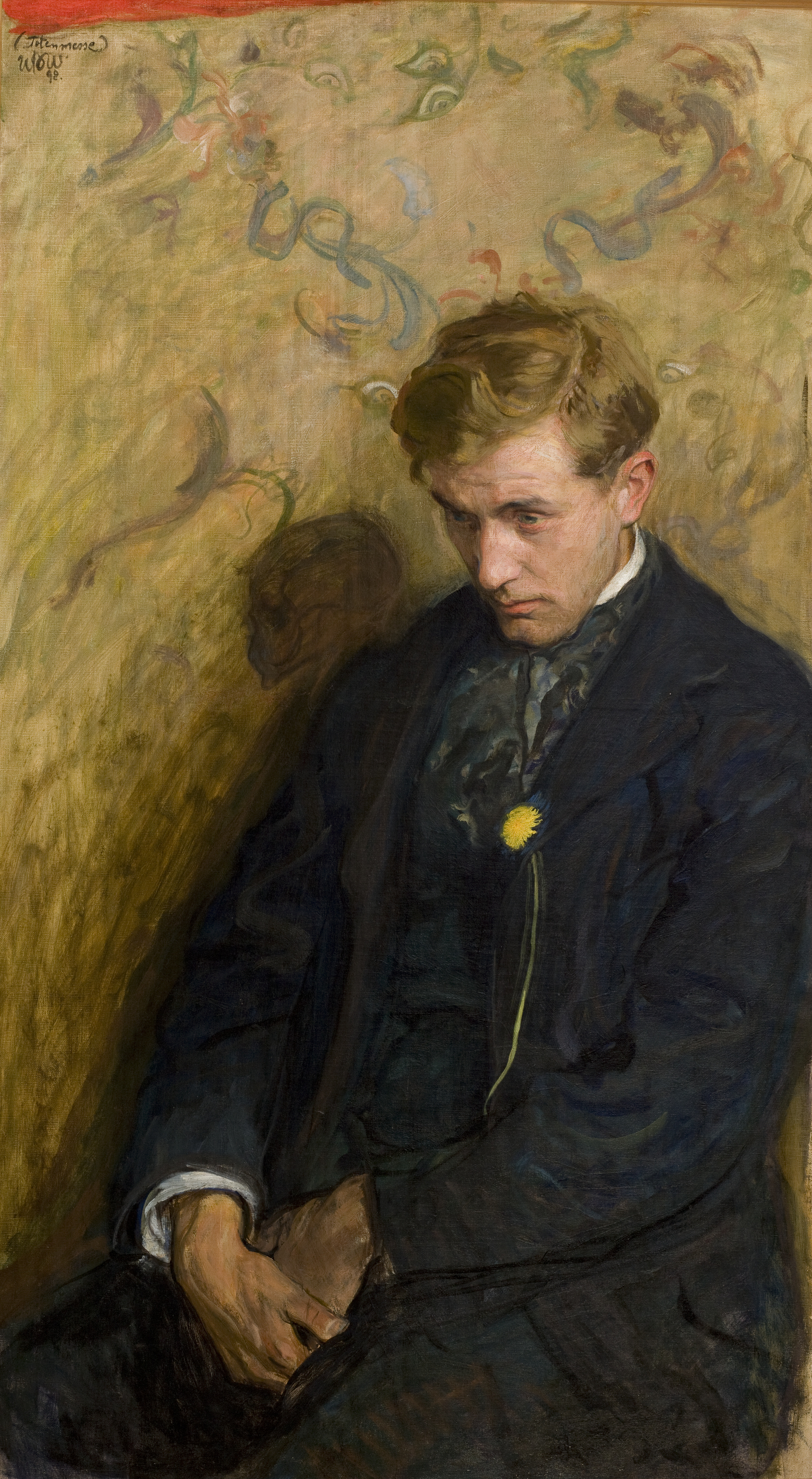
Melancholic, 1898, National Museum in Kraków

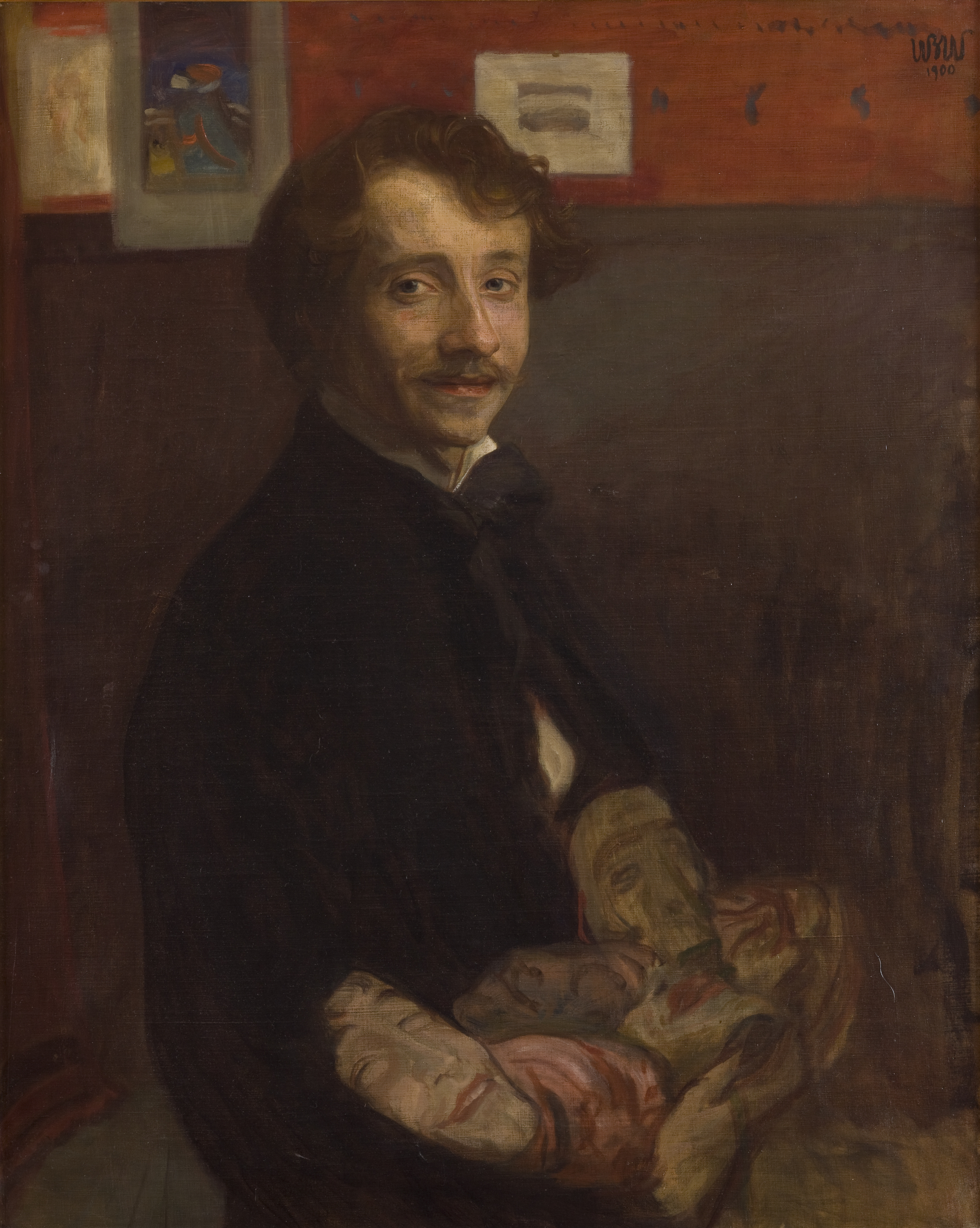
Self-Portrait with Masks, 1900, National Museum in Kraków

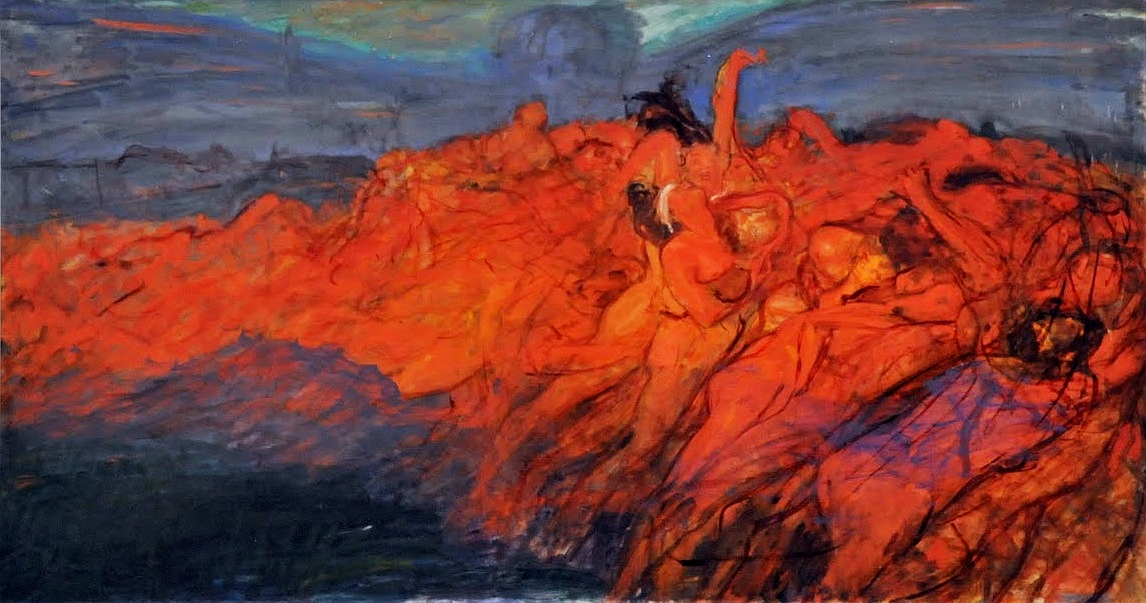
Obsession, 1899–1900, National Museum in Warsaw

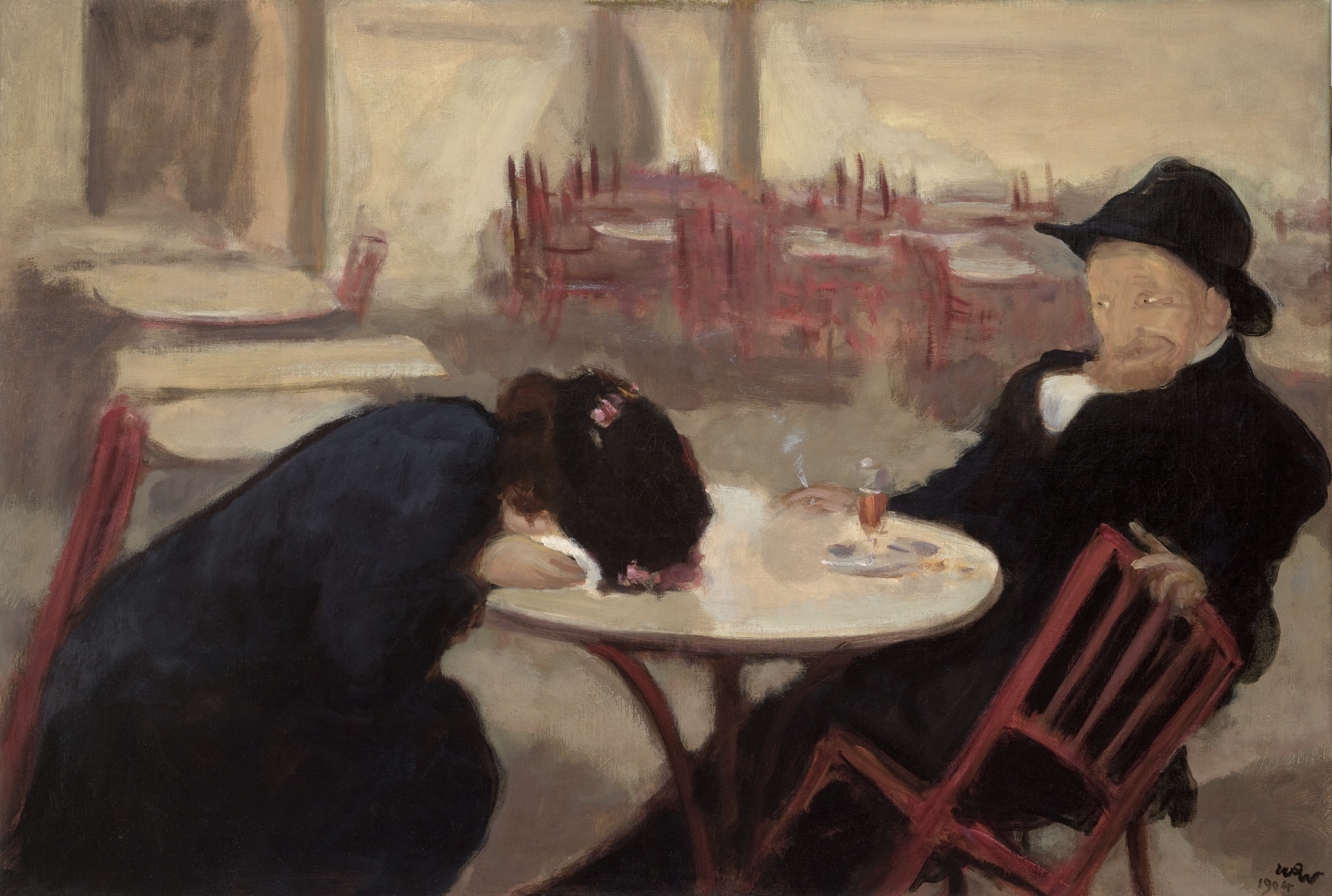
The Demon, 1904, National Museum in Kraków

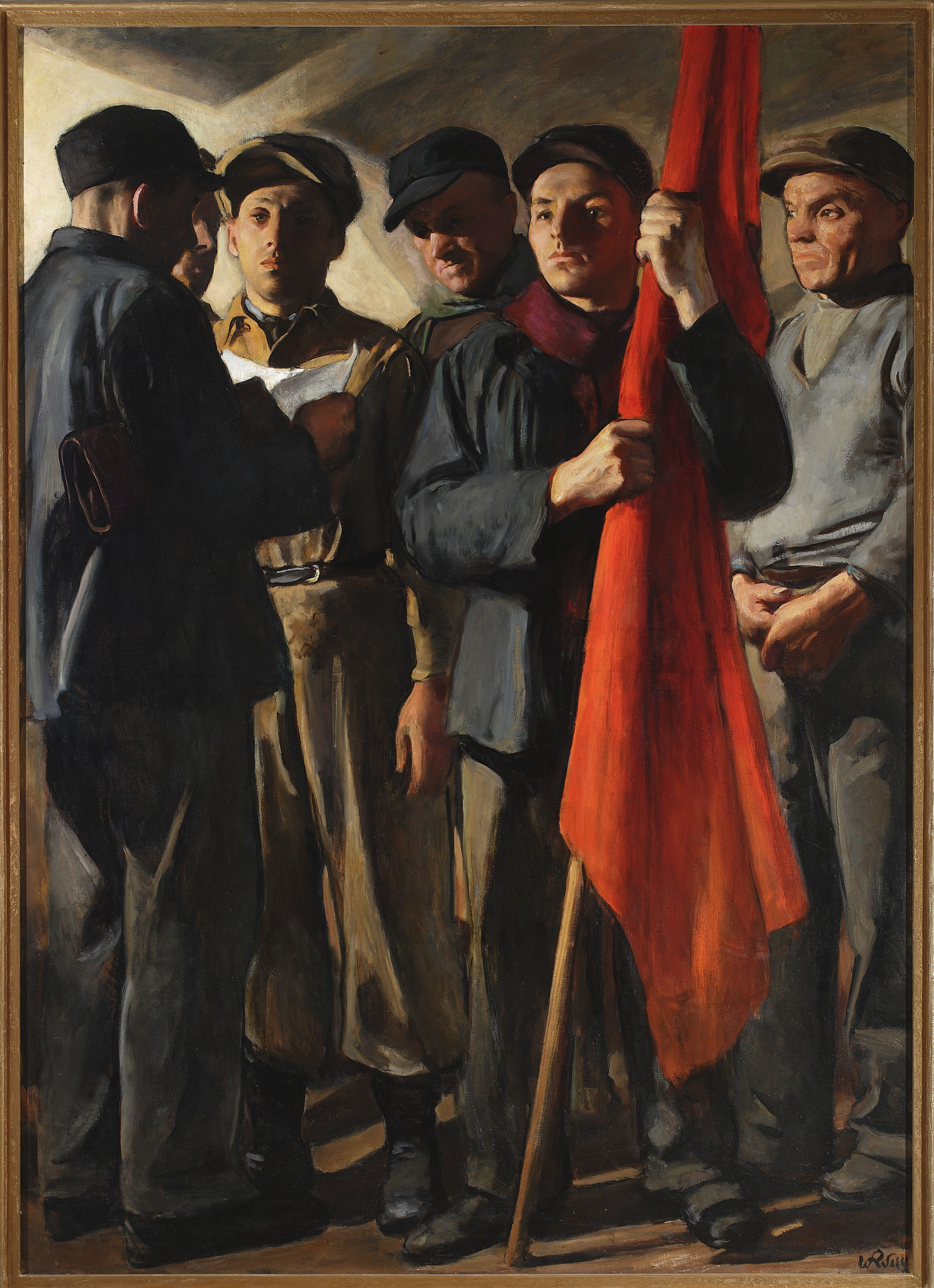
Manifesto, 1949–1950, National Museum in Warsaw
