= Burla (Sitna) =

- Location within Romania

Location
- Country: Romania
- Counties: Botoșani County

Physical characteristics
- Mouth: Sitna
  - coordinates: 47.6381°N 26.9381°E
- Length: 35 km (22 mi)
- Basin size: 166 km^{2} (64 sq mi)
- Discharge
  - location: *
  - minimum: 0.002 m^{3}/s (0.071 cu ft/s)
  - maximum: 135 m^{3}/s (4,800 cu ft/s)

Basin features
- Progression: Sitna→ Jijia→ Prut→ Danube→ Black Sea
- Tributaries
  - left: Valea Satului, Valea lui Hurjui
  - right: Puturosul

The Burla is a left tributary of the river Sitna in Romania. It discharges into the Sitna in Sulița. Its length is 35 km (22 mi) and its basin size is 166 km^{2} (64 sq mi).
