= Copyright law of Moldova =

Coat of arms of Moldova

The copyright law of Moldova regulates the copyright laws of Moldova. The first official decree related to copyrights in the country was made on 25 November 1991, shortly after its independence on 27 August of the same year. On 25 May 1991, the State Agency on the Protection of Industrial Property (AGEPI) was created, making it the second copyright agency in the country together with the State Agency for Copyright (ADA). In 1993, Moldova signed an agreement on cooperation in the protection of copyright and the related rights between it and other countries, all members of the Commonwealth of Independent States (CIS), which only came into force in 1999. By that time, Moldova had already created its official copyright law: Law No. 293-XIII, from 1994 but applied it since 1995.

The Moldovan copyright agencies merged in 2004, thus creating the State Agency for Intellectual Property (AGEPI as well). Finally, Moldova replaced the 1994 law with a new one in 2011. The European Union (EU) participated in its drafting to help the country have laws compatible with the most important international copyright treaties.

== History ==
On 27 August 1991, the Republic of Moldova declared its independence from the Soviet Union (USSR) and became a new country. Following this, on 25 November, President Mircea Snegur promulgated Decree No. 238 on the State Agency for Copyright (ADA), subordinated to the government and created to guarantee the protection and legitimate interests of authors and their literary, scientific and artistic works, including related rights. On 25 May 1992, by Presidential Decree No. 120, the State Agency on the Protection of Industrial Property (AGEPI) was established under the Ministry of Finance of Moldova. The purpose of the creation of AGEPI was the legal protection of industrial property in the republic's soil. In 1995, pursuant to Article 37 of Law No. 461 of 18 May 1995 and Governmental Decree No. 743 of 31 December 1996, AGEPI received the status of state-owned enterprise under its jurisdiction. On 1 January 1995, Law No. 293-XIII of 23 November 1994 on copyright and related rights entered into force in Moldova.

In 1993, the Commonwealth of Independent States (CIS) adopted an agreement on cooperation in the field of protection of copyright and the related rights between its member states at the time. These included Moldova, but also Azerbaijan, Armenia, Belarus, Georgia, Kazakhstan, Kyrgyzstan, Russia, Tajikistan, Turkmenistan, Uzbekistan and Ukraine. The function of this agreement was to ensure compliance with international copyright obligations that were in force in the Soviet Union after the ratification of the Universal Copyright Convention (UCC) in the territories of the former USSR. Signatories recognized de jure the legal succession of the CIS from the USSR regarding the field of the application of the norms of the UCC, adopted by the USSR in 1973. In Moldova, the agreement entered into force only in 1999.

On 13 September 2004, the State Agency for Copyright (ADA) and the State Agency for the Protection of Industrial Property (AGEPI) merged and created a new state agency, the State Agency for Intellectual Property, also abbreviated as AGEPI.

On 1 January 2011, a new law on copyright and related rights adopted on 2010 came into force, replacing the 1994 law. Duties and tasks of AGEPI in the field of copyright and related rights were detailed and explained in the Article 4. The law was developed by AGEPI in 2008 with the help of the European Union (EU). This made the new law compatible with the most important international treaties on copyright, such as the Berne Convention, the Rome Convention of 1961, the TRIPS Agreement, the WIPO Copyright Treaty and the WIPO Performances and Phonograms Treaty, as well as with many EU directives.

== Modern legislation ==
=== Copyright registration ===
According to Article 5 of the 2010 copyright law, copyright registration is not required to protect intellectual property in Moldova. Furthermore, according to Article 9, the author has the initial right to copyright protection for his or her work by virtue of the fact of its creation. For the apparition and application of copyright, registration of the work, any special design of the work or compliance with any formalities are not required. Registration is important evidence in case of litigation, in which case it can be recognized by a court as a presumption of authorship unless proven otherwise.

=== Objects and works subjected to copyright and related rights ===
According to Article 7, in Moldova, copyright applies automatically to literary, artistic and scientific works, regardless of the purpose of their creation and their value. These works include:

- Literary works (manuscripts, musical notations, typewriters, etc.);
- Oral works (public performances, etc.);
- Sound or video recordings (digital, magnetic, mechanical, optical, etc.);
- Visual works (drawings, paintings, picture frames, plans, sketches, etc.);
- Tridimensional works (architectural structures, models, scale models, sculptures, etc.);
- Other forms of works.

On the other hand, those objects with copyright, according to Article 7 as well, are:

- Literary works (novels, novellas, short stories, verses, etc.);
- Computer programs protected as literary works;
- Scientific works;
- Dramatic and musical-dramatic works, librettos, movie synopses, screenplays and screenplay plans;
- Musical works with or without any text;
- Choreographies and mimic art;
- Audiovisual works;
- Graphic, painting, sculpting and other artistic works;
- Urban planning, garden design and architectural works;
- Works of applied arts;
- Photographic and other works obtained through photography;
- Maps, plans, plastic artistic works and sketches related to architecture, geology, topography and other fields of science;
- Databases;
- Other works.

Moldovan law states that official documents of an administrative, normative or political nature (laws, judicial decisions, etc.) as well as their official translations, symbols and state signs (banknotes, coats of arms, flags, honorary orders, etc.), expressions of folklore and messages about the news of the day and various other events have the character of "simple information".

Subjects of related rights are performers, producers of phonograms and video recordings and broadcasting or cable broadcasting organizations. Related rights are exercised without prejudice to copyright. Compliance with any formality is not required for the apparition and application of related rights. In the absence of proof to show the contrary, a natural or legal person is considered to be that whose name or work's title is indicated in the usual way in the recording of a performance, phonogram, video recording and in the recording of the program. In these cases, the related rights holders are the performer, the producer of the phonogram or video recording and the broadcaster, respectively.

== See also ==
- Copyright law of Romania
- Copyright law of Transnistria
- List of parties to international copyright agreements
