= Cozancea =

- Location within Romania

Location
- Country: Romania
- Counties: Botoșani County

Physical characteristics
- Mouth: Sitna
  - coordinates: 47.6048°N 27.0867°E
- Length: 24 km (15 mi)
- Basin size: 70 km^{2} (27 sq mi)
- Discharge
  - location: *
  - minimum: 0 m^{3}/s (0 cu ft/s)
  - maximum: 22.20 m^{3}/s (784 cu ft/s)

Basin features
- Progression: Sitna→ Jijia→ Prut→ Danube→ Black Sea
- Tributaries
  - right: Zlătunoaia
- River code: XIII.1.15.18.10

The Cozancea is a left tributary of the river Sitna in Romania. It flows into the Sitna in Cernești. Its length is 24 km (15 mi) and its basin size is 70 km^{2} (27 sq mi).
