= Hănești =

- Commune
- Coat of arms

- Location in Botoșani County

- Location in Romania
- Coordinates: 47°55′N 26°59′E
- Country: Romania
- County: Botoșani
- Subdivisions: Hănești, Borolea, Moara Jorii, Sărata-Basarab, Slobozia Hănești

Government
  - Mayor (2024–2028): Costel Matei (PSD)
- Area: 59.81 km^{2} (23.09 sq mi)
- Population (2021-12-01): 2,562
  - Density: 42.84/km^{2} (110.9/sq mi)
- Time zone: UTC+02:00 (EET)
  - Summer (DST): UTC+03:00 (EEST)
- Postal code: 717195
- Area code: (+40) x31
- Vehicle reg.: BT
- Website: www.comunahanesti.ro

Hănești is a commune in Botoșani County, Western Moldavia, Romania. It is composed of five villages: Borolea, Hănești, Moara Jorii, Sărata-Basarab and Slobozia Hănești. The population is 2844 people, and the commune has an area of 6052 ha. The commune has three primary schools and five secondary schools.

== History ==
The first recorded usage of the name Hănești appears in a document by military leader Petru Rareș dated April 11, 1546.

== Geography ==
The Bașeu River runs through Hănești Commune, discharging into the Prut near Ștefănești, Botoșani.

A man-made lake known as "Lake Hănești" ("iazul Hănești" in Romanian), used for pisciculture, was created on the Bașeu River using land between Hănești Commune and Vlăsinești Commune at 47°55′24″N 26°58′19″E.

== Demographics ==
Historical population
| Year | Pop. | ±% |
|---|---|---|
| 2002 | 2,348 | — |
| 2011 | 2,176 | −7.3% |
| 2021 | 2,562 | +17.7% |
Source: Census data

At the 2021 census Hănești had a population of 2,562; of those, (67.56%) were Romanians, (25.14%) Ukrainians, and (7,3%) unknown.

At the 2011 census, the commune had 2,176 inhabitants, of which (96.73%) were Romanians, (0.04%) others, and (3,21%) unknown.

== Natives ==
- Teofil Vâlcu (1931-1993), actor
- Constantin Cojocaru (1945-2024), actor
