= Sulița =

- Commune
- Location in Botoșani County

- Location in Romania
- Coordinates: 47°39′N 26°55′E
- Country: Romania
- County: Botoșani
- Subdivisions: Sulița, Cheliș, Dracșani

Government
  - Mayor (2024–2028): George Popescu (ADU)
- Area: 65.61 km^{2} (25.33 sq mi)
- Elevation: 100 m (300 ft)
- Population (2021-12-01): 2,645
  - Density: 40/km^{2} (100/sq mi)
- Time zone: EET/EEST (UTC+2/+3)
- Postal code: 717370
- Area code: +40 x31
- Vehicle reg.: BT
- Website: primariasulita.ro

Sulița is a commune in Botoșani County, Western Moldavia, Romania. It is composed of three villages: Cheliș, Dracșani, and Sulița.

The commune is situated in the Jijia Plain, at an altitude of 100 m (330 ft), on the banks of the river Sitna and its left tributary, the river Burla. It is located in the southern part of the county, 26 km (16 mi) southwest of the county seat, Botoșani.

== Natives ==
- Cleopa Ilie (1912 – 1998), abbot of the Sihăstria Monastery
