= Bodeasa (river) =

River in Romania

- Location within Romania

Location
- Country: Romania
- Counties: Botoșani County
- Villages: Sarata-Drăgușeni, Ichimeni, Bodeasa

Physical characteristics
- Mouth: Bașeu
  - coordinates: 47.9342°N 26.9472°E
- Length: 28 km (17 mi)
- Basin size: 100 km^{2} (39 sq mi)
- Discharge
  - location: *
  - minimum: 0.002 m^{3}/s (0.071 cu ft/s)
  - maximum: 81.2 m^{3}/s (2,870 cu ft/s)

Basin features
- Progression: Bașeu→ Prut→ Danube→ Black Sea

The Bodeasa is a left tributary of the river Bașeu in Romania. It discharges into the Bașeu in Miron Costin. Its length is 28 km (17 mi) and its basin size is 100 km^{2} (39 sq mi).
