= Podriga =

- Location within Romania

Location
- Country: Romania
- Counties: Botoșani County
- Villages: Drăgușeni

Physical characteristics
- Mouth: Bașeu
  - coordinates: 47.9619°N 26.8468°E
- Length: 40 km (25 mi)
- Basin size: 234 km^{2} (90 sq mi)
- Discharge
  - location: *
  - minimum: 0.015 m^{3}/s (0.53 cu ft/s)
  - maximum: 190 m^{3}/s (6,700 cu ft/s)

Basin features
- Progression: Bașeu→ Prut→ Danube→ Black Sea
- Tributaries
  - left: Lesmânița, Valea Boului
  - right: Izvoarele

The Podriga is a left tributary of the river Bașeu in Romania. It discharges into the Bașeu in Săveni. Its length is 40 km (25 mi) and its basin size is 234 km^{2} (90 sq mi).
