= Urechioiu =

- Location within Romania

Location
- Country: Romania
- Counties: Botoșani County
- Villages: Brăești

Physical characteristics
- Mouth: Sitna
  - coordinates: 47.8105°N 26.5743°E
- Length: 16 km (9.9 mi)
- Basin size: 40 km^{2} (15 sq mi)
- Discharge
  - location: *
  - minimum: 0.002 m^{3}/s (0.071 cu ft/s)
  - maximum: 12.70 m^{3}/s (448 cu ft/s)

Basin features
- Progression: Sitna→ Jijia→ Prut→ Danube→ Black Sea
- Tributaries
  - right: Burduja
- River code: XIII.1.15.18.3

The Urechioiu is a left tributary of the river Sitna in Romania. It flows into the Sitna near Cervicești-Deal. Its length is 16 km (9.9 mi) and its basin size is 40 km^{2} (15 sq mi).
