= Bălușeni =

- Commune
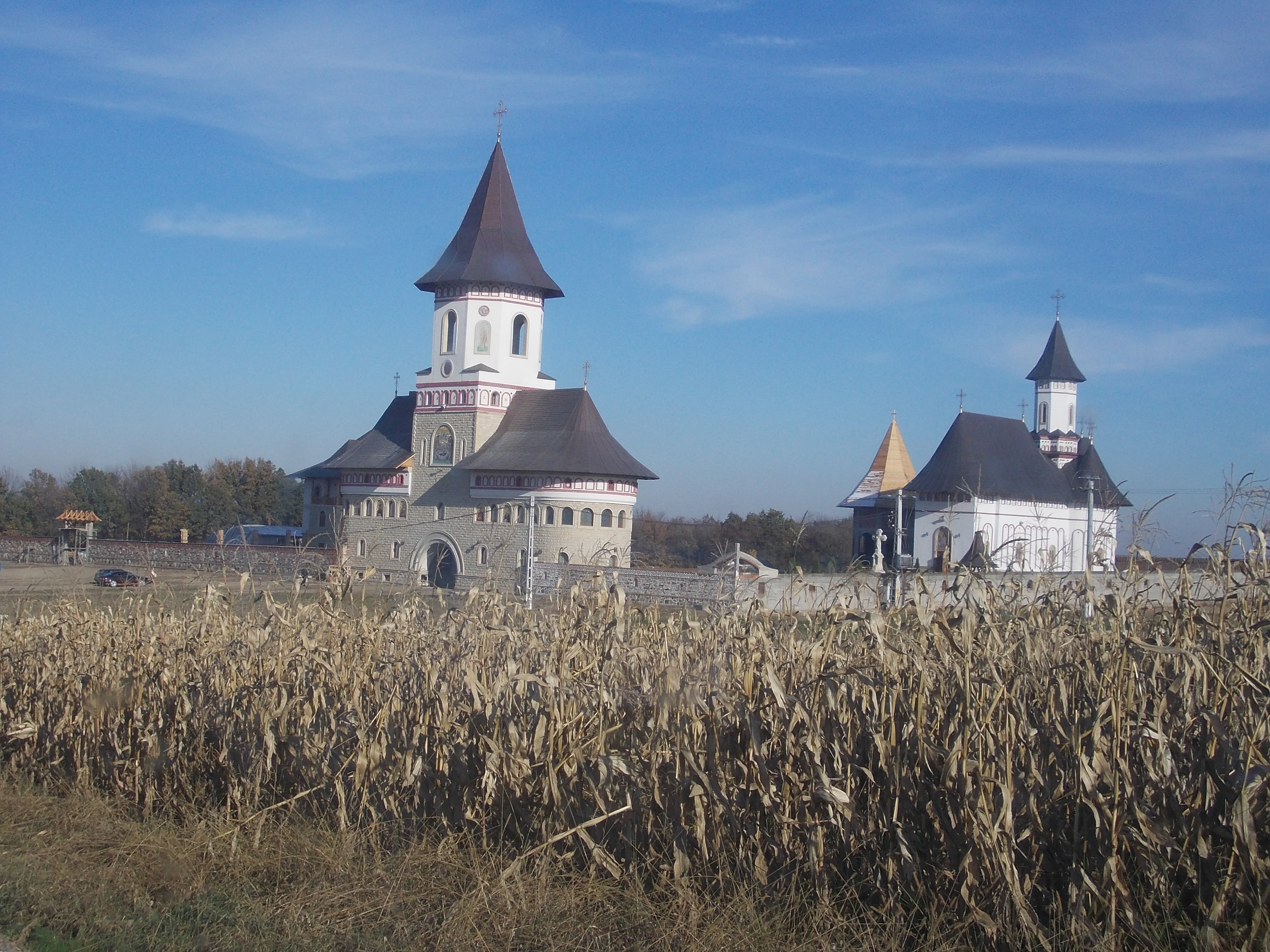
- Zosin Monastery in Bălușeni

- Location in Botoșani County

- Location in Romania
- Coordinates: 47°40′N 26°48′E
- Country: Romania
- County: Botoșani

Government
  - Mayor (2024–2028): Gheorghe Claudiu Doroftei (PSD)
- Area: 73.1 km^{2} (28.2 sq mi)
- Elevation: 130 m (430 ft)
- Population (2021-12-01): 4,441
  - Density: 60.8/km^{2} (157/sq mi)
- Time zone: UTC+02:00 (EET)
  - Summer (DST): UTC+03:00 (EEST)
- Postal code: 717025
- Vehicle reg.: BT
- Website: www.primariabaluseni.ro

Bălușeni is a commune in Botoșani County, Western Moldavia, Romania. It is composed of six villages: Bălușeni, Bălușenii Noi, Buzeni, Coșuleni, Draxini and Zăicești.
