= Havârna =

Commune in Botoșani County, Romania

- Commune
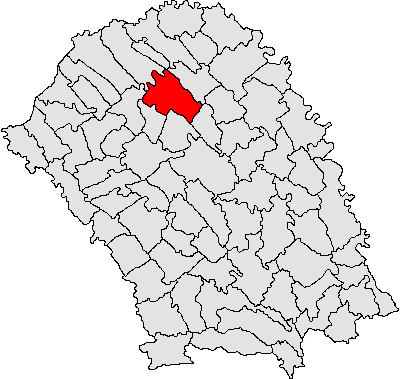
- Location in Botoșani County

- Location in Romania
- Coordinates: 48°04′N 26°39′E
- Country: Romania
- County: Botoșani
- Subdivisions: Havârna, Balinți, Galbeni, Gârbeni, Niculcea, Tătărășeni

Government
  - Mayor (2024–2028): Rodica Baltă (PSD)
- Area: 95.65 km^{2} (36.93 sq mi)
- Population (2021-12-01): 4,193
  - Density: 43.84/km^{2} (113.5/sq mi)
- Time zone: UTC+02:00 (EET)
  - Summer (DST): UTC+03:00 (EEST)
- Postal code: 717185
- Area code: +40 x31
- Vehicle reg.: BT

Havârna is a commune in Botoșani County, Western Moldavia, Romania. It is composed of six villages: Balinți, Galbeni, Gârbeni, Havârna, Niculcea and Tătărășeni.
