= Leorda =

- Commune
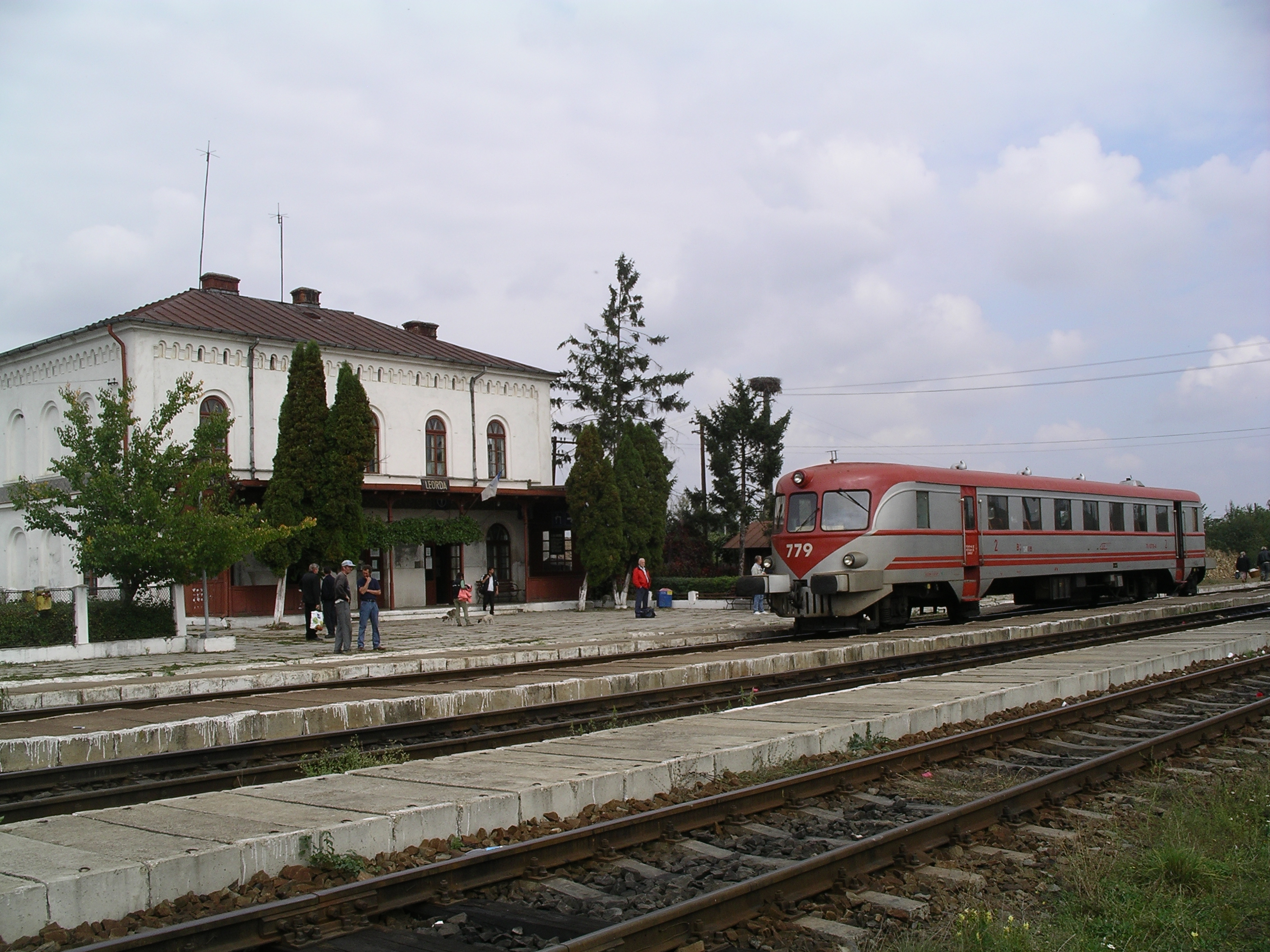

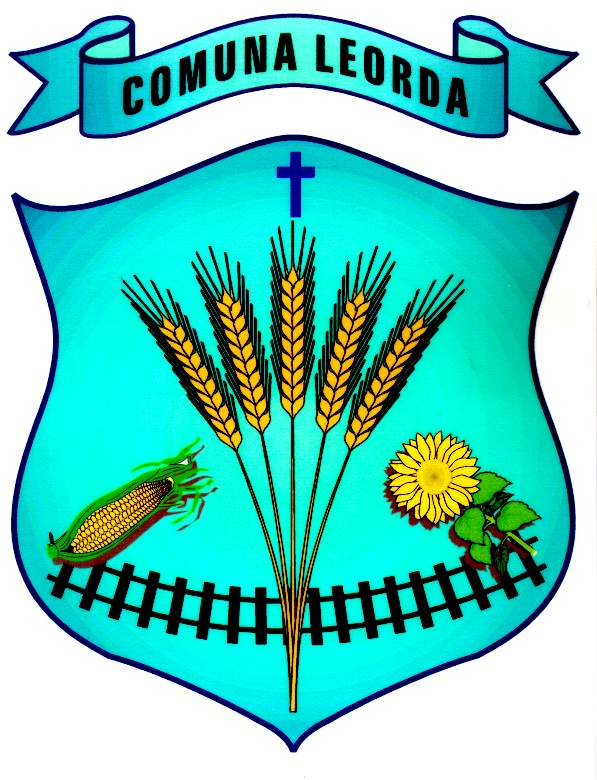
- Coat of arms

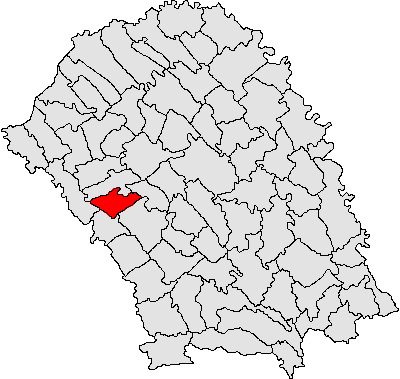
- Location in Botoșani County

- Location in Romania
- Coordinates: 47°49′N 26°28′E
- Country: Romania
- County: Botoșani
- Subdivisions: Leorda, Belcea, Costinești, Dolina, Mitoc

Government
  - Mayor (2024–2028): Ștefan Dulgheru (PSD)
- Area: 41.68 km^{2} (16.09 sq mi)
- Population (2021-12-01): 2,236
  - Density: 53.65/km^{2} (138.9/sq mi)
- Time zone: UTC+02:00 (EET)
  - Summer (DST): UTC+03:00 (EEST)
- Postal code: 717220
- Area code: +40 x31
- Vehicle reg.: BT

Leorda is a commune in Botoșani County, Western Moldavia, Romania. It is composed of five villages: Belcea, Costinești, Dolina, Leorda and Mitoc.

== Natives ==
- Wojciech Weiss
