= Copyright law of Romania =

Law of Copyright in Romania

In Romania, copyright law (drept de autor) is defined by the Law No. 8/1996 on authors rights and related rights, as republished in 2018, which currently implements European copyright law (directives). Copyright is acquired irrespective of formalities, and normally belongs to the natural person/s who created the protected work. A protected work is created if the work is the author's own intellectual creation. Like other EU civil law jurisdictions, Romanian copyright law recognises two types of rights: moral rights and patrimonial rights.

== Moral rights ==
1. the right to decide if, how and when a work is brought to public knowledge;
2. the right to claim recognition as author of the work;
3. the right to decide the name under which the work is brought to public knowledge;
4. the right to claim the observance of the integrity of the work and to oppose any change or other interference with the work that damages the author's honor or reputation; and
5. the right to withdraw the work.

These rights cannot be waived or transferred. After the author's death, the rights under (1), (2) and (4) above are exercised by heirs, for an unlimited period of time.

== Patrimonial rights ==
1. reproduce and distribute the work;
2. import in order to commercialise on the internal market copies of the work made with the author's consent;
3. lease or lend the work;
4. communicate it to the public, directly or indirectly, including by making it available for the public to have access to at any time and in any place; and
5. broadcast the work, transmit it by cable or create derivative works thereof.

In addition, the author of a graphic, plastic art or photographic work has a resale right, which entitles him or her to receive a percentage of the price when the work makes the object of a reselling operation in which an art dealer participates as seller, buyer or agent.

== Author ==
According to chapter 2 (Subjects of copyright) of the Law No. 8/1996 on authors rights and related rights, the Author is the natural person or persons who created the work. It is presumed to be the author the person under whose name the work was first brought to public knowledge. When the work has been made public in anonymous form or under a pseudonym that does not allow the identification of the author, the copyright shall be exercised by the natural or legal person making it public with the consent of the author, as long as he does not disclose his identity. The copyright of the joint work belongs to its co-authors, one of which may be the principal author, under the terms of this law.

== Works protected by copyright ==
According to chapter III (Object of copyright) of the Law No. 8/1996 on authors rights and related rights, any original works (creation of human mind) in the literary, artistic or scientific fields, whatever the mode of creation, mode or form of expression, and regardless of their value and purpose, are protected by copyright.

The article 7 of the Law No. 8/1996 on authors rights and related rights provides a non-exhaustive list of works protected by copyright, such as:

1. literary and publicist writings, conferences, sermons, pleadings, lectures and any other written or oral works, as well as computer programs;
2. scientific, written or oral works such as communications, studies, university courses, school textbooks, scientific projects and documentation;
3. musical compositions with or without text; d) dramatic, dramatic and musical works, choreographic works and pantomime;
4. cinematographic works, as well as any other audiovisual works;
5. photographic works, as well as any other works expressed by an analogue process of photography;
6. works of graphic or plastic art, such as sculpture, painting, engraving, lithography, monumental art, scenography, tapestry, ceramics, glass and metal, drawings, designs and other works of art intended for practical use;
7. architectural works, including drawings, layouts and graphic works that make up architectural projects;
8. plastic works, maps and drawings in the field of topography, geography and science in general.

== Copyright formalities ==
In Romania, there is no requirement for a copyright notice in order to obtain copyright protection, as original works are automatically protected by copyright as of their creation. However, the author and other copyright holders are entitled to place on their works a copyright notice consisting of the letter C in a circle together with their name, and the place and year of the first publication. In cases where such a copyright notice is displayed, there is a presumption that the work is copyright protected in favour of the person using the copyright notice, until otherwise proven.

== Duration of copyright protection ==
Duration of copyright protection is defined by chapter V (Object of copyright) of the Law No. 8/1996 on authors rights and related rights. The general rule is that the patrimonial rights of the author last for seventy (70) years after his or her death. If there are no heirs, the exercise of these rights rests with the collective management body mandated during the lifetime by the author or, in the absence of a mandate, by the collective management body with the largest number of members in the field of creation.

== Copyright infringement ==
Holders of copyright or related rights can file for infringement when there is:

- Unauthorised use of their works (by reproduction, distribution, loan, lease, communication to the public (including making available), importation, broadcasting, retransmission by cable networks or by making derivative works).
- Infringement of moral rights (first publication, attribution, right to choose name for publication, right to maintain integrity of the work, and right to retract the work).
- Infringement of the droit de suite (right to equitable remuneration).

== See also ==
- Copyright law of the European Union
- Copyright law of Moldova
- List of parties to international copyright agreements
