= Hudești =

- Commune
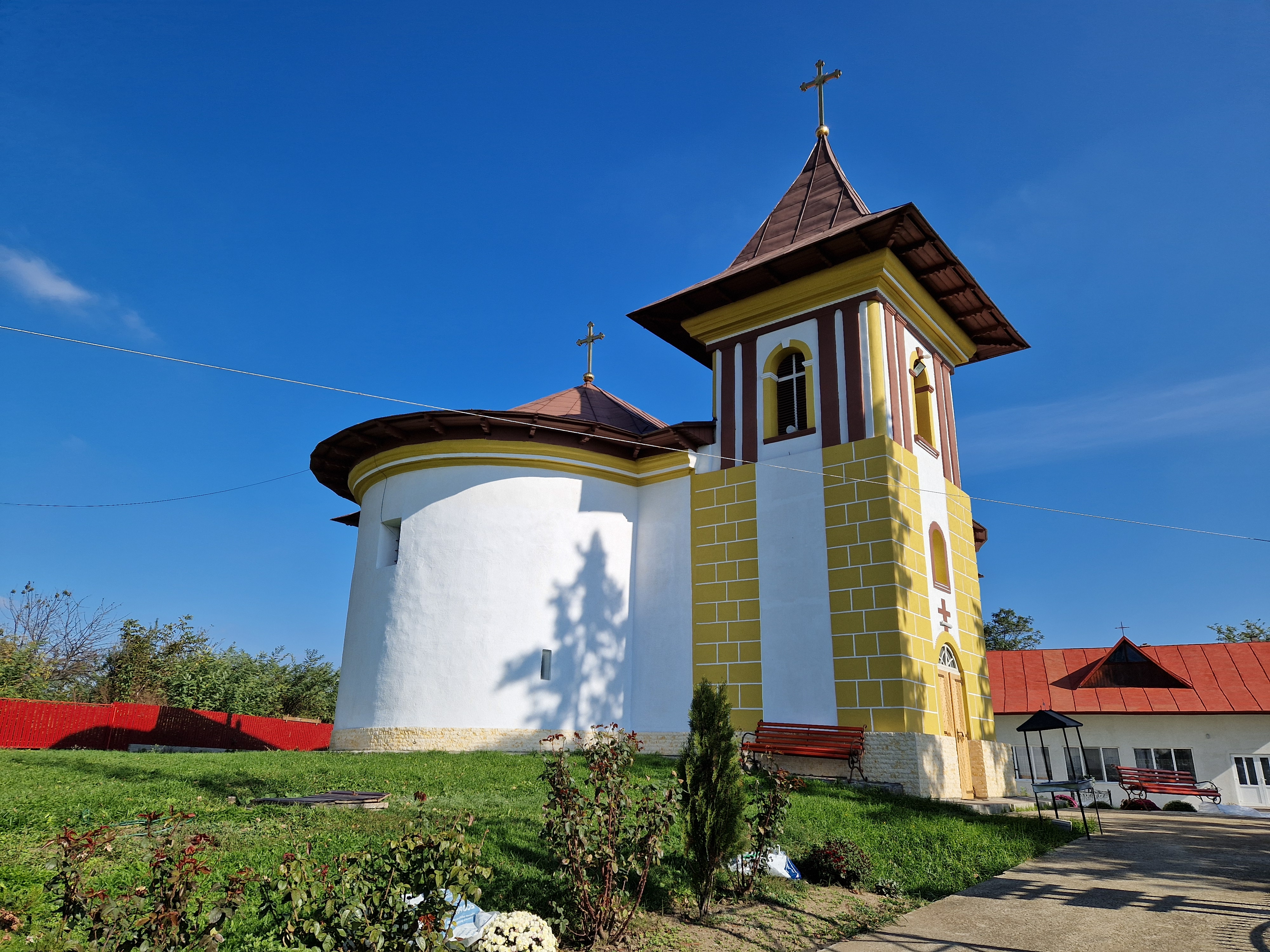

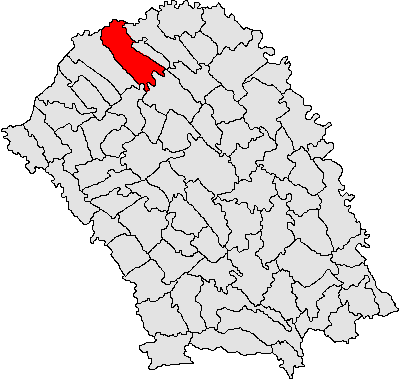
- Location in Botoșani County

- Location in Romania
- Coordinates: 48°09′N 26°30′E
- Country: Romania
- County: Botoșani
- Subdivisions: Hudești, Alba, Baranca, Bașeu, Mlenăuți, Vatra

Government
  - Mayor (2024–2028): Dimitre Cătălin Zlei (PNL)
- Area: 104.32 km^{2} (40.28 sq mi)
- Population (2021-12-01): 5,647
  - Density: 54.13/km^{2} (140.2/sq mi)
- Time zone: UTC+02:00 (EET)
  - Summer (DST): UTC+03:00 (EEST)
- Postal code: 717210
- Area code: +40 x31
- Vehicle reg.: BT

Hudești is a commune in Botoșani County, Western Moldavia, Romania. It is composed of six villages: Alba, Baranca, Bașeu, Hudești, Mlenăuți and Vatra.

== Natives ==
- Camelia Macoviciuc-Mihalcea
