= Ștefănești, Botoșani =

Ștefănești
- Town
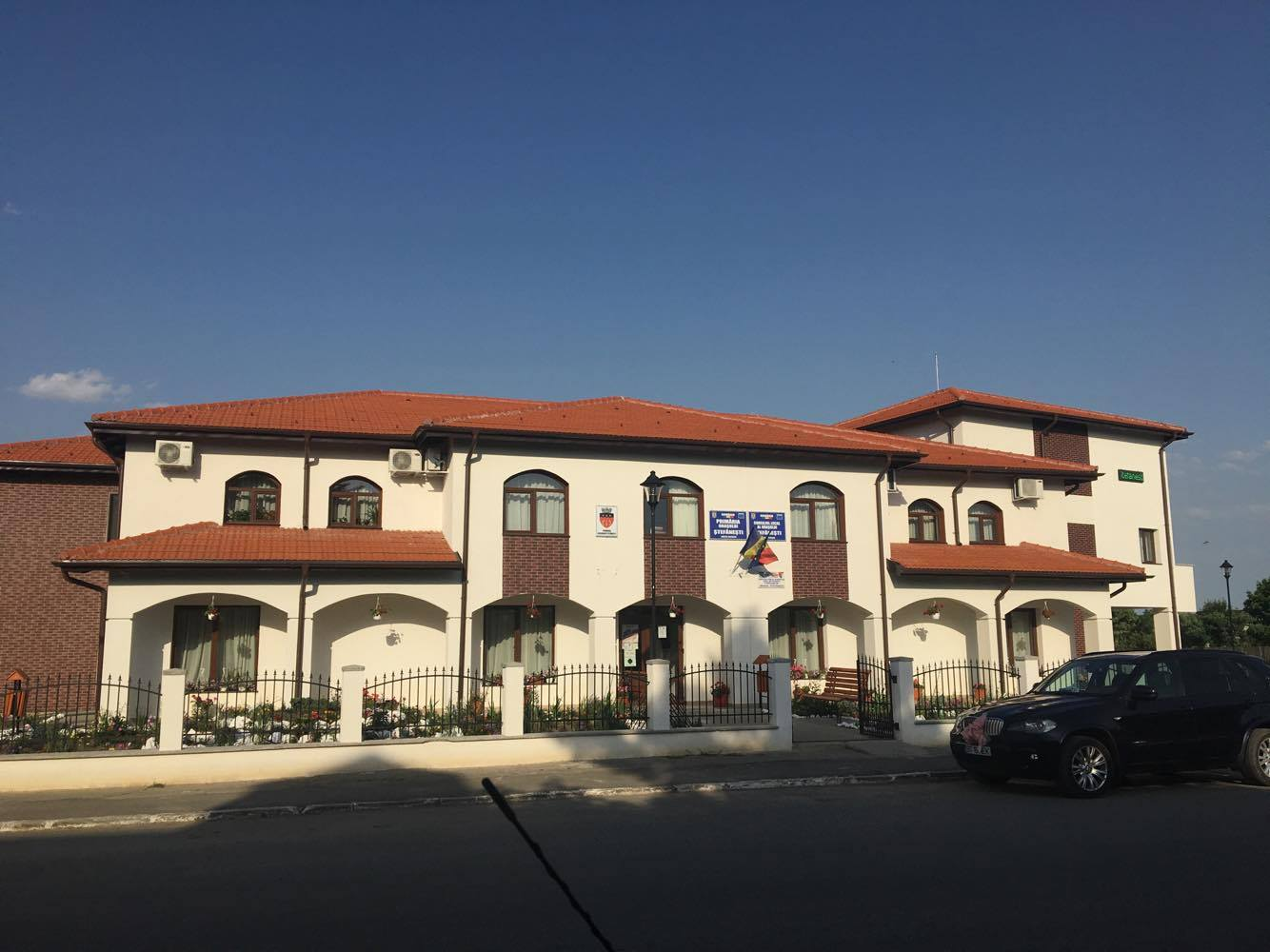
- Ștefănești Town Hall

- Coat of arms

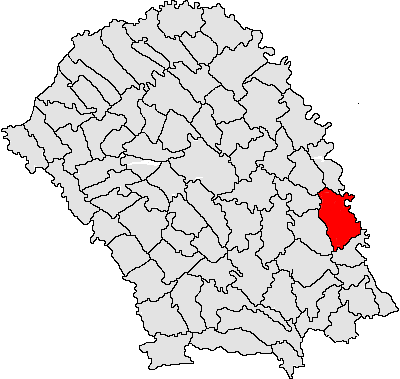
- Location in Botoșani County

- Location in Romania
- Coordinates: 47°47′29″N 27°11′57″E
- Country: Romania
- County: Botoșani

Government
  - Mayor (2024–2028): Florin Buțura (PNL)
- Area: 96.58 km^{2} (37.29 sq mi)
- Elevation: 67 m (220 ft)
- Population (2021-12-01): 5,032
  - Density: 52.10/km^{2} (134.9/sq mi)
- Time zone: UTC+02:00 (EET)
  - Summer (DST): UTC+03:00 (EEST)
- Postal code: 717385
- Area code: (+40) 02 31
- Vehicle reg.: BT
- Website: orasulstefanesti-bt.ro

Ștefănești (Yiddish: שטעפנשט, Hebrew: שטפנשט) is a small town in Botoșani County, Western Moldavia, Romania. It administers four nearby villages: Bădiuți, Bobulești, Stânca and Ștefănești-Sat.

The town is located near the point where the Bașeu River discharges into the Prut River, on the shore of the Stânca-Costești reservoir. Stânca is a border checkpoint with Moldova, connected via the Stânca-Costești Dam to the town of Costești, Moldova.

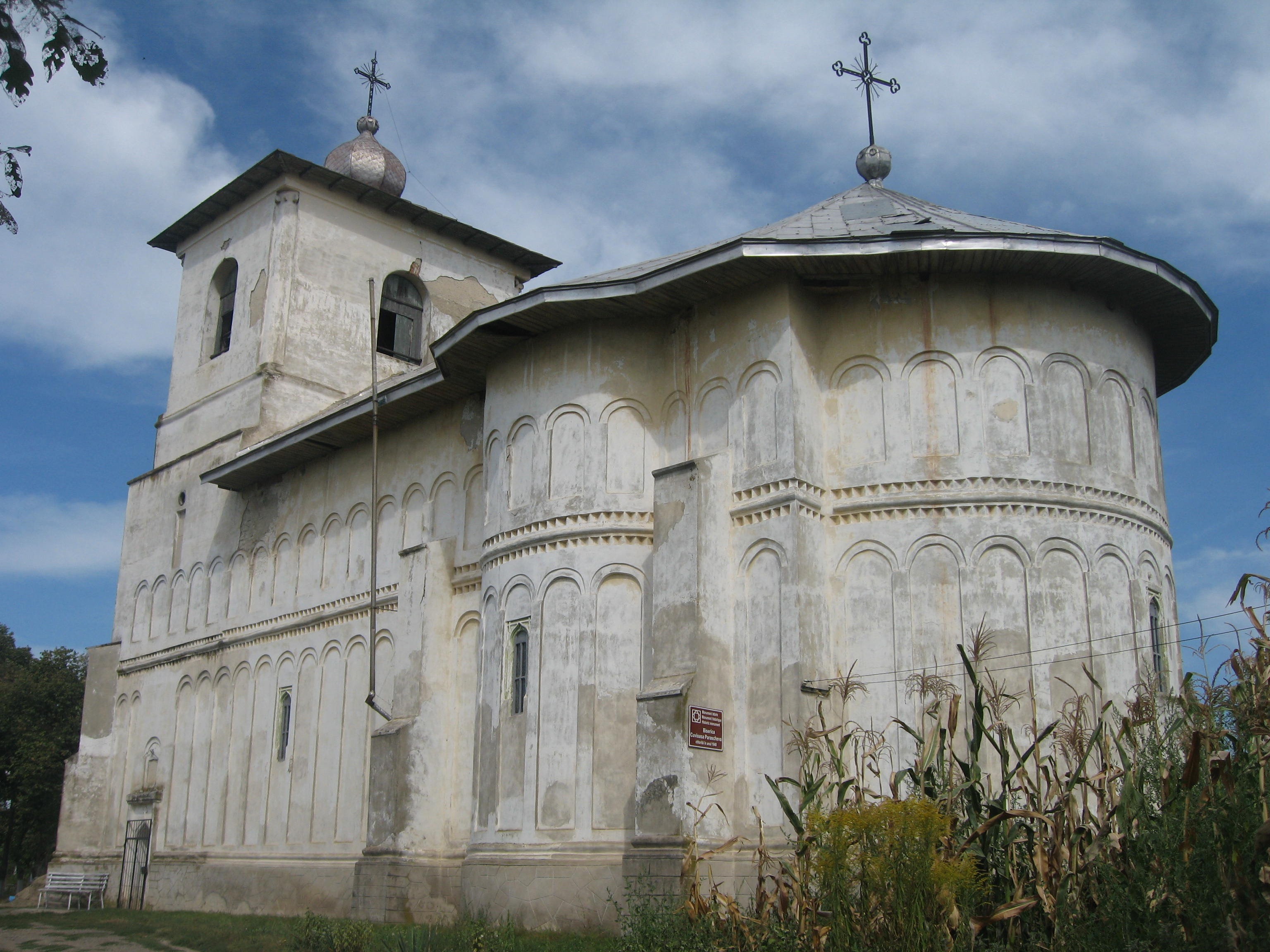
Saint Parascheva Church

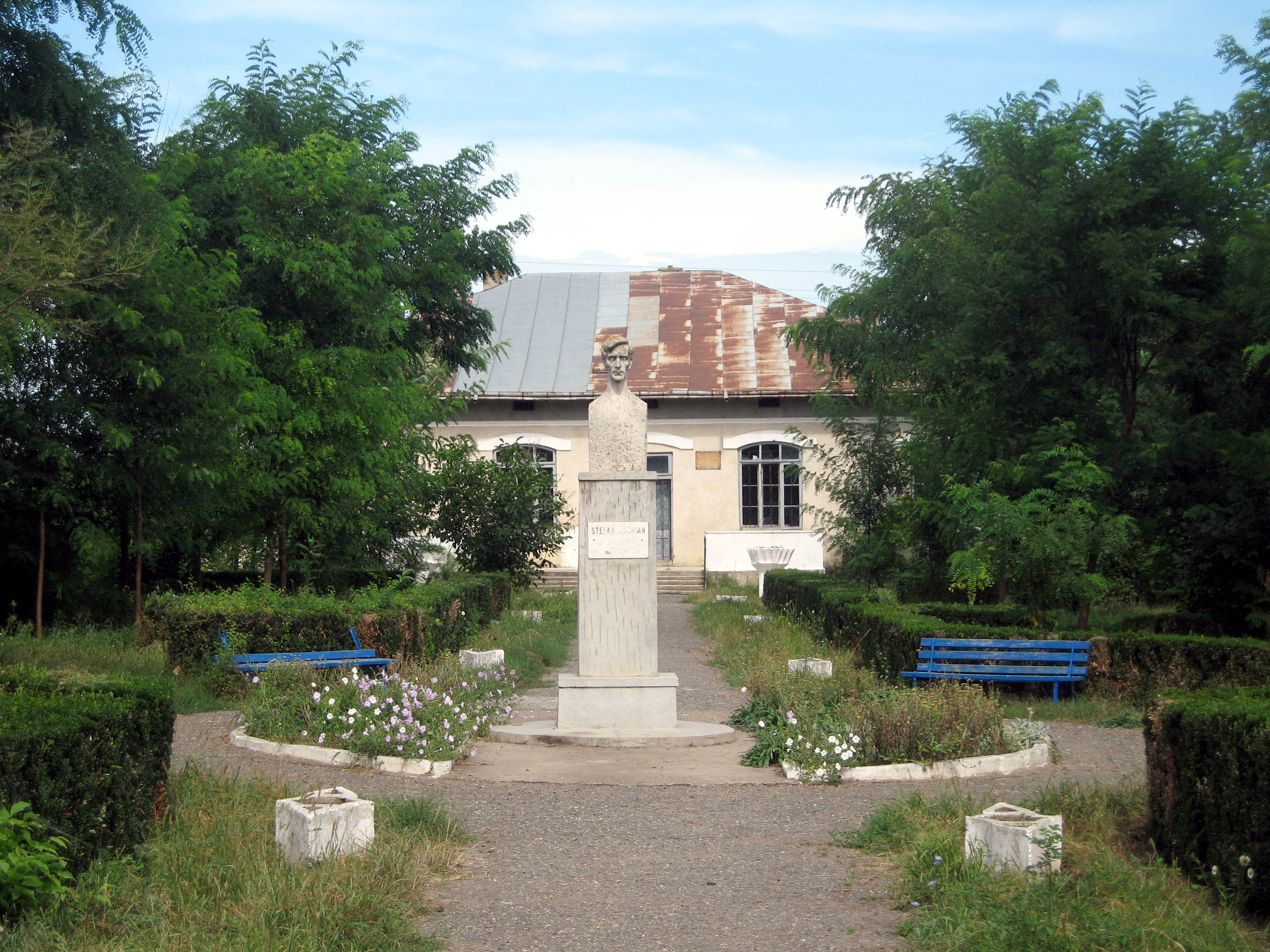
The Ștefan Luchian Museum

== Demographics ==
According to the 2021 census, Ștefănești has a population of 5,032. At the census from 2011, the town had a population of 5,092; of those, 90.57% were ethnic Romanians and 9.3% ethnic Romani.

== Natives ==
The painter Ștefan Luchian (1868–1916) was born here, as well as Vlad Onicescu, the father of the mathematician Octav Onicescu (1892–1983). The town is also the birthplace of the Shtefanesht Hasidic dynasty and as such its name is still known in present-day Israel.

== Climate ==
Climate data for Ștefănești Stânca (altitude 110m, 2014-2026 normals, extremes 1981-present)
| Month | Jan | Feb | Mar | Apr | May | Jun | Jul | Aug | Sep | Oct | Nov | Dec | Year |
|---|---|---|---|---|---|---|---|---|---|---|---|---|---|
| Record high °C (°F) | 17.6 (63.7) | 20.2 (68.4) | 26.8 (80.2) | 29.6 (85.3) | 33.6 (92.5) | 37.8 (100.0) | 40.2 (104.4) | 40.0 (104.0) | 37.7 (99.9) | 31.2 (88.2) | 24.8 (76.6) | 16.6 (61.9) | 40.2 (104.4) |
| Mean daily maximum °C (°F) | 2.2 (36.0) | 4.7 (40.5) | 10.8 (51.4) | 16.8 (62.2) | 21.9 (71.4) | 27.1 (80.8) | 28.8 (83.8) | 29.2 (84.6) | 24.0 (75.2) | 16.1 (61.0) | 8.6 (47.5) | 4.0 (39.2) | 16.2 (61.1) |
| Daily mean °C (°F) | −0.7 (30.7) | 1.3 (34.3) | 6.0 (42.8) | 11.3 (52.3) | 16.3 (61.3) | 21.5 (70.7) | 23.1 (73.6) | 23.1 (73.6) | 18.5 (65.3) | 11.4 (52.5) | 5.6 (42.1) | 1.5 (34.7) | 11.6 (52.8) |
| Mean daily minimum °C (°F) | −3.7 (25.3) | −2.1 (28.2) | 1.2 (34.2) | 5.7 (42.3) | 10.8 (51.4) | 16.0 (60.8) | 17.4 (63.3) | 17.0 (62.6) | 13.0 (55.4) | 6.8 (44.2) | 2.6 (36.7) | −0.9 (30.4) | 7.0 (44.6) |
| Record low °C (°F) | −27.0 (−16.6) | −23.8 (−10.8) | −20.1 (−4.2) | −4.9 (23.2) | 0.8 (33.4) | 6.5 (43.7) | 9.2 (48.6) | 6.9 (44.4) | 1.2 (34.2) | −8.4 (16.9) | −18.8 (−1.8) | −24.7 (−12.5) | −27.0 (−16.6) |
| Average precipitation mm (inches) | 7.6 (0.30) | 13.7 (0.54) | 24.1 (0.95) | 28.3 (1.11) | 53.4 (2.10) | 73.1 (2.88) | 55.8 (2.20) | 34.6 (1.36) | 42.4 (1.67) | 39.9 (1.57) | 27.1 (1.07) | 11.9 (0.47) | 411.9 (16.22) |
| Average precipitation days (≥ 1.0 mm) | 2.3 | 3.4 | 4.2 | 5.4 | 7.0 | 7.6 | 6.8 | 4.2 | 5.6 | 5.4 | 4.2 | 2.8 | 58.9 |
| Average snowy days | 9.9 | 6.2 | 2.2 | 1.0 | 0 | 0 | 0 | 0 | 0 | 0 | 1.5 | 6.3 | 27.1 |
Source 1: Meteomanz (2014-2026)
Source 2: Revistă geografică 2001
