= Mihălășeni, Botoșani =

Mihălășeni
- Commune
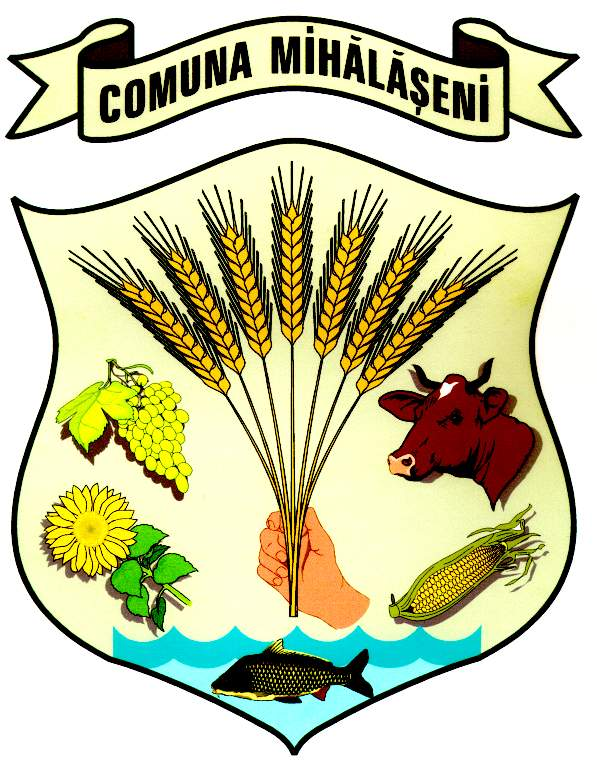
- Coat of arms

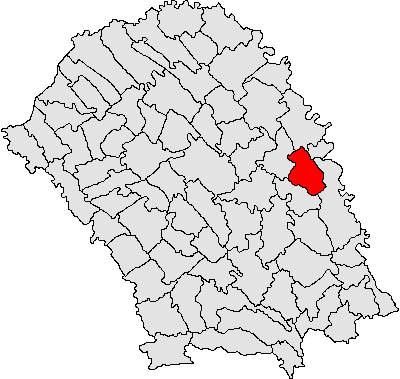
- Location in Botoșani County

- Location in Romania
- Coordinates: 47°53′N 27°04′E
- Country: Romania
- County: Botoșani
- Subdivisions: Mihălășeni, Caraiman, Năstase, Negrești, Păun, Sărata, Slobozia Silișcani

Government
  - Mayor (2024–2028): Claudiu Daniel Chelariu (PSD)
- Area: 63.28 km^{2} (24.43 sq mi)
- Population (2021-12-01): 2,123
  - Density: 33.55/km^{2} (86.89/sq mi)
- Time zone: UTC+02:00 (EET)
  - Summer (DST): UTC+03:00 (EEST)
- Postal code: 717270
- Area code: +40 x31
- Vehicle reg.: BT
- Website: mihalaseni.ro

Mihălășeni is a commune in Botoșani County, Western Moldavia, Romania. It is composed of seven villages: Caraiman, Mihălășeni, Năstase, Negrești, Păun, Sărata and Slobozia Silișcani.
