= Hlipiceni =

- Commune
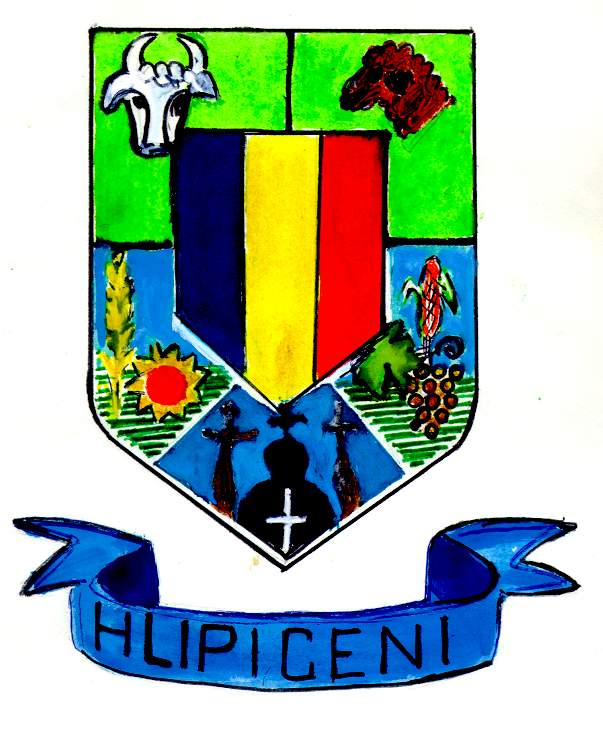
- Coat of arms

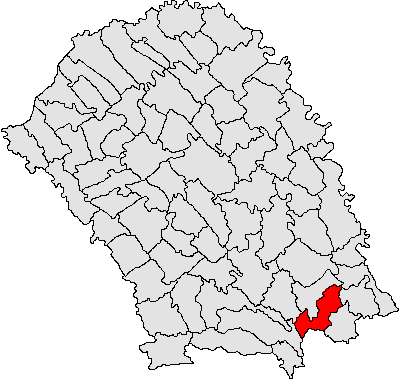
- Location in Botoșani County

- Location in Romania
- Coordinates: 47°36′N 27°09′E
- Country: Romania
- County: Botoșani
- Subdivisions: Hlipiceni, Dragalina, Victoria

Government
  - Mayor (2024–2028): Gheorghe Marian Luchian (PSD)
- Area: 73.8 km^{2} (28.5 sq mi)
- Elevation: 80 m (260 ft)
- Population (2021-12-01): 3,016
  - Density: 40.9/km^{2} (106/sq mi)
- Time zone: UTC+02:00 (EET)
  - Summer (DST): UTC+03:00 (EEST)
- Postal code: 717205
- Area code: +40 x31
- Vehicle reg.: BT

Hlipiceni is a commune in Botoșani County, Western Moldavia, Romania. It is composed of three villages: Dragalina, Hlipiceni and Victoria.
