= Sitna =

- Location within Romania

Location
- Country: Romania
- Counties: Botoșani County
- Cities: Botoșani

Physical characteristics
- Mouth: Jijia
  - location: Hlipiceni
  - coordinates: 47.6025°N 27.1522°E
- Length: 78 km (48 mi)
- Basin size: 943 km^{2} (364 sq mi)
- Discharge
  - location: Todireni*
  - average: 2.16 m^{3}/s (76 cu ft/s)
  - minimum: 0 m^{3}/s (0 cu ft/s)
  - maximum: 300 m^{3}/s (11,000 cu ft/s)

Basin features
- Progression: Jijia→ Prut→ Danube→ Black Sea

The Sitna is a right tributary of the river Jijia in Romania. It discharges into the Jijia in Hlipiceni. Its length is 78 km (48 mi) and its basin size is 943 km^{2} (364 sq mi). The Sulița Dam is located on the river Sitna.

== Tributaries ==
The following rivers are tributaries to the river Sitna:

- Left: Curmătura, Dolina, Urechioiu, Morișca, Burla, Cozancea
- Right: Luizoaia, Dresleuca, Dolina, Gornet
