= Curtești =

- Commune
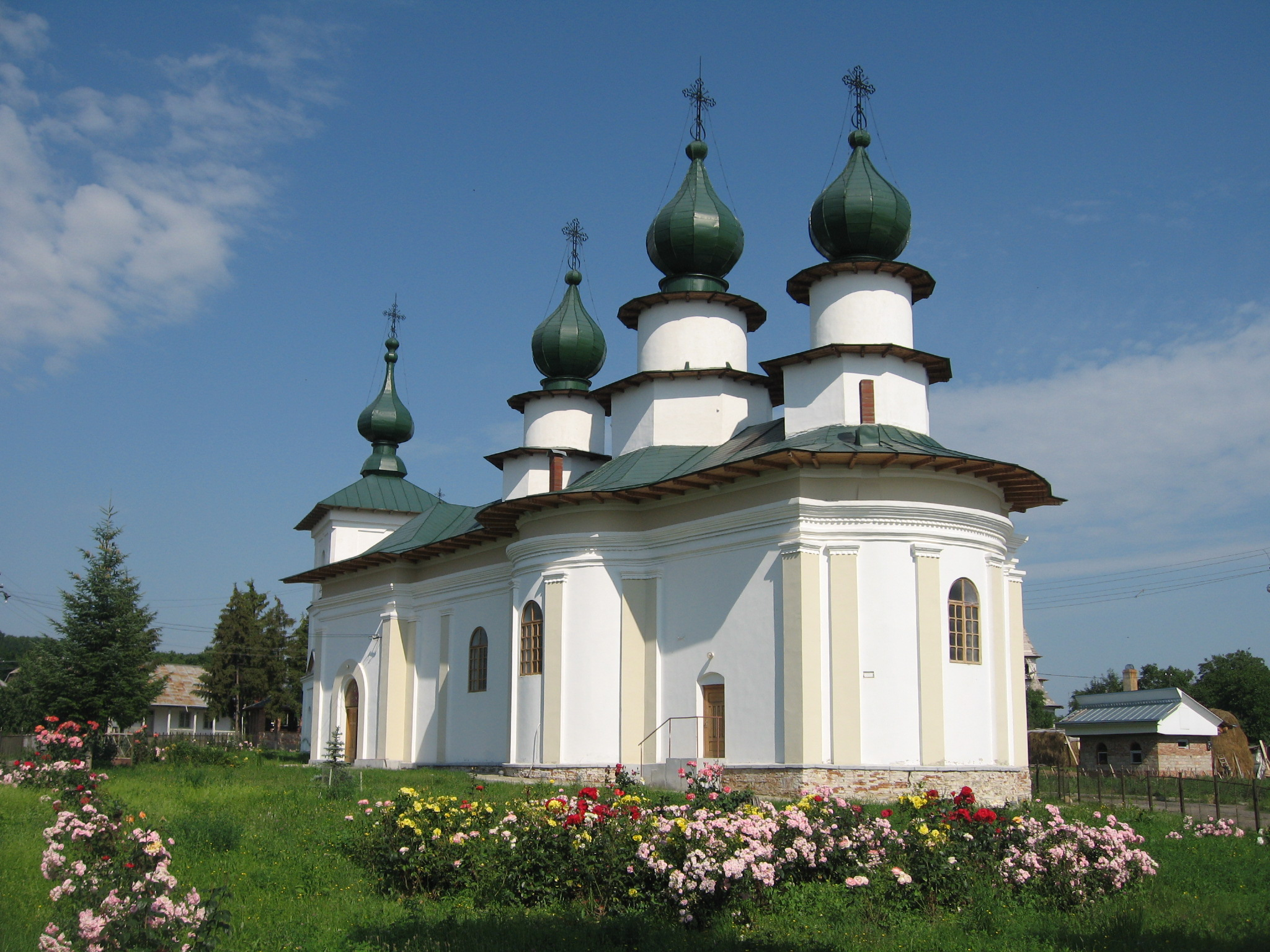

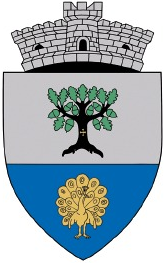
- Coat of arms

- Location in Botoșani County

- Location in Romania
- Coordinates: 47°43′N 26°39′E
- Country: Romania
- County: Botoșani
- Subdivisions: Curtești, Agafton, Băiceni, Hudum, Mănăstirea Doamnei, Orășeni-Deal, Orășeni-Vale

Government
  - Mayor (2024–2028): Maricel Anton (PSD)
- Area: 57.83 km^{2} (22.33 sq mi)
- Elevation: 140 m (460 ft)
- Population (2021-12-01): 6,133
  - Density: 106.1/km^{2} (274.7/sq mi)
- Time zone: UTC+02:00 (EET)
  - Summer (DST): UTC+03:00 (EEST)
- Postal code: 717110
- Area code: +40 x31
- Vehicle reg.: BT
- Website: primariacurtestibt.ro

Curtești is a commune in Botoșani County, Western Moldavia, Romania. It is composed of seven villages: Agafton, Băiceni, Curtești, Hudum, Mănăstirea Doamnei, Orășeni-Deal and Orășeni-Vale.

== Natives ==
- Nicolae Leon
