= Vlăsinești =

- Commune
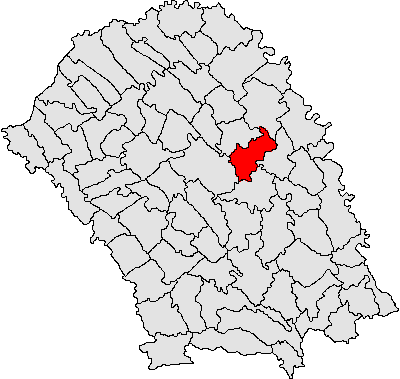
- Location in Botoșani County

- Location in Romania
- Coordinates: 47°56′N 26°53′E
- Country: Romania
- County: Botoșani
- Subdivisions: Vlăsinești, Miron Costin, Sârbi

Government
  - Mayor (2024–2028): Andrei Bouariu (PSD)
- Area: 67.61 km^{2} (26.10 sq mi)
- Elevation: 95 m (312 ft)
- Population (2021-12-01): 2,636
  - Density: 39/km^{2} (100/sq mi)
- Time zone: EET/EEST (UTC+2/+3)
- Postal code: 717465
- Area code: +40 x31
- Vehicle reg.: BT
- Website: comunavlasinesti.ro

Vlăsinești is a commune in Botoșani County, Western Moldavia, Romania. It is composed of three villages: Miron Costin, Sârbi, and Vlăsinești.

== Natives ==
- Dumitru Corbea (1910 – 2002), poet and prose writer
