= Roma, Botoșani =

Roma
- Commune
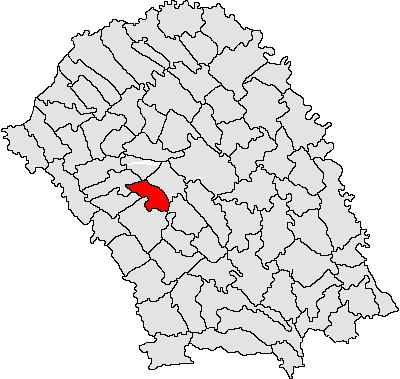
- Location in Botoșani County

- Location in Romania
- Coordinates: 47°50′N 26°36′E
- Country: Romania
- County: Botoșani
- Subdivisions: Roma, Cotârgaci

Government
  - Mayor (2024–2028): Cosmin Florin Cîșlariu (PSD)
- Area: 44.95 km^{2} (17.36 sq mi)
- Population (2021-12-01): 3,513
  - Density: 78.15/km^{2} (202.4/sq mi)
- Time zone: UTC+02:00 (EET)
  - Summer (DST): UTC+03:00 (EEST)
- Postal code: 717335
- Area code: +40 x31
- Vehicle reg.: BT
- Website: www.primariaromabt.ro

Roma is a commune in Botoșani County, Western Moldavia, Romania. It is composed of two villages: Cotârgaci and Roma.
