= Miletin =

- Location within Romania

Location
- Country: Romania
- Counties: Botoșani, Iași

Physical characteristics
- Mouth: Jijia
  - location: Vlădeni
  - coordinates: 47.3869°N 27.3480°E
- Length: 90 km (56 mi)
- Basin size: 675 km^{2} (261 sq mi)
- Discharge
  - location: *
  - minimum: 0.006 m^{3}/s (0.21 cu ft/s)
  - maximum: 220 m^{3}/s (7,800 cu ft/s)

Basin features
- Progression: Jijia→ Prut→ Danube→ Black Sea

The Miletin is a right tributary of the river Jijia in Romania. It discharges into the Jijia near Vlădeni. It flows through the villages Cristești, Coșula, Copălău, Chițoveni, Prăjeni, Miletin, Plugari, Șipote and Vlădeni. Its length is 90 km (56 mi) and its basin size is 675 km^{2} (261 sq mi).

== Tributaries ==
The following rivers are tributaries to the river Miletin (from source to mouth):

- Left: Pârâul Putred, Valea Rea, Pârâul lui Vasile, Recea
- Right: Chirui, Horoghiuca, Varnița, Scânteia, La Moara de Vânt
