= Iepureni (disambiguation) =

Iepureni may refer to several places in Romania:

- Iepureni, a river in Iași County
- Iepureni, a village in Andrieșeni Commune, Iași County
- Iepureni, a village in Movileni Commune, Iași County

and a village in Moldova:

- Iepureni, a village in Cania Commune, Cantemir district
