= Pârâul Întors =

- Location within Romania

Location
- Country: Romania
- Counties: Botoșani County
- Villages: Văculești, Saucenița

Physical characteristics
- Mouth: Buhai
  - coordinates: 47.9545°N 26.3753°E
- Length: 19 km (12 mi)
- Basin size: 81 km^{2} (31 sq mi)
- Discharge
  - location: *
  - minimum: 0 m^{3}/s (0 cu ft/s)
  - maximum: 13.0 m^{3}/s (460 cu ft/s)

Basin features
- Progression: Buhai→ Jijia→ Prut→ Danube→ Black Sea
- Tributaries
  - left: Dintevici, Cănăpiștea, Ghilea
- River code: XIII.1.15.3.2

The Pârâul Întors is a right tributary of the river Buhai in Romania. It flows into the Buhai near Dorohoi. Its length is 19 km (12 mi) and its basin size is 81 km^{2} (31 sq mi).
