= Sbanț =

- Location within Romania

Location
- Country: Romania
- Counties: Iași County
- Villages: Movileni, Larga-Jijia

Physical characteristics
- Mouth: Jijioara
  - coordinates: 47.3309°N 27.3925°E
- Length: 10 km (6.2 mi)
- Basin size: 43 km^{2} (17 sq mi)

Basin features
- Progression: Jijioara→ Jijia→ Prut→ Danube→ Black Sea
- River code: XIII.1.15.27.4

The Sbanț is a right tributary of the river Jijioara in Romania. It flows into the Jijioara in Larga-Jijia. Its length is 10 km (6.2 mi) and its basin size is 43 km^{2} (17 sq mi).
