= Comarna (river) =

- Location within Romania

Location
- Country: Romania
- Counties: Iași County
- Villages: Comarna

Physical characteristics
- Mouth: Jijia
  - coordinates: 47.0536°N 27.8497°E
- Length: 8 km (5.0 mi)
- Basin size: 24 km^{2} (9.3 sq mi)

Basin features
- Progression: Jijia→ Prut→ Danube→ Black Sea

The Comarna is a right tributary of the river Jijia in eastern Romania. It discharges into the Jijia near Costuleni. Its length is 8 km (5.0 mi) and its basin size is 24 km^{2} (9.3 sq mi).
