= Covasna (disambiguation) =

Covasna is a town in Covasna County, Transylvania, Romania.

Covasna may also refer to:

- Covasna County
- Covasna (Jijia), a tributary of the Jijia
- Covasna (Râul Negru), a tributary of the Râul Negru
- Covasna, a village in Costuleni, Iași, Romania

== See also ==
- Cobasna, a town in Moldova controlled by Transnistria
