= Cozia =

Cozia may refer to several places in Romania:

- Cozia Monastery, Vâlcea County
- Cozia Mountains, Vâlcea County
- Cozia National Park, Vâlcea County
- Cozia, a village in Cornereva Commune, Caraș-Severin County
- Cozia, a village in Cârjiți Commune, Hunedoara County
- Cozia, a village in Costuleni Commune, Iași County
- Cozia, a village in Pristol Commune, Mehedinți County
- Cozia (river), a tributary of the Bohotin in Iași County
