= Pârâul lui Vasile =

- Location within Romania

Location
- Country: Romania
- Counties: Botoșani, Iași

Physical characteristics
- Mouth: Miletin
  - coordinates: 47.4845°N 27.1141°E
- Length: 15 km (9.3 mi)
- Basin size: 36 km^{2} (14 sq mi)
- Discharge
  - location: *
  - minimum: 0 m^{3}/s (0 cu ft/s)
  - maximum: 9.40 m^{3}/s (332 cu ft/s)

Basin features
- Progression: Miletin→ Jijia→ Prut→ Danube→ Black Sea
- River code: XIII.1.15.25.8

The Pârâul lui Vasile is a left tributary of the river Miletin in Romania. It flows into the Miletin in Plugari. Its length is 15 km (9.3 mi) and its basin size is 36 km^{2} (14 sq mi).
