= Putreda (disambiguation) =

Putreda may refer to the following rivers in Romania:

- Putreda, a tributary of the Jijia in Botoșani County
- Putreda, a tributary of the Bistrița in Bistrița-Năsăud County
- Putreda, a tributary of the Râmnicul Sărat in Buzău County
