= Corlăteni =

Corlăteni may refer to:

- Corlăteni, a commune in Botoșani County, Romania
- Corlăteni, a commune in Rîșcani District, Moldova
