= Onuka (band) =

Ukrainian electro-folk band

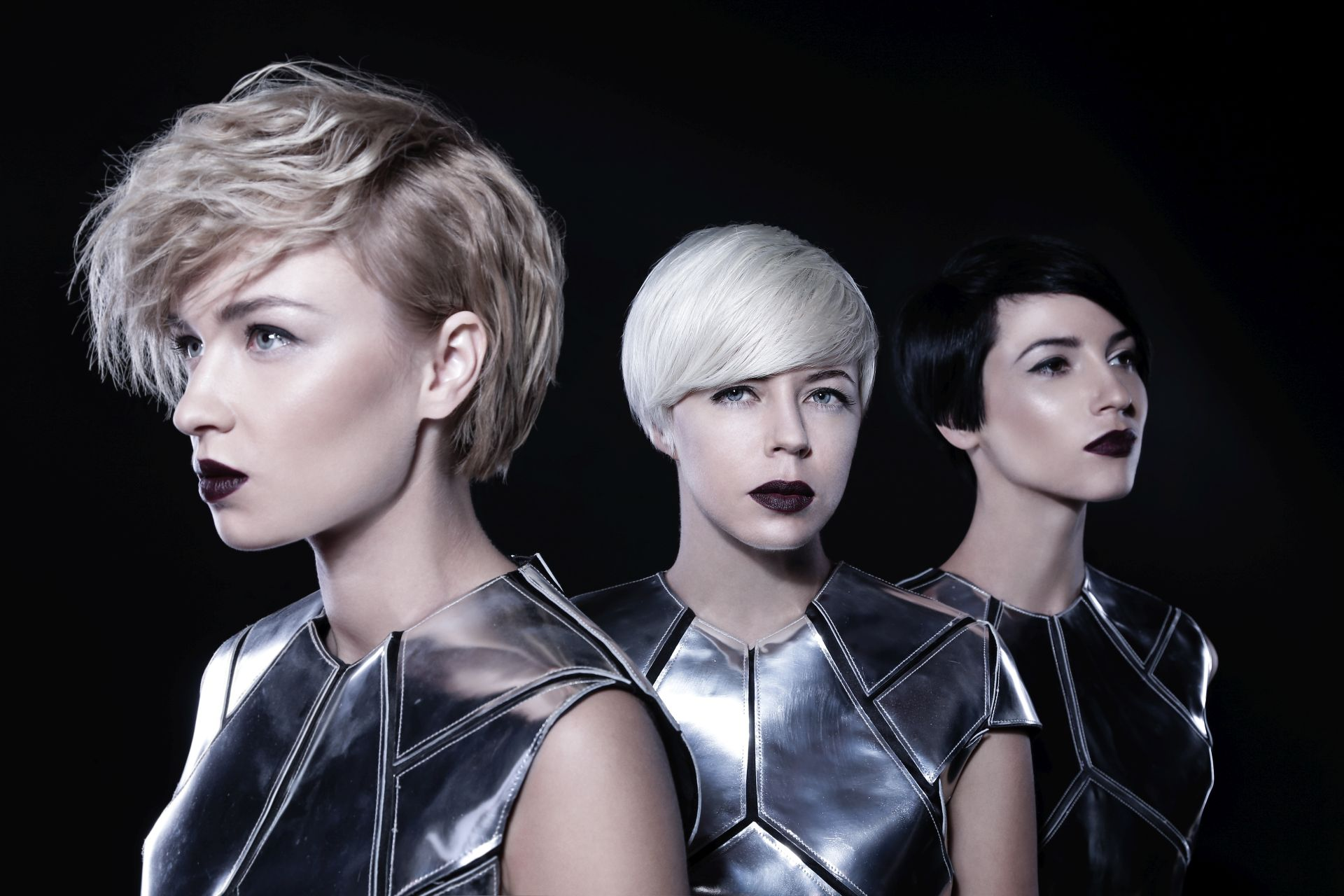
- Mariia Sorokina, Nata Zhyzhchenko and Daryna Sert

Background information
- Origin: Ukraine
- Genres: Experimental; electronic; chillwave; Folktronica; Synth-pop
- Years active: 2013–present
- Label: Vidlik
- Members: Nata Zhyzhchenko; Eugene Filatov; Daryna Sert; Mariya Sorokina; Yevhen Yovenko; Andriy Voichuk; Serhiy Kashyn; Mykola Blokshyn; Vitaliy Baklazhenko; Oleksandr Lisun; Taras Dovhopol; Vladyslav Petrenko
- Website: onuka.ua

Onuka ("granddaughter" in Ukrainian) is a Ukrainian electro-folk band. The project was created in 2013 by Yevhen Filatov and Nata Zhyzhchenko. Other group members are Daryna Sert (keyboardist and backing vocalist), Mariia Sorokina (percussionist) and Yevhen Yovenko (banduryst). The band's instrumentation includes electronic drums, trombones, French horns and Ukrainian folk instruments bandura and sopilka.

== History ==
The Ukrainian word onuka (Онукa) translates to "granddaughter", a tribute to lead singer Zhyzhchenko's grandfather and folk music instrument maker Oleksandr Shlionchyk. Zhyzhchenko started her music career as a member of the band Tomato Jaws, a band that she started with her brother. Tomato Jaws were active for 11 years. Several of its songs were remixed by Filatov's band The Maneken, ultimately leading to the creation of Onuka. Lead singer Nata Zhyzhchenko believes that she can revitalize old traditions and classic folk instruments (such as the bandura and sopilka), which disappeared in the Soviet times.

=== 2014: Beginnings, Look and ONUKA ===
Onuka presented their first EP Look on 15 May 2014. It includes four original songs and one mix. After release it immediately debuted at #1 in iTunes Ukraine.

Later on 15 October of the following year Onuka released their debut album ONUKA, it became the best-selling record of the month in Ukraine's iTunes. The album contains 10 tracks (8 in English, the other 2 in Ukrainian), four of which were included in their first EP. ONUKA took first place in the iTunes Ukraine online store, surpassing then-popular Okean Elzy. The album is filled with traditional Ukrainian sound motifs performed on the flute, bandura and trembita, all harmoniously combined with an electronic arrangement. Onuka presented the album at a concert in Kyiv at "Sentrum" on 17 October.

Immediately after that, the single "Zavtra" with a Ukrainian song of the same name was released on the American label Most Addictive Records. In December, Cultprostir ranked the band's debut album as "the best album of the year", and the band itself became "the debut of the year".

=== 2015–2016: VIDLIK ===
In May 2015, Onuka won the selection among Ukrainian bands to participate in the Hungarian Sziget festival, where they performed on August 11 at the British Knights Europe Stage.

Onuka's second EP, VIDLIK, which means a new beginning or countdown in Ukrainian, released on 8 February 2016. Zhyzhchenko cites the Chernobyl disaster and its impact on Ukraine as a major influence on the album. Its concert presentation took place in April 2016, just before the 30th anniversary of the incident.

The EP contains four songs: two in Ukrainian and two in English. The first track "Svitanok" is written based on a poem by the Kyiv street artist Jerzy Konopie. The second track "Vidlik" combines the voice of Google Translate with buhai. The third track "Other" was recorded back in March 2015, with the Merited Artist of Ukraine Andriy Voychuk playing the cymbal part in it. The last track, "1986", is dedicated to the incident on 26 April 1986, which contains a real recording of the negotiations of the Chernobyl nuclear power plant controllers on the day of the disaster, with Nata performing a small excerpt on the theremin in the track. The music from it was used in the documentary film about the accident at the Chernobyl nuclear power plant on the Ukrainian TV channel 1+1.

=== 2017–2020: MOZAЇKA ===
Onuka was featured in an interval act at the 2017 Eurovision Song Contest, performing with the NAONI folk orchestra.

On 7 July 2017 Onuka released the first song "Vsesvit" from the band's new album MOZAЇKA as a single. The founder of the French band Deep Forest Éric Mouquet participated in the recording. Later on 7 November they released another single "Guns Don't Shoot".

The new album continues and develops the ideas of the project’s two previous releases. According to Nata Zhyzhchenko, MOZAЇKA (meaning mosaics in English) is "a story about a series of amazing coincidences, circumstances and symbols." It is a solid canvas assembled from hundreds of small parts and fragments. There are two main leitmotifs running through the entire album: the first is Nata’s personal story, her experiences, feelings, memories, dedications to a loved one and grandmother, true friends and musical idols of childhood. The second leitmotif is Nata’s reaction to surrounding events and phenomena, such as the Chernobyl disaster. Also the album features the anti-war manifesto track "GUNS DON’T SHOOT": it’s not the weapon that shoot, it’s the man who shoots. The album was named the best Ukrainian album of the year at the APrize 2019 awards.

=== 2021–2022: KOLIR ===
With the assistance of the Embassy of Ukraine in the People's Republic of China, the band represented Ukraine at the 21st annual International Festival "Meet in Beijing", one of the largest artistic events traditionally held at the National Performing Arts Center, organized by the Ministry of Culture and Tourism of the People's Republic of China, the State Film and Television Administration of the People's Republic of China, the People's Government of Beijing and the China Arts and Entertainment Group.

The third album of the project KOLIR was released on 18 June 2021. It includes 10 songs, including the already released "XASHI", "ZENIT", "SEANS" and "UYAVY" with the participation of the band DakhaBraha.

=== 2023–present: ROOM ===
ONUKA released their fifth album ROOM on 21 July 2023. According to the group leader Nata Zhyzhchenko, the album is a manifesto dedicated to Ukrainians - from military personnel and volunteers to millions of others, "who, despite everything, continue their everyday work." As part of the album's tour, they performed in Prague on 12 May 2024, part of the profits from which they intend to send to the purchase of medical equipment for Ukrainian military medics.

== Members ==
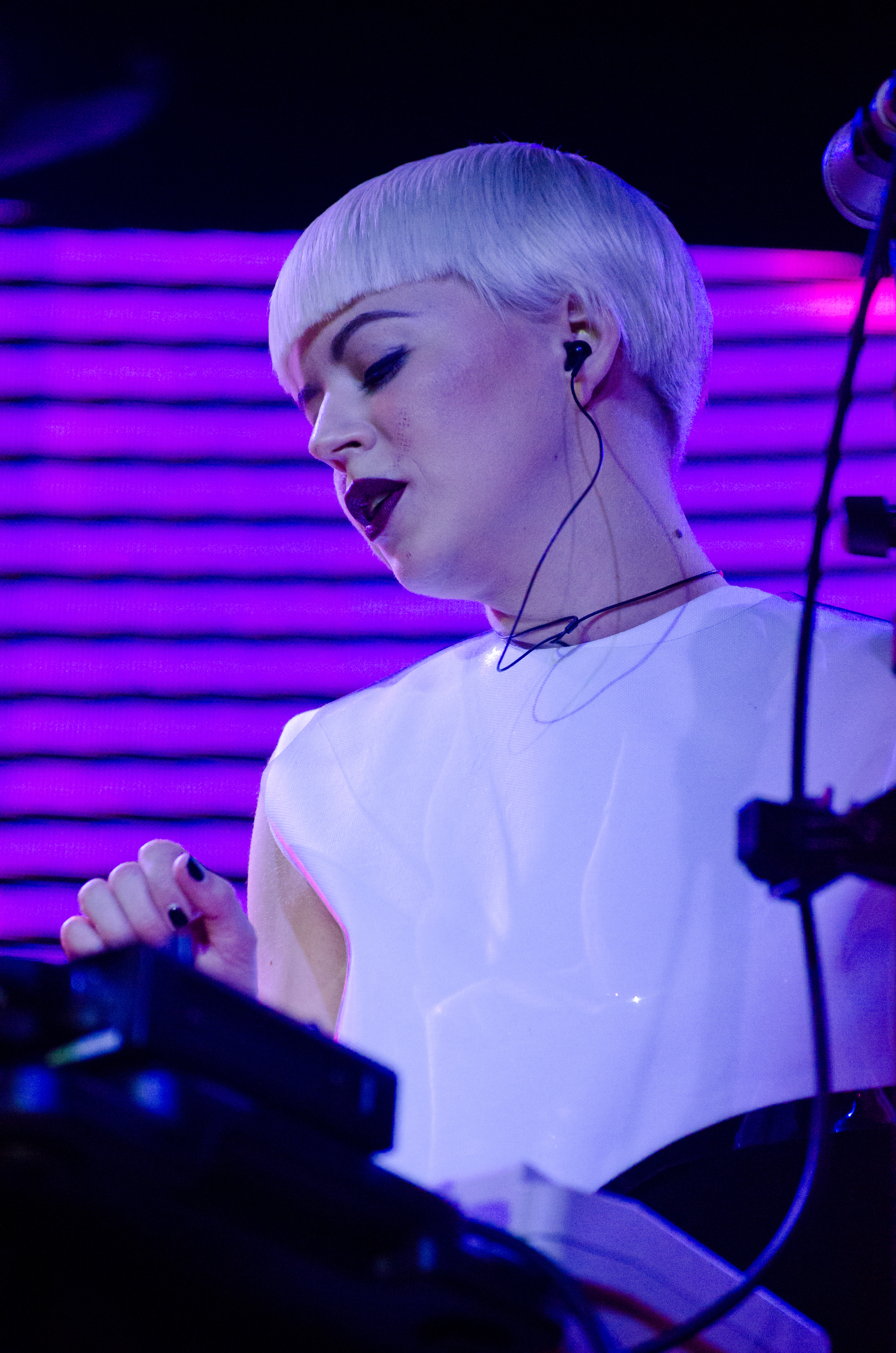
Nata Zhyzhchenko

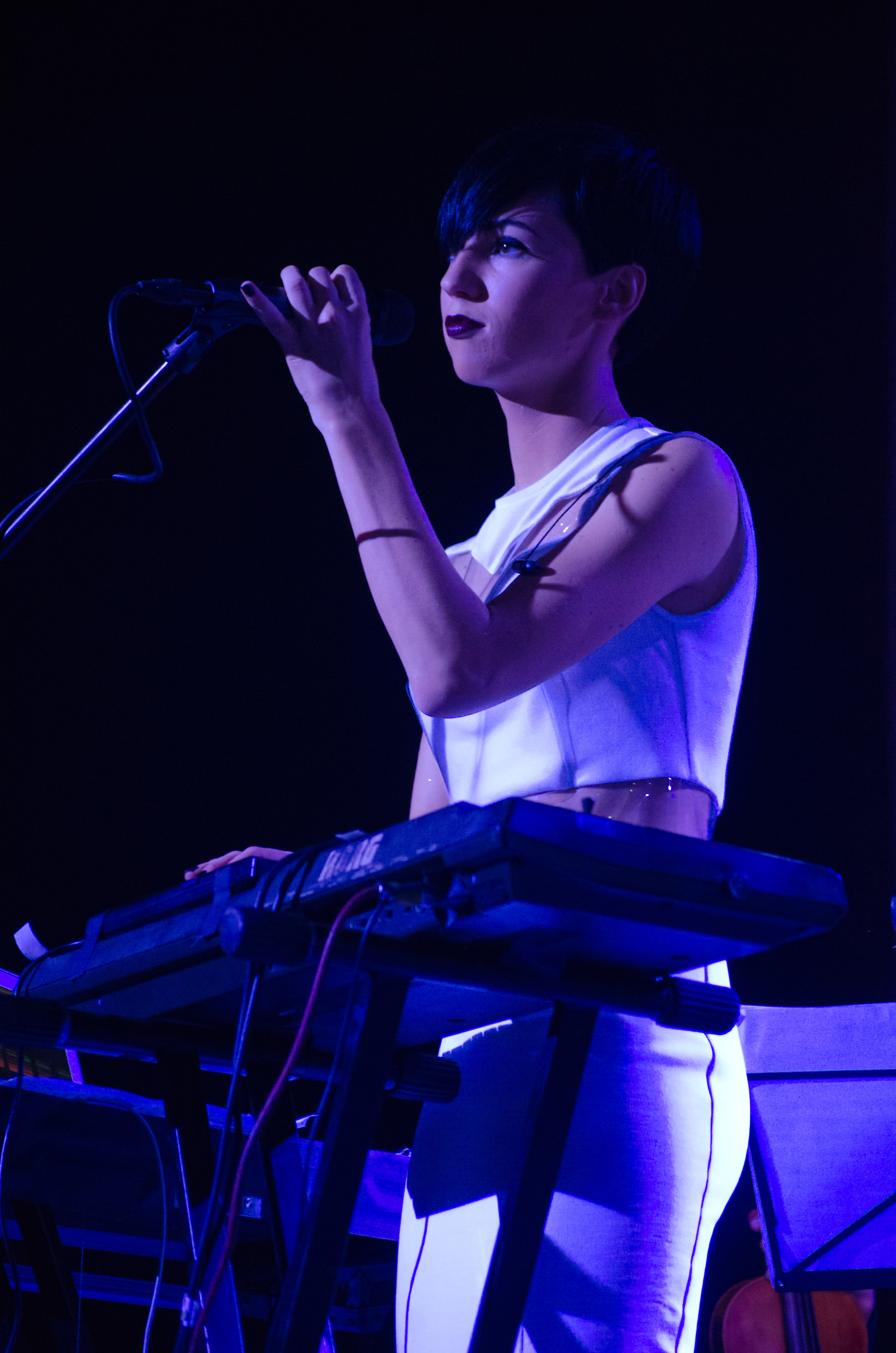
Daryna Sert

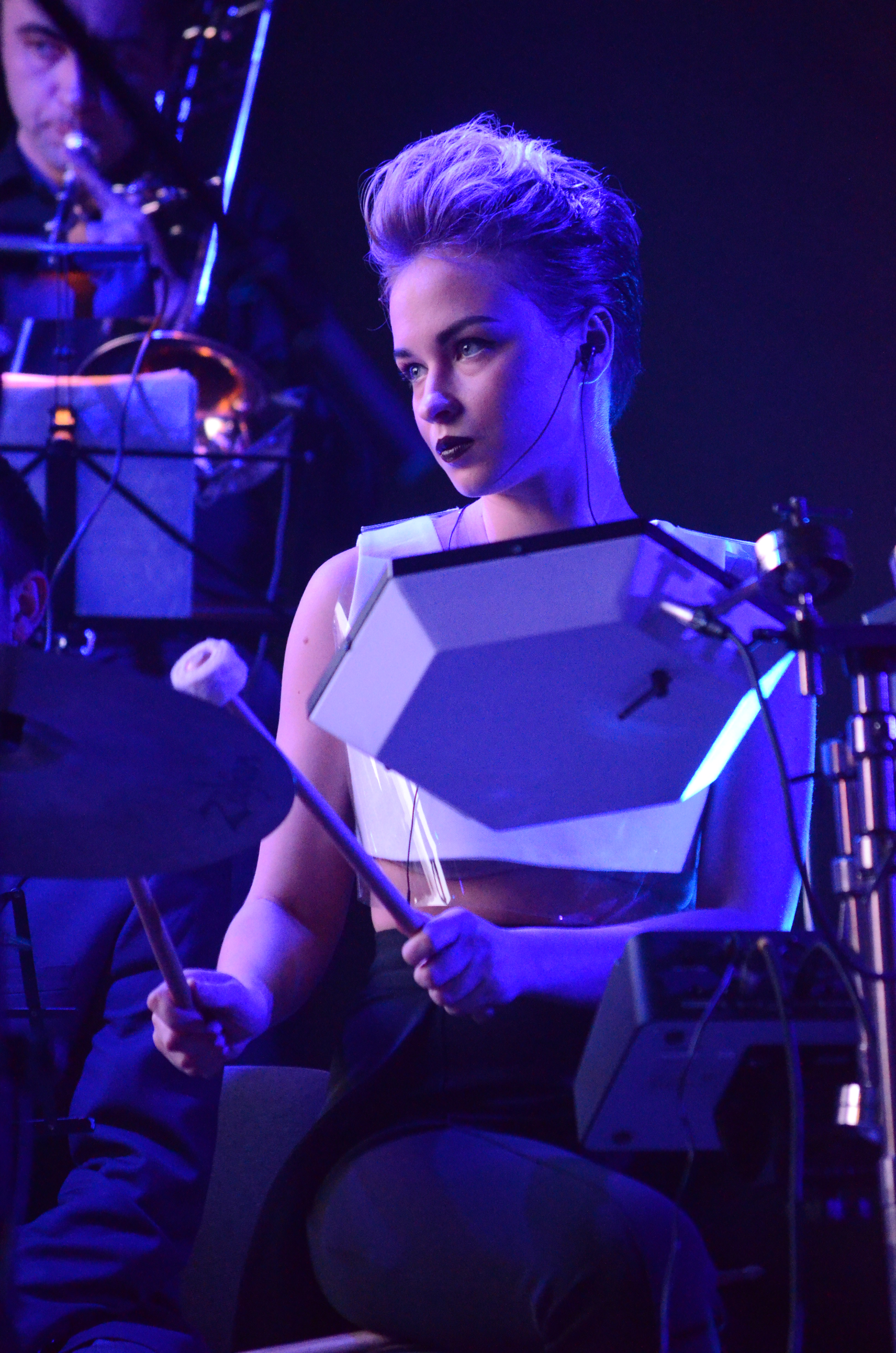
Mariya Sorokina

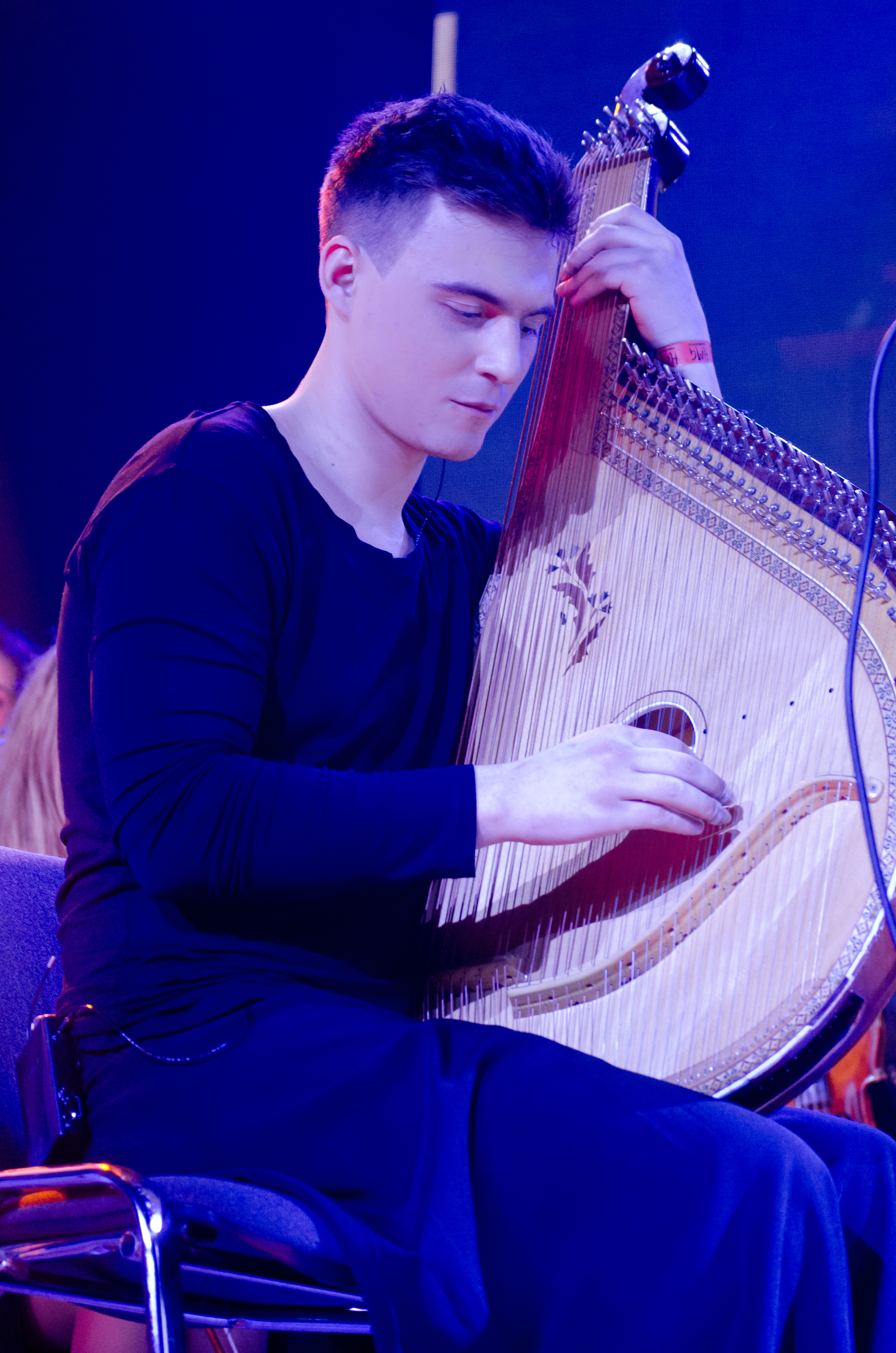
Yevhen Yovenko

Below is a list of members and their instruments:

- Nata Zhyzhchenko: vocals, sopilka, percussion, dream-drum, sampler, omnichord;
- Darina Sert: keyboards, sampler, backing vocals;
- Maria Sorokina: drums;
- Evgeniy Yovenko: bandura, bugay, sampler, calf;
- Andrey Voychuk: dulcimer, drymba, harp;
- Sergey Kashin: trombone, trembita;
- Nikolay Bloshkin: trombone, trembita;
- Vitaly Baklazhenko: trombone;
- Alexander Lisun: trombone;
- Taras Dovgopol: horn, Cossack trumpet;
- Vladislav Petrenko: horn.

Onuka also have a costume designer Lesya Patoka and a hairdresser Andriy Krupchynskyi.

=== Previous members ===
- Taras Stoliar: bandura

== Discography ==
=== Studio albums ===
Title	Details	Peak chart positions
Title	Details	UKR
Onuka	Released: 15 October 2014; Label: Enjoy! Records; Format: Digital download, CD. Vinyl	—
Mozaїka	Released: 22 March 2018; Label: Vidlik Records; Format: Digital download, CD, Vinyl	—
KOLIR	Released: 18 June 2021; Label: Vidlik Records; Format: Digital download, CD, Vinyl	—
Ukrainian Constructivism (with Yevhen Filatov)	Released: 27 May 2022; Label: Vidlik Records; Format: Digital download	—
ROOM	Released: 21 July 2023; Label: Vidlik Records; Format: Digital download, CD, Vinyl	—

=== Live albums ===
Title	Details	Peak chart positions
Title	Details	UKR
Live with NAONI Orchestra	Released: 11 December 2017; Label: Vidlik Records; Format: Digital download, Vinyl	—
Mozaїka Live with NAONI Orchestra	Released: 25 December 2019; Label: Vidlik Records; Format: Digital download	—

=== EPs ===
Title	Details	Peak chart positions
Title	Details	UKR
Look	Released: 15 May 2014; Label: Enjoy! Records; Format: Digital download, CD	—
Vidlik	Released: 22 February 2016; Label: VIDLIK; Format: Digital download, CD, Vinyl	—

=== Singles ===
Title	Year	Peak chart positions	Album
Title	Year	UKR	Album
"Look"	2013	—	Look and Onuka
"Time"	2015	—	Look and Onuka
"Misto"	2015	—	Look and Onuka
"City"	2015	—	Non-album single
"Svitanok"	2016	16	Vidlik
"Vidlik"	2016	—	Vidlik
"19 86"	2017	—	Vidlik
"Other" (featuring NAONI Orchestra)	2017	—	Vidlik
"Vsesvit"	2017	—	Mozaika
"Guns Don't Shoot"	2017	—	Mozaika
"Strum"	2018	—	Mozaika
"XASHI"	2018	55	KOLIR
"Zenit"	2019	61	KOLIR
"CEAHC"	2020	22	KOLIR
"UYAVY" (featuring DakhaBrakha)	2021	—	KOLIR
"PEREMOHA"	2023	—	ROOM
"—" denotes release that did not chart or was not released.

== Recognition ==
Onuka was nominated for the Ukrainian Yuna Music Awards in the Discovery of the Year category.

Preceded by Justin Timberlake	Eurovision Song Contest; Final Interval act 2017	Succeeded by Branko, Sara Tavares & Mayra Andrade
