= Varnița (Miletin) =

- Location within Romania

Location
- Country: Romania
- Counties: Botoșani County
- Villages: Frumușica

Physical characteristics
- Mouth: Miletin
  - coordinates: 47.5714°N 26.9162°E
- Length: 13 km (8.1 mi)
- Basin size: 72 km^{2} (28 sq mi)
- Discharge
  - location: *
  - minimum: 0.004 m^{3}/s (0.14 cu ft/s)
  - maximum: 37.60 m^{3}/s (1,328 cu ft/s)

Basin features
- Progression: Miletin→ Jijia→ Prut→ Danube→ Black Sea
- Tributaries
  - left: Cordun
- River code: XIII.1.15.25.4

The Varnița is a right tributary of the river Miletin in Romania. It flows into the Miletin in Flămânzi. Its length is 13 km (8.1 mi) and its basin size is 72 km^{2} (28 sq mi).
