= Glăvănești (river) =

River in Romania

- Location within Romania

Location
- Country: Romania
- Counties: Botoșani, Iași
- Villages: Călărași, Glăvănești

Physical characteristics
- Mouth: Jijia
  - location: Andrieșeni
  - coordinates: 47.5273°N 27.2794°E
- Length: 12 km (7.5 mi)
- Basin size: 56 km^{2} (22 sq mi)
- Discharge
  - location: *
  - minimum: 0 m^{3}/s (0 cu ft/s)
  - maximum: 6.4 m^{3}/s (230 cu ft/s)

Basin features
- Progression: Jijia→ Prut→ Danube→ Black Sea
- Tributaries
  - left: Chișcata, Cracalia, Goțcoaia
- River code: XIII.1.15.21

The Glăvănești is a left tributary of the river Jijia in Romania. It flows into the Jijia in Andrieșeni. Its length is 12 km (7.5 mi) and its basin size is 56 km^{2} (22 sq mi).
