= Horoghiuca =

- Location within Romania

Location
- Country: Romania
- Counties: Botoșani County
- Villages: Pădureni

Physical characteristics
- Mouth: Miletin
  - coordinates: 47.6201°N 26.7812°E
- Length: 10 km (6.2 mi)
- Basin size: 86 km^{2} (33 sq mi)
- Discharge
  - location: *
  - minimum: 0 m^{3}/s (0 cu ft/s)
  - maximum: 17.20 m^{3}/s (607 cu ft/s)

Basin features
- Progression: Miletin→ Jijia→ Prut→ Danube→ Black Sea
- Tributaries
  - left: Pârâul Mare, Prisaca
- River code: XIII.1.15.25.3

The Horoghiuca is a right tributary of the river Miletin in Romania. It flows into the Miletin in Coșula. Its length is 10 km (6.2 mi) and its basin size is 86 km^{2} (33 sq mi).
