= Bezerc =

- Location within Romania

Location
- Country: Romania
- Counties: Botoșani County

Physical characteristics
- Mouth: Jijia
  - coordinates: 47.9461°N 26.5038°E
- Length: 11 km (6.8 mi)
- Basin size: 30 km^{2} (12 sq mi)
- Discharge
  - location: *
  - minimum: 0.002 m^{3}/s (0.071 cu ft/s)
  - maximum: 4.8 m^{3}/s (170 cu ft/s)

Basin features
- Progression: Jijia→ Prut→ Danube→ Black Sea
- River code: XIII.1.15.4

The Bezerc is a left tributary of the river Jijia in Romania. It flows into the Jijia in Carasa. Its length is 11 km (6.8 mi) and its basin size is 30 km^{2} (12 sq mi).
