= Prisaca River =

Prisaca River may refer to the following rivers in Romania:

- Prisaca, a tributary of the Crișul Negru in Bihor County
- Prisaca, a tributary of the Horoghiuca in Botoșani County
- Prisaca, a tributary of the Gusec in Caraș-Severin County
- Prisaca, a tributary of the Râul Mare in Alba County
