= Păiș =

- Location within Romania

Location
- Country: Romania
- Counties: Iași County

Physical characteristics
- Mouth: Jijioara
  - coordinates: 47.3672°N 27.2144°E
- Length: 12 km (7.5 mi)
- Basin size: 52 km^{2} (20 sq mi)

Basin features
- Progression: Jijioara→ Jijia→ Prut→ Danube→ Black Sea
- Tributaries
  - right: Barboșica
- River code: XIII.1.15.27.2

The Păiș is a right tributary of the river Jijioara in Romania. It flows into the Jijioara in Focuri. Its length is 12 km (7.5 mi) and its basin size is 52 km^{2} (20 sq mi).
