= Jijioara =

Jijioara Gârla Morii
- Location within Romania

Location
- Country: Romania
- Counties: Iași County

Physical characteristics
- Mouth: Jijia
  - coordinates: 47.3218°N 27.4313°E
- Length: 34 km (21 mi)
- Basin size: 237 km^{2} (92 sq mi)

Basin features
- Progression: Jijia→ Prut→ Danube→ Black Sea

The Jijioara or Gârla Morii is a right tributary of the river Jijia in Romania. It discharges into the Jijia near Larga-Jijia. Its length is 34 km (21 mi) and its basin size is 237 km^{2} (92 sq mi).

== Tributaries ==
The following rivers are tributaries to the river Jijioara (from source to mouth):

- Left: Borosoaia, Catargiu, Lacul Negru
- Right: Păiș, Sbanț
