= Recea (Miletin) =

- Location within Romania

Location
- Country: Romania
- Counties: Botoșani, Iași

Physical characteristics
- Mouth: Miletin
  - coordinates: 47.4696°N 27.2049°E
- Length: 17 km (11 mi)
- Basin size: 68 km^{2} (26 sq mi)
- Discharge
  - location: Mouth
  - minimum: 0 m^{3}/s (0 cu ft/s)
  - maximum: 15.60 m^{3}/s (551 cu ft/s)

Basin features
- Progression: Miletin→ Jijia→ Prut→ Danube→ Black Sea
- Tributaries
  - left: Păiușeni
- River code: XIII.1.15.25.9

The Recea is a left tributary of the river Miletin in Romania. It flows into the Miletin in Șipote. Its length is 17 km (11 mi) and its basin size is 68 km^{2} (26 sq mi).
