= Ciritei =

Ciritei may refer to several places in Romania:

- Ciritei, a village in Trușești Commune, Botoșani County
- Ciritei, a district in the city of Piatra Neamț, Neamț County
