= Drâslea =

Drâslea Drislea
- Location within Romania

Location
- Country: Romania
- Counties: Botoșani County
- Villages: Socrujeni, Drislea

Physical characteristics
- Mouth: Jijia
  - coordinates: 47.7370°N 27.0249°E
- Length: 22 km (14 mi)
- Basin size: 94 km^{2} (36 sq mi)
- Discharge
  - location: *
  - minimum: 0.001 m^{3}/s (0.035 cu ft/s)
  - maximum: 74.60 m^{3}/s (2,634 cu ft/s)

Basin features
- Progression: Jijia→ Prut→ Danube→ Black Sea
- Tributaries
  - left: Iazul lui Stavri, Valea Ciolpanilor
- River code: XIII.1.15.16

The Drâslea (also: Drislea) is a right tributary of the river Jijia in Romania. It flows into the Jijia near Trușești. Its length is 22 km (14 mi) and its basin size is 94 km^{2} (36 sq mi).
