= Recea =

Recea may refer to the following places:

== Romania ==
- Recea, Argeș, a commune in Argeș County
- Recea, Brașov, a commune in Brașov County
- Recea, Maramureș, a commune in Maramureș County
- Recea, a village in Căteasca Commune, Argeș County
- Recea, a village in Horgești Commune, Bacău County
- Recea, a village in Bisoca Commune, Buzău County
- Recea, a village in Tulgheș Commune, Harghita County
- Recea, a village in Țibănești Commune, Iași County
- Recea, a village in Punghina Commune, Mehedinți County
- Recea, a village attached to Ungheni town, Mureș County
- Recea, a village in Ion Creangă Commune, Neamț County
- Recea, a village in Valea Mare Commune, Olt County
- Recea, a village in Vârșolț Commune, Sălaj County
- Recea, a village in Iana Commune, Vaslui County
- Recea, a tributary of the Moara in Bacău County
- Recea (Cerna), a tributary of the Cerna in Vâlcea County
- Recea (Miletin), a tributary of the Miletin in Botoșani and Iași Counties

== Moldova ==
- Recea, Rîșcani, a commune in Rîșcani district
- Recea, Strășeni, a commune in Strășeni district
