= Scânteia (disambiguation) =

Scânteia may refer to:

- Scînteia, a former newspaper in Romania
- Scânteia, Ialomița, a commune in Ialomița County, Romania
- Scânteia, Iași, a commune in Iași County, Romania
- Scânteia, a village in Jariștea Commune, Vrancea County, Romania
- Scânteia (river), a tributary of the Miletin in Botoșani and Iași Counties, Romania
