= Frasin (Jijia) =

Tributary of the river Jijia in Romania

- Location within Romania

Location
- Country: Romania
- Counties: Iași County
- Villages: Roșcani, Rădeni, Probota, Cârniceni

Physical characteristics
- Mouth: Jijia
  - coordinates: 47.3157°N 27.5154°E
- Length: 25 km (16 mi)
- Basin size: 66 km^{2} (25 sq mi)

Basin features
- Progression: Jijia→ Prut→ Danube→ Black Sea
- Tributaries
  - right: Optoceni
- River code: XII.1.15.31

The Frasin is a left tributary of the river Jijia in Romania. It flows into the Jijia near Cârniceni. Its length is 25 km (16 mi) and its basin size is 66 km^{2} (25 sq mi).
