= Epureanu =

Epureanu or Iepureanu is a Romanian surname derived from the word iepure meaning "rabbit" by adding the locative suffix -anu indicative that a person is from a place whose name is associated with hares/rabbits: Iepure, Iepureni, etc. Notable people with the surname include:

- Alexandru Epureanu (born 1986), Moldovan footballer
- Manolache Costache Epureanu (1823–1880), Romanian politician
- Serghei Epureanu (born 1976), Moldovan footballer
