= Copălău =

- Commune
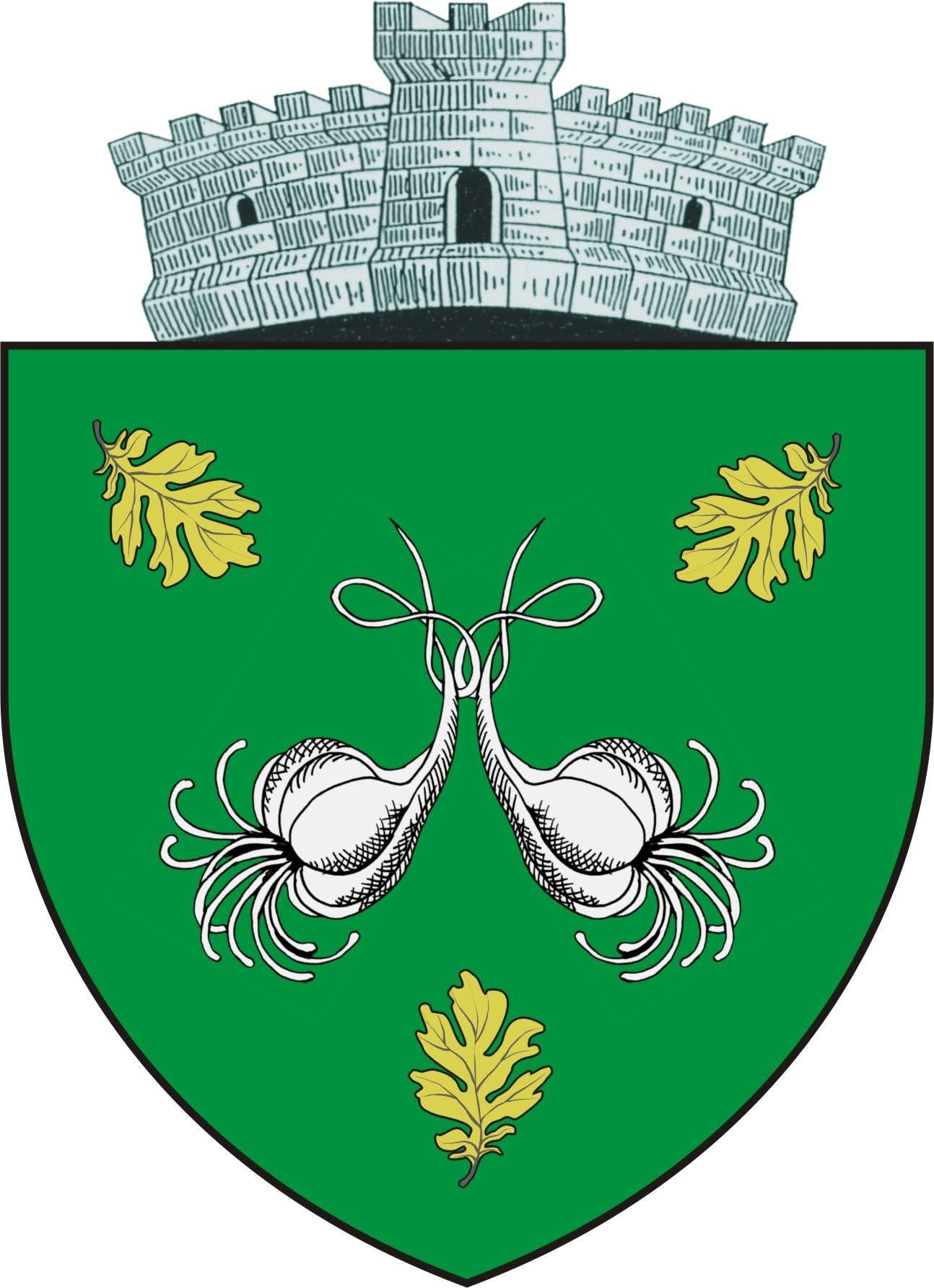
- Coat of arms

- Location in Botoșani County

- Location in Romania
- Coordinates: 47°37′N 26°50′E
- Country: Romania
- County: Botoșani

Government
  - Mayor (2020–2024): Ciprian Ivanov (PNL)
- Area: 43.46 km^{2} (16.78 sq mi)
- Elevation: 100 m (330 ft)
- Highest elevation: 262 m (860 ft)
- Population (2021-12-01): 3,996
  - Density: 91.95/km^{2} (238.1/sq mi)
- Time zone: UTC+02:00 (EET)
  - Summer (DST): UTC+03:00 (EEST)
- Postal code: 717060
- Vehicle reg.: BT
- Website: www.copalau.ro

Copălău is a commune in Botoșani County, Western Moldavia, Romania. It is composed of three villages: Cerbu, Copălău, and Cotu. It included four other villages until 2003, when these were detached to form Coșula commune.

== Geography ==
The commune is situated on the Moldavian Plain, on the banks of the river Miletin. It is located in the southern part of the county, 22 km (14 mi) from the county seat, Botoșani. To the north, Copălău borders Sulița commune, to the south and east the town of Flămânzi, and to the west and northwest Coșula and Bălușeni communes.

== Copălău garlic ==
It is said that the garlic of Copălău is the best in Romania. Continuing a tradition that dates back centuries, more than 40% of the locals cultivate the subspecies of Allium sativum; the bulbs are medium-sized and oval, weighing about 45 g (1.6 oz), with only 4 to 5 cloves. Considered unique due to the soil's quality, the Copălău garlic has gained fame both nationally and internationally; as a result, authorities are preparing to register it as a product with a protected geographical indication.

== Natives ==
- Adriana Bazon (b. 1963), rower
- Florica Lavric (1962–2014), rower
