= Costuleni =

Costuleni may refer to:

== Geography ==
Two border towns along the Prut River (and united from 1922 to 1940):

- Costuleni, Iași, a commune in Iaşi County, Romania
- Costuleni, Ungheni, a commune in Ungheni district, Moldova

== Football ==
- FC Costuleni, a Moldovan football team
