= Varnița =

Varnița may refer to:

- Varnița, Anenii Noi, Moldova
- Varnița, a village in Șiștarovăț commune, Arad County, Romania
- Varnița, a village in Șirna commune, Prahova County, Romania
- Varnița, a village in Răcoasa commune, Vrancea County, Romania
- Varnița (Miletin), a tributary of the Miletin in Botoșani County, Romania
- Varnița, a tributary of the Lozna in Caraș-Severin County, Romania
- Varnița, a tributary of the Șușița in Vrancea County, Romania
