= Bohotin =

- Location within Romania

Location
- Country: Romania
- Counties: Iași County

Physical characteristics
- Mouth: Prut
  - coordinates: 46.9033°N 28.0825°E
- Length: 22 km (14 mi)
- Basin size: 107 km^{2} (41 sq mi)

Basin features
- Progression: Prut→ Danube→ Black Sea
- Tributaries
  - left: Cozia
- River code: XIII.1.16

The Bohotin is a right tributary of the river Prut in Romania. It flows into the Prut in Gura Bohotin, near Gorban. Its length is 22 kilometres (14 mi) and its basin size is 107 square kilometres (41 sq mi).
