= Tamarca =

Tamarca Tătarca
- Location within Romania

Location
- Country: Romania
- Counties: Iași County

Physical characteristics
- Mouth: Jijia
  - coordinates: 47.1036°N 27.8087°E
- Length: 11 km (6.8 mi)
- Basin size: 31 km^{2} (12 sq mi)

Basin features
- Progression: Jijia→ Prut→ Danube→ Black Sea

The Tamarca or Tătarca is a right tributary of the river Jijia in eastern Romania. It discharges into the Jijia near Osoi. Its length is 11 km (6.8 mi) and its basin size is 31 km^{2} (12 sq mi).
