= Scânteia (river) =

- Location within Romania

Location
- Country: Romania
- Counties: Botoșani, Iași
- Villages: Slobozia, Leahu-Nacu

Physical characteristics
- Mouth: Miletin
  - coordinates: 47.5051°N 27.0036°E
- Length: 17 km (11 mi)
- Basin size: 62 km^{2} (24 sq mi)
- Discharge
  - location: *
  - minimum: 0.002 m^{3}/s (0.071 cu ft/s)
  - maximum: 33.0 m^{3}/s (1,170 cu ft/s)

Basin features
- Progression: Miletin→ Jijia→ Prut→ Danube→ Black Sea
- River code: XIII.1.15.25.5

The Scânteia is a right tributary of the river Miletin in Romania. It flows into the Miletin in Prăjeni. Its length is 17 km (11 mi) and its basin size is 62 km^{2} (24 sq mi).
