= Pârâul lui Martin =

Pârâul lui Martin may refer to:

- Pârâul lui Martin, a tributary of the Schit in Neamț County
- Pârâul lui Martin (Jijia), a tributary of the Jijia in Botoșani County
