= Covasna River =

Covasna River may refer to the following rivers in Romania:

- Covasna (Jijia), tributary of the Jijia in Iași County
- Covasna River (Râul Negru), tributary of the Râul Negru (Olt basin) in Covasna County
