= Pavel Coruț =

Romanian writer (1949–2021)

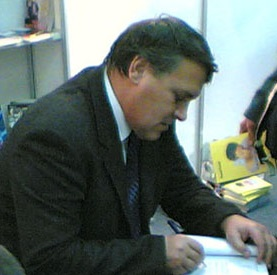
Pavel Coruț

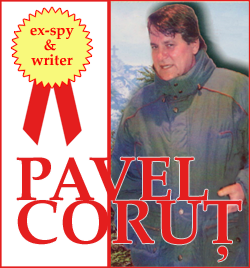
Pavel Coruț

Pavel Coruț (17 June 1949 – 28 October 2021) was a Romanian writer and Security intelligence officer. He wrote, among other things, about his experience as an intelligence and counterintelligence officer in Romania. His most popular books are Quinta spartă (Broken Quintet) and Fulgerul albastru ("Blue Lightning") of the Octogonul ("The Octagon") series.

Born in Glăvănești, Iași County, Coruț worked as an intelligence officer until 1990, when he was pensioned at 39-year-old by then Defense Minister, general Nicolae Militaru. After a period of being a journalist, signing as Paul Cernescu, Coruț became a full-time writer. He has written 170 books so far (by the end of February 2017), including fantasy novels and life-guiding books.

== Bibliography ==
=== Octogonul ===
1. Quinta spartă
2. Fulgerul albastru
3. Floarea de Argint
4. Balada Lupului Alb
5. Dincolo de frontiere
6. Să te naști sub steaua noastră!
7. Lumina Geto Daciei
8. Cântecul nemuririi
9. Singuri sub Crucea Nordului
10. Neînfrânții
11. Călător pe drum de aştri
12. A înflorit Speranța
13. Întoarcerea lui Zamolxe
14. Fiul Geto-Daciei
15. Tărâmul fericirii
16. Comoara Nibelungilor
17. Secretele exploratorilor astrali
18. Drumul învingătorilor
19. Război în ceruri
20. Expediția Cap Univers
21. Născuți pentru a învinge
22. Inimă de Român
23. Copii Speranței
24. Good bye, Nato, mon amour!
25. Sfârșitul imperiului ascuns
26. Omul din Carpați
27. Războiul zeilor
28. Victoria Alcorilor
29. Pacea Marilor Străbuni
30. Moartea zeilor străini
31. Poarta viitorului
32. Vânătorii de sioniști
33. Glasul Omului
34. Trăsnetul Geto-Dac
35. Coroana Ariană
36. Victoria Zeilor Albi
37. Triumful Oamenilor
38. Revanșa
39. Sângele Europei
40. Lumina coboară în Carpați
41. Oamenii trec de absolut
42. Speranțele nu mor niciodată
43. Noi trăim in viitor
44. Eu, Varain din Neamul Arienilor
45. Europeni, uniți-vă!
46. Viața merge înainte...
47. Riposta Creatorilor
48. Când mor uitările din noi...
49. Viața oamenilor creatori
50. Sfârșit de zbucium
51. Cristalul de foc
52. Navigăm printre enigme
53. Un fulger sfâșie bezna
54. Să-n vie Focul Vieții!
55. Chemarea Nemărginirii
56. Călăuza Alcoro-Vegană
57. Planeta fericiților
58. Pumnul de oțel
59. Sfântă ramură de OM
60. Lumina Omenirii
61. Treziți Eroii Civilizatori!
62. Mai tari decât destinul
63. Rupeți lanțurile robiei!
64. Zburăm cu Viața
65. Veghetorii ies din umbră
66. Extratereștrii coboară printre oameni
67. Sfârșitul marii rătăciri
68. Vise de viață omenească
69. Cu mintea rece și inima caldă
70. Lumini ce cresc în oameni
71. Vin salvatorii!
72. Și cresc speranțele din noi
73. Prin viitorul netrăit
74. Conducătorii din Carpați
75. Legea și forța
76. Teroarea
77. Urmașii zeilor
78. Conspirația spaimei și a urii
79. Incursiune în tărâmul uitat
80. Noi vom renaște dintr-un vis
81. Oamenii lui Zamolxe
82. Destin de daimon
83. Suflete de foc
84. Ziua Zeilor
85. Stăpânii din umbră
86. Profeții imperiului ocult
87. Suflete cutezătoare
88. Fantomele imperiului
89. Oameni contra bestii
90. Sămânța creatorilor
91. Taina muntelui ascuns
92. Noi suntem ținta
93. Cavalerii nobilei bresle
94. Pui de Fulger
95. Trandafirul Nisipurilor

=== Succesul (The Success) ===
1. Cheile succesului
2. Arta succesului la Români
3. Arta creației
4. Cartea adolescentului
5. Ghidul vieții sănătoase
6. Leacuri de suflet pentru fete și femei
7. Curs practic de arta succesului
8. Farmec feminin
9. Clanul învingătorilor
10. Faceți avere!
11. Cartea părinților
12. Vom trăi omenește!
13. Către culmile succesului (formula fericirii)
14. Arta succesului pentru copii
15. Cartea Creatorilor
16. Secretele vârstelor de aur (tineri, activi și fericiți de la 20 la 90 de ani)
17. Îngeri rebeli (carte pentru adolescenți inteligenți)

=== Romance ===
1. Să vii ca o părere ...
2. Ne-om întâlni în Cer
3. Vara ultimei iubiri
4. Flacăra iubirii
5. Dragoste și otravă
6. Iubirile unui marinar
7. Noaptea teilor vrăjiți
8. Sărutul de foc

=== Poetry ===
1. Descântece din neamul Geto-Dacilor
2. Vraja nopților albastre
3. Cântece Daco-Române
4. Parodii politico-religioase

=== Analysis of religious myth ===
1. Eva n-a fost mama noastră
2. Marile secrete
3. Mântuirea de după Cumplita Rătăcire

=== Autobiography ===
1. Un om

=== Historic novels ===
1. Ultimul mag

=== Origins ===
1. Codul lui Zamolxe
2. Luptele Zeilor
3. Calea Sperantei
