= Ioanel Sinescu =

Romanian physician (born 1951)

Ioanel C. Sinescu (born December 8, 1951) is a Romanian physician.

== Career ==
He was born in Movileni, Iași County. Following secondary studies in Iași and Câmpulung Moldovenesc, from 1971 to 1977 he attended the military section of the General Medicine Faculty at the Carol Davila University of Medicine and Pharmacy in Bucharest. From 1976 to 1979, he interned at a number of hospitals in Bucharest, specialising in surgery. From 1980 to 1983, he prepared as a urologist at Fundeni Hospital in the national capital, and has worked there as such since 1983.

He became a Doctor of Medicine in 1988, following the publication of a thesis at Carol Davila. Sinescu has studied abroad: in 1984, urological microsurgery at the University of California, Los Angeles School of Medicine and the University of Louisville School of Medicine (introducing the practice to Romania the following year); in 1989, extracorporeal shock wave lithotripsy (ESWL) and endourology at Hamburg and Munich; in 1990, ESWL in Beijing and Shanghai, and kidney transplantation in Tel Aviv; in 1991-1992, urologic oncology, reconstructive surgery, endourology and kidney transplantation in Paris; in 1993-1994, urologic oncology, reconstructive surgery and kidney transplantation at Louisville, Case Western Reserve University School of Medicine and the Cleveland Clinic; in 1997, kidney transplantation at the University of Cape Town; and in 2005, pancreas transplantation at the University of Minnesota Medical School. That year, Evenimentul Zilei newspaper named him one of Romania's ten best doctors, citing the fact that in the previous eight years, he had performed over 600 kidney transplants with a success rate of more than 97%.

Sinescu's mentor and predecessor was Professor Eugeniu Proca. Sinescu is president of the Romanian Urology Society and belongs to a number of international urological organisations. He has published widely, and is the editor of a four-volume Tratat de Urologie ("Treatise on Urology", 2008). In addition to several specialty treatises, he is the author of over 200 journal articles, monographs, medical films and courses for students. Since 1997, he has headed the Centre for Urological Surgery, Dialysis and Kidney Transplantation at the Fundeni Clinical Institute.

Concurrent with his medical practice, he has had a teaching career and Fundeni and Carol Davila. From 1979 to 1983, he was intern teaching assistant; university teaching assistant from 1983 to 1990; assistant professor from 1990 to 1993; university assistant professor from 1993 to 1998; and is university professor since then. He also became prorector at Carol Davila in 2004, advancing to rector in 2012. Sinescu was elected a titular member of the Romanian Academy in 2011.

== Controversy ==
Sinescu's hold on the prorectoral position came under attack in the summer of 2007, when he was accused of copying entire fragments and drawings from a 1957 American textbook for a work on clinical urology he published in 1998; he denounced the "slanderous" and "cowardly" campaign run against him by Gardianul newspaper, claiming it was the product of doctors opposed to his bid to enter the Academy. A 2012 report by the National Ethics Council exonerated Sinescu of the plagiarism charges.

Also in 2007, he drew criticism for the way he handled the prostate operation of the 92-year-old Patriarch of the Romanian Orthodox Church, Teoctist Arăpaşu, following which the latter died. However, he called such statements "irresponsible", and was cleared of any wrongdoing several months later by an investigative body. Other patients of his have included Valentin Ceauşescu and Radu Câmpeanu.

Sinescu and his wife Crina, a professor and cardiologist, have one daughter, also a physician. In 2000, President Emil Constantinescu awarded him the rank of Commodore of the Order of the Star of Romania.
