= Nata Zhyzhchenko =

Ukrainian multi-instrumental singer-songwriter, frontwoman of the band "ONUKA"

Nata Zhyzhchenko Ната Жижченко
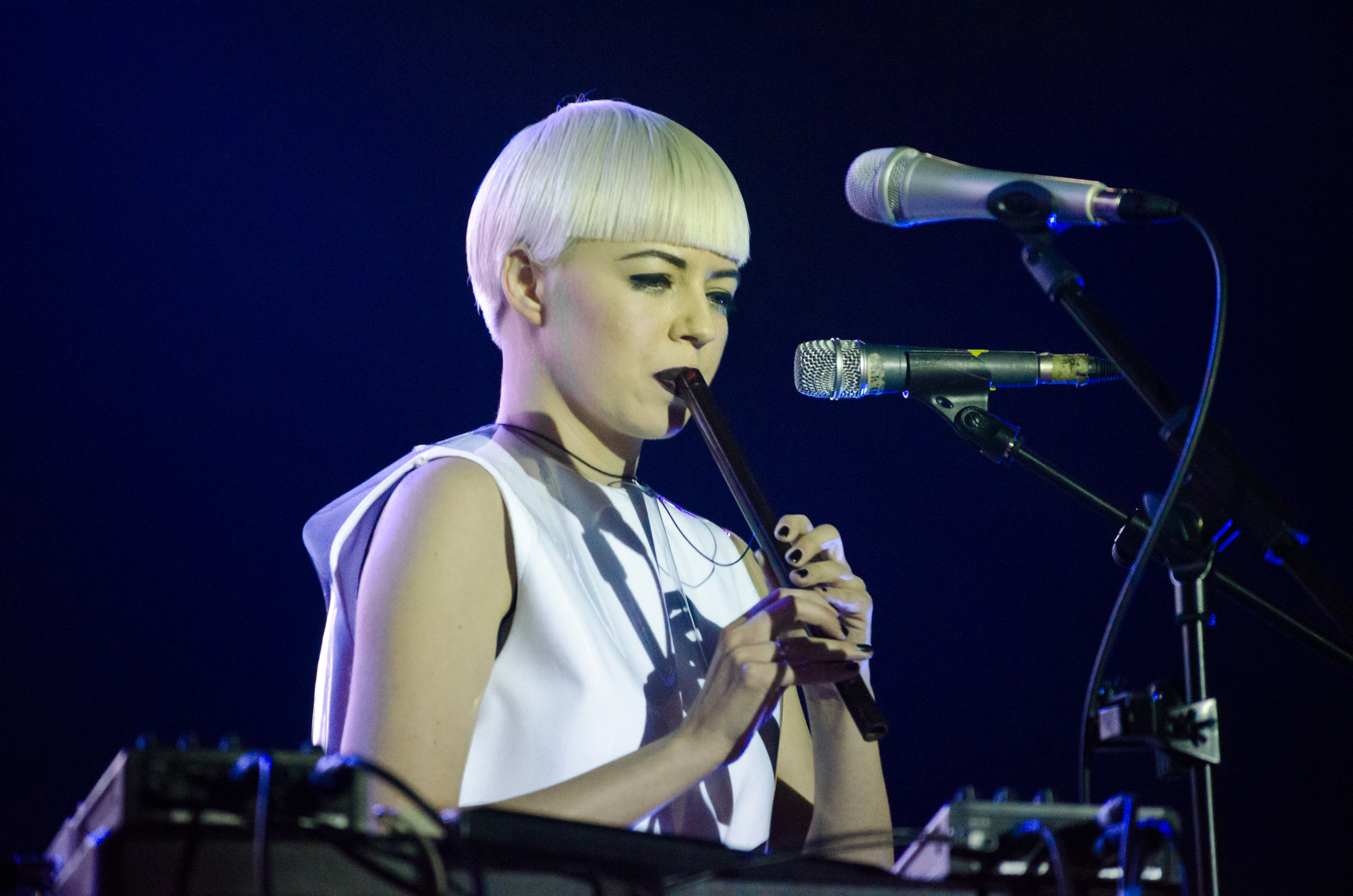
- Nata Zhyzhchenko in 2015

Background information
- Born: Nataliya Oleksandrivna Zhyzhchenko; 22 March 1985 (age 41); Kyiv, Soviet Ukraine
- Genres: Electronic; folk-pop
- Occupation: multi-instrumentaist
- Years active: 2002–present

Nataliya Oleksandrivna Zhyzhchenko (Ukrainian: Ната́лія Олександрівна Жижченко), married surname Filatova (Ukrainian: Філатова; born 22 March 1985, Kyiv) is a Ukrainian multi-instrumental singer-songwriter, frontwoman of the Ukrainian electro-folk band ONUKA and a former member of the bands "Tomato Jaws" and "KOOQLA". Known by her stage name Nata (Ukrainian: На́та).

== Early life and education ==
Born in a family of musicians, her grandfather is a Ukrainian folk musician Оleksandr Shlionchyk, from whom she learned to play sopilka at 4 years old. After birth her mother began working as a music teacher, which influenced her music taste.

She learnt fortepiano, flute and violin while at school, graduating with a gold medal. Then graduated from the Kyiv National University of Culture and Arts.

== Musical career ==
In 2002 Zhyzhchenko became a vocalist of an electronic bans "Tomato Jaws", which was created by her older brother. She considers it to be the first Ukrainian electronic music band which was performing live.

In 2013 "Tomato Jaws" broke up after Zhyzhchenko decided to lead a solo career under the nickname DJ Nata Tomata. In the summer of the same year together with Yevhen Filatov started working on the ONUKA project, which later formed into a band.

Nata Zhyzhchenko was included in the top-100 list of the most successful Ukrainian women in 2017 by NV.

On the 150th anniversary of Lesia Ukrainka's birthday on 25 February 2021 Zhyzhchenko began a poetical project "Khrestomatiya", in which she reads her favorite poems in various locations based on them.

On 11 July 2023 Zhyzhchenko was invited by Spotify to become the Ukrainian ambassador of Spotify Equal.

== Personal life ==
On 22 June 2016 Zhyzhchenko married Yevhen Filatov, after their long relationship which began in 2008. On 14 May 2020 they had a son, later on 1 June 2023 their daughter was born.

== Awards ==
- 2015: Elle Style Award as a Ukrainian musician of the year.
