= Iepureni =

Iepureni Epureni
- Location within Romania

Location
- Country: Romania
- Counties: Iași County
- Villages: Iepureni, Broșteni

Physical characteristics
- Mouth: Jijia
  - coordinates: 47.4495°N 27.3233°E
- Length: 10 km (6.2 mi)
- Basin size: 23 km^{2} (8.9 sq mi)

Basin features
- Progression: Jijia→ Prut→ Danube→ Black Sea
- River code: XIII.1.15.22

The Iepureni (also: Epureni) is a left tributary of the river Jijia in Romania. It flows into the Jijia in Iacobeni. Its length is 10 km (6.2 mi) and its basin size is 23 km^{2} (8.9 sq mi).
