= Putreda =

- Location within Romania

Location
- Country: Romania
- Counties: Botoșani County

Physical characteristics
- Mouth: Jijia
  - coordinates: 47.9279°N 26.5717°E
- Length: 10 km (6.2 mi)
- Basin size: 37 km^{2} (14 sq mi)
- Discharge
  - location: *
  - minimum: 0.002 m^{3}/s (0.071 cu ft/s)
  - maximum: 6.0 m^{3}/s (210 cu ft/s)

Basin features
- Progression: Jijia→ Prut→ Danube→ Black Sea
- Tributaries
  - right: Ghilăuca
- River code: XIII.1.15.7

The Putreda is a left tributary of the river Jijia in Romania. It flows into the Jijia in Corlăteni. Its length is 10 km (6.2 mi) and its basin size is 37 km^{2} (14 sq mi).
