= Cozia (river) =

- Location within Romania

Location
- Country: Romania
- Counties: Iași County

Physical characteristics
- Mouth: Bohotin
  - coordinates: 46.9173°N 28.0533°E
- Length: 20 km (12 mi)
- Basin size: 39 km^{2} (15 sq mi)

Basin features
- Progression: Bohotin→ Prut→ Danube→ Black Sea
- River code: XIII.1.16.1

The Cozia is a left tributary of the river Bohotin in Romania. It flows into the Bohotin near Gura Bohotin. Its length is 20 km (12 mi) and its basin size is 39 km^{2} (15 sq mi).
