= Mihăiasa =

- Location within Romania

Location
- Country: Romania
- Counties: Botoșani County
- Villages: Dragalina

Physical characteristics
- Mouth: Jijia
  - coordinates: 47.5762°N 27.2120°E
- Length: 12 km (7.5 mi)
- Basin size: 28 km^{2} (11 sq mi)
- Discharge
  - location: *
  - minimum: 0.001 m^{3}/s (0.035 cu ft/s)
  - maximum: 4.50 m^{3}/s (159 cu ft/s)

Basin features
- Progression: Jijia→ Prut→ Danube→ Black Sea
- River code: XIII.1.15.19

The Mihăiasa is a left tributary of the river Jijia in Romania. It flows into the Jijia in Pogorăști. Its length is 12 km (7.5 mi) and its basin size is 28 km^{2} (11 sq mi).
