= Pomârla =

- Commune
- Location in Botoșani County

- Location in Romania
- Coordinates: 48°3′N 26°19′E
- Country: Romania
- County: Botoșani
- Subdivisions: Pomârla, Hulubești, Racovăț

Government
  - Mayor (2024–2028): Dumitru Chelariu (PNL)
- Area: 105 km^{2} (41 sq mi)
- Elevation: 200 m (700 ft)
- Population (2021-12-01): 2,533
  - Density: 24/km^{2} (62/sq mi)
- Time zone: EET/EEST (UTC+2/+3)
- Postal code: 717300
- Area code: +40 x31
- Vehicle reg.: BT
- Website: www.pomarla.ro

Pomârla is a commune in Botoșani County, Western Moldavia, Romania. It is composed of three villages: Hulubești, Pomârla, Poiana, and Racovăț.

The commune lies on the banks of the river Pârâul lui Martin. It is located in the northwestern part of the county, 50 km (31 mi) from the county seat, Botoșani, next to the border with Ukraine.

== Natives ==
- Dimitrie Călugăreanu (1868–1937), physician, naturalist, and physiologist
- Andrei Dumitraș (born 1988), footballer
