= Roșcani, Iași =

Roșcani
- Commune
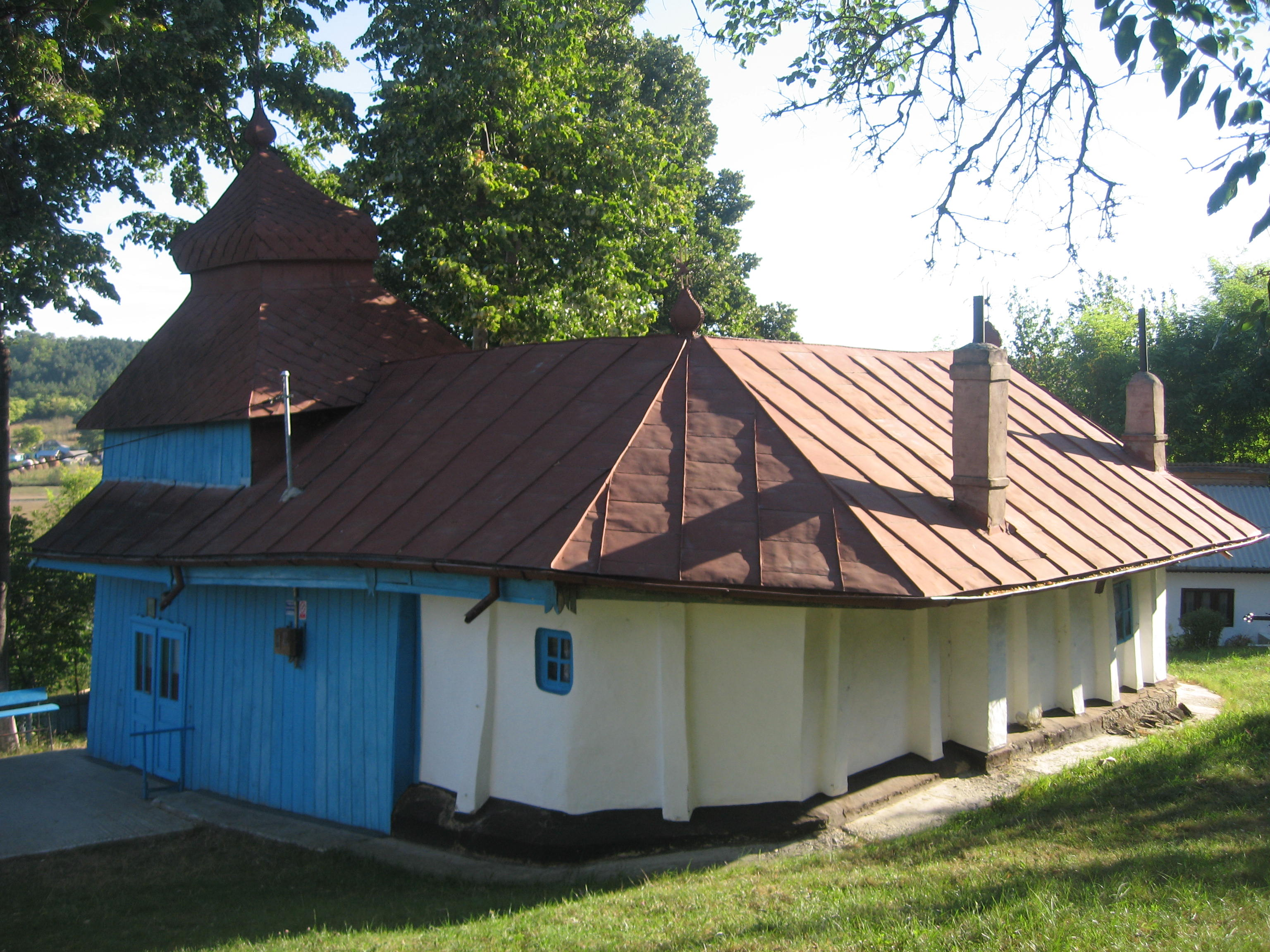

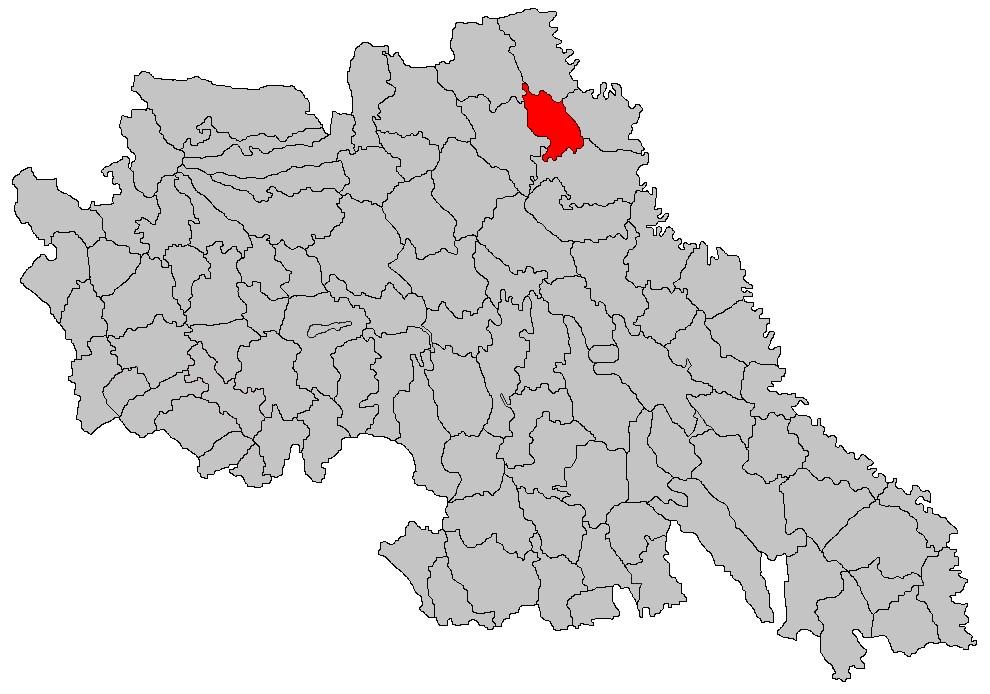
- Location in Iași County

- Location in Romania
- Coordinates: 47°27′N 27°23′E
- Country: Romania
- County: Iași
- Subdivisions: Rădeni, Roșcani

Government
  - Mayor (2024–2028): Ginovel Gheorghiu (PSD)
- Area: 37.99 km^{2} (14.67 sq mi)
- Elevation: 80 m (260 ft)
- Population (2021-12-01): 1,273
  - Density: 33.51/km^{2} (86.79/sq mi)
- Time zone: UTC+02:00 (EET)
  - Summer (DST): UTC+03:00 (EEST)
- Postal code: 707523
- Area code: +40 x32
- Vehicle reg.: IS
- Website: www.primariaroscani.ro

Roșcani is a commune in Iași County, Western Moldavia, Romania. It is composed of two villages, Rădeni and Roșcani.
