= Buhai =

- Location within Romania

Location
- Country: Romania
- Counties: Botoșani County
- Villages: Pădureni, Dorohoi

Physical characteristics
- Mouth: Jijia
  - location: Dorohoi
  - coordinates: 47.9715°N 26.3868°E
- Length: 18 km (11 mi)
- Basin size: 134 km^{2} (52 sq mi)
- Discharge
  - location: *
  - minimum: 0.003 m^{3}/s (0.11 cu ft/s)
  - maximum: 130 m^{3}/s (4,600 cu ft/s)

Basin features
- Progression: Jijia→ Prut→ Danube→ Black Sea
- Tributaries
  - right: Bahna, Pârâul Întors

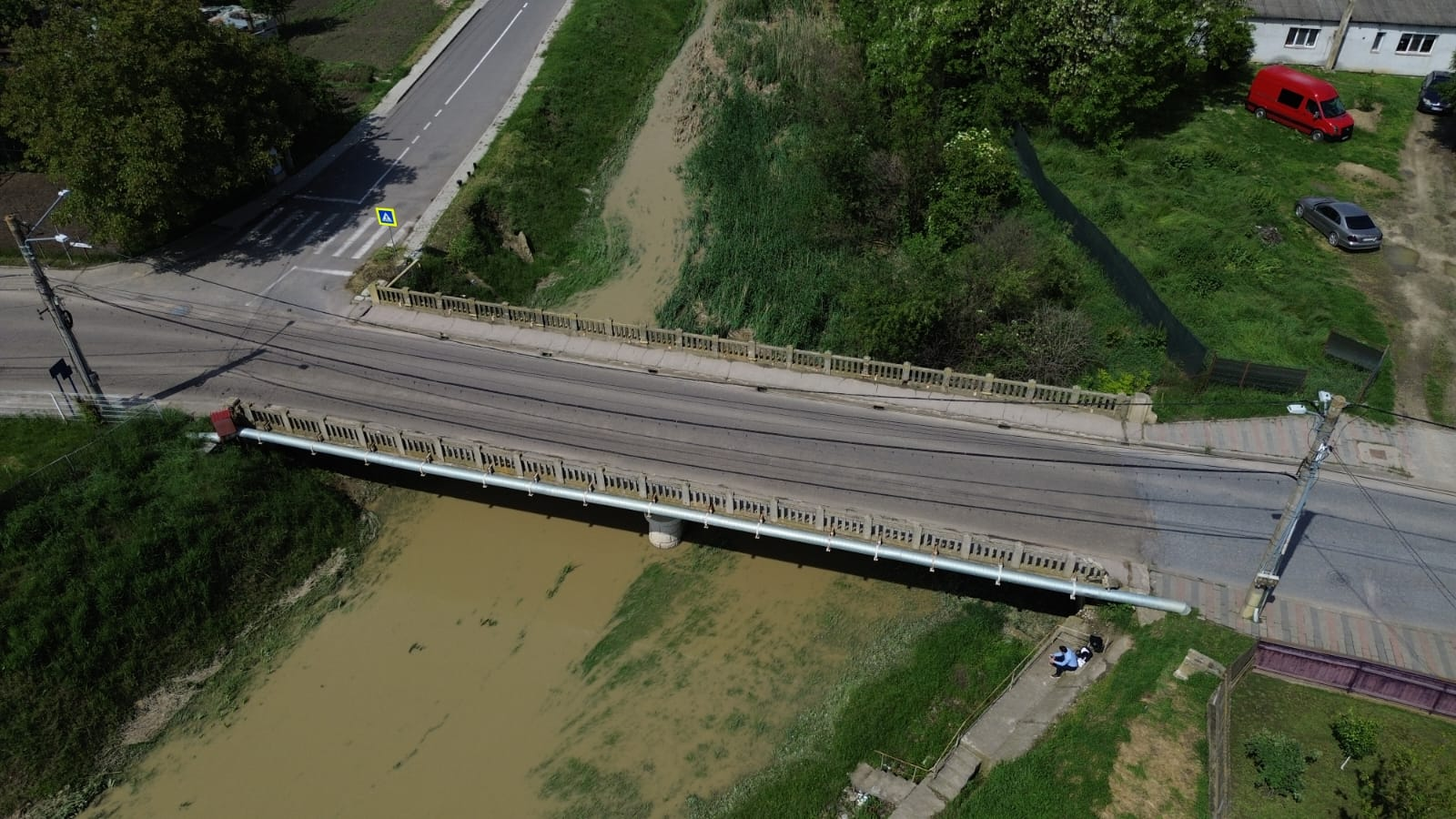
The right tributary of the Jijia

The Buhai is a right tributary of the river Jijia in Romania. It discharges into the Jijia near the city Dorohoi. Its length is 18 km (11 mi) and its basin size is 134 km^{2} (52 sq mi).
