= Pârâul lui Martin (Jijia) =

- Location within Romania

Location
- Country: Romania
- Counties: Botoșani County
- Villages: Pomârla

Physical characteristics
- Mouth: Jijia
  - coordinates: 48.0123°N 26.3427°E
- Length: 10 km (6.2 mi)
- Basin size: 38 km^{2} (15 sq mi)
- Discharge
  - location: *
  - minimum: 0.001 m^{3}/s (0.035 cu ft/s)
  - maximum: 6.10 m^{3}/s (215 cu ft/s)

Basin features
- Progression: Jijia→ Prut→ Danube→ Black Sea
- River code: XIII.1.15.2

The Pârâul lui Martin is a left tributary of the river Jijia in Romania. It flows into Jijia in Hilișeu-Cloșca. Its length is 10 km (6.2 mi) and its basin size is 38 km^{2} (15 sq mi).
