= Văculești =

- Commune
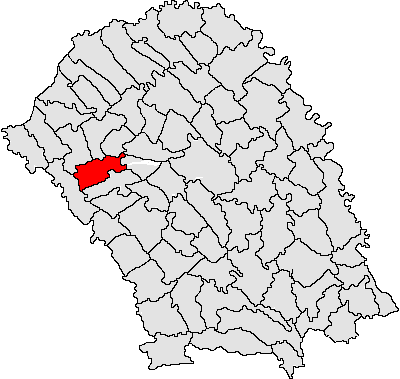
- Location in Botoșani County

- Location in Romania
- Coordinates: 47°53′N 26°25′E
- Country: Romania
- County: Botoșani
- Subdivisions: Gorovei, Saucenița, Văculești

Government
  - Mayor (2024–2028): Sorin Marian Gângă (PSD)
- Area: 60.86 km^{2} (23.50 sq mi)
- Population (2021-12-01): 1,856
  - Density: 30.50/km^{2} (78.98/sq mi)
- Time zone: UTC+02:00 (EET)
  - Summer (DST): UTC+03:00 (EEST)
- Postal code: 717445
- Area code: +40 x31
- Vehicle reg.: BT
- Website: vaculesti.ro

Văculești is a commune in Botoșani County, Western Moldavia, Romania. It is composed of three villages: Gorovei, Saucenița and Văculești.
