= Covasna (Jijia) =

- Location within Romania

Location
- Country: Romania
- Counties: Iași County
- Villages: Costuleni

Physical characteristics
- Mouth: Jijia
  - coordinates: 47.0385°N 27.8682°E
- Length: 9 km (5.6 mi)
- Basin size: 28 km^{2} (11 sq mi)

Basin features
- Progression: Jijia→ Prut→ Danube→ Black Sea

The Covasna is a right tributary of the river Jijia in eastern Romania. It discharges into the Jijia near Costuleni. Its length is 9 km (5.6 mi) and its basin size is 28 km^{2} (11 sq mi).
