= Cania =

- Commune
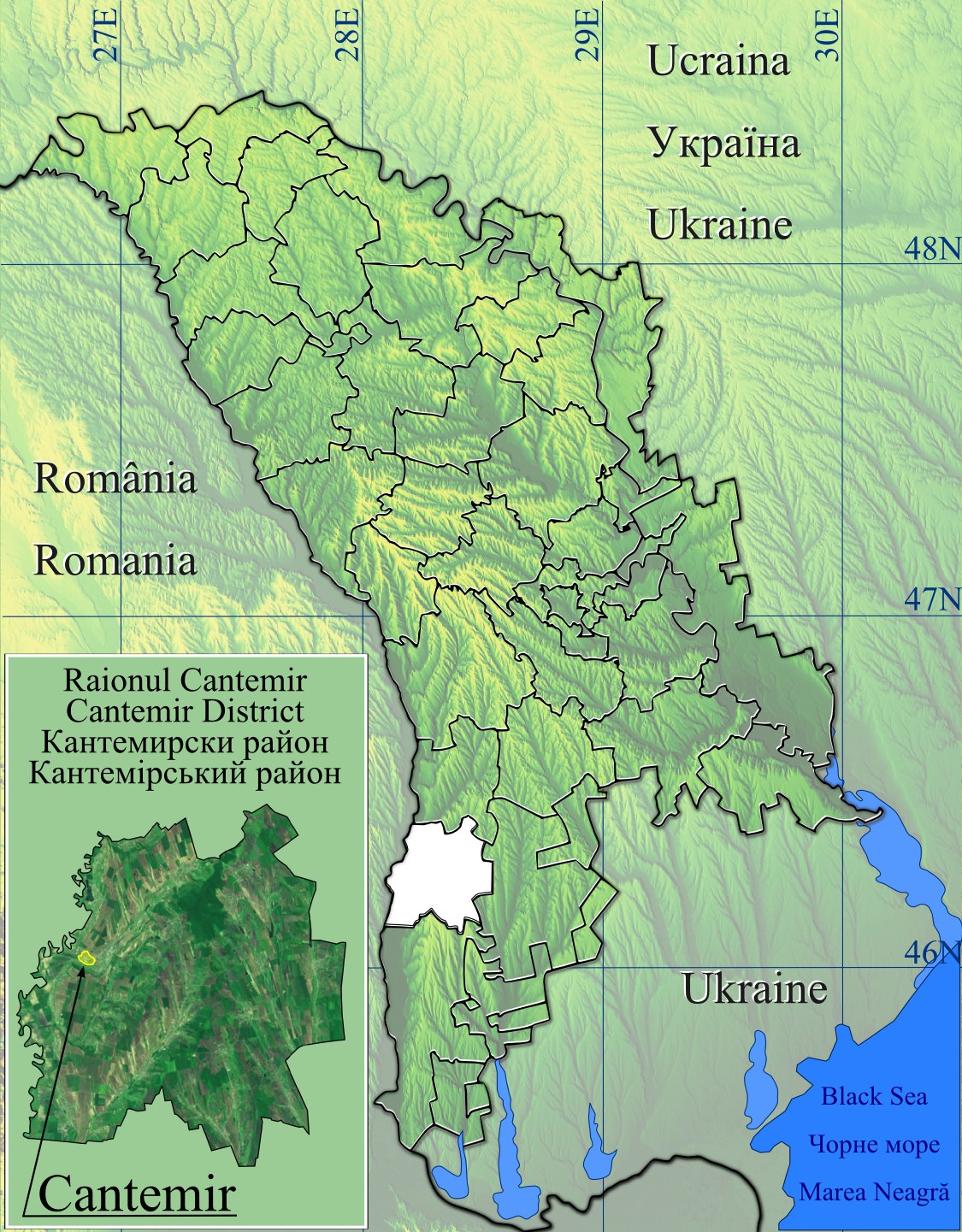
- Location within Cantemir
- Coordinates: 46°16′50″N 28°13′30″E
- Country: Moldova
- District: Cantemir

Government
  - Mayor: Manoli Anatolie, Independent
- Elevation: 46 m (151 ft)

Population (2014)
  - Total: 1,889
- Time zone: UTC+2 (EET)
  - Summer (DST): UTC+3 (EEST)
- Postal code: MD-7314

Cania is a commune in Cantemir District, Moldova. It is composed of two villages, Cania and Iepureni.
