= Comarna =

- Commune
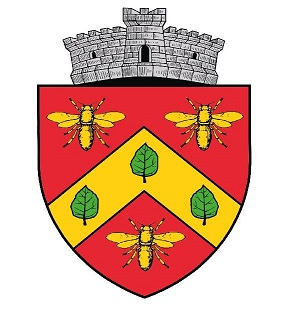
- Coat of arms

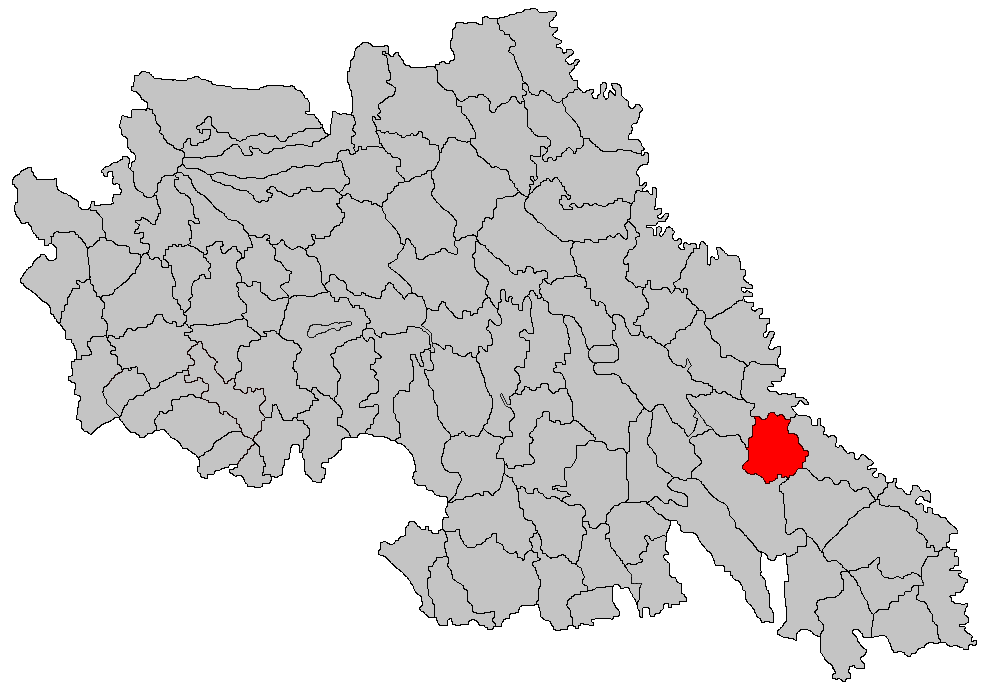
- Location in Iași County

- Location in Romania
- Coordinates: 47°3′N 27°47′E
- Country: Romania
- County: Iași
- Subdivisions: Osoi, Comarna, Curagău, Stânca

Government
  - Mayor (2024–2028): Constantin Grădinaru (PNL)
- Area: 48.06 km^{2} (18.56 sq mi)
- Elevation: 132 m (433 ft)
- Population (2021-12-01): 4,221
  - Density: 87.83/km^{2} (227.5/sq mi)
- Time zone: UTC+02:00 (EET)
  - Summer (DST): UTC+03:00 (EEST)
- Postal code: 707105
- Area code: +40 x32
- Vehicle reg.: IS
- Website: primariacomarna.ro

Comarna is a commune in Iași County, Western Moldavia, Romania. It is composed of four villages: Comarna, Curagău, Osoi and Stânca.

== Natives ==
- Radu Stroe
