= Vlădeni, Iași =

Vlădeni
- Commune
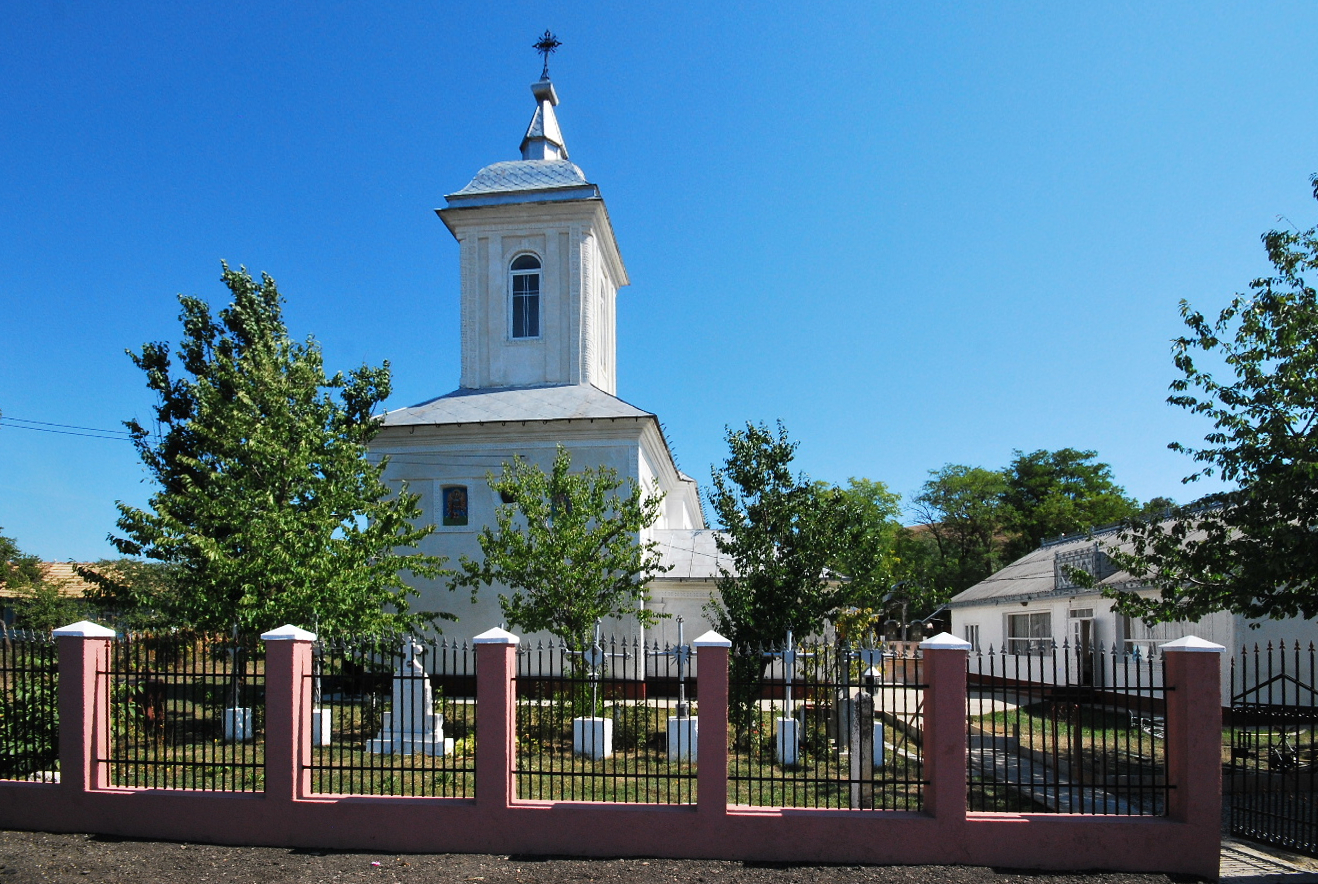
- Church of the Holy Archangels in Borșa

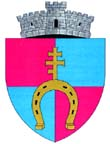
- Coat of arms

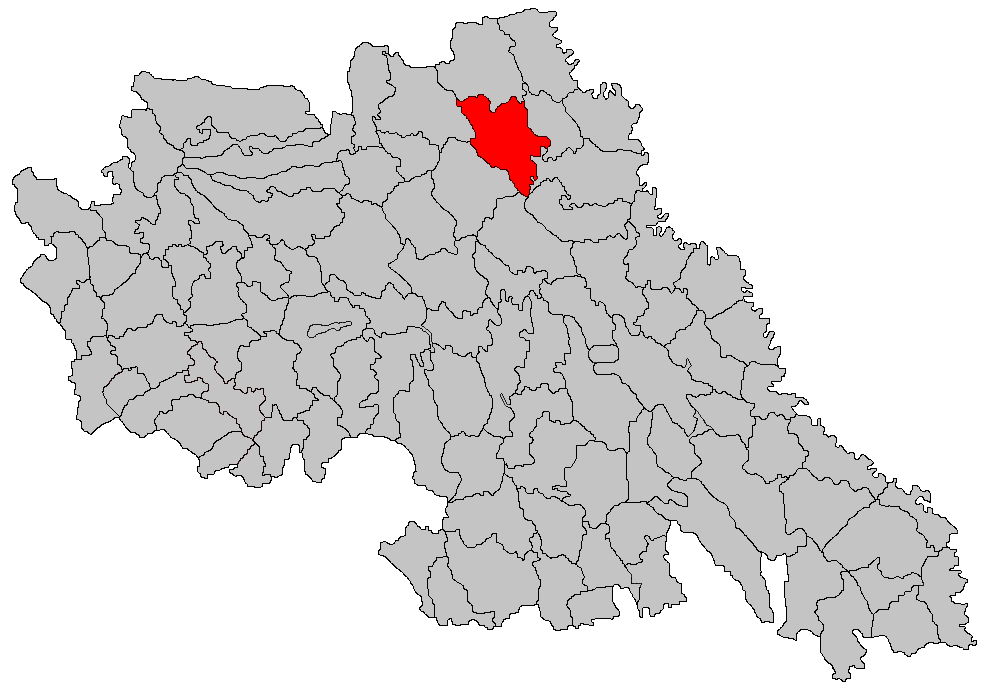
- Location in Iași County

- Location in Romania
- Coordinates: 47°25′N 27°20′E
- Country: Romania
- County: Iași

Government
  - Mayor (2024–2028): Iulian-Iustin Burdea (PNL)
- Area: 79.34 km^{2} (30.63 sq mi)
- Elevation: 48 m (157 ft)
- Population (2021-12-01): 3,486
  - Density: 43.94/km^{2} (113.8/sq mi)
- Time zone: UTC+02:00 (EET)
  - Summer (DST): UTC+03:00 (EEST)
- Postal code: 707590
- Area code: +(40) 232
- Vehicle reg.: IS
- Website: www.primariavladeniiasi.ro

Vlădeni is a commune in Iași County, Western Moldavia, Romania. It is composed of six villages: Alexandru cel Bun, Borșa, Broșteni, Iacobeni, Vâlcelele, and Vlădeni.
