= Trușești =

- Commune
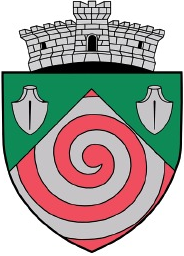
- Coat of arms

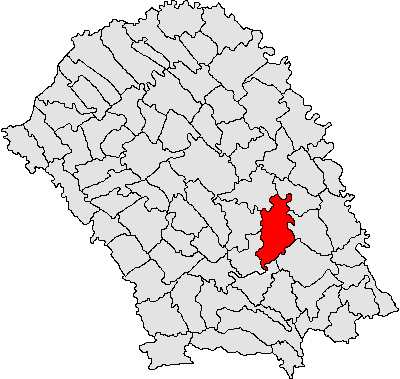
- Location in Botoșani County

- Location in Romania
- Coordinates: 47°46′N 27°01′E
- Country: Romania
- County: Botoșani
- Subdivisions: Trușești, Borolea, Moara Jorii, Sărata-Basarab, Slobozia Hănești

Government
  - Mayor (2024–2028): Mihai Puruhniuc (AUR)
- Area: 100.73 km^{2} (38.89 sq mi)
- Elevation: 80 m (260 ft)
- Population (2021-12-01): 4,621
  - Density: 45.88/km^{2} (118.8/sq mi)
- Time zone: EET/EEST (UTC+2/+3)
- Postal code: 717400
- Area code: +40 x31
- Vehicle reg.: BT
- Website: primaria-trusesti.ro

Trușești is a commune in Botoșani County, Western Moldavia, Romania. It is composed of six villages: Buhăceni, Ciritei, Drislea, Ionășeni, Păsăteni, and Trușești.

== Natives ==
- Demostene Botez
