= Șipote =

- Commune
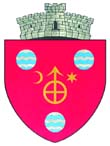
- Coat of arms

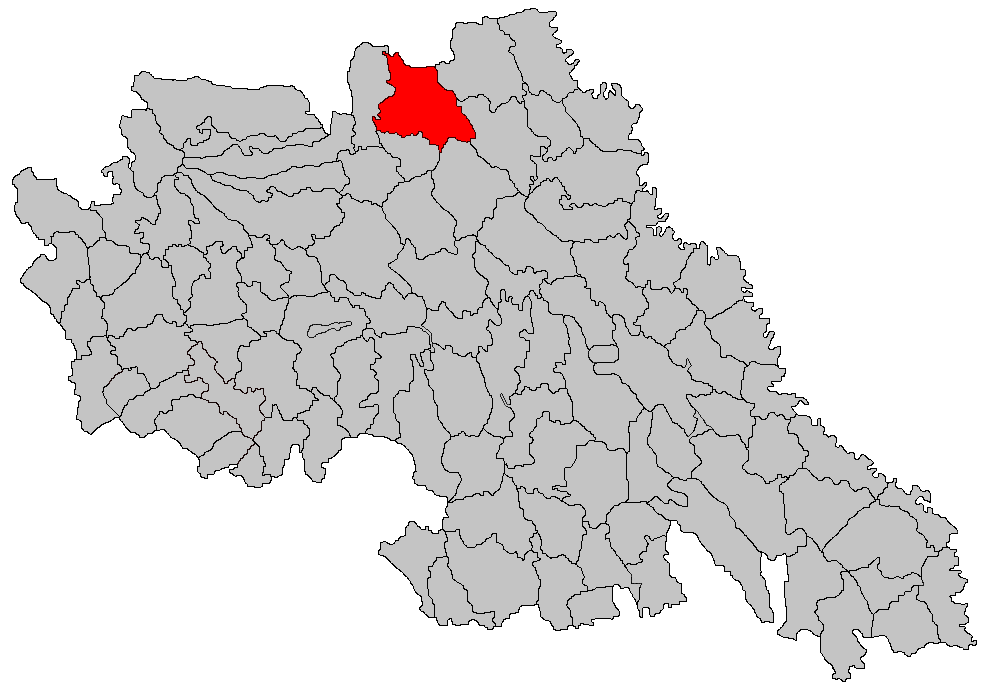
- Location in Iași County

- Location in Romania
- Coordinates: 47°28′N 27°13′E
- Country: Romania
- County: Iași
- Subdivisions: Șipote, Chișcăreni, Hălceni, Iazu Nou, Iazu Vechi, Mitoc

Government
  - Mayor (2024–2028): Constantin Puiu (PSD)
- Area: 82.85 km^{2} (31.99 sq mi)
- Elevation: 66 m (217 ft)
- Population (2021-12-01): 4,714
  - Density: 57/km^{2} (150/sq mi)
- Time zone: EET/EEST (UTC+2/+3)
- Postal code: 707485
- Area code: +40 x32
- Vehicle reg.: IS
- Website: primariasipote.ro

Șipote is a commune in Iași County, Western Moldavia, Romania. It is composed of six villages: Chișcăreni, Hălceni, Iazu Nou, Iazu Vechi, Mitoc and Șipote.
