= Coșula =

- Commune

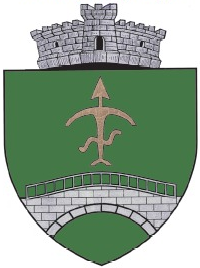
- Coat of arms

- Location in Botoșani County

- Location in Romania
- Coordinates: 47°36′N 26°48′E
- Country: Romania
- County: Botoșani
- Subdivisions: Coșula, Buda, Pădureni, Șupitca

Government
  - Mayor (2024–2028): Mircia Acatrinei (PSD)
- Area: 54.55 km^{2} (21.06 sq mi)
- Elevation: 120 m (390 ft)
- Population (2021-12-01): 3,152
  - Density: 57.78/km^{2} (149.7/sq mi)
- Time zone: UTC+02:00 (EET)
  - Summer (DST): UTC+03:00 (EEST)
- Postal code: 717063
- Area code: +40 x31
- Vehicle reg.: BT

Coșula is a commune in Botoșani County, Western Moldavia, Romania. It is composed of four villages: Buda, Coșula, Pădureni and Șupitca. It was established in 2003, when it was detached from Copălău.
