= Prăjeni =

- Commune
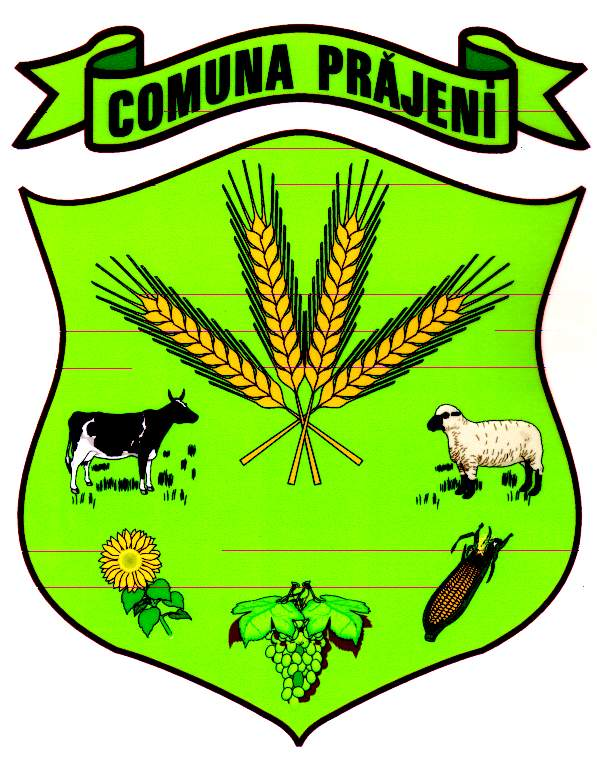
- Coat of arms

- Location in Botoșani County

- Location in Romania
- Coordinates: 47°30′N 27°01′E
- Country: Romania
- County: Botoșani
- Subdivisions: Prăjeni, Câmpeni, Lupăria, Miletin

Government
  - Mayor (2024–2028): Gheorghiță-Mihăiță Iftodi (PSD)
- Area: 35.1 km^{2} (13.6 sq mi)
- Elevation: 90 m (300 ft)
- Population (2021-12-01): 3,267
  - Density: 93/km^{2} (240/sq mi)
- Time zone: EET/EEST (UTC+2/+3)
- Postal code: 717305
- Area code: +40 x31
- Vehicle reg.: BT
- Website: primariaprajeni.ro

Prăjeni is a commune in Botoșani County, Western Moldavia, Romania. It is composed of four villages: Câmpeni, Lupăria, Miletin and Prăjeni.
