= Plugari =

- Commune
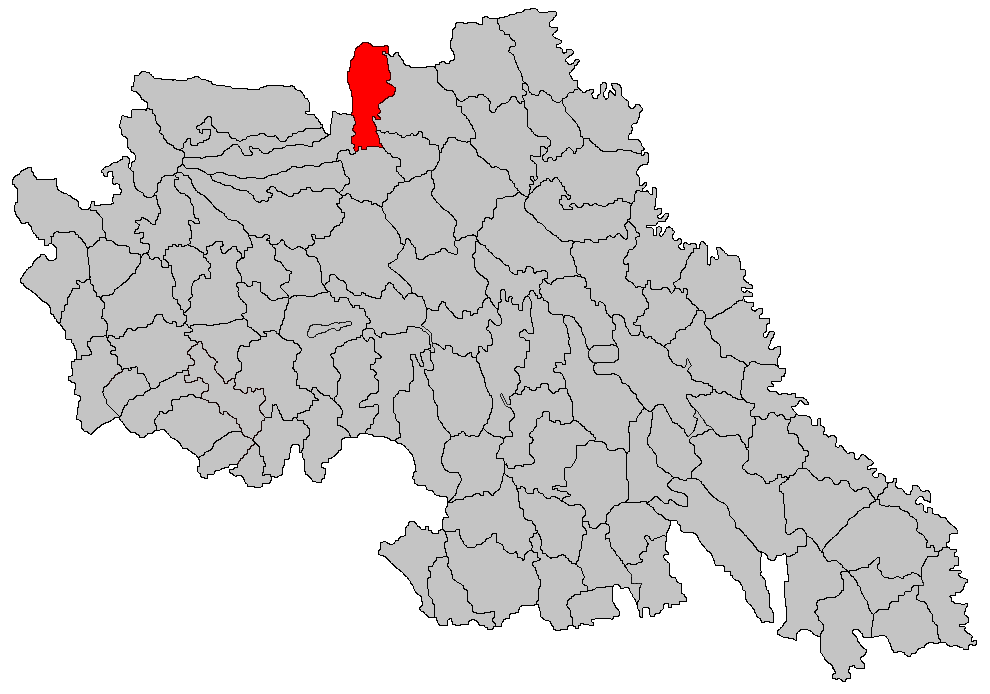
- Location in Iași County

- Location in Romania
- Coordinates: 47°29′N 27°7′E
- Country: Romania
- County: Iași
- Subdivisions: Plugari, Borosoaia, Onești

Government
  - Mayor (2024–2028): Paul Mursa (PNL)
- Area: 55.02 km^{2} (21.24 sq mi)
- Elevation: 81 m (266 ft)
- Population (2021-12-01): 3,098
  - Density: 56/km^{2} (150/sq mi)
- Time zone: EET/EEST (UTC+2/+3)
- Postal code: 707360
- Area code: +(40) x32
- Vehicle reg.: IS
- Website: comunaplugari.ro

Plugari is a commune in Iași County, Western Moldavia, Romania. It is composed of three villages: Borosoaia, Onești and Plugari.

== Natives ==
- Marilena Murariu
