= Movileni, Iași =

Movileni
- Commune
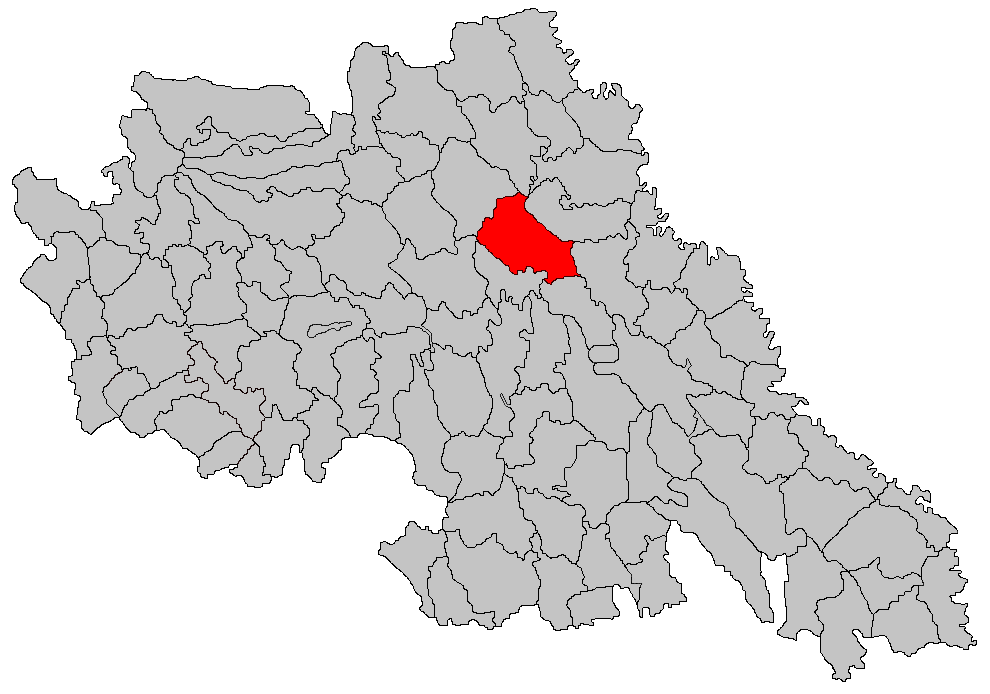
- Location in Iași County

- Location in Romania
- Coordinates: 47°20′N 27°21′E
- Country: Romania
- County: Iași
- Subdivisions: Movileni, Iepureni, Larga-Jijia, Potângeni

Government
  - Mayor (2024–2028): Dan-Constantin Hodoroabă (PNL)
- Area: 79.27 km^{2} (30.61 sq mi)
- Elevation: 75 m (246 ft)
- Population (2021-12-01): 2,895
  - Density: 37/km^{2} (95/sq mi)
- Time zone: EET/EEST (UTC+2/+3)
- Postal code: 707350
- Area code: +(40) x32
- Vehicle reg.: IS
- Website: primariamovileni.ro

Movileni is a commune in Iași County, Western Moldavia, Romania. It is composed of four villages: Iepureni, Larga-Jijia, Movileni, and Potângeni.

== Natives ==
- Constantin Corduneanu (1928–2018), Romanian-American mathematician
- Ioanel Sinescu (born 1951), physician

== Climate ==
The climate is hemiboreal.

The average temperature is 11°C. The warmest month is June, at 24°C, and the coldest is January, at −8°C.

The average rainfall is 902 mm per year. The wettest month is May, with 141 mm of rainfall, and the driest is October, with 40 mm.
