= Corlăteni, Botoșani =

Corlăteni
- Commune
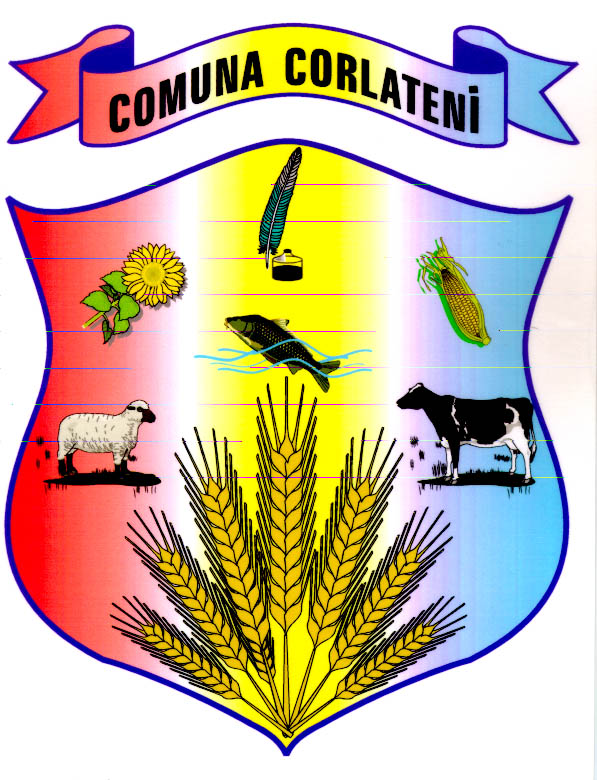
- Coat of arms

- Location in Botoșani County

- Location in Romania
- Coordinates: 47°56′N 26°33′E
- Country: Romania
- County: Botoșani
- Subdivisions: Corlăteni, Carasa, Podeni, Vlădeni

Government
  - Mayor (2024–2028): Costel Cătălin Gavril (PSD)
- Area: 55.85 km^{2} (21.56 sq mi)
- Population (2021-12-01): 1,736
  - Density: 31.08/km^{2} (80.51/sq mi)
- Time zone: UTC+02:00 (EET)
  - Summer (DST): UTC+03:00 (EEST)
- Postal code: 717075
- Area code: +40 x31
- Vehicle reg.: BT
- Website: primaria-corlateni.ro

Corlăteni is a commune in Botoșani County, Western Moldavia, Romania. It is composed of four villages: Carasa, Corlăteni, Podeni and Vlădeni.

The administrative apparatus and the commune's school, kindergarten and police station are located in Corlăteni village. The main road that passes through these villages and links the entire commune is the 291 county road (DJ 291). The main occupations of the villagers living in this area are agriculture and animal growth, especially sheep and cattle. The population of these villages has been decreasing significantly since the early 2000s because ever more villagers leave to work abroad, leaving only their parents and small children at their homes. Most of them never return, and their children, after coming of age, tend to follow their parents.
