= Andrieșeni =

- Commune
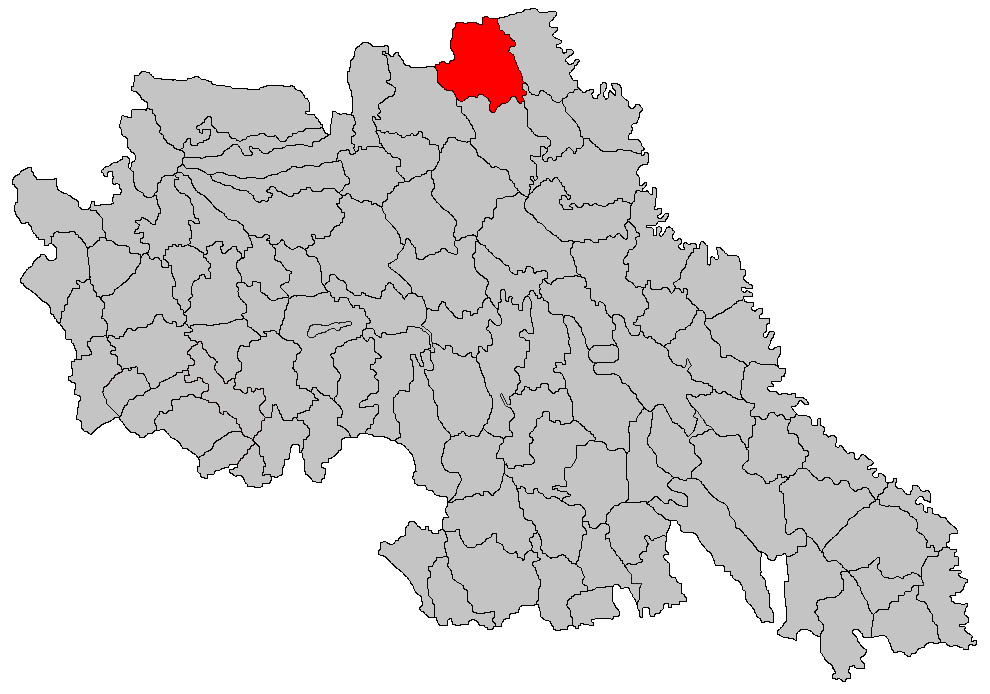
- Location in Iași County

- Location in Romania
- Coordinates: 47°32′N 27°17′E
- Country: Romania
- County: Iași
- Subdivisions: Andrieșeni, Buhăeni, Drăgănești, Fântânele, Glăvănești, Iepureni, Spineni

Government
  - Mayor (2024–2028): Mihai Ștefură (PSD)
- Area: 92.49 km^{2} (35.71 sq mi)
- Elevation: 59 m (194 ft)
- Population (2021-12-01): 3,306
  - Density: 36/km^{2} (93/sq mi)
- Time zone: EET/EEST (UTC+2/+3)
- Postal code: 707010
- Area code: +40 x32
- Vehicle reg.: IS
- Website: www.comunaandrieseni.ro

Andrieșeni is a commune in Iași County, Western Moldavia, Romania. It is composed of seven villages: Andrieșeni, Buhăeni, Drăgănești, Fântânele, Glăvănești, Iepureni and Spineni.

== Natives ==
- Pavel Coruț
