= Flămânzi =

- Town
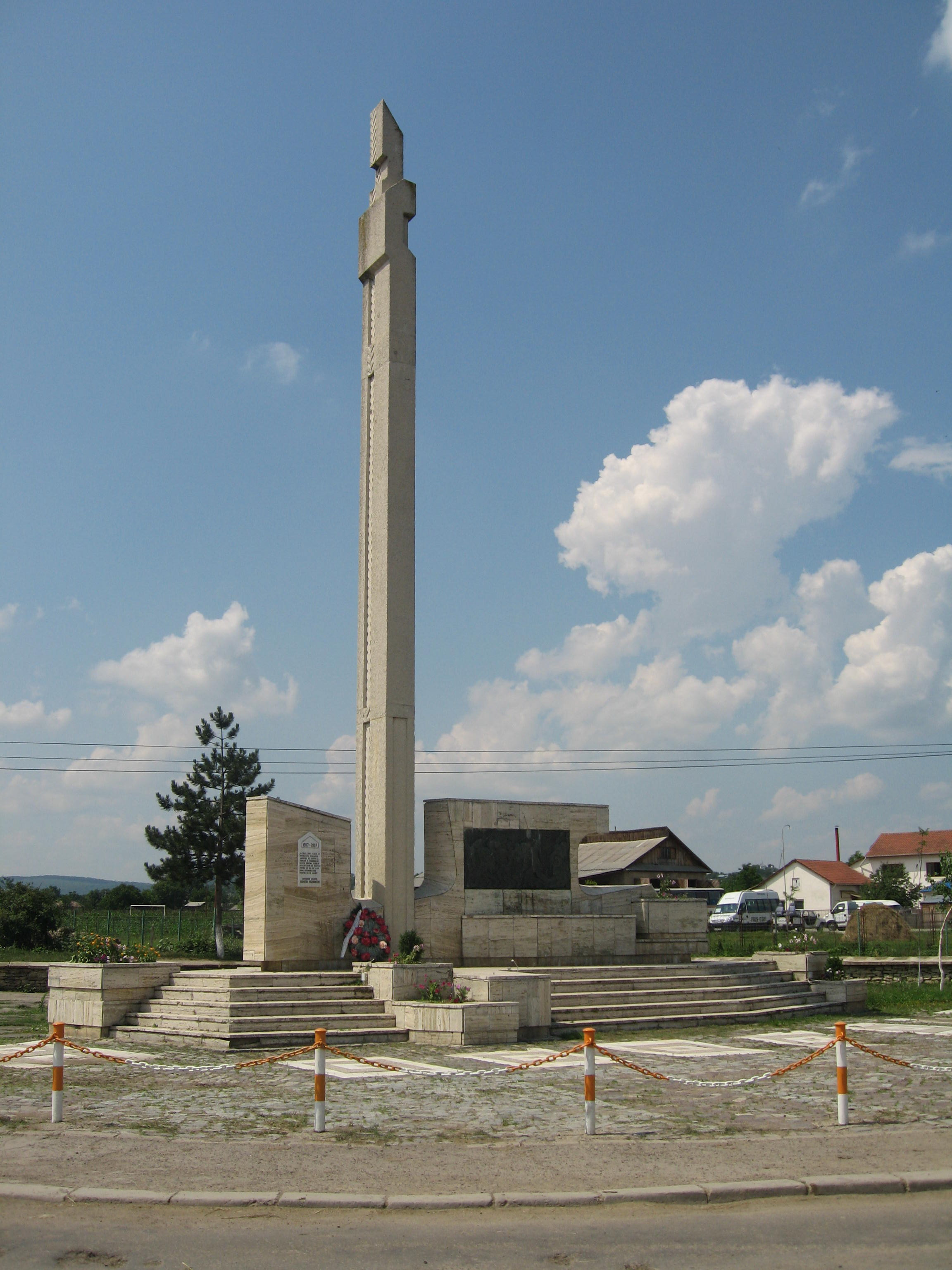

- Coat of arms

- Location in Botoșani County

- Location in Romania
- Coordinates: 47°33′N 26°54′E
- Country: Romania
- County: Botoșani
- Subdivisions: Flămânzi, Chițoveni, Nicolae Bălcescu, Poiana, Prisăcani

Government
  - Mayor (2024–2028): Dan Oloeriu (PNL)
- Area: 109.85 km^{2} (42.41 sq mi)
- Elevation: 150 m (490 ft)
- Population (2021-12-01): 10,561
  - Density: 96.140/km^{2} (249.00/sq mi)
- Time zone: UTC+02:00 (EET)
  - Summer (DST): UTC+03:00 (EEST)
- Postal code: 717155
- Area code: +40 x31
- Vehicle reg.: BT
- Website: orasul-flamanzi.ro

Flămânzi (Hungarian: Flamonza) is a town in Botoșani County, Western Moldavia, Romania. It administers five villages: Chițoveni, Flămânzi (eponymous village), Nicolae Bălcescu, Poiana, and Prisăcani.

== Local Administration ==
Flamanzi is administered by a mayor and local council composed of 17 seats. The incumbent mayor is Dan Oloeriu, a member of the National Liberal Party.

=== 2020 Local Elections ===
==== Local Council ====
Party	Votes	%	Seats
National Liberal Party	2,225	58.80	11
Social Democratic Party	602	15.90	3
USR-PLUS Alliance	327	8.64	2
Liberal Right Party	229	6.05	1
Others	401	10.6	0
Total	3,784	100	17
Source: Permanent Electoral Authority - 2020 Local Elections

=== 2024 Local Elections ===
==== Local Council ====
Party	Votes	%	Seats
National Liberal Party	3,008	74.97	14
Social Democratic Party	514	12.81	2
United Right Alliance	285	7.10	0
Alliance for the Union of Romanians	205	5.10	1
Total	4,012	100	17
Source: Permanent Electoral Authority - 2024 Local Elections

== Natives ==
- Mihai Bordeianu (born 1991), footballer
- Trifan Roman Grosu, peasant revolter

Historical population
Year	Pop.	±%
2002	11,799	—
2011	10,136	−14.1%
2021	10,561	+4.2%
Source: Census data
