= Gorban =

- Commune
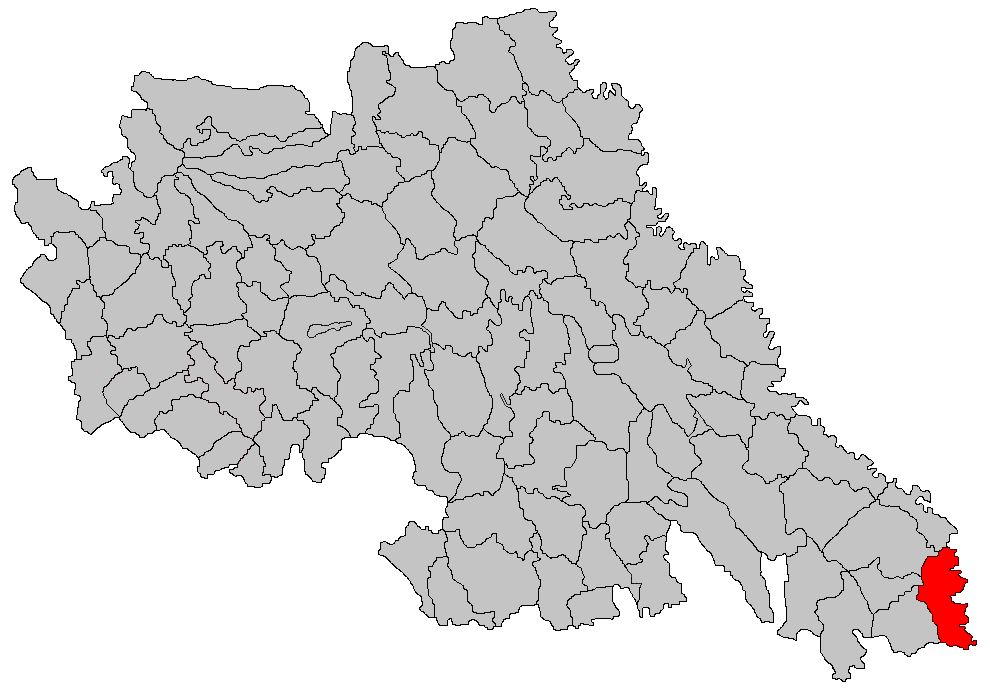
- Location in Iași County

- Location in Romania
- Coordinates: 46°52′30″N 28°4′50″E
- Country: Romania
- County: Iași
- Subdivisions: Gorban, Gura Bohotin, Podu Hagiului, Scoposeni, Zberoaia

Government
  - Mayor (2024–2028): Aurel Mitrofan (PNL)
- Area: 57.45 km^{2} (22.18 sq mi)
- Elevation: 49 m (161 ft)
- Population (2021-12-01): 2,461
  - Density: 43/km^{2} (110/sq mi)
- Time zone: EET/EEST (UTC+2/+3)
- Postal code: 707210
- Area code: +40 x32
- Vehicle reg.: IS
- Website: primariagorban.ro

Gorban is a commune in Iași County, Western Moldavia, Romania. It is composed of five villages: Gorban, Gura Bohotin, Podu Hagiului, Scoposeni and Zberoaia.
