= Costuleni, Iași =

Costuleni
- Commune
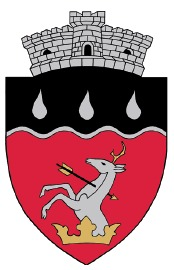
- Coat of arms

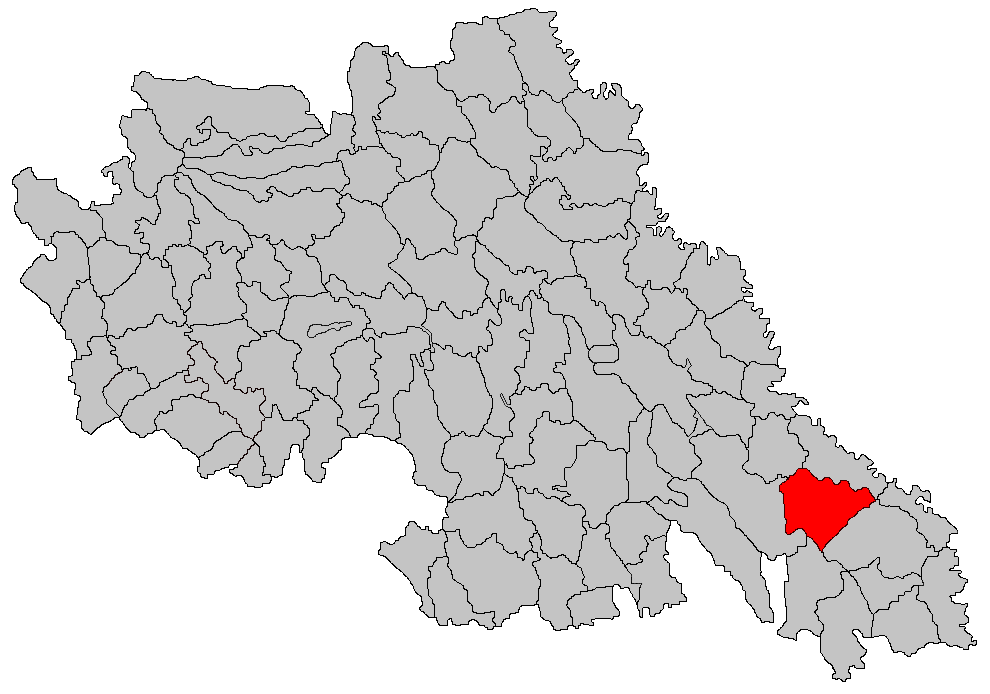
- Location in Iași County

- Location in Romania
- Coordinates: 47°2′N 27°51′E
- Country: Romania
- County: Iași
- Subdivisions: Costuleni, Covasna, Cozia, Hilița

Government
  - Mayor (2024–2028): Mirică Dodan (PNL)
- Area: 70.12 km^{2} (27.07 sq mi)
- Elevation: 37 m (121 ft)
- Population (2021-12-01): 4,080
  - Density: 58/km^{2} (150/sq mi)
- Time zone: EET/EEST (UTC+2/+3)
- Postal code: 707115
- Area code: +40 x32
- Vehicle reg.: IS
- Website: www.comunacostuleni.ro

Costuleni is a commune in Iași County, Western Moldavia, Romania. It is composed of four villages: Costuleni, Covasna, Cozia and Hilița.
