= Jijia =

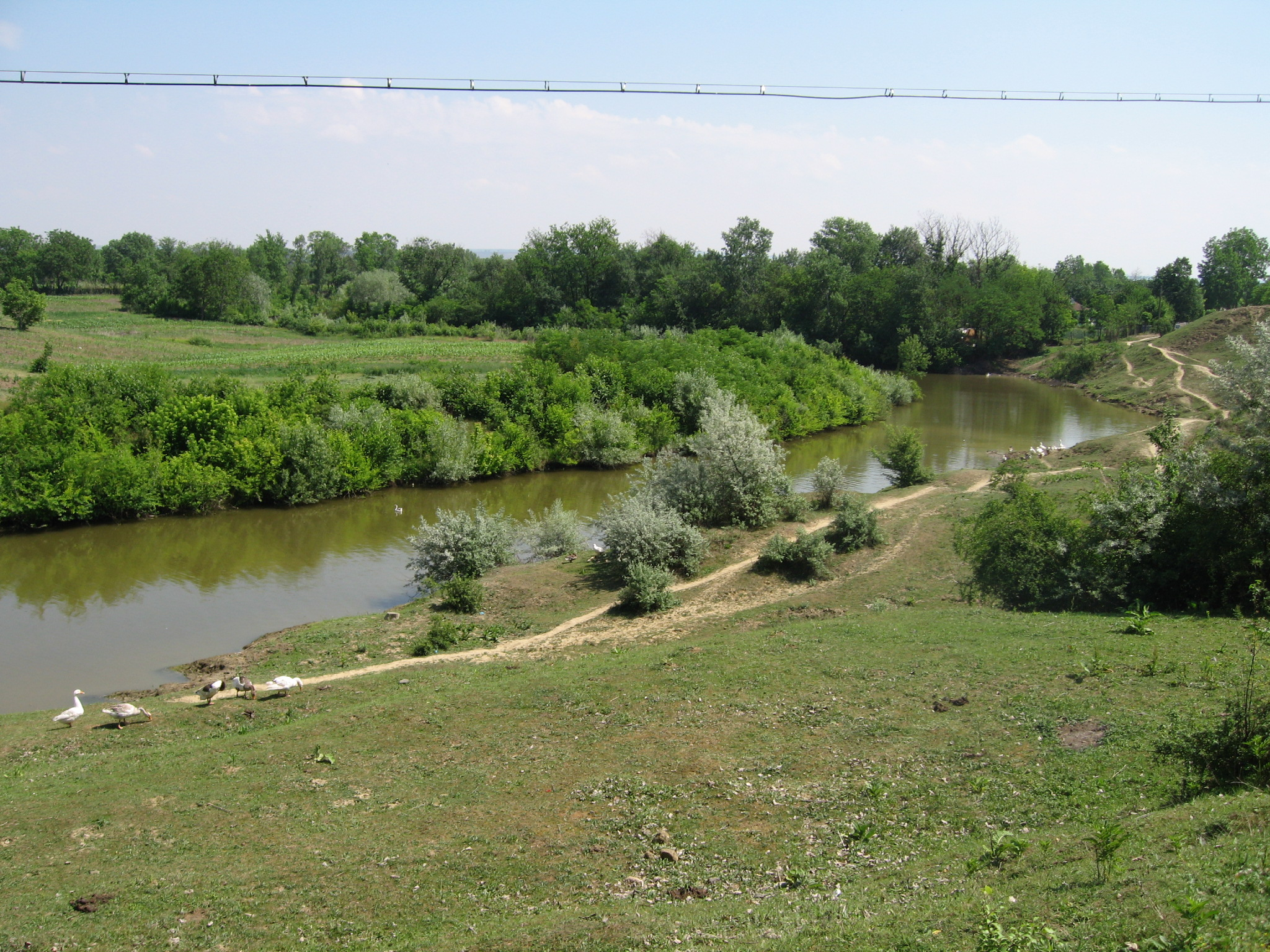

- Location within Romania

Location
- Country: Ukraine, Romania
- Counties: Botoșani, Iași
- Town: Dorohoi

Physical characteristics
- Source: Ukraine
  - elevation: 410 m (1,350 ft)
- Mouth: Prut
  - location: Gorban
  - coordinates: 46°54′12″N 28°04′58″E
- Length: 287 km (178 mi)
- Basin size: 5,770 km^{2} (2,230 sq mi)
- Discharge
  - minimum: 0.14 m^{3}/s (4.9 cu ft/s)
  - maximum: 340 m^{3}/s (12,000 cu ft/s)

Basin features
- Progression: Prut→ Danube→ Black Sea
- Tributaries
  - right: Sitna, Miletin, Bahlui

The Jijia (Romanian pronunciation: [ˈʒiʒia]) (Ukrainian: Жижія, romanized: Zhyzhiya) is a river in Ukraine and the Moldavia region of Romania, a right tributary of the Prut. It rises in Ukraine at an altitude of 410 metres, flows south in Botoșani County through the town of Dorohoi and meets the Prut in Gorban, Iași County. It has a length of 287 km (178 mi), of which 275 km in Romania, and a drainage area of about 5,770 km^{2} (2,230 sq mi), of which 5,757 km^{2} (2,223 sq mi) in Romania. Major tributaries are the rivers Sitna, Miletin and Bahlui.

== Tributaries ==
The following rivers are tributaries to the river Jijia (from source to mouth):

- Left: Tinca, Pârâul lui Martin, Bezerc, Putreda, Tălpeni, Săvescu, Ibăneasa, Ghițălăria, Buzunosu, Găinăria, Guranda, Gard, Mihăiasa, Ciornohal, Glăvănești, Iepureni, Hărbărău, Puturosul, Pop, Frasin.
- Right: Buhai, La Iazul cel Mare, Părul, Valea Iazurilor, Lunca, Drâslea, Sitna, Aluza, Miletin, Jijioara, Jirinca, Bahlui, Tamarca, Comarna, Covasna
