= Cazasu =

- Commune
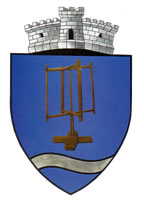
- Coat of arms

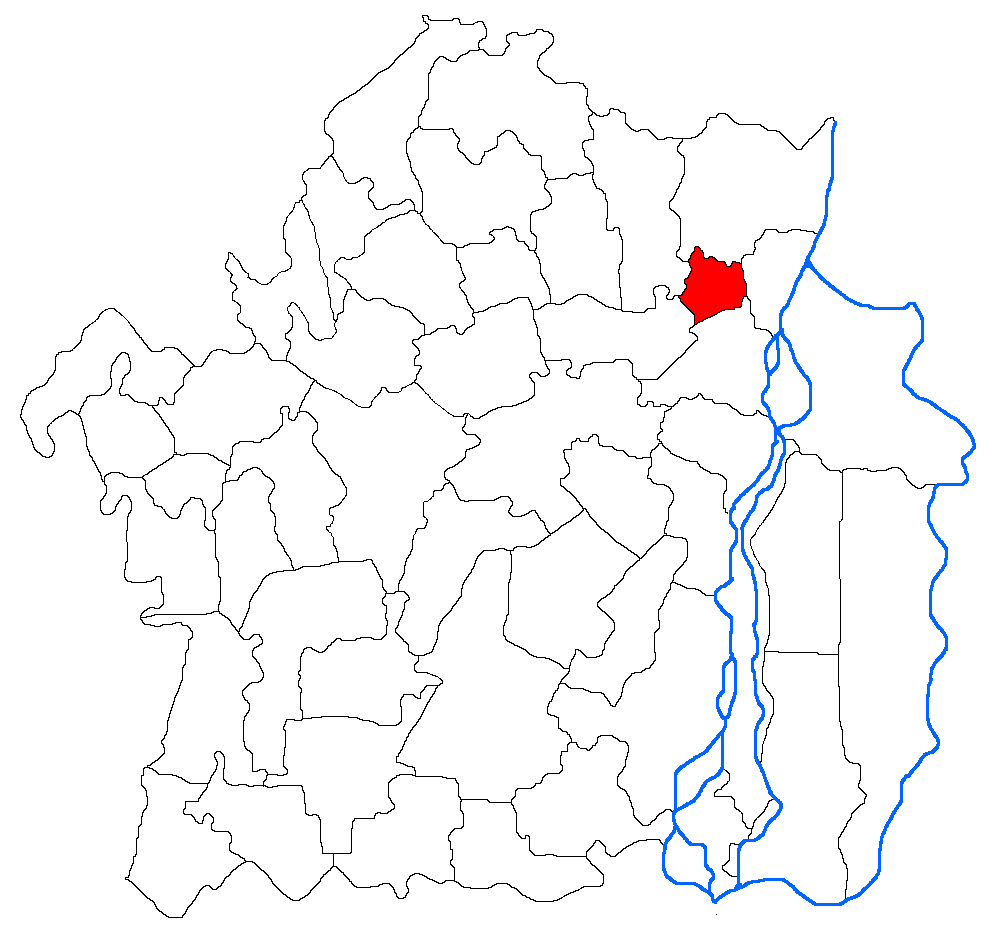
- Location in Brăila County

- Location in Romania
- Coordinates: 45°17′N 27°54′E
- Country: Romania
- County: Brăila

Government
  - Mayor (2020–2024): Elena Coadă (PNL)
- Area: 26.88 km^{2} (10.38 sq mi)
- Elevation: 13 m (43 ft)
- Population (2021-12-01): 3,611
  - Density: 130/km^{2} (350/sq mi)
- Time zone: EET/EEST (UTC+2/+3)
- Postal code: 817181
- Area code: +(40) 239
- Vehicle reg.: BR
- Website: www.cazasu.ro

Cazasu is a commune located in Brăila County, Muntenia, Romania. It consists of a single village, also named Cazasu. It was part of the Tudor Vladimirescu Commune until 2003, when it was split off to form a separate commune.
