= Tudor Vladimirescu, Brăila =

Tudor Vladimirescu
- Commune
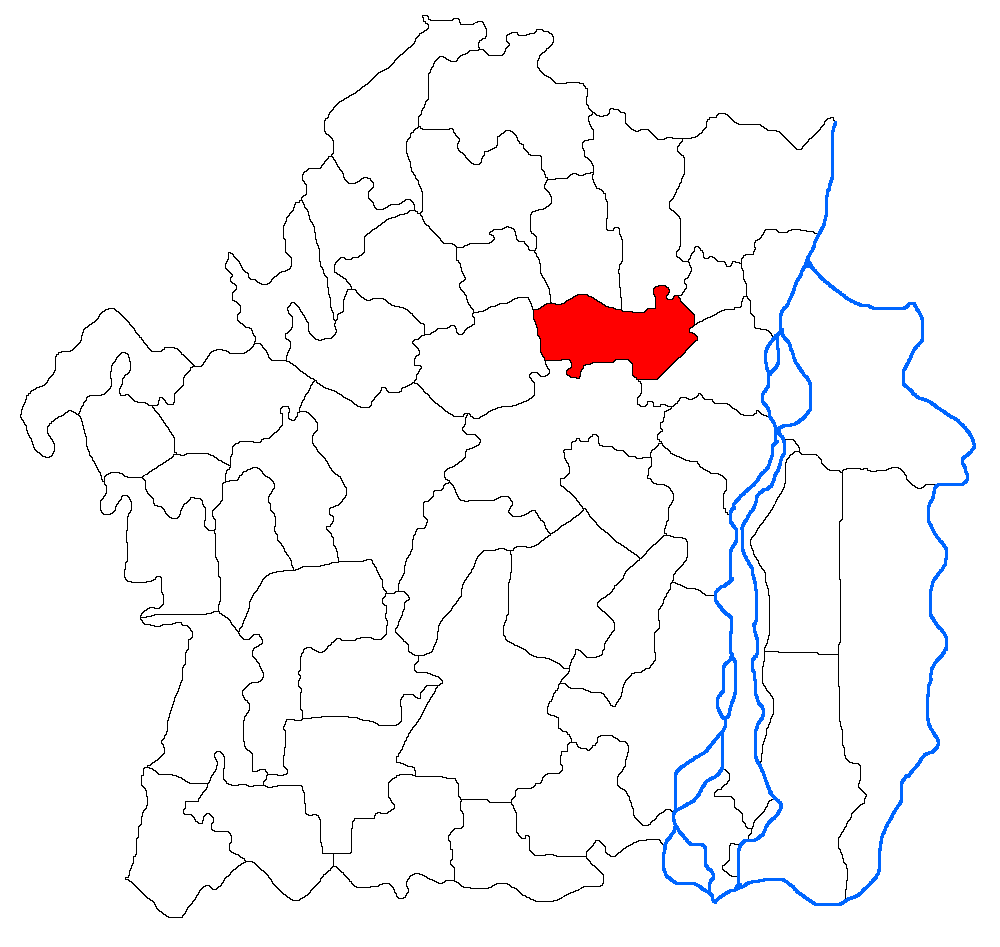
- Location in Brăila County

- Location in Romania
- Coordinates: 45°13′N 27°48′E
- Country: Romania
- County: Brăila
- Population (2021-12-01): 1,871
- Time zone: UTC+02:00 (EET)
  - Summer (DST): UTC+03:00 (EEST)
- Vehicle reg.: BR

Tudor Vladimirescu is a commune located in Brăila County, Muntenia, Romania. It is composed of three villages: Comăneasca, Scorțaru Vechi and Tudor Vladimirescu. Until 2003, it included Cazasu village, which was split off that year to form a separate commune.
