= 2012 Romanian floods =

2012 multiple floods in Romania and Bulgaria

- Date: May 16, 2012 – June 12, 2012
- Location: 16 Romanian counties, 3 Bulgarian provinces
- Deaths: 5; 2 in Bacău County; 1 in Alba County; 1 in Gorj County; 1 in Prahova County

The 2012 Romanian floods were the result of an extreme weather event that struck Romania in late May 2012. Authorities reported four deaths throughout Romania. The south-east of the country, especially Vrancea County was most affected. Also affected were the provinces of Kyustendil, Blagoevgrad and Sofia in neighbouring Bulgaria.

== History ==
Seven houses were flooded in Lacu Roșu neighborhood (Brăila). According to data from the Brăila County Department of Agriculture, torrential rain affected over 800 hectares of sunflower, corn, wheat, barley, soy, and vegetable crops between May 20 and 29. Likewise, several households were flooded in the commune of Mircea Vodă. Throughout the town of Ianca, consumers remained without electricity for two hours.

In Caraș-Severin County, 250 households were flooded. According to the authorities, 80 households in Șușca, 80 in Radimna, 89 in Prilipeț and one in Lăpușnicu Mare were affected by floods formed on slopes because of heavy rainfall. The water destroyed an electric pillar, leaving inhabitants of Șușca without electricity for three hours. Military firefighters of the 'Semenic' Inspectorate for Emergency Situations saved 20 people, including four children.

Cloudburst caused spontaneous floods in Bucharest and Ilfov and Dâmbovița counties. Several streets were flooded after sewers were overwhelmed, and many areas saw damage from hail. Several households were flooded in the commune of Pantelimon. In Dâmbovița County, more cars were damaged after wind ripped boards from the roof of an apartment block. In addition, heavy rains in the commune of Răzvad (Dâmbovița County) turned ditches and streets into rivers. Water entered the cellars of houses, household annexes, courtyards and gardens, and locals' crops were damaged.

In Mehedinți County, county road DJ607C and local road DC4 were affected by the formation of transversal and longitudinal ravines. National road DN57 was also affected, by slope glide, leading to the collapse of a masonry parapet. Over 240 consumers were left without electricity across Strehaia, Băsești, Budănești and Cracu Lung. The balance sheet of authorities shows that due to Coșuștea river overflow were flooded 100 hectares of tillage, 120 hectares of pastures in village of Corcova and three hectares of agricultural land in village of Broșteni, due to Motru river overflow.

In Neamț County, 50 households and 19 household annexes were flooded due to heavy rains in early-June. Strong winds, hailstorms and thunderstorms also produced significant damage through Neamț County.

In Prahova County, several households and institutions were flooded. In the town of Băicoi, severe weather left 18 consumers without electricity. Landslides and rockfalls also affected county road 101T and local road DC47. A six-year-old girl was taken by a stream formed by the recent precipitation.

In Vaslui County, 40 localities remained without electricity, 25 households were destroyed by water and river deposits, and 15 people were evacuated from their homes. Flash floods in the commune of Solești flash floods caused over 700,000 RON in damages to roads and houses and forced 15 to seek shelter in the Solesti Cultural House. Heavy rains affected over 40 villages in Vaslui County and people lost electricity in the communes of Vutcani and Alexandru Vlahuță. Communes of Vutcani, Bălteni, Lipovăț, Viișoara, Voinești, Laza and Bogdănești reported damage as well, especially to bridges and footbridges.

At least 10 households in the town of Mărășești and commune of Pufești (Vrancea County) were flooded due to heavy rains. On European route E85, road traffic was hampered in two points by whirling waters that rushed over road. Over 6,140 villagers in the communes of Nereju and Spulber were isolated when a 30m stretch of county road DN2M collapsed. Authorities said that it has exceeded the rate of flooding on the Zăbala River. Record rainfall of 87.5 L/m^{2} was registered in the mountains of Vrancea County.

Torrential rainfall in blocked traffic in several parts of Sofia, Bulgaria and the southern bypass road of the city was flooded. Several towns in western Bulgaria also suffered from the storm. In the town of Kyustendil, the storm uprooted eleven trees. The localities of Blagoevgrad, Sandanski, Petrich and Kresna were also affected.

== Casualties ==
Provisional data from the Ministry of Administration and Interior shows that, after heavy rainfall, were affected 89 localities in 16 counties (Bacău, Brăila, Buzău, Călărași, Caraș-Severin, Constanța, Galați, Hunedoara, Ialomița, Ilfov, Mehedinți, Neamț, Prahova, Tulcea, Vaslui and Vrancea). Military firefighters saved 37 people (24 in Bacău County and 13 in Caraș-Severin County), and other 21 were evacuated to relatives and friends or sheltered in schools or cultural houses (15 in Vaslui County, 4 in Bacău County and 2 in Tulcea County).

A total of 209 localities were flooded and another 24 isolated, and 18 household annexes were destroyed or in danger of collapse. Likewise, storms affected over 62 km of national, county and local roads as well as sections of railways, four bridges and 37 footbridges. 390 hectares of arable land and 24 hectares of pasture were flooded, and 255 fountains were clogged. Authorities reported five deaths, mostly by drowning.
