= Bogdana, Vaslui =

Bogdana
- Commune
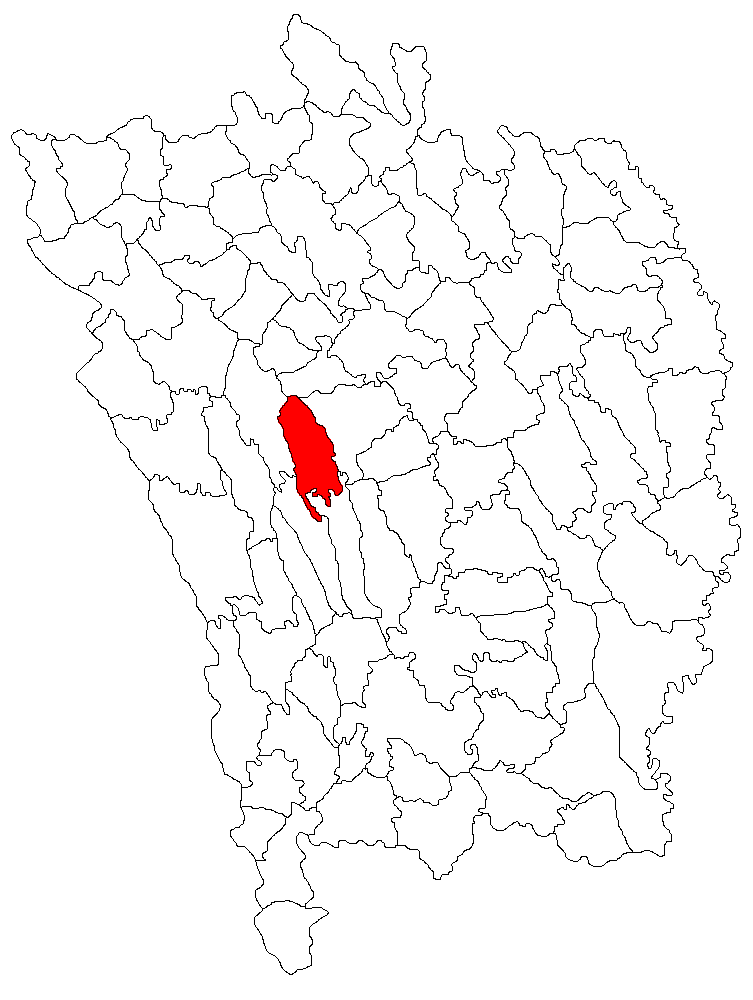
- Location in Vaslui County

- Location in Romania
- Coordinates: 46°32′N 27°37′E
- Country: Romania
- County: Vaslui
- Population (2021-12-01): 1,313
- Time zone: EET/EEST (UTC+2/+3)
- Postal code: 737075
- Vehicle reg.: VS

Bogdana is a commune in Vaslui County, Western Moldavia, Romania.

The commune of Bogdana is one of the most developed communes of Vaslui County from an agricultural and economic point of view.

Bogdana is situated in the central-west part of Vaslui county. It falls within the region of the Tutova Hills, with the hilly landscape characteristic of that zone.

On is bordered on the north by the commune Puşcaşi, on the east by the commune Lipovăț, on extreme southeast by the commune Bogdănești, on the southwest by the commune Alexandru Vlahuță, on the south by the commune Bogdănița, and on the west by the commune Poienești.

The commune is composed of nine villages: Arșița, Bogdana, Fântâna Blănarului, Găvanu, Lacu Babei, Plopeni, Similișoara, Suceveni and Verdeș. The surface area is 5,337 hectares (13,190 acres) and the population is 3125 people. The principal economic activities are agriculture and milling and processing wood.

== History ==
Bogdana traces back to a 15th-century settlement under the name of Zvastelești, at the site of the present-day village of Bogdana. A 20 October 1468 document from Stephen III of Moldavia mentions a bargain between Toader Zvasteala (after whom the village was named) and his sisters "the first living in the village of Zvastelești, but the others in the village of Sarbanești, both in Bogdana." Other nearby villages mentioned are Horjaștii, Sarbanești, and others that no longer exist. The present-day village of Suceveni dates from the 18th century, Fântâna Blănarului from 1830, Similișoara from 1845, and Lacu Babei from 1880.
