= Vaslui serial killer =

Unidentified Romanian serial killer

Details
- Victims: 4
- Span of crimes: 2000–2004
- Country: Romania
- State: Vaslui

The Vaslui serial killer (Romanian: Criminalul în serie din Vaslui) is the nickname given to an unidentified Romanian serial killer who murdered four women around Vaslui County from 2000 to 2004.

While nobody has been charged with these murders, investigators have indicated that they consider convicted murderer Cătălin Ciolpan to be the main suspect. Ciolpan, an HGV driver, was convicted of two sexually motivated murders in Austria and Germany committed in 2014 and 2016, and is currently serving two life terms for each crime.

== Murders ==
On October 12, 2000, 29-year-old Marcela Tomozei, the wife of a priest living in Crețești who also worked as a nurse at a hospital in Huși, was seen getting into the car of a stranger near Tecuci to attend a labor strike. On the next day, her body was found near a brick factory in Bârlad - she had been strangled with her own scarf, which was missing along with her jewelry.

While police were working to solve this case, a forester working near the forest in Mitoc found two human skeletons. The find was reported to the authorities, and both victims were identified shortly afterwards via their clothing. The first skeleton belonged to 30-year-old Safta Ciubotaru of Bârlad, who went missing while traveling through the city to withdraw some money from her bank account - her purse, gold wedding ring and silver necklace were stolen. The second was that of 46-year-old Maria Bîru of Răchitoasa, who went missing after going out to buy medicine for her sister. Like Ciubotaru, her purse and jewelry had been stolen, and she was last seen hitchhiking in front of the same factory. Although the circumstances indicated homicide, cause of death could not be established for either.

No further cases were linked to the murders until May 21, 2004, when 29-year-old Mioara Anuţa Manea was reported missing. She had gone out to visit her parents in Șișcani, and was reportedly seen hitchhiking near Vaslui. A week later, a shepherd found Manea's body in a forest near Tătărăni. She had been hit repeatedly in the face and her purse had been stolen, but unlike previous victims, her jewelry had been left behind.

=== Investigation ===
In the following years, the cases were handed over to different prosecutors, all of whom had differing opinions on whether the cases were related. Police Commissioner Constatin Bărbieru, who retired in 2007, stated in an interview that he believed all four were murdered by the same killer, while his successor Ovidiu Berinde claimed that he believed only Tomozei and Manea were killed by the same killer. However, Berinde would also state that he was not completely aware of all the facts of the case.

The Prosecutor's Office and the Romanian Police were heavily criticized for their handling of the case, with frequent accusations of negligence and misconduct on the investigating officers' part. One allegation claimed that multiple witnesses had seen Tomozei enter a blue Dacia Pick-Up driven by an unknown man, while others said that they had seen her in the back of a red variant of the same car, unable to tell whether she was still alive. When the driver spotted them, he veered into the nearby woods, where the skeletonized remains were found months later.

These reports were dismissed by investigators, supposedly because they considered the witnesses to have been in a state of intoxication. However, an examination of the road where they had seen the car revealed tire tracks belonging to a Dacia had recently passed by there, suggesting that the testimony might have been truthful.

=== Complaints from family members ===
In 2017, Liviu Bîru - the son of victim Maria Bîru - gave an interview to Observator News in which he revealed that his mother's body had not been returned to the family for burial. According to him, her body was sent to the National Institute of Forensic Medicine "Mina Minovici" in Bucharest so additional tests could be carried out, but the coroners never returned it.

== New developments and prime suspect ==
Nothing new emerged regarding the murders until 2017, following the arrest of 41-year-old HGV driver Cătălin Ciolpan for two unrelated murders committed in Austria and Germany, respectively. His first victim was 20-year-old French student Lucile Klobut, who was sexually assaulted and beaten to death with a metal bar in Kufstein, Austria on January 12, 2014. The other victim was 27-year-old Carolin Gruber, who was reported missing from Endingen am Kaiserstuhl, Germany, on November 6, 2016. Her body was found four days later, having been sexually assaulted and murdered in a similar manner to Klobut.

Evidence gathered from the crime scenes and detective work eventually led investigators to Ciolpan, who was arrested on June 2 at his workplace. He denied the charges, but was nonetheless tried, convicted and sentenced to life imprisonment in both cases. His final appeal was denied by a German court in 2021, ensuring that he will remain behind bars for the remainder of his life.

Due to the similarities they exhibited to the crimes in Vaslui, various news agencies have delved into his past in an attempt to connect him to the crimes. He lived in the area at the time of the crimes, drove a car similar to the one reported by witnesses and had even been charged with the attempted murder of a prostitute in Iași in 2005, but was released due to a lack of evidence for a conviction.

However, as of February 2025, he has not been charged with the Vaslui crimes, all of which remain unsolved.

== See also ==
- List of serial killers by country
