= Satu Nou =

Satu Nou (meaning "new village" in Romanian) may refer to several villages in Romania:

- Satu Nou, a village in Mișca Commune, Arad County
- Satu Nou, a village in Ungheni Commune, Argeș County
- Satu Nou, a village in Colonești Commune, Bacău County
- Satu Nou, a village in Lipova Commune, Bacău County
- Satu Nou, the former name of Nicolae Bălcescu Commune, Bacău County
- Satu Nou, a village in Oncești Commune, Bacău County
- Satu Nou, a village in Pârgărești Commune, Bacău County
- Satu Nou, a village in Parincea Commune, Bacău County
- Satu Nou, a village in Urechești Commune, Bacău County
- Satu Nou, a village in Tămășeu Commune, Bihor County
- Satu Nou, a village in Cetate Commune, Bistrița-Năsăud County
- Satu Nou, a village in Hălchiu Commune, Brașov County
- Satu Nou, a village in Glodeanu-Siliștea Commune, Buzău County
- Satu Nou, a village in Mihăilești Commune, Buzău County
- Satu Nou, a village in Ileana Commune, Călărași County
- Satu Nou, a village in Mircea Vodă Commune, Constanța County
- Satu Nou, a village in Oltina Commune, Constanța County
- Satu Nou, a village in Corbii Mari Commune, Dâmbovița County
- Satu Nou, a village in Cosmești Commune, Galați County
- Satu Nou, a village in Răsuceni Commune, Giurgiu County
- Satu Nou, a village in Căpreni Commune, Gorj County
- Satu Nou, a village in Ocland Commune, Harghita County
- Gârciu, a village in Racu Commune, Harghita County, called Satu Nou from 1964 to 2011
- Satu Nou, a village in Belcești Commune, Iași County
- Satu Nou, a village in Șcheia Commune, Iași County
- Satu Nou, a village in Schitu Duca Commune, Iași County
- Satu Nou, a village in Sirețel Commune, Iași County
- Satu Nou, a village in Punghina Commune, Mehedinți County
- Satu Nou, a village in Gheorghe Doja Commune, Mureș County
- Satu Nou, a village in Sânpetru de Câmpie Commune, Mureș County
- Satu Nou, a village in Grădinari Commune, Olt County
- Satu Nou, a village in Gura Padinii Commune, Olt County
- Satu Nou, a village in Orlea Commune, Olt County
- Satu Nou, a village in Baba Ana Commune, Prahova County
- Satu Nou, a village in Lipănești Commune, Prahova County
- Satu Nou, a village in Didești Commune, Teleorman County
- Satu Nou, a village in Mihai Bravu Commune, Tulcea County
- Satu Nou, a village in Banca Commune, Vaslui County
- Satu Nou, a village in Berezeni Commune, Vaslui County
- Satu Nou, a village in Crețești Commune, Vaslui County
- Satu Nou, a village in Muntenii de Sus Commune, Vaslui County
- Satu Nou, a village in Pochidia Commune, Vaslui County
- Satu Nou, a village in Solești Commune, Vaslui County
- Satu Nou, a village in Panciu Town, Vrancea County
- Satu Nou, a village in Ciorăști Commune, Vrancea County
- Satu Nou de Jos, a village in Groși Commune, Maramureș County

and to:

- Dacian fortress of Satu Nou, an archaeological site in Constanța County, Romania
- Satul Nou, a commune in Cimișlia district, Moldova
- Novosilske, Odesa Oblast, a village in Ukraine known as Satu-Nou in Romanian
- Banatsko Novo Selo, a village in Serbia known as Satu Nou in Romanian
