= Miclești =

Micleşti may refer to:

- Micleşti, a commune in Criuleni district, Moldova
- Micleşti, a commune in Vaslui County, Romania
- Micleşti, a village in Banca Commune, Vaslui County, Romania

== See also ==
- Miclea (surname)
