= Leoști =

Leoşti may refer to several villages in Romania:

- Leoşti, a village in Pădureni Commune, Vaslui County
- Leoşti, a village in Tătărăni Commune, Vaslui County
