= Ghermănești =

Ghermăneşti may refer to several villages in Romania:

- Ghermăneşti, a village in Snagov Commune, Ilfov County
- Ghermăneşti, a village in Banca Commune, Vaslui County
- Ghermăneşti, a village in Drânceni Commune, Vaslui County

and a village in Moldova:

- Ghermăneşti, a village in Suhuluceni Commune, Teleneşti district
