= Constantin Tănase =

Romanian actor and writer

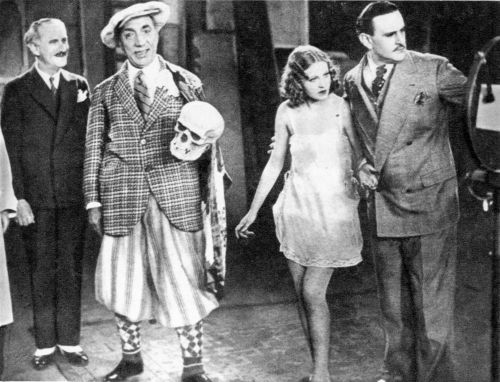
Constantin Tănase (second from left) starring in Visul lui Tănase (Tănase's Dream), 1932

Constantin Tănase (Romanian pronunciation: [konstanˈtin təˈnase]; 5 July 1880 – 29 August 1945) was a Romanian actor and writer for stage, a key figure in the revue style of theater in Romania.

== Life ==
He was born into a working-class family living in a peasant house in Vaslui, Romania. An adequate but unexceptional student (although he did apparently learn good German), his first exposure to the stage was by attending plays at "Pârjoala" garden, where he saw popular theater, including actors such as Zaharia Burienescu and I.D. Ionescu. This inspired him to start an amateur theater group among his friends; they worked up scenes from the plays Meșterul Manole, Căpitanul Valter Mărăcineanu, and Constantin Brâncoveanu; their closest thing to a stage was a barn.

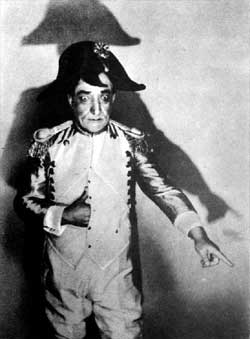
Constantin Tănase playing Napoleon

His first professional experience as an actor was in the Yiddish-language theater troupe of Mordechai Segălescu: they were short an actor for a performance in Vaslui and drafted the youthful Tănase. In 1896 he completed gymnasium. Despite his wish to become an actor, at his parents behest he enrolled in the Military School at Iași, but his rebellious behavior there quickly got him booted out. He headed to Brăila, where he briefly attended the Nicolae Bălcescu High School, but after a few weeks he dropped out due to lack of funds.

In Brăila he met the schoolteacher and writer Ion Adam, who suggested that the 18-year-old Tănase take over his teaching post in Cursești, Rahova, since Adam was headed to take some courses in Belgium. He didn't do badly at the job, but hit it off badly with the headmaster and some of the other teachers. With Adam's support, he got another teaching job at Hârșoveni, Poienești, where poet Alexandru Vlahuță also taught. Tănase promptly developed his own style of teaching, bringing music and gymnastics to a central role, which drew new students to the school. He also involved his students' parents through field trips which he used to teach history and geography. He soon became a generally beloved local figure, but apparently the local notary and certain lawyers disapproved of him and his methods and managed to have him fired.

Out of work, he headed for Bucharest on October 14, 1899, where he volunteered to join a military regiment, the 1st Engineer Regiment (Regimentul 1 Geniu). After his military service, he worked in theater, and in 1917, he married Virginia Niculescu.

In Bucharest in 1919, he founded the theater troupe "Cărăbuș" (meaning cockchafer). Over the course of 20 years, he would establish a tradition of humorous cabaret/revue theater that still continues in Romania today, most notably at the "Constantin Tănase" Revue Theatre, the former home of "Cărăbuș" at 33-35 Calea Victoriei in the heart of Bucharest. At "Cărăbuș", Tănase launched the careers of numerous performers, notably Maria Tănase and Horia Șerbănescu. "Cărăbuș" frequently toured Romania and on at least one occasion toured Turkey. Tănase himself also performed in Paris.

According to at least one source, he also founded 3 schools for children and a church.

=== Death ===
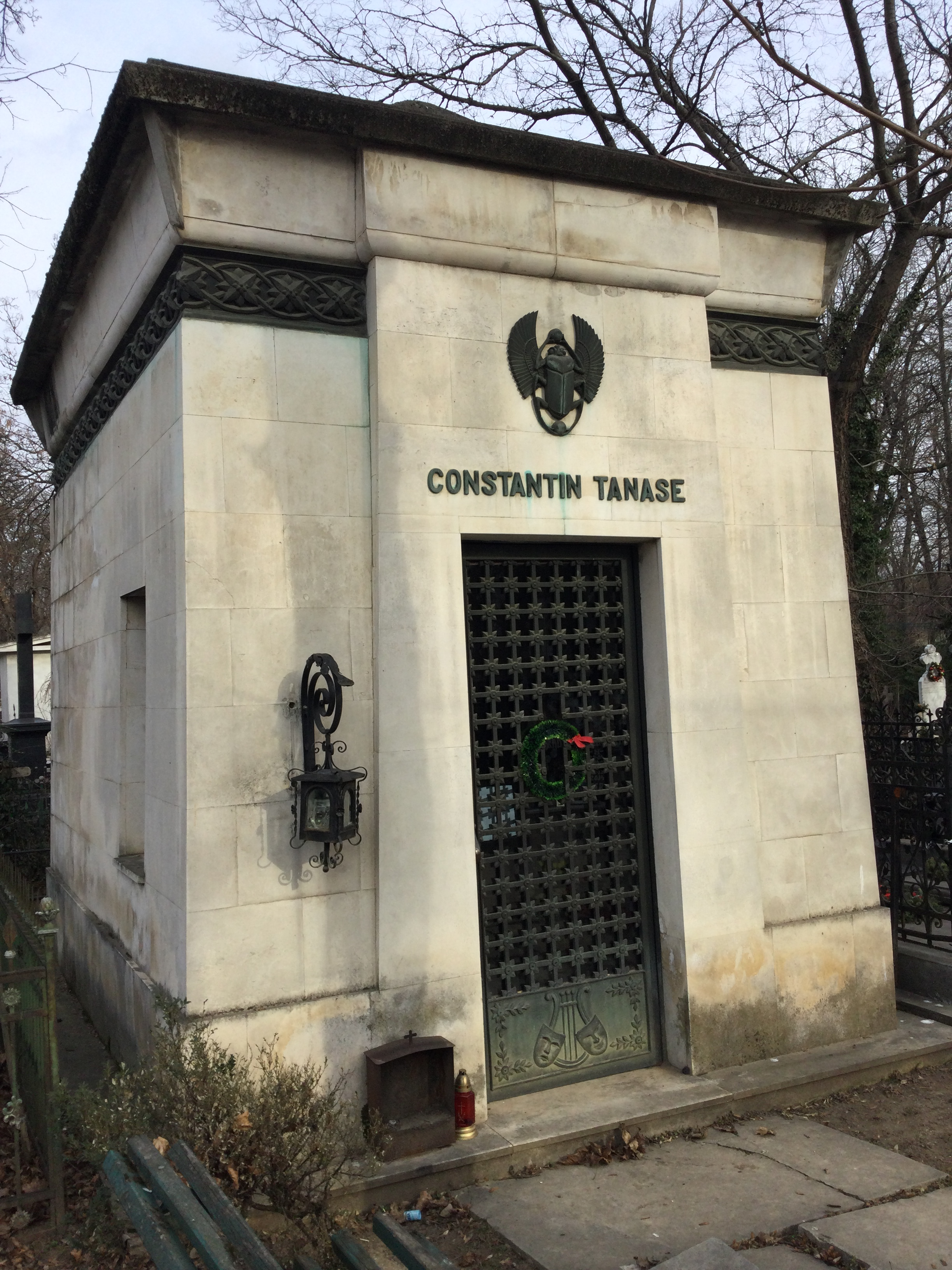
Grave of Constantin Tănase at Bellu Cemetery

According to the official account, he died of complications from a tonsillitis on August 29, 1945, in Bucharest.

However, it is rumored that he was killed by the invading Red Army, as reported in the following account. Tănase was still performing in Bucharest a year after the arrival of the Russians, and was killed for satirizing the Red Army soldiers' habit of "requisitioning" all personal property in sight, in particular of taking people's watches, demanding them by saying, "Davai ceas" (davai – Russian for "Give me", and ceas – Romanian for "watch"). Tănase made up a verse:

Rău era cu "der, die, das"
Da-i mai rău cu "davai ceas"
De la Nistru pân' la Don
Davai ceas, davai palton
Davai ceas, davai moșie
Harașo tovărășie

It was bad with "der, die, das"
But it's worse with "davai ceas"
From the Dniester to the Don
Davai watch, davai overcoat
Davai watch, davai land
Harașo comradeship

Another variant of these verses in loose translation:

It was bad with "der, die, das"
But it's worse with "davai ceas"
From the Dniester to the Don
Davai watch, coat and long-johns,
You can forego your ownership,
Harașo comradeship

After several performances he was arrested, threatened with death, and told not to do the sketch again. However, Tănase was not a man to be intimidated. At the next performance, he came on stage in a giant overcoat, with his arms festooned in watches. The audience applauded wildly as he simply stood there. Then he opened the overcoat, revealing a pendulum clock. Pointing to it, he said "El tic, eu tac, el tic, eu tac" (punning on tic-tac, the Romanian equivalent of "tick-tock", but also meaning "It ticks, I am silent, it ticks, I am silent"). Two days later he was dead.

He is buried in Bellu Cemetery, in Bucharest. Streets in Sector 2 of Bucharest and in Oradea are named after him.

== Works ==
Tănase's theater was often political and avant garde. Simona Pop quotes some lines from a song or his as typical:

În țara asta, țara pâinii
Să aibă pâine până și câinii
Guvernul nostru ne obligă
S-avem o zi de mămăligă
Lor ce le pasă cum e trăiul
Scumpiră trenul și tramvaiul
Scumpiră tot, la cataramă
Până și pâinea și tutunul
Și când înjuri pe șleau de mamă
Ei, cică, eu fac pe nebunul.

In this land, the land of bread
Even the dogs should eat bread
Our government obliges us
To have a day of mămăligă
What do they care how good the living is?
Expensive trains and trams
Expensive everything, to the limit
Even bread and tobacco
And when I openly curse their mother
They claim I'm playing the fool.

Teoria mea-i uşoară
Toată viața e o scară
Care, pe rând, ca și la moară
Toți o urcă și-o coboară".

My theory is easy
All life is a staircase
Which, by turn, just like at a mill
Everyone climbs and descends.

== Works about Tănase ==
The 1975 film Actorul şi sălbaticii ("The Actor and the Savages") starred Toma Caragiu (who died soon afterwards in the 1977 Bucharest earthquake) as "Caratase" – a mixture of Caragiu and Tănase and a transparent allusion to Tănase. However, even with Romania's increased independence from the Soviet Union, it was politically impossible to show the Red Army as responsible for his death; in the screenplay, only the conflict with the Iron Guard is illustrated, repeatedly irritating them with antifascist satire. His death is caused by a heart attack.

== Quotations ==
"Ideals are like stars: you can't actually reach them, but you can orient yourself by them."

== Filmography ==
- Peripițiile călătoriei lui Rigadin de la Paris la București (1924, silent, The Adventures of Rigadin During His Travel from Paris to Bucharest
- Visul lui Tănase (1932, Tănase's Dream)
- Răbdare Tănase! (1943, Have patience, Tănase!)

== Legacy ==
From the time Tănase moved to Bucharest, his only visit to Vaslui and to his parents was on a tour by his theater troupe. Nonetheless, Vaslui has named one Casa de Cultură ("House of Culture") after him (one of two such institutions in Vaslui), his personal archives and many of his possessions now reside in the Vaslui county museum, and since 1970 Vaslui has memorialized him with a theater festival under the leadership of another native son of Vaslui, Valentin Silvestru, which at least since 1980 has drawn comedians from all over Romania. The festival is now also an international festival of caricature.
