= Igești =

Igești may refer to several villages in Romania:

- Igești, a village in Blăgești Commune, Vaslui County
- Igești, a village in Țifești Commune, Vrancea County

and to:

- Igești, the Romanian name for Yizhivtsi Commune, Storozhynets Raion, Ukraine
