= Gheorghe Ghibănescu =

Romanian historian and philologist

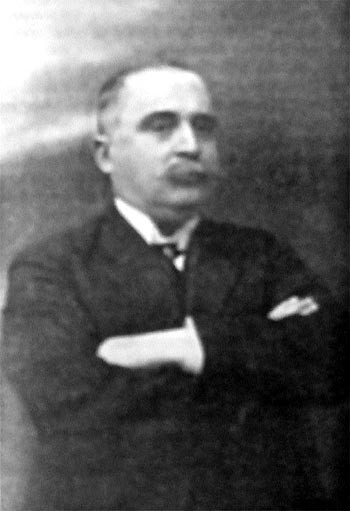
Gheorghe Ghibănescu

Gheorghe Ghibănescu (29 September 1864 – 4 July 1936) was a Romanian historian and philologist.

Born in Gugești, Vaslui County, he attended the junior seminary in Huși from 1875 to 1879, followed by the senior seminary at the Socola Monastery in Iași from 1879 to 1882. After finishing his secondary education, he entered the Faculty of Literature and Philosophy at the Alexandru Ioan Cuza University, where he studied history, philosophy, philology and pedagogy. In 1885, he won a competition for a teaching post at the normal school in Bârlad, marking the beginning of his career as teacher, historian and newspaper writer. While at Bârlad, he published two works that proved significant during his later research: Originile Hușilor ("The Origins of Huși", 1888) and Grafica chirilică la români ("The Romanian Cyrillic Alphabet", 1889). In 1889, he was transferred to the Vasile Lupu Normal School in Iași, where he undertook extensive research alongside his teaching duties. He authored grammar textbooks as well as monographs on the churches of Iași and on historical personalities such as Stephen the Great, Vlad the Impaler and Vlad the Monk. In 1905, in recognition of his work, he was elected a corresponding member of the Romanian Academy. He died in 1936 and was buried in Eternitatea cemetery.
