= Cepești =

Cepeşti may refer to several villages in Romania:

- Cepeşti, a village in Cungrea Commune, Olt County
- Cepeşti, a village in Bogdănița Commune, Vaslui County
