= Negrele =

Negrele may refer to:

- Negrele River, Romania
- Oșești, a commune in Vaslui County, Romania
