= Mânjești =

Mânjești may refer to:

- Mânjești, a village in Mogoșești Commune, Iași County, Romania
- Mânjești, a village in Muntenii de Jos Commune, Vaslui County, Romania
