= Blăgești =

Blăgești may refer to several places in Romania:

- Blăgești, Bacău, a commune in Bacău County
- Blăgești, Vaslui, a commune in Vaslui County
- Blăgești, a village administered by Pașcani town, Iași County
