= Mânzătești =

Mânzăteşti may refer to several places in Romania:

- Mânzătești, a village in Ungheni Commune, Iași County
- Mânzătești, a village in Mălușteni Commune, Vaslui County
