= Gănești (disambiguation) =

Gănești may refer to several places in Romania:

- Gănești, a commune in Mureș County
- Gănești, a village in Bistra Commune, Alba County
- Gănești, a village in Pietroșani Commune, Argeș County
- Gănești, a village in Cavadinești Commune, Galați County
- Gănești, a village in Ion Neculce Commune, Iași County
- Gănești, a village in Boțești Commune, Vaslui County
- Gănești, a village in Lăcusteni Commune, Vâlcea County
