= Vinderei =

- Commune
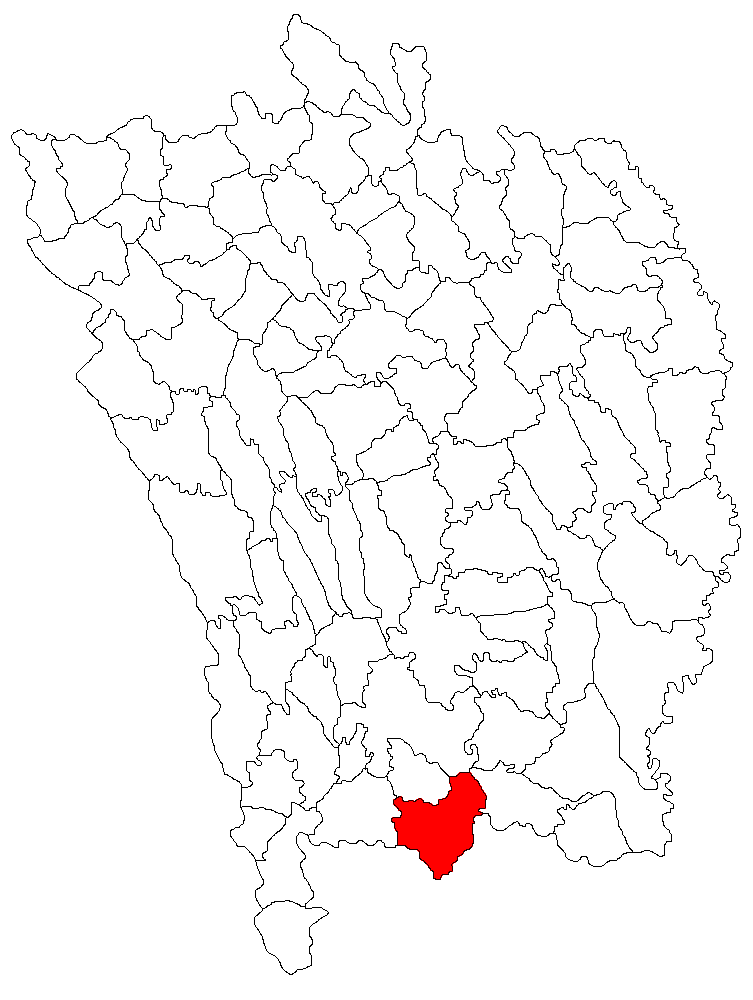
- Location in Vaslui County

- Location in Romania
- Coordinates: 46°09′N 27°48′E
- Country: Romania
- County: Vaslui
- Population (2021-12-01): 3,706
- Time zone: EET/EEST (UTC+2/+3)
- Vehicle reg.: VS

Vinderei is a commune in Vaslui County, Western Moldavia, Romania. It is composed of eight villages: Brădești, Docani, Docăneasa, Gara Docăneasa, Gara Tălășman, Obârșeni, Valea Lungă and Vinderei.
