= Ștefan cel Mare, Vaslui =

Ștefan cel Mare
- Commune
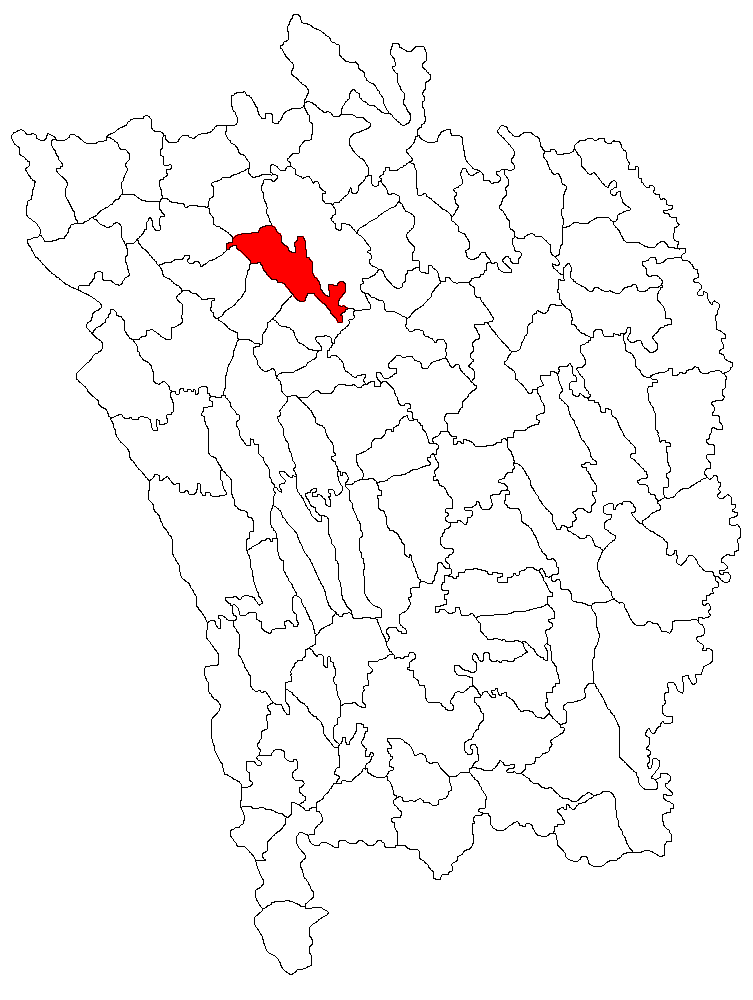
- Location in Vaslui County

- Location in Romania
- Coordinates: 46°43′N 27°38′E
- Country: Romania
- County: Vaslui
- Subdivisions: Bârzești, Brăhășoaia, Călugăreni, Cănțălărești, Mărășeni, Muntenești, Ștefan cel Mare

Government
  - Mayor (2020–2024): Mihai Moraru (PSD)
- Population (2021-12-01): 2,999
- Time zone: EET/EEST (UTC+2/+3)
- Postal code: 737495
- Vehicle reg.: VS

Ștefan cel Mare is a commune in Vaslui County, Western Moldavia, Romania. It is composed of seven villages: Bârzești, Brăhășoaia, Călugăreni, Cănțălărești, Mărășeni, Muntenești and Ștefan cel Mare.
