= Albești, Vaslui =

Albești
- Commune
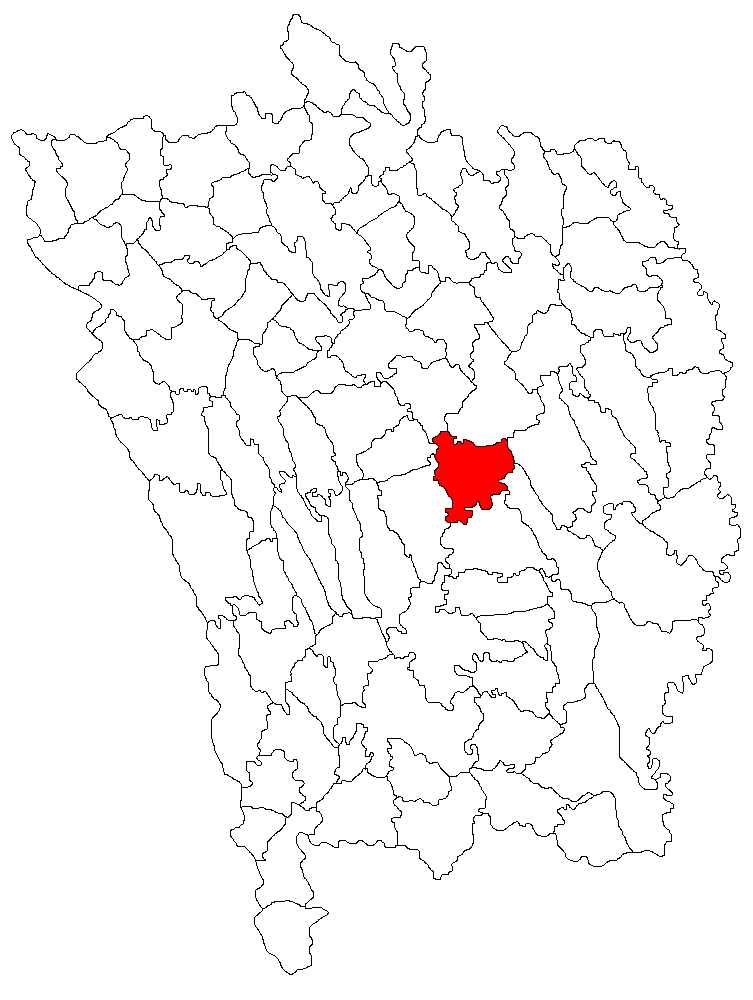
- Location in Vaslui County

- Location in Romania
- Coordinates: 46°30′N 27°52′E
- Country: Romania
- County: Vaslui
- Subdivisions: Albești, Corni-Albești, Crasna, Gura Albești

Government
  - Mayor (2024–2028): Monica Amanci (PSD)
- Area: 59.1 km^{2} (22.8 sq mi)
- Elevation: 164 m (538 ft)
- Population (2021-12-01): 2,330
  - Density: 39/km^{2} (100/sq mi)
- Time zone: EET/EEST (UTC+2/+3)
- Postal code: 737005
- Area code: +40 x35
- Vehicle reg.: VS
- Website: primariaalbestivs.ro

Albești is a commune in Vaslui County, Western Moldavia, Romania. It is composed of four villages: Albești, Corni-Albești, Crasna, and Gura Albești.

Crasna village is a small railway hub on the Tecuci–Iași line, with trains formerly branching off to Huși.
