= Fruntișeni =

- Commune
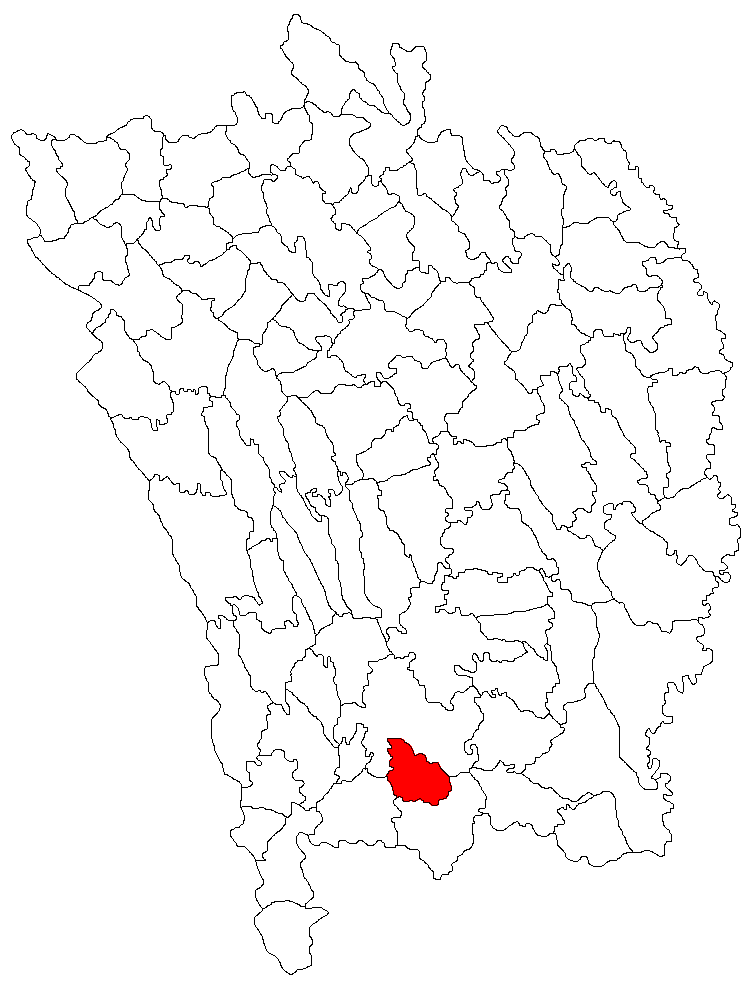
- Location in Vaslui County

- Location in Romania
- Coordinates: 46°12′N 27°46′E
- Country: Romania
- County: Vaslui
- Subdivisions: Fruntișeni, Grăjdeni

Government
  - Mayor (2020–2024): Ioan Onel (PSD)
- Area: 37.48 km^{2} (14.47 sq mi)
- Population (2021-12-01): 1,636
  - Density: 44/km^{2} (110/sq mi)
- Time zone: EET/EEST (UTC+2/+3)
- Postal code: 737281
- Vehicle reg.: VS

Fruntișeni is a commune in Vaslui County, Western Moldavia, Romania. It is composed of two villages, Fruntișeni and Grăjdeni.
