= Ibănești, Vaslui =

Ibănești
- Commune
- Ruins of Saint John the Baptist church in Mânzați, built in 1761

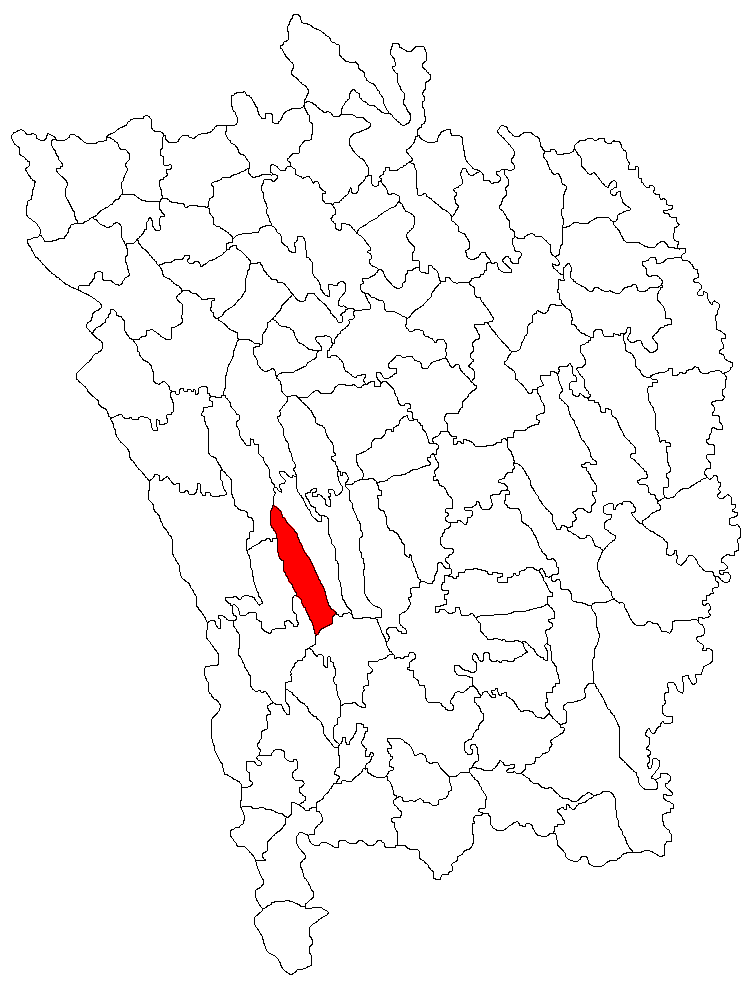
- Location in Vaslui County

- Location in Romania
- Coordinates: 46°23′48″N 27°37′27″E
- Country: Romania
- County: Vaslui
- Established: 1434

Government
  - Mayor (2020–2024): Benone Pletea (PSD)
- Area: 43.23 km^{2} (16.69 sq mi)
- Elevation: 150 m (490 ft)
- Population (2021-12-01): 1,317
  - Density: 30.46/km^{2} (78.90/sq mi)
- Time zone: UTC+02:00 (EET)
  - Summer (DST): UTC+03:00 (EEST)
- Postal code: 737013
- Area code: +(40) 0235
- Vehicle reg.: VS
- Website: primariaibanestivs.ro

Ibănești is a commune located in Vaslui County, Western Moldavia, Romania, with a population of 1,317 as of 2021. It is composed of three villages: Ibănești, Mânzați, and Puțu Olarului.

== History ==
Among the villages that make up the commune, Mânzați is the oldest. Located seven miles from Ibănești, it was named after cneaz Toader Manzat, mentioned in chronicles of Stephen III the Great. It was first mentioned in a document issued April 24, 1434. Currently, the act is kept in the Central State Archive of Warsaw, in a section on Moldavia.

Ibănești Commune was dissolved in 1968. At the time, it included Ghicani village, now part of Alexandru Vlahuță, to which Ibănești Commune was then absorbed. It was re-established in December 2003.

== Sites ==
Mânzați village features the ruins of a church built around 1761, restored in 1910 and demolished after 1940.

In 1889, on land near Mânzați, researcher Grigore Ștefănescu discovered the fossilized skeleton of a mammoth from the species Deinotherium gigantissimum. The fossil, belonging to a juvenile, is 4.5 m high and 3.5 m long. It is exhibited at Bucharest's Grigore Antipa National Museum of Natural History, mounted in 1906 by Belgian restorer Louis-François De Pauw. This copy is now one of the most important displays at the museum. In 2005, the land where it was discovered was declared a paleontological subject of national interest.

== Natives ==
- Constantin Chiriță (1925 – 1991), writer
