= Miclea =

Miclea is a Romanian surname. Notable people with the surname include:

- Mircea Miclea (born 1963), Romanian professor and psychologist
- Romulus Miclea (born 1980), Romanian football player

== Micle ==
- Veronica Micle (1850—1889), Romanian poet

== See also ==
- Miclești (disambiguation)
- Micleușeni
