= Pușcași =

- Commune
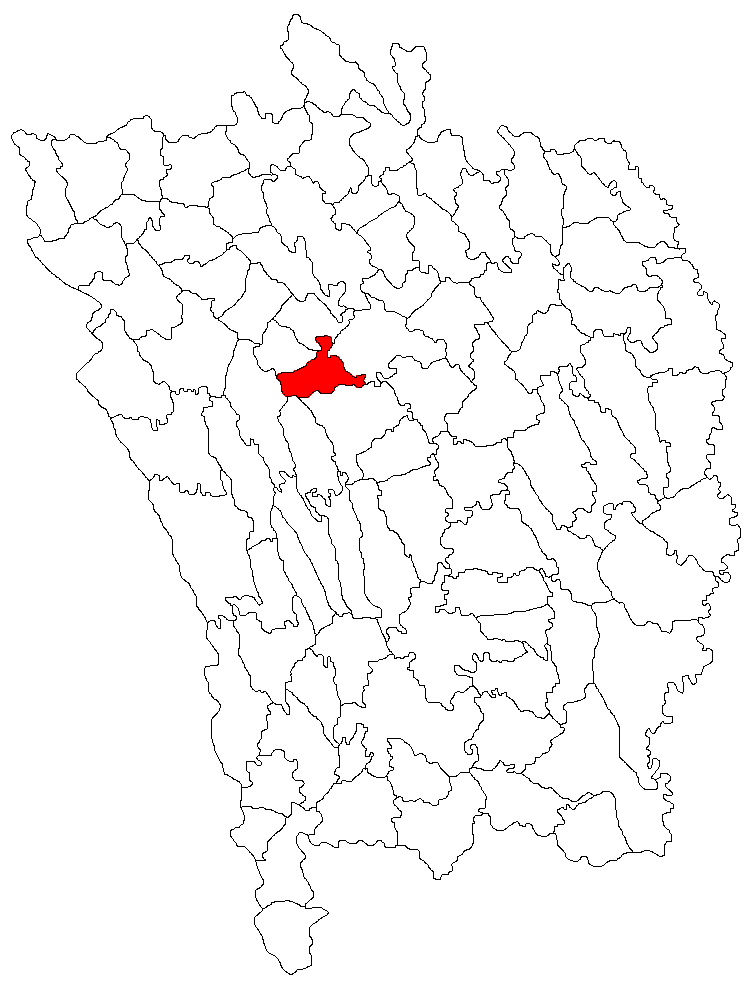
- Location in Vaslui County

- Location in Romania
- Coordinates: 46°37′N 27°38′E
- Country: Romania
- County: Vaslui

Government
  - Mayor (2020–2024): Paul Marian Ignat (PSD)
- Population (2021-12-01): 3,501
- Time zone: EET/EEST (UTC+2/+3)
- Vehicle reg.: VS

Pușcași is a commune in Vaslui County, Western Moldavia, Romania. It is composed of four villages: Poiana lui Alexa, Pușcași, Teișoru and Valea Târgului. These were part of Laza Commune until 2004, when they were split off.
