= Laza, Vaslui =

Laza
- Commune
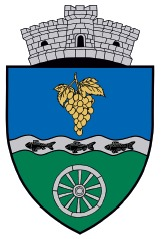
- Coat of arms

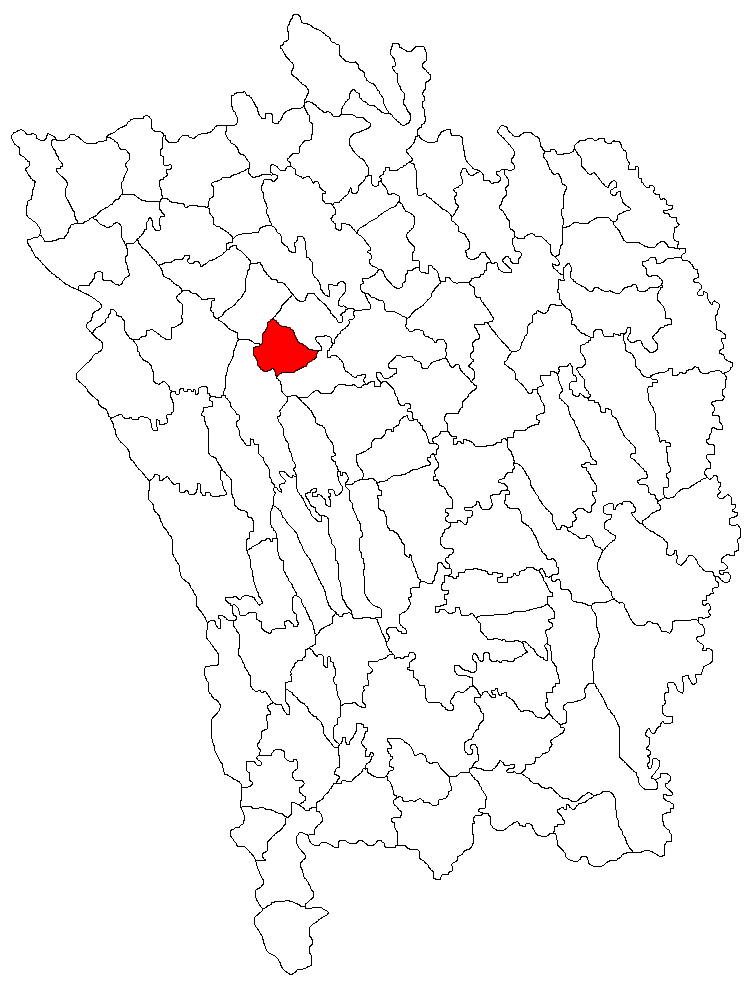
- Location in Vaslui County

- Location in Romania
- Coordinates: 46°39′N 27°35′E
- Country: Romania
- County: Vaslui

Government
  - Mayor (2020–2024): Ionuț-Adrian Pușcașu (PSD)
- Area: 27.51 km^{2} (10.62 sq mi)
- Elevation: 160 m (520 ft)
- Population (2021-12-01): 2,975
  - Density: 110/km^{2} (280/sq mi)
- Time zone: EET/EEST (UTC+2/+3)
- Postal code: 737325
- Area code: (+40) 0235
- Vehicle reg.: VS
- Website: www.primarialazavs.ro

Laza is a commune in Vaslui County, Western Moldavia, Romania. It is composed of four villages: Bejenești, Laza, Râșnița, and Sauca. It included four other villages until 2004, when these were split off to form Pușcași Commune.
