= Ivănești =

- Commune
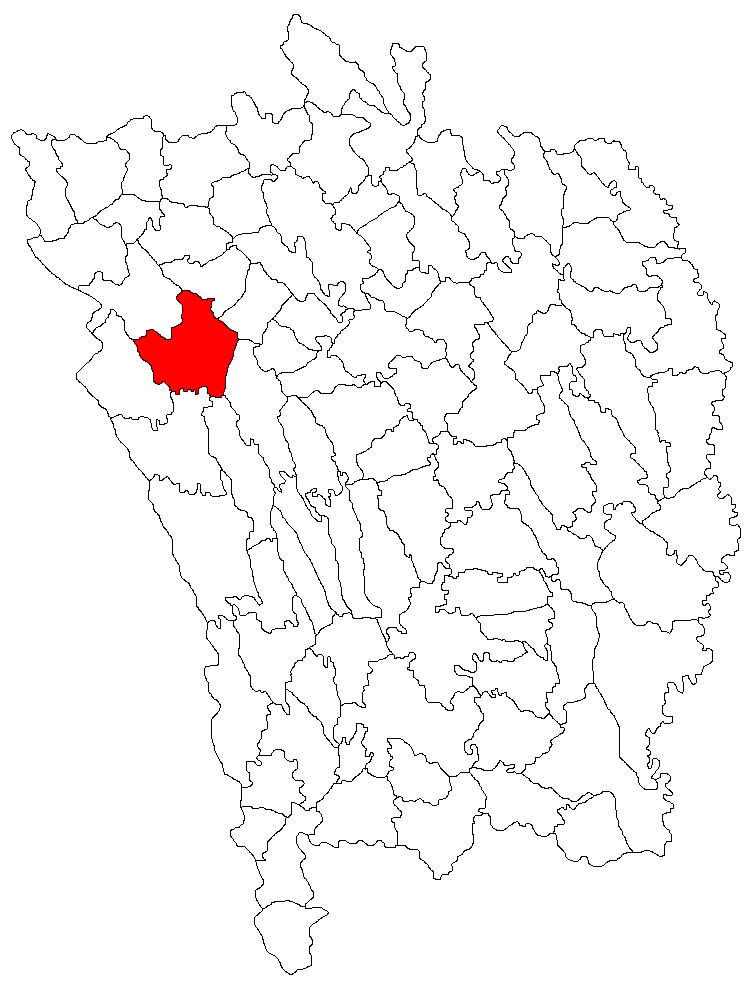
- Location in Vaslui County

- Location in Romania
- Coordinates: 46°39′N 27°27′E
- Country: Romania
- County: Vaslui
- Subdivisions: Albina, Bleșca, Broșteni, Buscata, Coșca, Coșești, Fundătura Mare, Fundătura Mică, Hârșoveni, Iezerel, Ivănești, Ursoaia, Valea Mare, Valea Oanei

Government
  - Mayor (2020–2024): Vasile Novac (PSD)
- Population (2021-12-01): 3,857
- Time zone: EET/EEST (UTC+2/+3)
- Vehicle reg.: VS

Ivănești is a commune in Vaslui County, Western Moldavia, Romania. It is composed of fourteen villages: Albina, Bleșca, Broșteni, Buscata, Coșca, Coșești, Fundătura Mare, Fundătura Mică, Hârșoveni, Iezerel, Ivănești, Ursoaia, Valea Mare, and Valea Oanei.

== Natives ==
- Petrică Cărare (born 1963), wrestler
