= Poienești =

- Commune
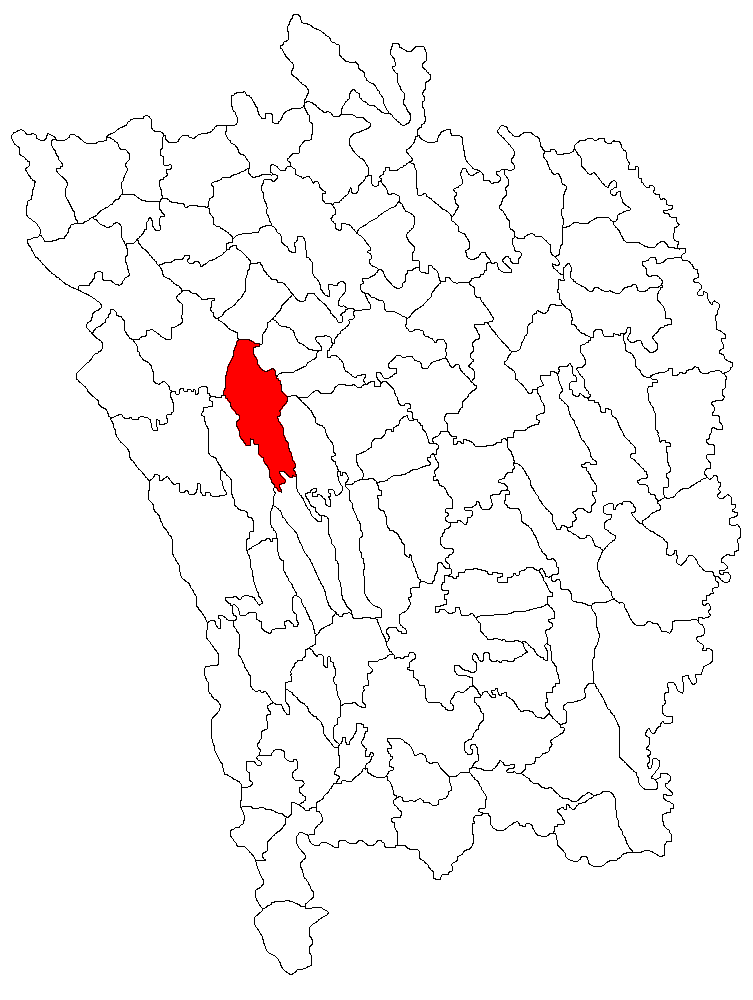
- Location in Vaslui County

- Location in Romania
- Coordinates: 46°37′N 27°31′E
- Country: Romania
- County: Vaslui

Government
  - Mayor (2020–2024): Manole-Nelu Caragață (PSD)
- Population (2021-12-01): 2,472
- Time zone: EET/EEST (UTC+2/+3)
- Vehicle reg.: VS

Poienești is a commune in Vaslui County, Western Moldavia, Romania. It is composed of seven villages: Dealu Secării, Florești, Frasinu, Poienești, Fundu Văii, Oprișița and Poienești-Deal. Although legally part of Poienești, Dealu Secării and Florești villages are administered by Alexandru Vlahuță Commune.
