= Mălușteni =

- Commune
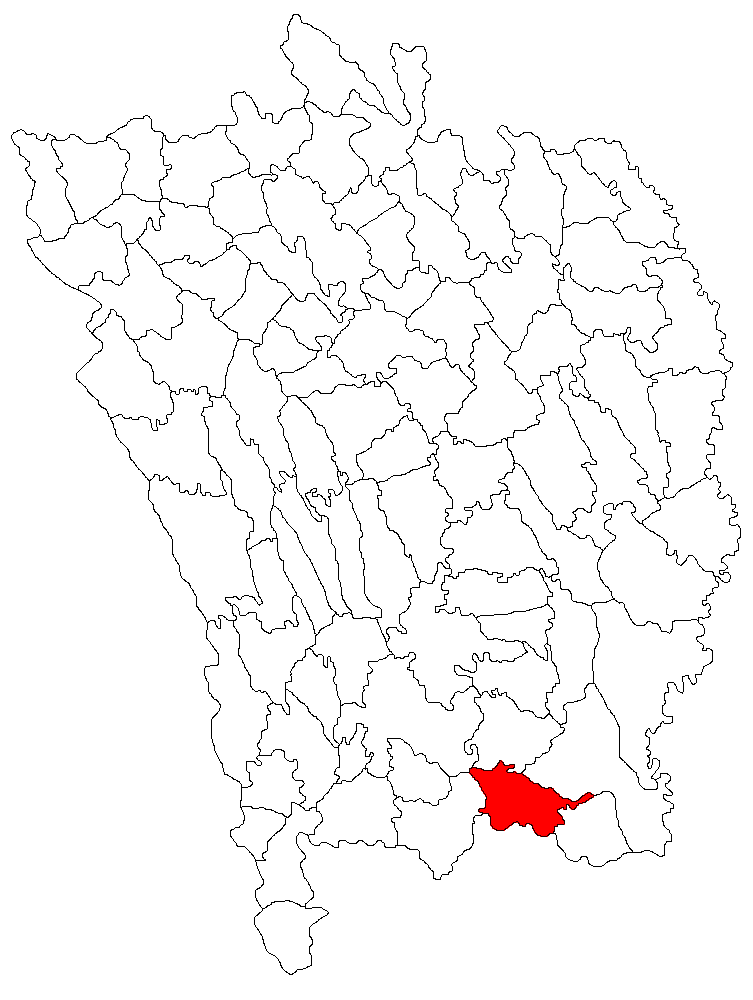
- Location in Vaslui County

- Location in Romania
- Coordinates: 46°11′N 27°55′E
- Country: Romania
- County: Vaslui
- Subdivisions: Ghireasca, Lupești, Mălușteni, Mânăstirea, Mânzătești, Țuțcani
- Area: 55.53 km^{2} (21.44 sq mi)
- Population (2021-12-01): 1,802
  - Density: 32/km^{2} (84/sq mi)
- Time zone: EET/EEST (UTC+2/+3)
- Vehicle reg.: VS

Mălușteni is a commune in Vaslui County, Western Moldavia, Romania. It is composed of six villages: Ghireasca, Lupești, Mălușteni, Mânăstirea, Mânzătești and Țuțcani.

The commune has an area of 55.53 km2.
