= Bălteni, Vaslui =

Bălteni
- Commune
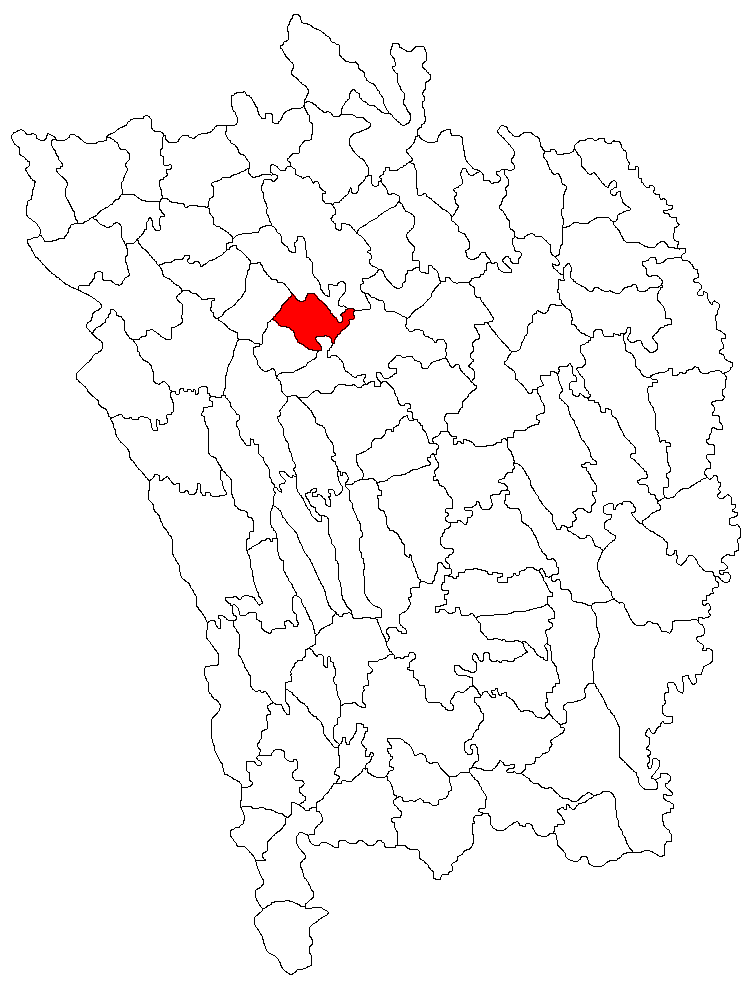
- Location in Vaslui County

- Location in Romania
- Coordinates: 46°40′N 27°38′E
- Country: Romania
- County: Vaslui

Government
  - Mayor (2020–2024): Constantin-Relu Brașoveanu (PSD)
- Population (2021-12-01): 1,585
- Time zone: EET/EEST (UTC+2/+3)
- Postal code: 737060
- Vehicle reg.: VS

Bălteni is a commune in Vaslui County, Western Moldavia, Romania. It is composed of three villages: Bălteni, Bălteni-Deal and Chetrești.
