= Oșești =

- Commune
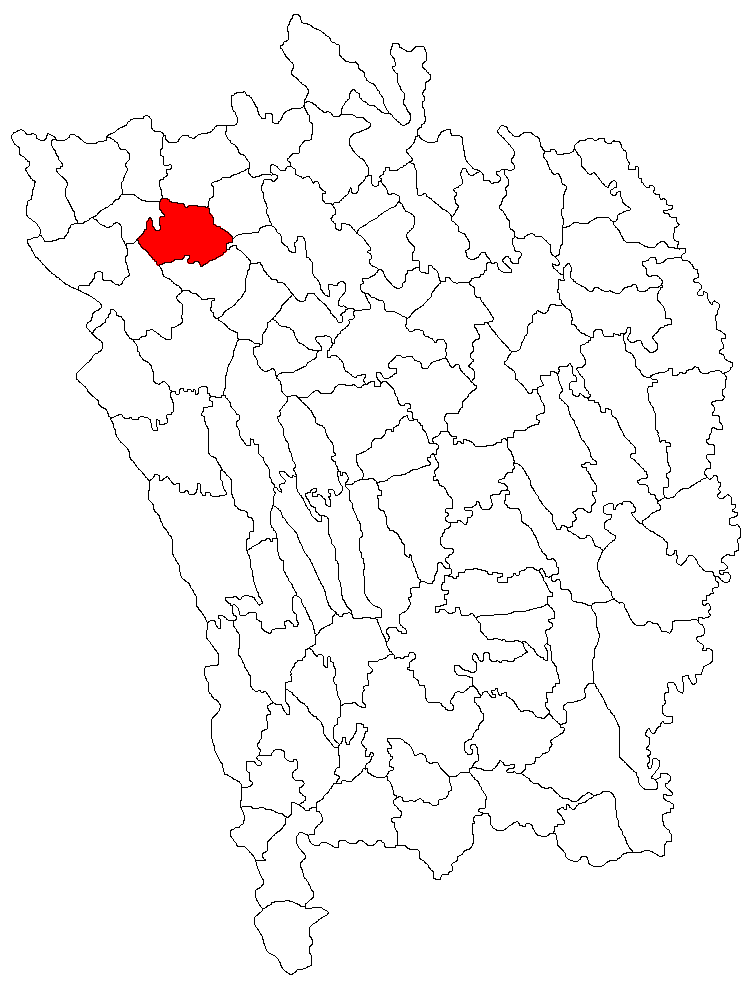
- Location in Vaslui County

- Location in Romania
- Coordinates: 46°46′N 27°28′E
- Country: Romania
- County: Vaslui

Government
  - Mayor (2020–2024): Ioan Todirașcu (PNL)
- Population (2021-12-01): 2,870
- Time zone: EET/EEST (UTC+2/+3)
- Vehicle reg.: VS

Oșești is a commune in Vaslui County, Western Moldavia, Romania. It is composed of four villages: Buda, Oșești, Pădureni and Vâlcele.
