= Pădureni, Vaslui =

Pădureni
- Commune
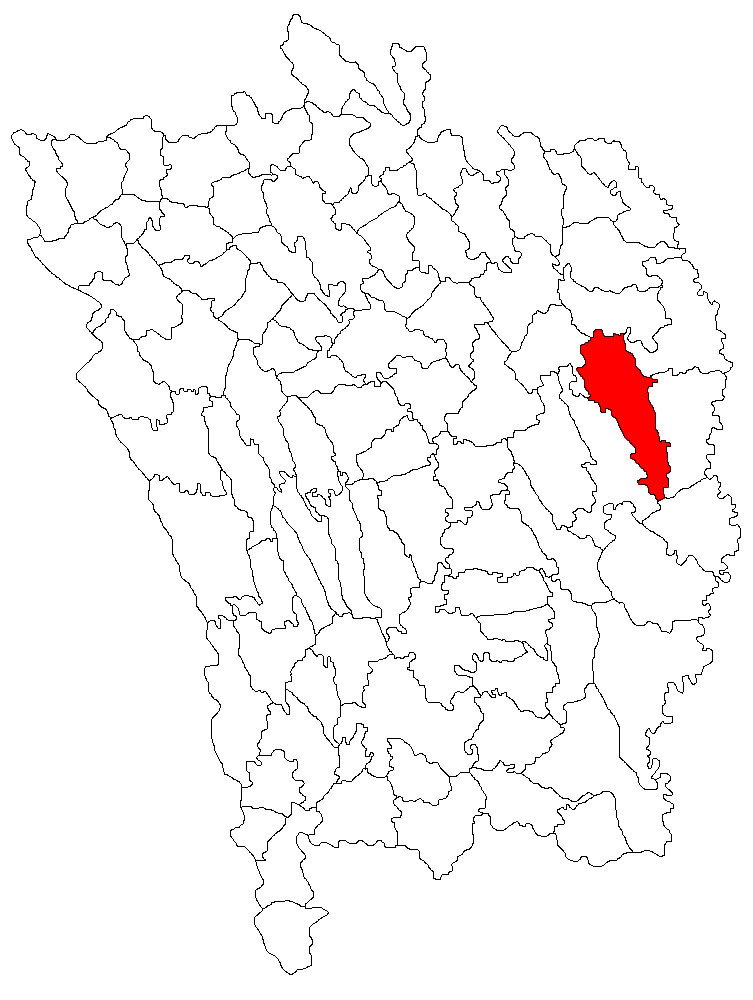
- Location in Vaslui County

- Location in Romania
- Coordinates: 46°37′16″N 28°05′05″E
- Country: Romania
- County: Vaslui
- Subdivisions: Căpotești, Davidești, Ivănești, Leoști, Pădureni, Rusca, Todireni, Văleni

Government
  - Mayor (2020–2024): Temistocle Diaconu (PSD)
- Population (2021-12-01): 3,436
- Time zone: EET/EEST (UTC+2/+3)
- Vehicle reg.: VS

Pădureni is a commune in Vaslui County, Western Moldavia, Romania. It is composed of eight villages: Căpotești, Davidești, Ivănești, Leoști, Pădureni, Rusca, Todireni and Văleni.
