= Muntenii de Jos =

- Commune
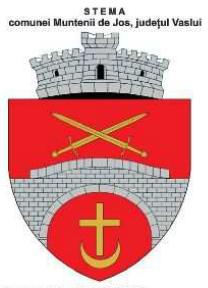
- Coat of arms

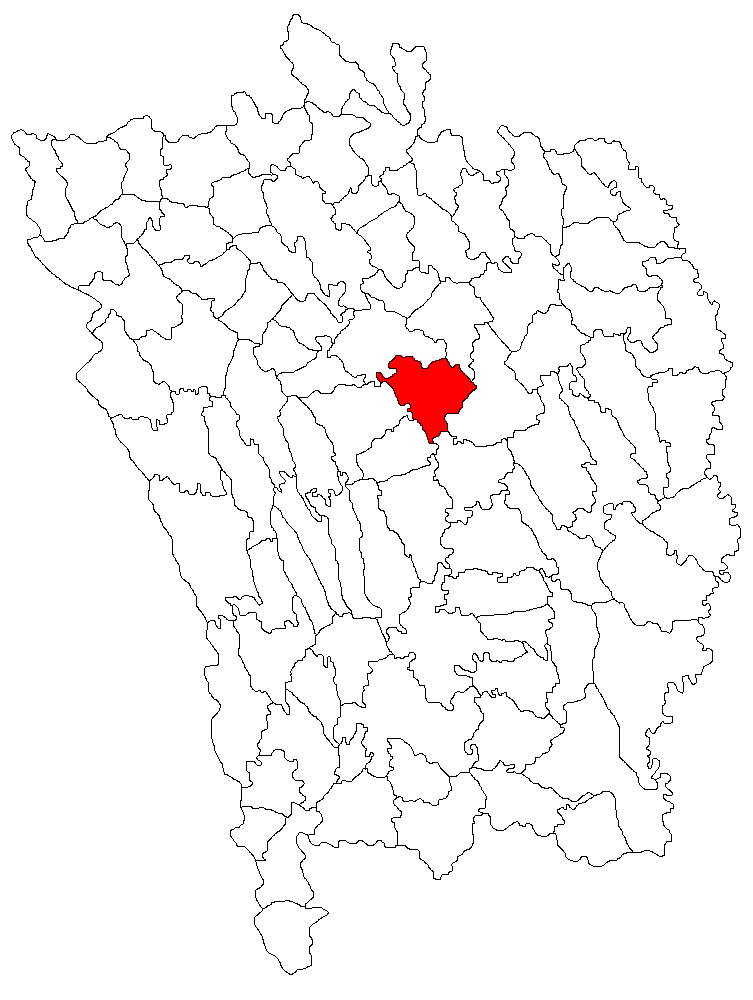
- Location in Vaslui County

- Location in Romania
- Coordinates: 46°37′N 27°46′E
- Country: Romania
- County: Vaslui
- Population (2021-12-01): 4,090
- Time zone: UTC+02:00 (EET)
  - Summer (DST): UTC+03:00 (EEST)
- Vehicle reg.: VS

Muntenii de Jos is a commune in Vaslui County, Western Moldavia, Romania. It is composed of four villages: Băcăoani, Mânjești, Muntenii de Jos and Secuia.
