= Miclești, Vaslui =

Miclești
- Commune
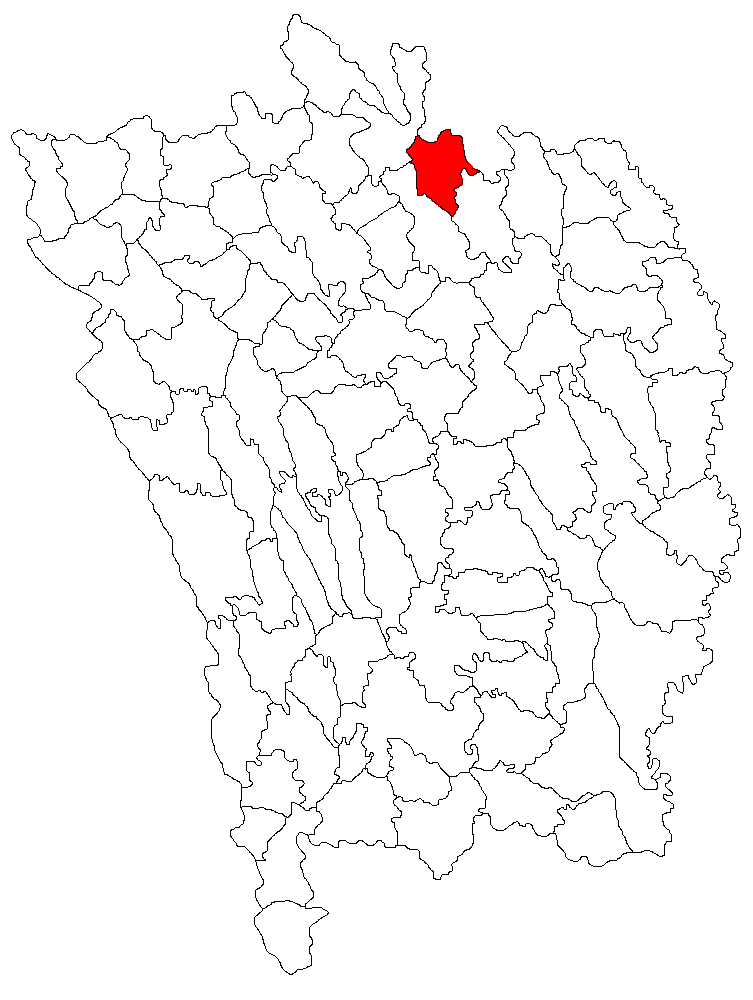
- Location in Vaslui County

- Location in Romania
- Coordinates: 46°48′08″N 27°47′04″E
- Country: Romania
- County: Vaslui
- Subdivisions: Chircești, Miclești, Popești

Government
  - Mayor (2020–2024): Dorul-Ineluș Agafiței (PSD)
- Area: 43.27 km^{2} (16.71 sq mi)
- Population (2021-12-01): 2,143
  - Density: 50/km^{2} (130/sq mi)
- Time zone: EET/EEST (UTC+2/+3)
- Vehicle reg.: VS

Miclești is a commune in Vaslui County, Western Moldavia, Romania. It is composed of three villages: Chircești, Miclești and Popești.
