= Bogdănești, Vaslui =

Bogdănești
- Commune
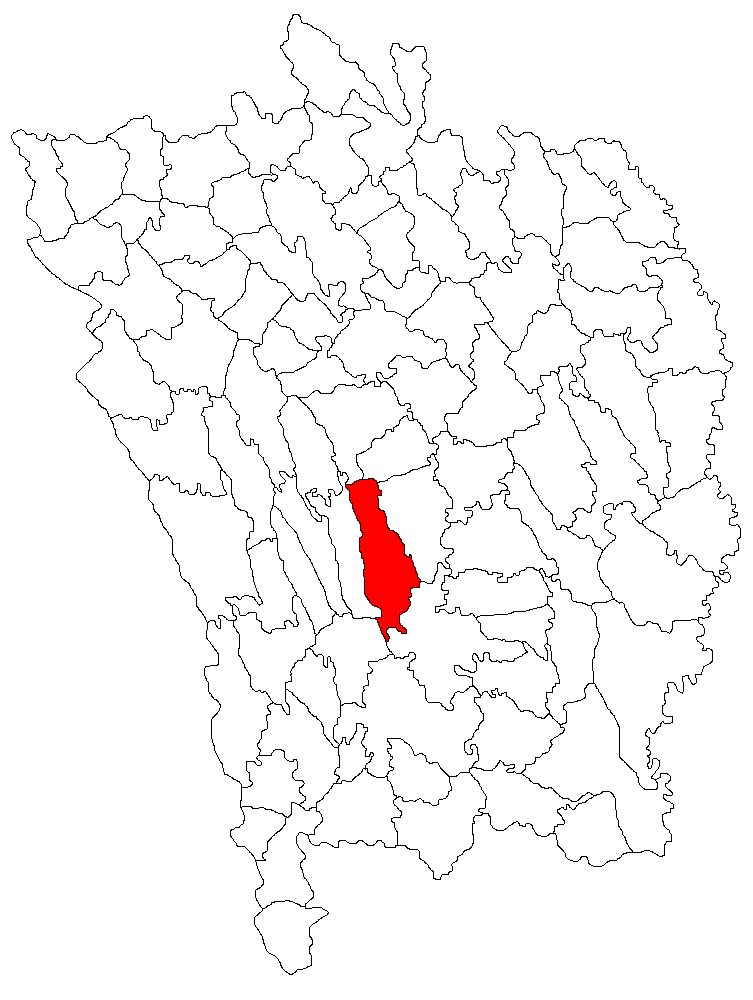
- Location in Vaslui County

- Location in Romania
- Coordinates: 46°27′N 27°43′E
- Country: Romania
- County: Vaslui
- Population (2021-12-01): 3,369
- Time zone: EET/EEST (UTC+2/+3)
- Vehicle reg.: VS

Bogdănești is a commune in Vaslui County, Western Moldavia, Romania. It is composed of nine villages: Bogdănești, Buda, Horoiata, Hupca, Orgoiești, Ulea, Unțești, Vișinari and Vlădești.
