= Solești =

- Commune
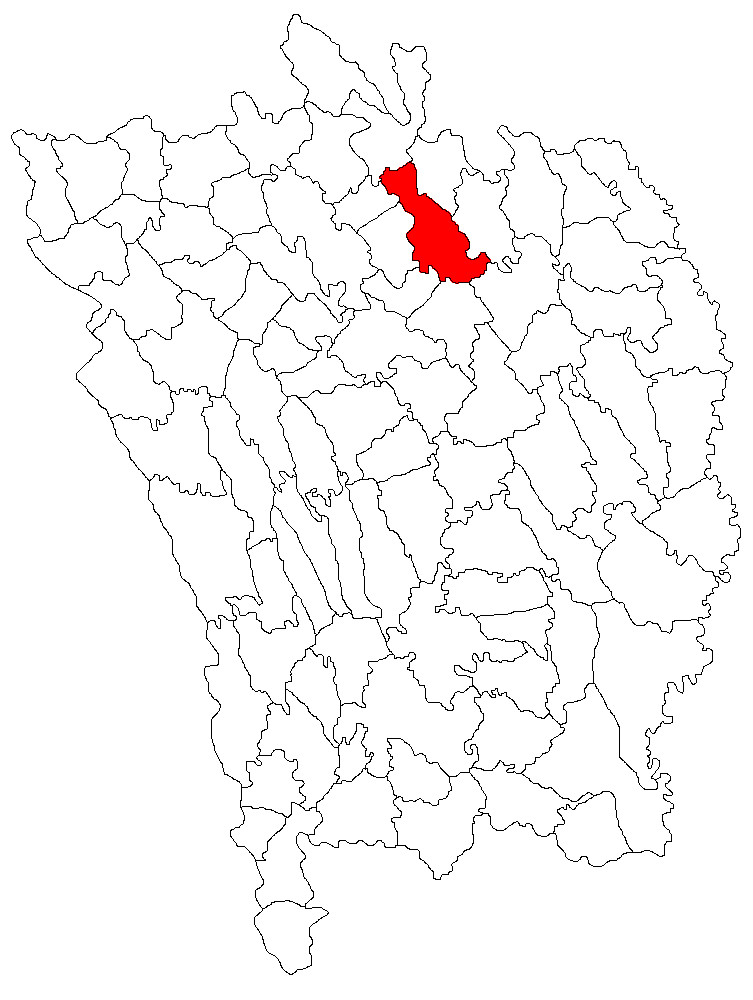
- Location in Vaslui County

- Location in Romania
- Coordinates: 46°46′N 27°47′E
- Country: Romania
- County: Vaslui
- Subdivisions: Boușori, Iaz, Satu Nou, Solești, Șerbotești, Știoborăni, Valea Siliștei

Government
  - Mayor (2020–2024): Mona Bujor (PSD)
- Population (2021-12-01): 3,114
- Time zone: EET/EEST (UTC+2/+3)
- Vehicle reg.: VS

Solești is a commune in Vaslui County, Western Moldavia, Romania. It is composed of seven villages: Boușori, Iaz, Satu Nou, Solești, Șerbotești, Știoborăni and Valea Siliștei.
