= Tătărăni =

- Commune
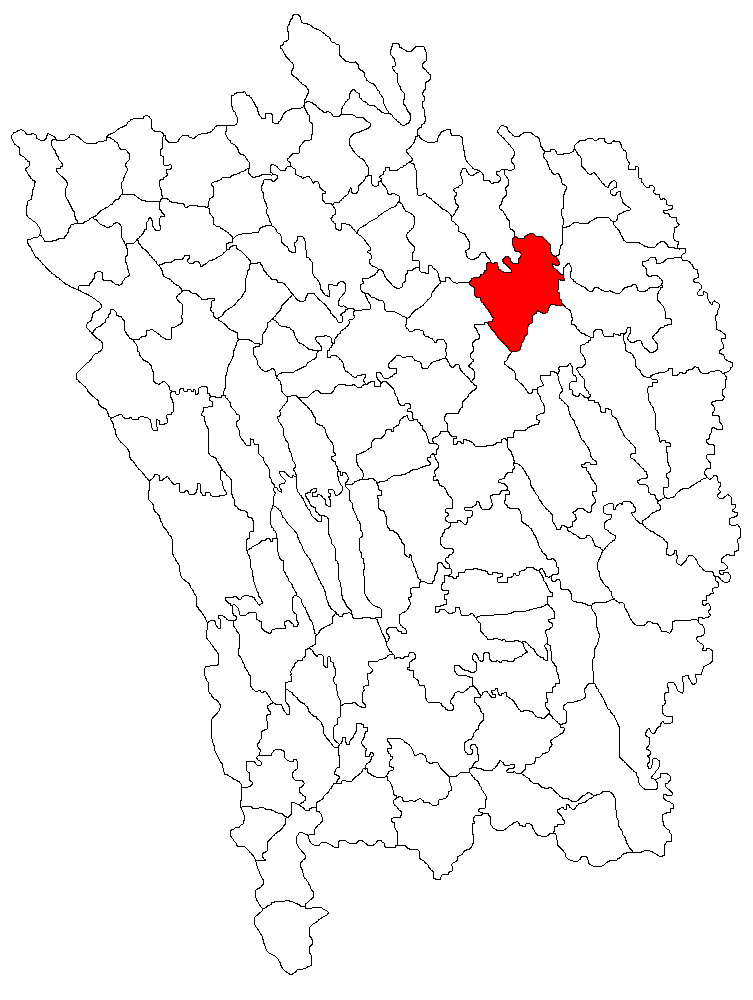
- Location in Vaslui County

- Location in Romania
- Coordinates: 46°42′N 27°58′E
- Country: Romania
- County: Vaslui

Government
  - Mayor (2020–2024): Ion Gentimir (PSD)
- Population (2021-12-01): 1,925
- Time zone: UTC+02:00 (EET)
  - Summer (DST): UTC+03:00 (EEST)
- Vehicle reg.: VS

Tătărăni is a commune in Vaslui County, Western Moldavia, Romania. It is composed of nine villages: Bălțați, Crăsnășeni, Giurgești, Leoști, Manțu, Stroiești, Tătărăni, Valea lui Bosie and Valea Seacă.
