= Crețești =

- Commune
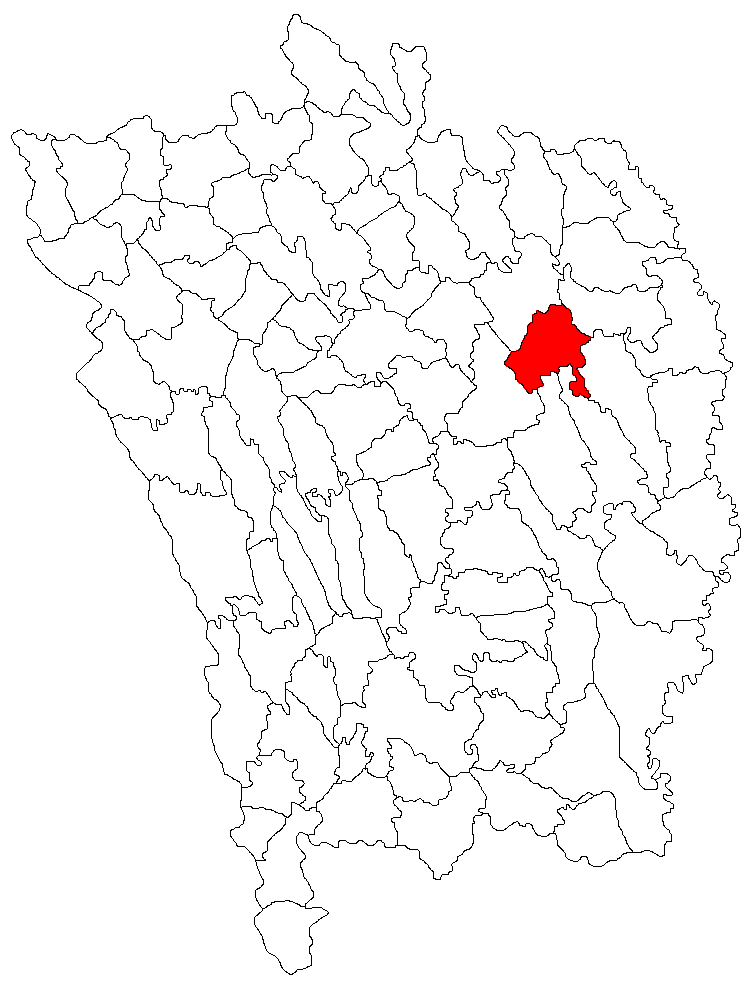
- Location in Vaslui County

- Location in Romania
- Coordinates: 46°38′N 27°57′E
- Country: Romania
- County: Vaslui

Government
  - Mayor (2024–2028): Cerulențiu Lăstun (PNL)
- Area: 54.55 km^{2} (21.06 sq mi)
- Elevation: 174 m (571 ft)
- Population (2021-12-01): 1,620
  - Density: 29.7/km^{2} (76.9/sq mi)
- Time zone: EET/EEST (UTC+2/+3)
- Postal code: 737155
- Area code: +(40) 235
- Vehicle reg.: VS
- Website: www.primariacretesti.ro

Crețești is a commune in Vaslui County, Western Moldavia, Romania. It is composed of four villages: Budești, Crețești, Crețeștii de Sus, and Satu Nou.
