= Alexandru Vlahuță =

Romanian writer

Alexandru Vlahuţă
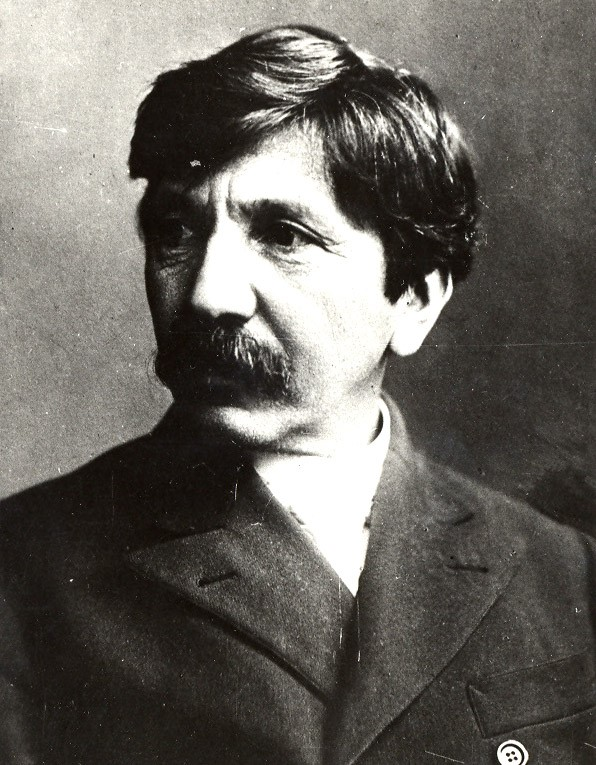
- Vlahuţă ca. 1900s
- Born: September 5, 1858; Alexandru Vlahuţă, Principality of Moldavia (formerly Pleșești)
- Died: November 19, 1919 (aged 61); București, Kingdom of Romania
- Resting place: Bellu Cemetery, Bucharest
- Education: University of Bucharest (dropped out)
- Occupations: Writer, poet, publicist
- Spouse(s): Margareta Dona; Ida Pagano Alexandrina Ruxandra Gâlcă (m. 1905–1919)
- Writing career
- Language: Romanian
- Period: 1880–1919
- Genres: Lyric poetry; memoir; novella; short story; journal
- Movement: Realism

Alexandru Vlahuță (Romanian pronunciation: [alekˈsandru vlaˈhut͡sə]; 5/17 September 1858 – 19 November 1919) was a Romanian writer. His best known work is România pitorească (Traditional Romania), an overview of Romania's landscape in the form of a travelogue. He was also the main editor of Sămănătorul magazine, alongside George Coșbuc.

The volume "Clipe de liniște" (Moments of silence) was awarded the Năsturel-Herescu Prize of the Romanian Academy in 1900, and in 1919 Vlahuță received the Grand Prize of the Academy for the volume "Poeme" (Poems) of 1915. In 1948 he was posthumously elected a member of the Romanian Academy.

== Biography ==
=== Childhood and youth years (1858–1880) ===
Vlahuţă was born on 5 or 17 September 1858, in Pleșești (currently called Alexandru Vlahuță), in the Principality of Moldavia (present-day Vaslui County, Romania) in a family of small landowners. In 1867 he started primary school, and from 1871 he attended high school in Bârlad, which he completed in 1878. The following year he took the baccalaureate exam in Bucharest and enrolled at the Faculty of Law of the University of Bucharest, without completing his studies.

In November 1879 he settled in Târgoviște, and in January 1880 he began teaching Latin and Romanian at the "Ienăchiță Văcărescu" Gymnasium. He also taught at the school at Dealu Monastery. In 1883 he spent a few months in Galați, where he published articles and sketches in the "Galații" newspaper, after which he settled in Bucharest.

=== Adulthood and writing career (1880–1919) ===
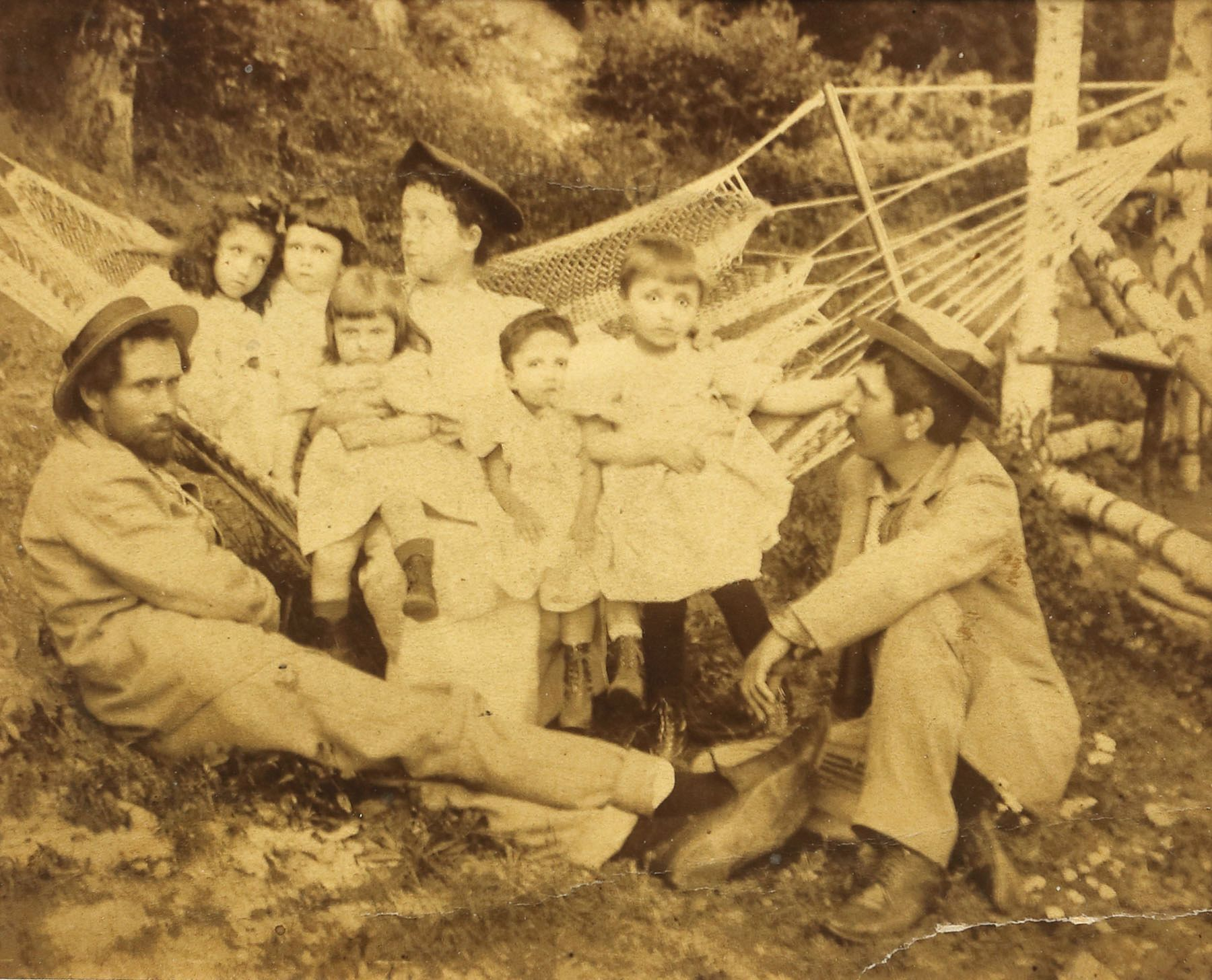
Vlahuţă (far right) with Barbu Ștefănescu Delavrancea (far left) and the latter's family in 1898.

Until 1893, he taught at several institutions in Bucharest, including the Normal School of the Society for the Education of the Romanian People, the "Elena Doamna" Asylum and the "Sfântul Gheorghe" High School. In 1888, at the proposal of Titu Maiorescu, he was appointed school auditor for Prahova and Buzău counties.

He later worked as a proofreader at the Parliamentary Annals, secretary of the Industrial Commission under the Ministry of Domains and head of office within the same ministry. From 1901, he worked as a clerk at the House of Schools, and in 1907 he was in charge of the institution's Pedagogical Museum.

In 1905 he married for the third time, Alexandrina Ruxandra Gâlcă, the daughter of a landowner from Dragosloveni. She received a house and 24 acres of vineyard as a dowry. The home in Dragosloveni became for Vlahuță a place of retreat and work, as well as a meeting place with writers and artists of the era.

During World War I, after the advance of German troops towards eastern Europe, Vlahuță took refuge in Moldavia, living in Iași and Bârlad between 1916 and 1917. In 1918, he was at the front and, together with Ioan Alexandru Brătescu-Voinești, he led the newspaper Dacia. In 1919, he published the magazine Lamura, commissioned by the Ministry of Religions and Public Instruction.

In 1916, in Bârlad, he met Vasile Voiculescu, to whom he became a literary mentor.

== Writing career ==
In April 1880, Vlahuță published poems in the magazine "Convorbiri literare" (Literary Conversations). He later collaborated in numerous publications, including România Liberă, Epoca, Familia, Revista nouă, Adevărul, Viața Românească, Universul, Luceafărul, and Flacăra.

During his time in Târgoviște, he was part of the editorial board of the newspaper Armonia. In 1893, together with Alceu Urechia, he founded the magazine Vieața, which he edited until 1896. In 1901, together with George Coșbuc, he published the magazine "Sămănătorul" (The Sower).

Vlahuță also held literary conferences at the Romanian Athenaeum. On March 12, 1892, he presented the conference Curentul Eminescu, published the same year together with the poem "Unde ni sunt visătorii" (Where Are Our Dreamers?).

In 1899 he published the short story collection "Clipe de liniște" (Moments of Silence). In the 1900 general session of the Romanian Academy, the volume was put to a vote for the Năsturel-Herescu Prize. In the first ballot it obtained 14 votes for and 11 against, without meeting the required two-thirds majority. In the second ballot it obtained 17 votes for and 8 against, and the prize, worth 4,000 lei, was awarded to Vlahuță.

An important part of his literary activity was related to the elaboration of the volume "Romania pitorească" (Traditional Romania). The work was originally conceived under the title Geografia pitorească a României (Traditional Geography of Romania) and was to serve as a school guide. For documentation, Vlahuță traveled around the country and requested the help of teachers. On March 5, 1898, he published in the Gazeta săteanului the letter Cătră învățători, in which he requested information about the localities, traditions, occupations and customs of the inhabitants.

Romania pitorească was published in volume in Bucharest in 1901. The first edition, of 3,000 copies, sold out in approximately three months, and the Romanian Academy awarded the work for the year 1902. Literary critic Dumitru Micu characterized it as a "commented geographical atlas".

In 1902, Vlahuță and George Coșbuc jointly published "Carte de citire pentru școlile secundare și profesionale" (Reading Book for Secondary and Vocational Schools).

His friendship and interest in the work of the painter Nicolae Grigorescu were embodied in the monograph "Pictorul N. I. Grigorescu. Viața și opera lui" (Life and works of Painter N. I. Grigorescu), published in 1910 by Casa Școalelor. The volume was illustrated with 20 photogravure plates, 232 autotypes and 17 facsimiles made from photographs by Stelian Petrescu.

In 1919, Vlahuță received the Grand Prize of the Romanian Academy for the volume Poems, published in 1915. Vlahuță died in Bucharest on 19 November 1919, at his home on Visarion Street. He was buried two days later at Bellu Cemetery.

=== Prose ===
Alexandru Vlahuță's bibliography includes poetry, prose, journalism, conferences and travel writings. For the years of editions in the table, the records from the Modern Romanian Bibliography of the Library of the Romanian Academy are mainly used, supplemented with the bibliographic data of the Cronologia della Letteratura Rumena. The classification of the volume Un an de lute as journalism is supported by Ion Buzași's analysis of Vlahuță's journalistic activity.

=== Posterity ===
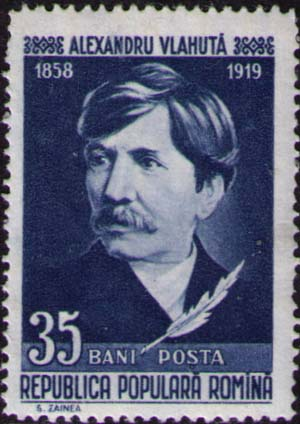
Alexandru Vlahuță on Romanian stamp, 1958

After the writer's death, his wife Ruxandra kept the house in Dragosloveni. In 1926, she organized a cultural settlement here, which also functioned as a school for girls and a meeting place for writers. In 1958, on the occasion of the centenary of Vlahuță's birth, the house was renovated and inaugurated as the "Alexandru Vlahuță" Memorial Museum. The museum preserves furniture, books from the writer's library, magazines and objects that belonged to him and is part of the Vrancea Museum.

The Alexandru Vlahuță Memorial House in Agapia is located in a building built in 1885 by the writer's older sister as a residence for nuns. Vlahuță's mother also lived in this house, and the writer came here during the summer. In 1902, he expanded the building with a literary salon and two other rooms. Among those who were guests of the house were Ion Luca Caragiale, Barbu Ștefănescu Delavrancea, Octavian Goga and George Coșbuc. The memorial museum was established in 1953.

In 1948, Vlahuță was posthumously elected a member of the Romanian Academy. In 1956, the villages of Pleșești and Pătrășcani were reunited, and the new locality was named Alexandru Vlahuță, in the context of the approaching centenary of the writer's birth.

The writer's name is also borne by several educational institutions, including the "Alexandru Vlahuță" National College in Râmnicu Sărat, the "Alexandru Vlahuță" Technological High School in Podu Turcului, the "Alexandru Vlahuță" Theoretical High School in Bucharest, and the "Alexandru Vlahuță" Junior High School in Iași.
