= Boțești, Vaslui =

Boțești
- Commune
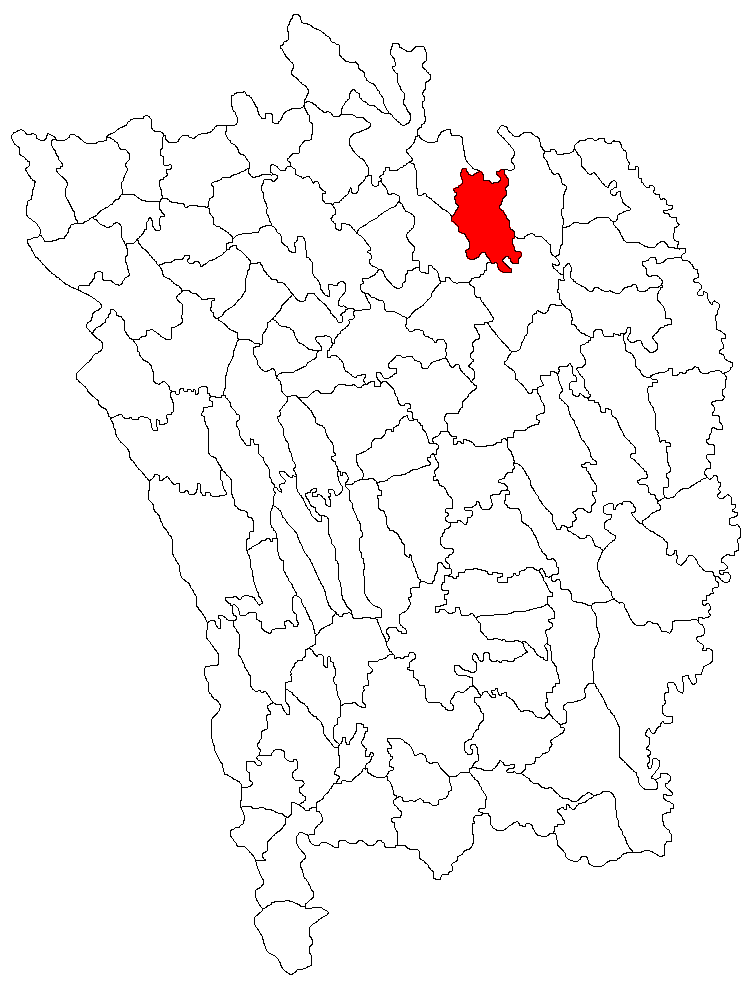
- Location in Vaslui County

- Location in Romania
- Coordinates: 46°48′N 27°53′E
- Country: Romania
- County: Vaslui
- Subdivisions: Boțești, Gănești, Gugești, Tălpigeni

Government
  - Mayor (2020–2024): Adrian Pantea (PNL)
- Area: 30.71 km^{2} (11.86 sq mi)
- Elevation: 203 m (666 ft)
- Population (2021-12-01): 1,736
  - Density: 56.53/km^{2} (146.4/sq mi)
- Time zone: UTC+02:00 (EET)
  - Summer (DST): UTC+03:00 (EEST)
- Postal code: 737105
- Area code: +40 x37
- Vehicle reg.: VS
- Website: www.primariabotesti.ro

Boțești is a commune in Vaslui County, Western Moldavia, Romania. It is composed of four villages: Boțești, Gănești, Gugești, and Tălpigeni.

== Natives ==
- Mihai Onofrei (1896–1990), sculptor and painter
