= Blăgești, Vaslui =

Blăgești
- Commune
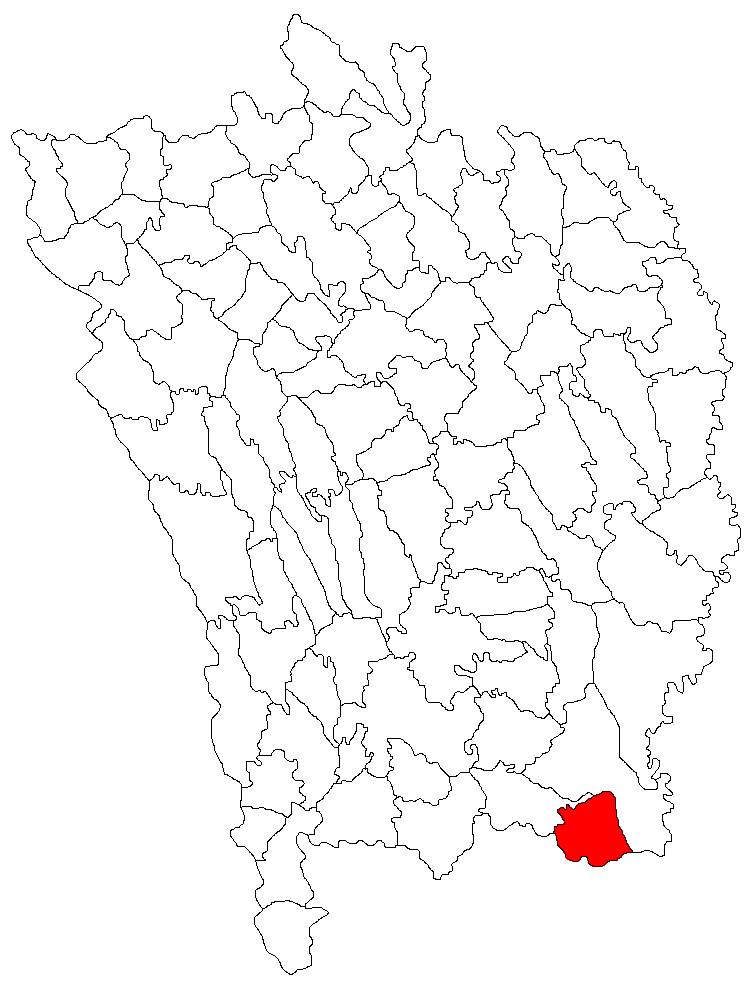
- Location in Vaslui County

- Location in Romania
- Coordinates: 46°08′14″N 28°00′47″E
- Country: Romania
- County: Vaslui
- Subdivisions: Blăgești, Igești, Sipeni
- Population (2021-12-01): 1,178
- Time zone: UTC+02:00 (EET)
  - Summer (DST): UTC+03:00 (EEST)
- Postal code: 737070
- Vehicle reg.: VS

Blăgești is a commune in Vaslui County, Western Moldavia, Romania. It is composed of three villages: Blăgești, Igești, and Sipeni.

== Natives ==
- Alexandru Anastasiu (1865–1947), brigadier general in World War I
