= Alexandru Vlahuță, Vaslui =

Alexandru Vlahuță
- Commune
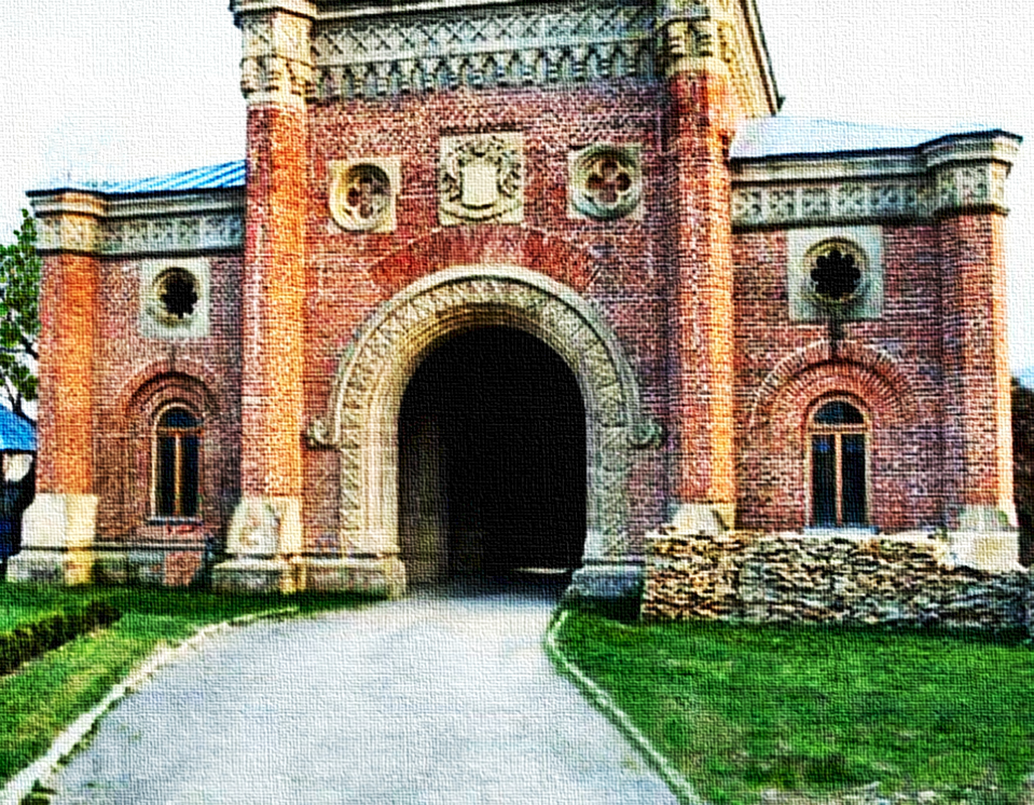
- Entrance to Florești Monastery

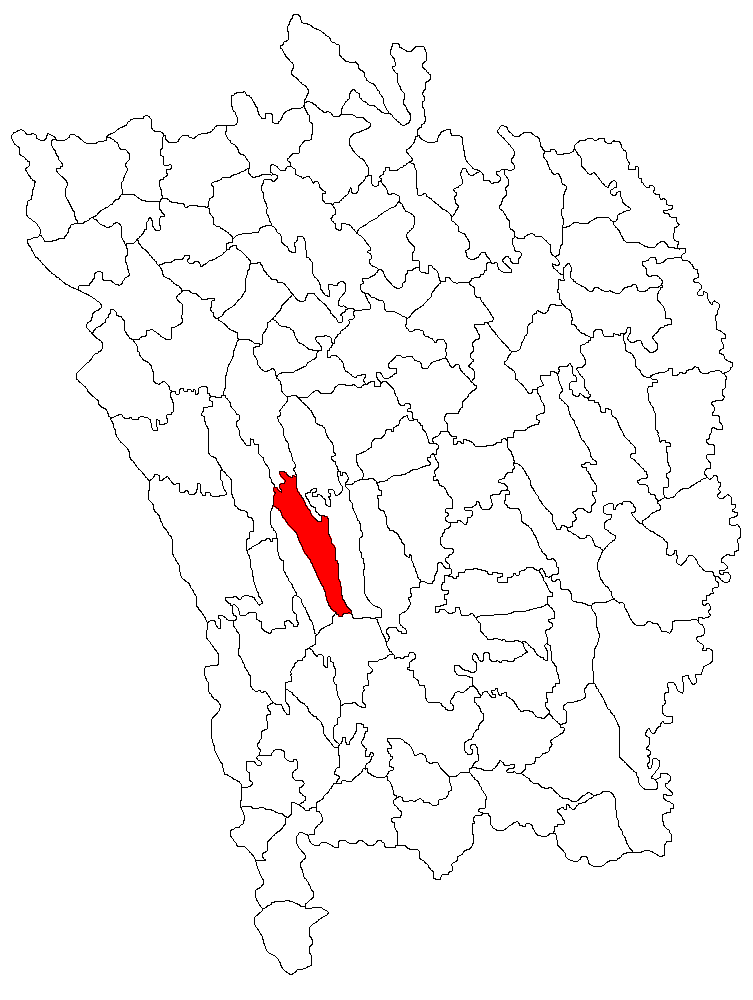
- Location in Vaslui County

- Location in Romania
- Coordinates: 46°25′N 27°38′E
- Country: Romania
- County: Vaslui
- Subdivisions: Alexandru Vlahuță, Buda, Florești, Ghicani, Morăreni

Government
  - Mayor (2020–2024): Dănuț Cojocaru (PNL)
- Area: 60.31 km^{2} (23.29 sq mi)
- Elevation: 130 m (430 ft)
- Population (2021-12-01): 1,333
  - Density: 22.10/km^{2} (57.25/sq mi)
- Time zone: UTC+02:00 (EET)
  - Summer (DST): UTC+03:00 (EEST)
- Postal code: 737010
- Area code: +(40) 235
- Vehicle reg.: VS
- Website: www.alexandruvlahuta.ro

Alexandru Vlahuță (formerly Pleșești) is a commune in Vaslui County, Western Moldavia, Romania. The commune is named for native son, writer Alexandru Vlahuță (1858-1919). It is composed of four villages: Alexandru Vlahuță, Buda, Ghicani, and Morăreni. It also administers Dealu Secării and Florești villages, legally part of Poienești Commune. Moreover, it included Ibănești, Mânzați, and Puțu Olarului villages until 2003, when these were split off to form Ibănești Commune.
