= Bogdănița =

- Commune
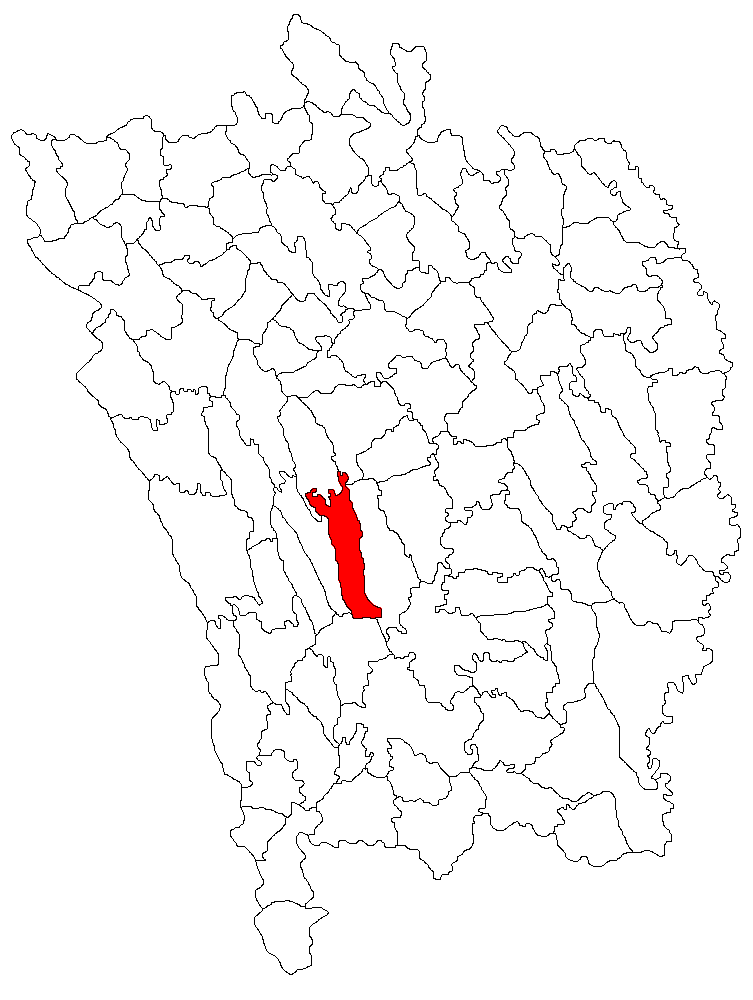
- Location in Vaslui County

- Location in Romania
- Coordinates: 46°27′N 27°41′E
- Country: Romania
- County: Vaslui
- Subdivisions: Bogdănița, Cârțibași, Cepești, Coroiești, Rădăești, Schitu, Tunsești

Government
  - Mayor (2020–2024): Viorel-Lucian Ciobotaru (PSD)
- Area: 48.67 km^{2} (18.79 sq mi)
- Population (2021-12-01): 1,292
  - Density: 27/km^{2} (69/sq mi)
- Time zone: EET/EEST (UTC+2/+3)
- Vehicle reg.: VS

Bogdănița is a commune in Vaslui County, Western Moldavia, Romania. It is composed of seven villages: Bogdănița, Cârțibași, Cepești, Coroiești, Rădăești, Schitu and Tunsești.
