= Banca, Vaslui =

Banca
- Commune
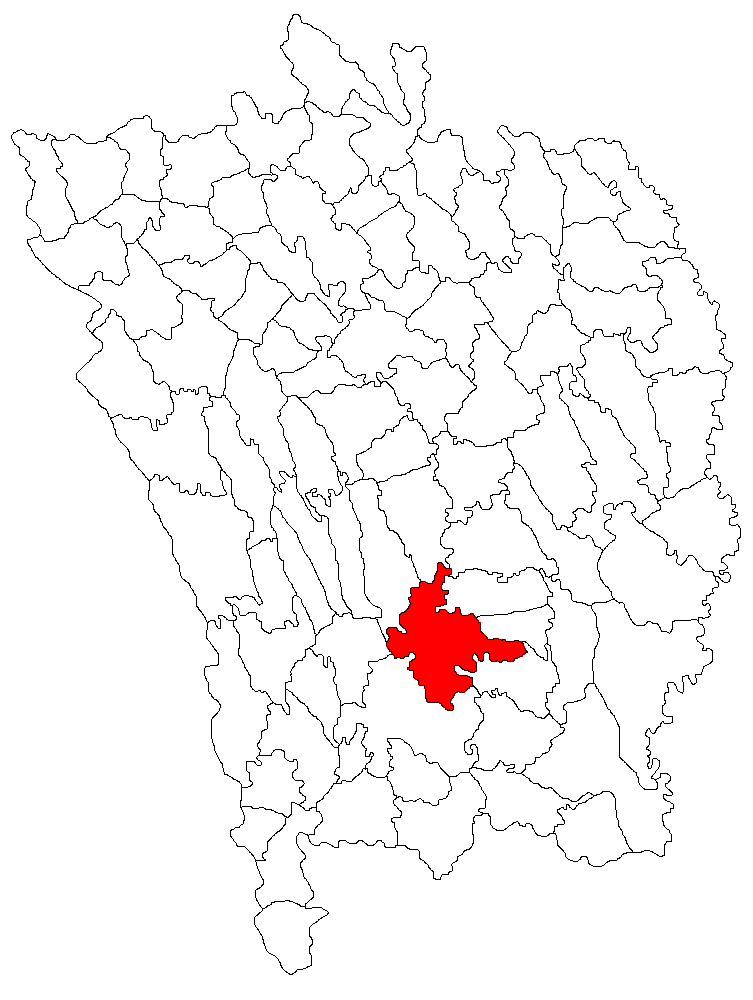
- Location in Vaslui County

- Location in Romania
- Coordinates: 46°18′N 27°48′E
- Country: Romania
- County: Vaslui
- Subdivisions: Banca, Gara Banca, Ghermănești, Miclești, Mitoc, Satu Nou, Sălcioara, Sârbi, Stoișești, Strâmtura-Mitoc, Țifu, 1 Decembrie
- Population (2021-12-01): 4,991
- Time zone: EET/EEST (UTC+2/+3)
- Postal code: 737025
- Vehicle reg.: VS

Banca is a commune in Vaslui County, Western Moldavia, Romania. It is composed of twelve villages: Banca, Gara Banca (the commune centre), Ghermănești, Miclești, Mitoc, Satu Nou (depopulated as of 2002), Sălcioara, Sârbi, Stoișești, Strâmtura-Mitoc, Țifu and 1 Decembrie (30 Decembrie during the Communist era).

The commune was formed in 1968 by merging the communes of Banca, Sârbi and Stoișești.
