= Vaslui County =

County of Romania

Vaslui County Județul Vaslui
- County
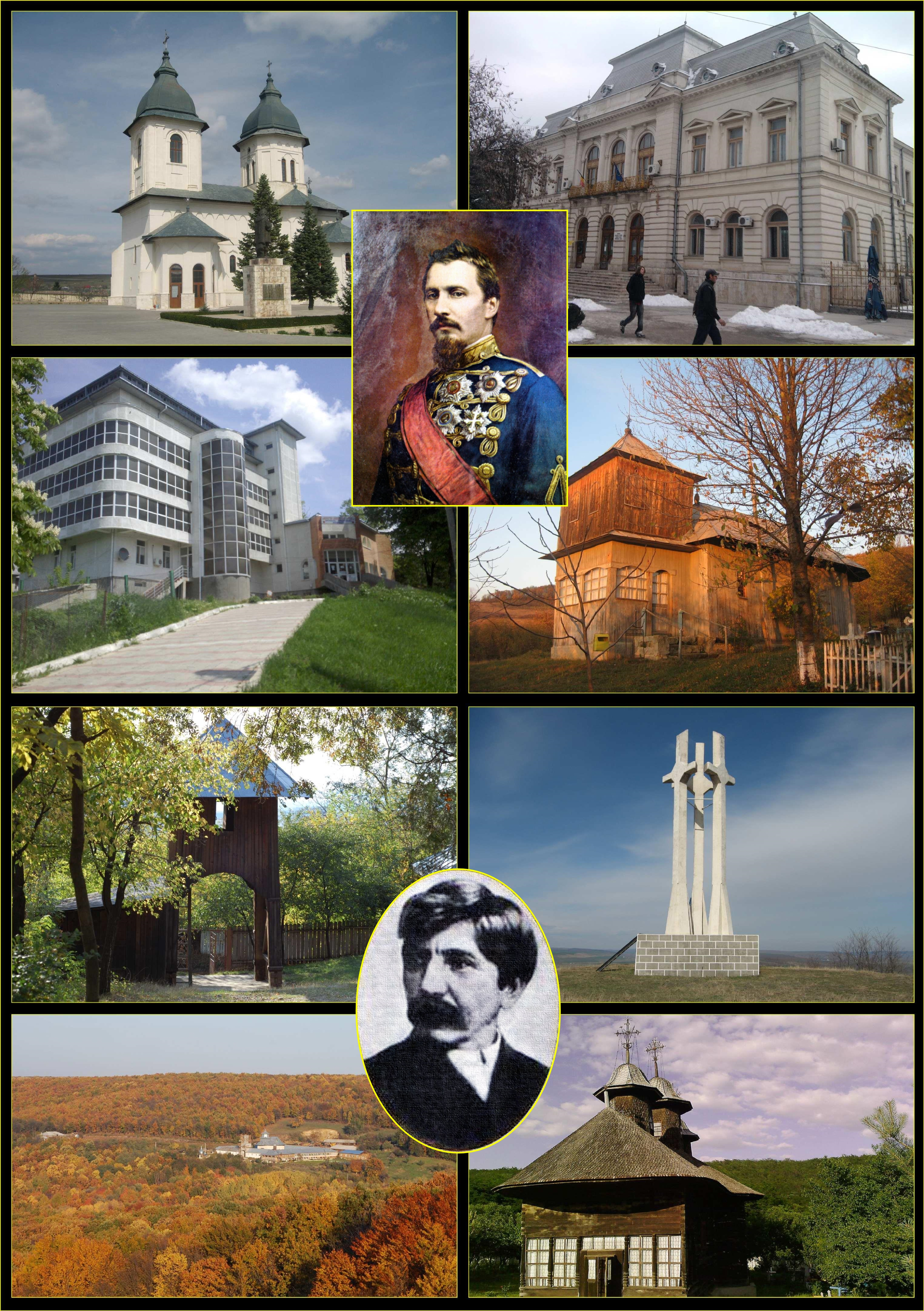
- Huși Cathedral, Negrești Town Hospital, Wooden Church "St. Nicholas" in Zăpodeni, Grăjdeni Monastery, Palace of Justice in Vaslui, Wooden Church in Popești, Monastery on "Movila lui Burcel", Wooden Church of Saint Nicholas in Pârvești, Alexandru Ioan Cuza, Alexandru Vlahuță

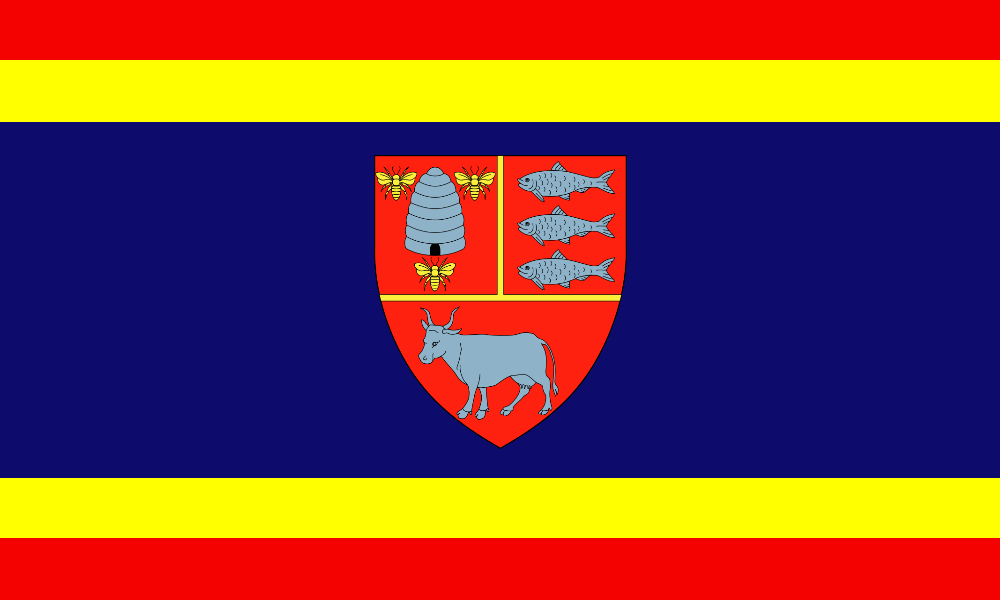
- Flag Coat of arms

- Coordinates: 46.59°N 27.77°E
- Country: Romania
- Development region: Nord-Est
- Historical region: Western Moldavia
- Capital: Vaslui

Government
  - President of the County Board: Ciprian-Ionuț Trifan (PSD)
  - Prefect: Daniel Onofrei

Area
  - Total: 5,318 km^{2} (2,053 sq mi)
  - Rank: 27th

Population (2021-12-01)
  - Total: 374,700
  - Rank: 24th
  - Density: 70.46/km^{2} (182.5/sq mi)
- Telephone code: (+40) 235 or (+40) 335
- ISO 3166 code: RO-VS
- GDP (nominal): US$ 1.572 billion (2015)
- GDP per capita: US$ 3,975 (2015)
- Website: County Council; County Prefecture

Vaslui County (Romanian pronunciation: [vasˈluj]) is a county (județ) of Romania, in the historical region Western Moldavia, with the seat at Vaslui.

== Demographics ==
In 2011, it had a population of 395,499 and the population density was 74/km^{2}.

- Romanians - over 98%
- Romas, other ethnicities - c. 2%

Year	County population
1948	344,917
1956	401,626 ▲
1966	431,555 ▲
1977	437,251 ▲
1992	457,799 ▲
2002	455,049 ▼
2011	395,499 ▼
2021	374,700 ▼

== Geography ==
This county has an area of 5,318 km^{2}.

The county lies on a plane, being bounded by the Prut River on the east and crossed in its centre by Bârlad River, a tributary of Siret River.

=== Neighbours ===
- Republic of Moldova to the east - Cahul District, Hîncești District, Leova District and Cantemir District.
- Neamț County, Bacău County and Vrancea County to the west.
- Iași County to the north.
- Galați County to the south.

== People ==
- Dimitrie Cantemir
- Alexandru Ioan Cuza
- Gheorghe Gheorghiu-Dej
- Alexandra Nechita
- Ana Pauker
- Ștefan Procopiu
- Emil Racoviță
- Constantin Tănase
- Nicolae Tonitza
- Alexandru Vlahuță

== Economy ==
Vaslui County was heavily industrialised during the Communist period and had large industrial complexes that went bankrupt during the 1990s. Today, the county's industry is mainly agricultural one, with other industries concentrated in the main urban areas.

County's main industries:

- mechanical components;
- chemicals;
- food stuffs;
- textiles.

== Tourism ==
The main tourist destinations are the cities of Vaslui, Bârlad, and Huși. The Vaslui County Council, the county councils of the Leova and Hîncești districts in Republic of Moldova, and the European Union (through the Phare program), have set up a program which seeks to promote tourism in these regions. The main tourist attractions of the Vaslui-Hîncești-Leova touristic program are, among others, the medieval and early modern churches and monasteries, the Manuc Bei Hunting Palace and the Manuc - Mirzaian Manor Palace (similar to Manuc's Inn in Bucharest) in Hîncești, as well as the region's natural riches.

== Politics ==
The Vaslui County Council, renewed at the 2024 local elections, consists of 34 councilors, with the following party composition:

Party	Seats	Current County Council
Social Democratic Party (PSD)	17	
National Liberal Party (PNL)	8	
Alliance for the Union of Romanians (AUR)	5	
United Right Alliance (ADU)	4	

== Administrative divisions ==
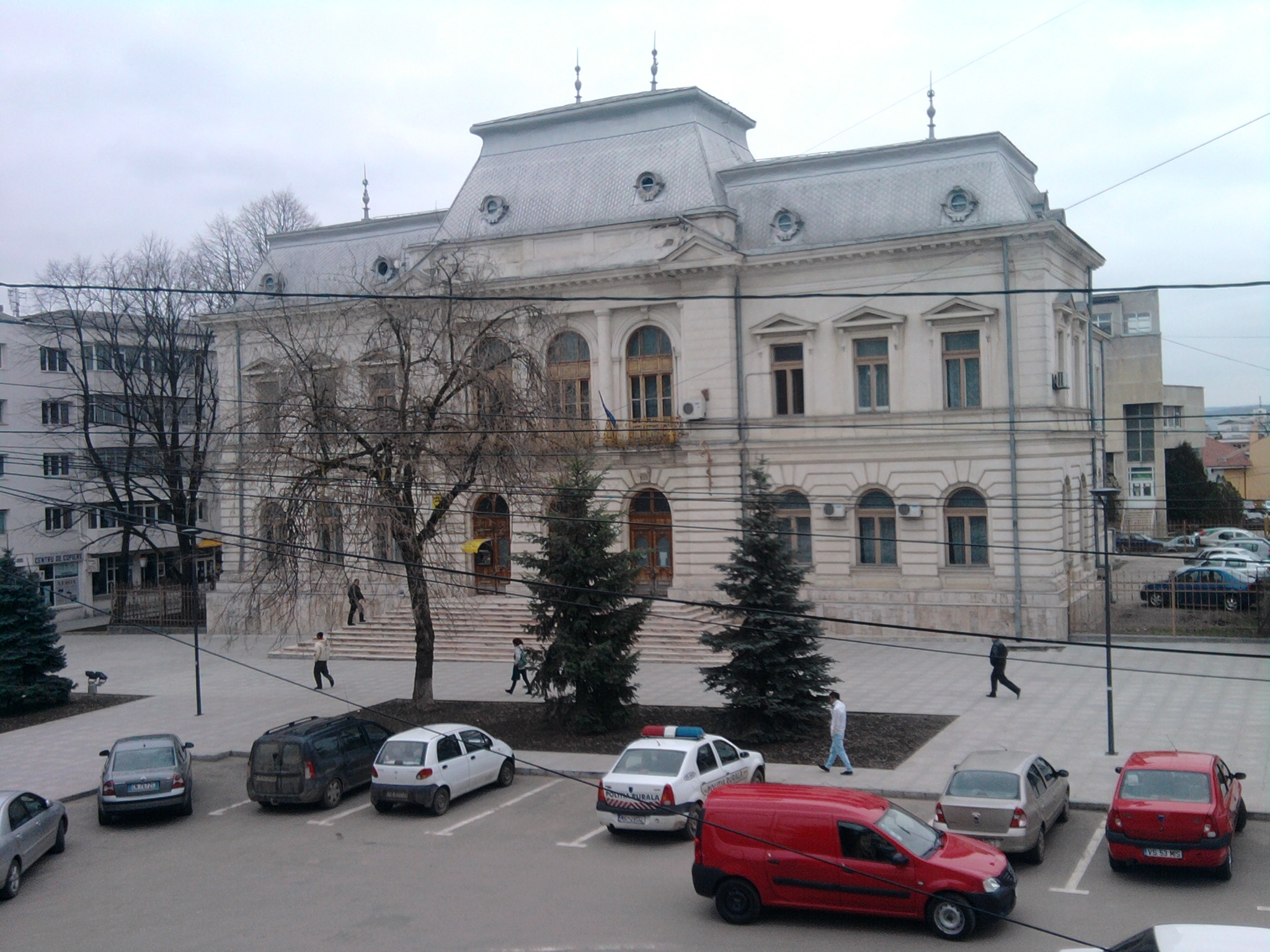
Justice Palace in Vaslui

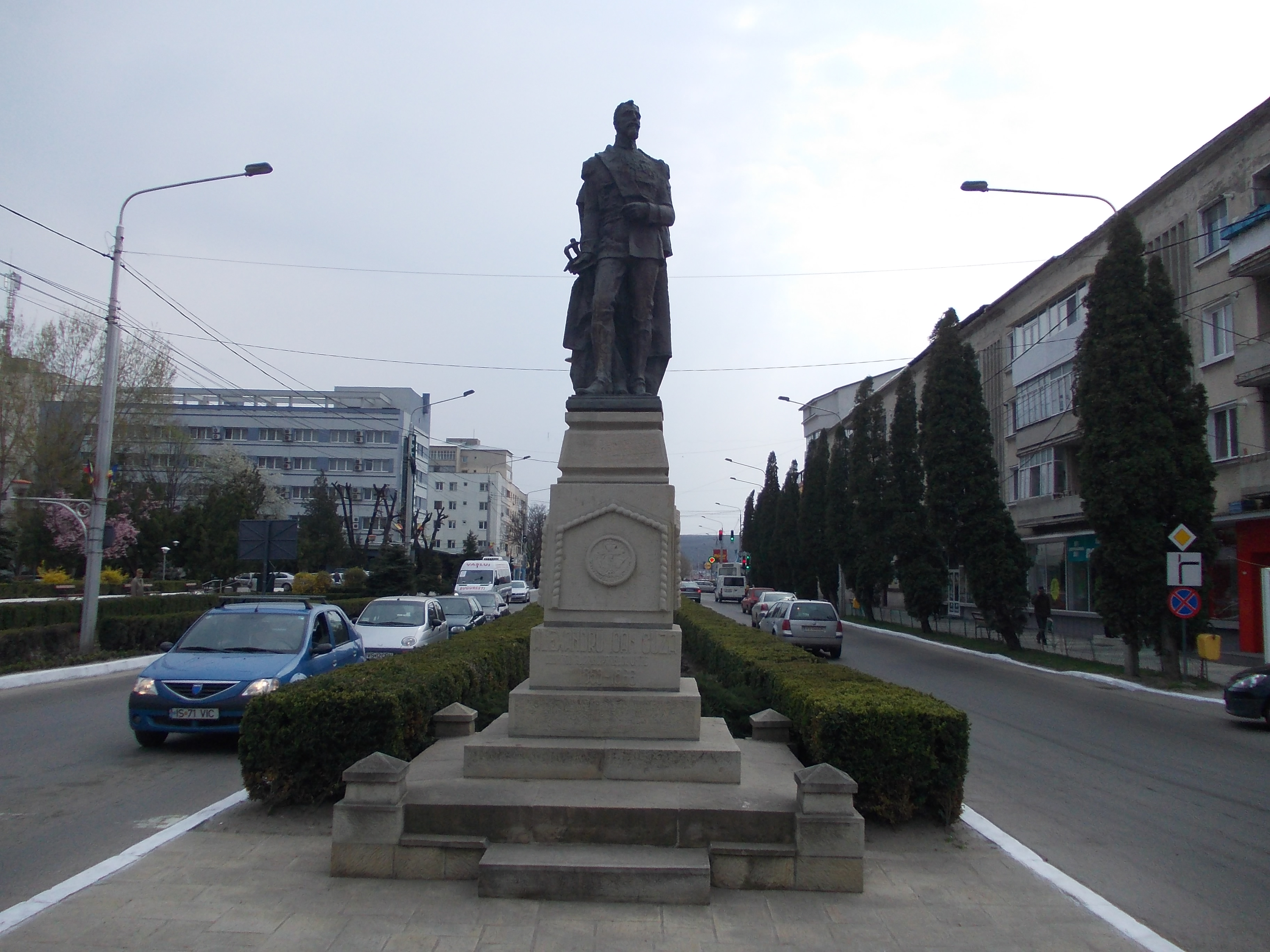
Statue of Alexandru Ioan Cuza in Bârlad

Vaslui County has 3 municipalities, 2 towns and 81 communes

=== Municipalities ===
- Bârlad
- Huși
- Vaslui: capital city;

=== Towns ===
- Murgeni
- Negrești

=== Communes ===
- Albești
- Alexandru Vlahuță
- Arsura
- Băcani
- Băcești
- Bălteni
- Banca
- Berezeni
- Blăgești
- Bogdana
- Bogdănești
- Bogdănița
- Boțești
- Bunești-Averești
- Ciocani
- Codăești
- Coroiești
- Costești
- Cozmești
- Crețești
- Dănești
- Deleni
- Delești
- Dimitrie Cantemir
- Dodești
- Dragomirești
- Drânceni
- Duda-Epureni
- Dumești
- Epureni
- Fălciu
- Ferești
- Fruntișeni
- Găgești
- Gârceni
- Gherghești
- Grivița
- Hoceni
- Iana
- Ibănești
- Ivănești
- Ivești
- Laza
- Lipovăț
- Lunca Banului
- Mălușteni
- Miclești
- Muntenii de Jos
- Muntenii de Sus
- Oltenești
- Oșești
- Pădureni
- Perieni
- Pochidia
- Pogana
- Pogonești
- Poienești
- Puiești
- Pungești
- Pușcași
- Rafaila
- Rebricea
- Roșiești
- Solești
- Stănilești
- Ștefan cel Mare
- Șuletea
- Tăcuta
- Tanacu
- Tătărăni
- Todirești
- Tutova
- Văleni
- Vetrișoaia
- Viișoara
- Vinderei
- Voinești
- Vulturești
- Vutcani
- Zăpodeni
- Zorleni

== Historical county ==
Județul Vaslui
- County (Județ)
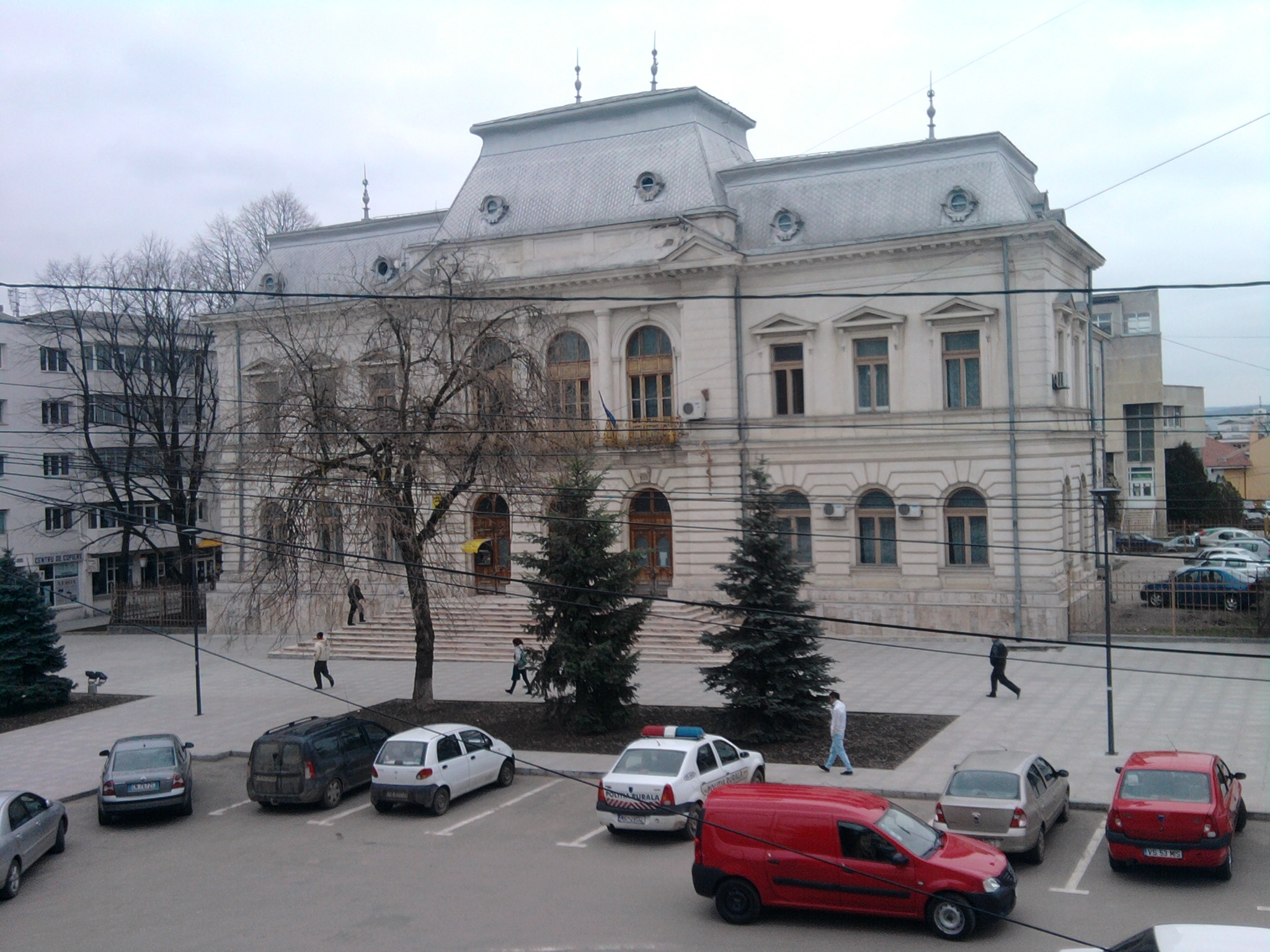
- The Vaslui County court building from the interwar period, later functioned as Vaslui city hall.

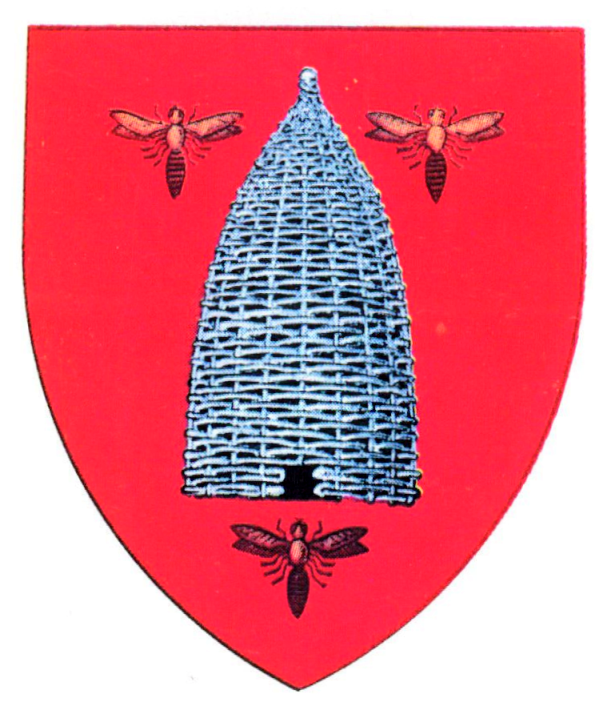
- Coat of arms

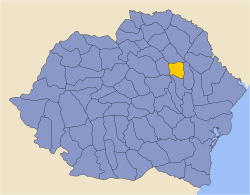
- Country: Romania
- Historic region: Western Moldavia
- Capital city (Reședință de județ): Vaslui

Area
  - Total: 2,260 km^{2} (870 sq mi)

Population (1930)
  - Total: 139,503
  - Density: 61.7/km^{2} (160/sq mi)
- Time zone: UTC+2 (EET)
  - Summer (DST): UTC+3 (EEST)

The county was located in the central-eastern part of Romania, in the center of the historical region of Moldavia. At present, most of its territory is included in the current Vaslui County borders, smaller parts being included in Iași County and Bacău County. It bordered on the north with the Iași County, to the west with Roman County, to the east with Fălciu County and to the south with the Tutova and Bacău Counties.

=== Administration ===
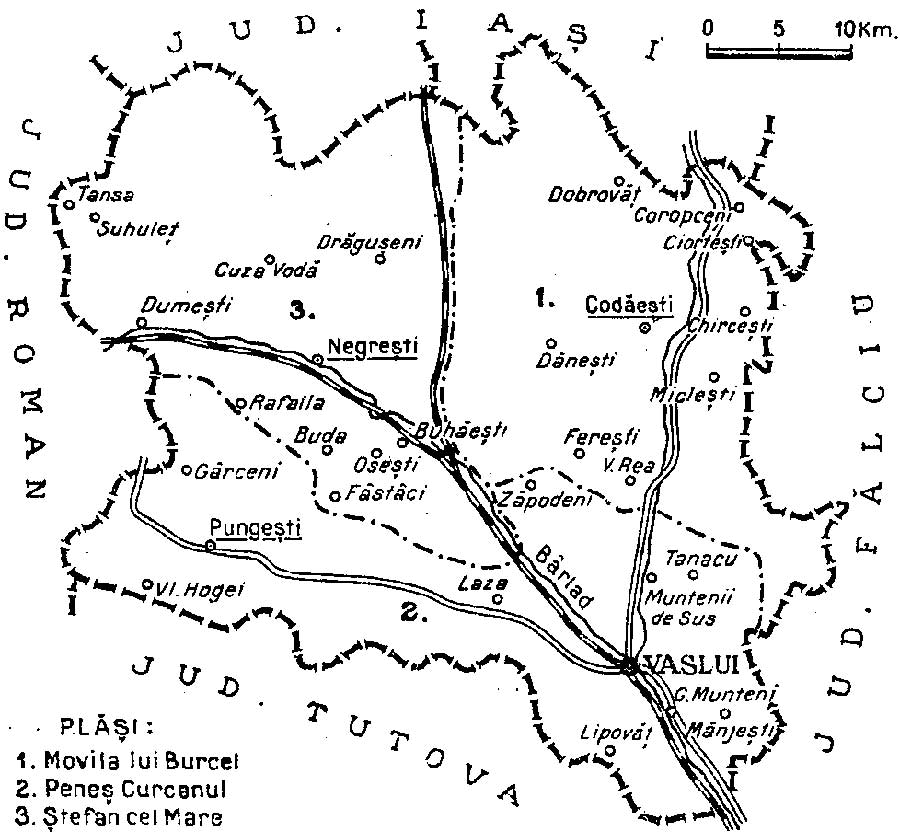
Map of Vaslui County as constituted in 1938.

The county was originally divided administratively into four districts (plăși):

1. Plasa Crasna, headquartered at Crasna
2. Plasa Racova, headquartered at Racova
3. Plasa Stemnic

Subsequently, the territory of the county was reorganized, being divided into three different districts:

1. Plasa Movila lui Burcel, headquartered at Codăești
2. Plasa Peneș Curcanul, headquartered at Pungești
3. Plasa Ștefan cel Mare, headquartered at Negrești

=== Population ===
According to the 1930 census data, the county population was 139,503 inhabitants, 93.4% Romanians, 3.6% Jews, 2.3% Romanies, as well as other minorities. From the religious point of view, the population was 95.7% Eastern Orthodox, 3.6% Jewish, 0.2% Roman Catholic, as well as other minorities.

==== Urban population ====
In 1930, the county's urban population was 15,310 inhabitants, comprising 72.5% Romanians, 21.4% Jews, 3.0% Romanies, as well as other minorities. From the religious point of view, the urban population was composed of 76.4% Eastern Orthodox, 21.4% Jewish, 1.1% Roman Catholic, as well as other minorities.
