= Poiana =

Poiana may refer to:

== Places ==
=== Italy ===
- Pojana Maggiore (Poiana Maggiore), a town in the province of Vicenza, Veneto
- Villa Pojana, or Poiana, a patrician villa in Pojana Maggiore, a UNESCO World Heritage site

=== Moldova ===
- Poiana, Șoldănești, a commune in Șoldănești district
- Poiana, a village in Hincăuți Commune, Edineț district
- Poiana, a village in Boghenii Noi Commune, Ungheni district

=== Romania ===
==== Inhabited places ====
- Poiana, Dâmbovița, a commune in Dâmbovița County
- Poiana, Galați, a commune in Galați County
- Poiana, a village in Bistra, Alba
- Poiana, a village in Bucium, Alba
- Poiana, a village in Sohodol Commune, Alba County
- Poiana, a village in Vârfurile Commune, Arad County
- Poiana, a village in Colonești, Bacău
- Poiana, a village in Livezi, Bacău
- Poiana, a village in Mărgineni, Bacău
- Poiana, a village in Motoșeni Commune, Bacău County
- Poiana, a village in Negri, Bacău
- Poiana, a village in Criștioru de Jos Commune, Bihor County
- Poiana, a village in Tăuteu Commune, Bihor County
- Poiana, a village in Brăești, Botoșani
- Poiana, a village in Flămânzi Town, Botoșani County
- Poiana, a village in Cristinești Commune, Botoșani County
- Poiana, a village in Vorona, Botoșani
- Poiana, a village in Buchin Commune, Caraș-Severin County
- Poiana (Poiana de Arieș), a village which became a neighbourhood of Turda, Cluj County
- Poiana, a village in Ovidiu Town, Constanța County
- Poiana, a village in Turburea Commune, Gorj County
- Poiana, a village in Balșa Commune, Hunedoara County
- Poiana, a village in Ciulnița Commune, Ialomița County
- Poiana, a village in Deleni, Iași
- Poiana, a village in Schitu Duca Commune, Iași County
- Poiana, a village in Căzănești, Mehedinți
- Poiana, a village in Brusturi, Neamț
- Poiana, a village in Dulcești Commune, Neamț County
- Poiana, a village in Grințieș Commune, Neamț County
- Poiana, a village in Negrești, Neamț
- Poiana, a village in Pângărați Commune, Neamț County
- Poiana, a village in Radomirești Commune, Olt County
- Poiana, a village in Comarnic Commune, Prahova County
- Poiana, a village in Dolhasca Town, Suceava County
- Poiana, a village in Zvoriștea Commune, Suceava County
- Poiana, a village in Ciuperceni, Teleorman
- Poiana, a village in Negrești Town, Vaslui County
- Poiana, a village in Vrâncioaia Commune, Vrancea County
- Poiana, a village in Perișani Commune, Vâlcea County
- Poiana Aiudului, a village in Livezile, Alba
- Poiana Ampoiului, a village in Meteș Commune, Alba County
- Poiana Blenchii, a commune in Sălaj County
- Poiana Botizii, a village in Băiuț Commune, Maramureș County
- Poiana Brașov, a ski resort near Brașov
- Poiana Câmpina, a commune in Prahova County
- Poiana Codrului, a village in Crucișor Commune, Satu Mare County
- Poiana Copăceni, a village in Gura Vitioarei Commune, Prahova County
- Poiana Crăcăoani, a village in Crăcăoani Commune, Neamț County
- Poiana Cristei, a commune in Vrancea County
- Poiana cu Cetate, a village in Grajduri Commune, Iași County
- Poiana de Sus, a village in Țibana Commune, Iași County
- Poiana Fagului, a village in Lunca de Jos Commune, Harghita County
- Poiana Fântânii, a village in Argetoaia Commune, Dolj County
- Poiana Frății, a village in Frata Commune, Cluj County
- Poiana Galdei, a village in Galda de Jos Commune, Alba County
- Poiana Gruii, a village in Gruia, Mehedinți
- Poiana Horea, a village in Beliș Commune, Cluj County
- Poiana Humei, a village in Oniceni Commune, Neamț County
- Poiana Lacului, a commune in Argeș County
- Poiana Largului, a village in Poiana Teiului Commune, Neamț County
- Poiana lui Alexa, a village in Pușcași Commune, Vaslui County
- Poiana lui Stângă, a village in Vânătorii Mici Commune, Giurgiu County
- Poiana Lungă, a village in Cornereva Commune, Caraș-Severin County
- Poiana Măgura, a village in Sărmășag Commune, Sălaj County
- Poiana Mănăstirii, a village in Țibana Commune, Iași County
- Poiana Mărului, a village in Zăvoi Commune, Caraș-Severin County
- Poiana Mărului, a village in Ceplenița Commune, Iași County
- Poiana Mărului, a village in Mălini Commune, Suceava County
- Poiana Mare, a commune in Olt County
- Poiana Mare, a village in Bătrâni Commune, Prahova County
- Poiana Mărului, a commune in Brașov County
- Poiana Micului, a village in Mănăstirea Humorului Commune, Suceava County
- Poiana Mierlei, a village in Drajna Commune, Prahova County
- Poiana Negrii, a village in Dorna Candrenilor Commune, Suceava County
- Poiana Negustorului, a village in Blăgești, Bacău
- Poiana Onții, a village in Cristolț Commune, Sălaj County
- Poiana Pietrei, a village in Dragomirești, Vaslui
- Poiana Pletari, a village in Chiliile Commune, Buzău County
- Poiana Răchițelii, a village in Cerbăl Commune, Hunedoara County
- Poiana Sărată, a village in Oituz Commune, Bacău County
- Poiana Șcheii, a village in Șcheia, Iași
- Poiana-Seciuri, a village in Bustuchin Commune, Gorj County
- Poiana Sibiului, a commune in Sibiu County
- Poiana Stampei, a commune in Suceava County
- Poiana Stoichii, a village in Vintileasca Commune, Vrancea County
- Poiana Țapului, a village in Bușteni Town, Prahova County
- Poiana Tășad, a village in Copăcel town, Bihor County
- Poiana Teiului, a commune in Neamț County
- Poiana Trestiei, a village in Cosminele Commune, Prahova County
- Poiana Ursului, a village in Meteș Commune, Alba County
- Poiana Vadului, a commune in Alba County
- Poiana Vâlcului, a village in Mânzălești Commune, Buzău County
- Poiana Vărbilău, a village in Vărbilău Commune, Prahova County
- Poieni, Cluj, a commune in Cluj County
- Poieni, a village in Blandiana Commune, Alba County
- Poieni, a village in Bucium, Alba
- Poieni, a village in Vidra, Alba
- Poieni, a village in Parincea Commune, Bacău County
- Poieni, a village in Roșiori, Bacău
- Poieni, a village in Târgu Ocna Town, Bacău County
- Poieni, a village in Beriu Commune, Hunedoara County
- Poieni, a village in Densuș Commune, Hunedoara County
- Poieni, a village in Schitu Duca Commune, Iași County
- Poieni, a village in Piatra Șoimului Commune, Neamț County
- Poieni, a village in Pietroasa, Timiș
- Poieni-Solca, a commune in Suceava County
- Poieni-Suceava, a village in Udești Commune, Suceava County

==== Mountains ====
- Poiana Ruscă Mountains, a subdivision of the Romanian Carpathians

==== Rivers ====
- Poiana, a tributary of the Sohodol in Alba County
- Poiana, a tributary of the Mara in Maramureș County
- Poiana, a tributary of the Prut in Botoșani County
- Poiana, a tributary of the Telcișor in Bistrița-Năsăud County
- Poiana, a tributary of the Vorona in Botoșani County
- Poiana (Someș), a tributary of the Someș in Maramureș and Sălaj Counties
- Poiana (Topa), a tributary of the Topa in Bihor County
- Poiana Lungă, a tributary of the Dobrovăț in Iași County
- Poiana Mică, a tributary of the Rudăreasa in Vâlcea County

== Ukraine ==
- Poiana, the Romanian name of Poliana, Dniester Raion, Chernivtsi Oblast
- Poieni, the Romanian name of Bukivka, Chernivtsi Raion, Chernivtsi Oblast
- Poieni, the Romanian name of Polyana, Turiatka commune, Hlyboka Raion, Chernivtsi Raion

== Other uses ==
- Poiana (genus), commonly known as oyans or African linsangs, a genus of the mammalian family Viverridae
  - Central African linsang (Poiana richardsonii), a species of linsang
  - West African linsang (Poiana leightoni), a species of linsang
- Poiana (brand), a brand of food in Romania owned by Kraft Foods

== See also ==
- Poienești, a commune in Vaslui County, Romania
- Poienii de Jos and Poienii de Sus, villages in Buntești Commune, Bihor County
- Poienile (disambiguation)
