= Bozieni =

Bozieni may refer to several places in Romania and one in Moldova.

== Romania ==
- Bozieni, Neamț, a commune in Neamț County
- Bozieni, a village administered by Săveni town, Botoșani County
- Bozieni, a village in Fântânele Commune, Prahova County
- Bozienii de Sus, a village in Ruginoasa Commune, Neamț County
- Bozieni (river), a tributary of the Bârlad in Neamț County

== Moldova ==
- Bozieni, Hîncești, a commune in Hîncești district, Moldova
