= Rebricea (river) =

- Location within Romania

Location
- Country: Romania
- Counties: Iași, Vaslui
- Villages: Cărbunari, Grajduri, Scânteia, Rebricea

Physical characteristics
- Mouth: Bârlad
  - location: Vulturești
  - coordinates: 46.7891°N 27.5639°E
- Length: 27 km (17 mi)
- Basin size: 158 km^{2} (61 sq mi)

Basin features
- Progression: Bârlad→ Siret→ Danube→ Black Sea
- Tributaries
  - left: Cocora, Rebricea Seacă, Bolați
  - right: Crăciunești

The Rebricea is a left tributary of the river Bârlad in Romania. It discharges into the Bârlad near Vulturești. Its length is 27 km (17 mi) and its basin size 158 km^{2} (61 sq mi).
