= Bolați =

- Location within Romania

Location
- Country: Romania
- Counties: Iași, Vaslui
- Villages: Tufeștii de Sus, Drăxeni, Bolați

Physical characteristics
- Mouth: Rebricea
  - coordinates: 46.8302°N 27.5657°E
- Length: 14 km (8.7 mi)
- Basin size: 36 km^{2} (14 sq mi)

Basin features
- Progression: Rebricea→ Bârlad→ Siret→ Danube→ Black Sea
- River code: XII.1.78.11.3

The Bolați (also: Drăxeni) is a left tributary of the river Rebricea in Romania. It flows into the Rebricea in Rateșu Cuzei. Its length is 14 km (8.7 mi) and its basin size is 36 km^{2} (14 sq mi).
