= Humăria =

- Location within Romania

Location
- Country: Romania
- Counties: Iași County
- Villages: Șcheia, Drăgușeni

Physical characteristics
- Mouth: Stavnic
  - coordinates: 46.8816°N 27.4841°E
- Length: 10 km (6.2 mi)
- Basin size: 22 km^{2} (8.5 sq mi)

Basin features
- Progression: Stavnic→ Bârlad→ Siret→ Danube→ Black Sea
- River code: XII.1.78.10.3

The Humăria is a left tributary of the river Stavnic in eastern Romania. It flows into the Stavnic in Frenciugi. The Stavnic is a tributary of the Bârlad, which in turn is a tributary of the Siret, which joins the Danube. Its length is 10 km (6.2 mi) and its basin size is 22 km^{2} (8.5 sq mi).
