= Fâstâca =

- Location within Romania

Location
- Country: Romania
- Counties: Vaslui County
- Villages: Fâstâci, Bălești

Physical characteristics
- Mouth: Stemnic
  - location: Bălești
  - coordinates: 46.7214°N 27.5341°E
- Length: 11 km (6.8 mi)
- Basin size: 29 km^{2} (11 sq mi)

Basin features
- Progression: Stemnic→ Bârlad→ Siret→ Danube→ Black Sea

The Fâstâca is a right tributary of the river Stemnic in Romania. It flows into the Stemnic in Bălești. Its length is 11 km (6.8 mi) and its basin size is 29 km^{2} (11 sq mi).
