= Stavnic =

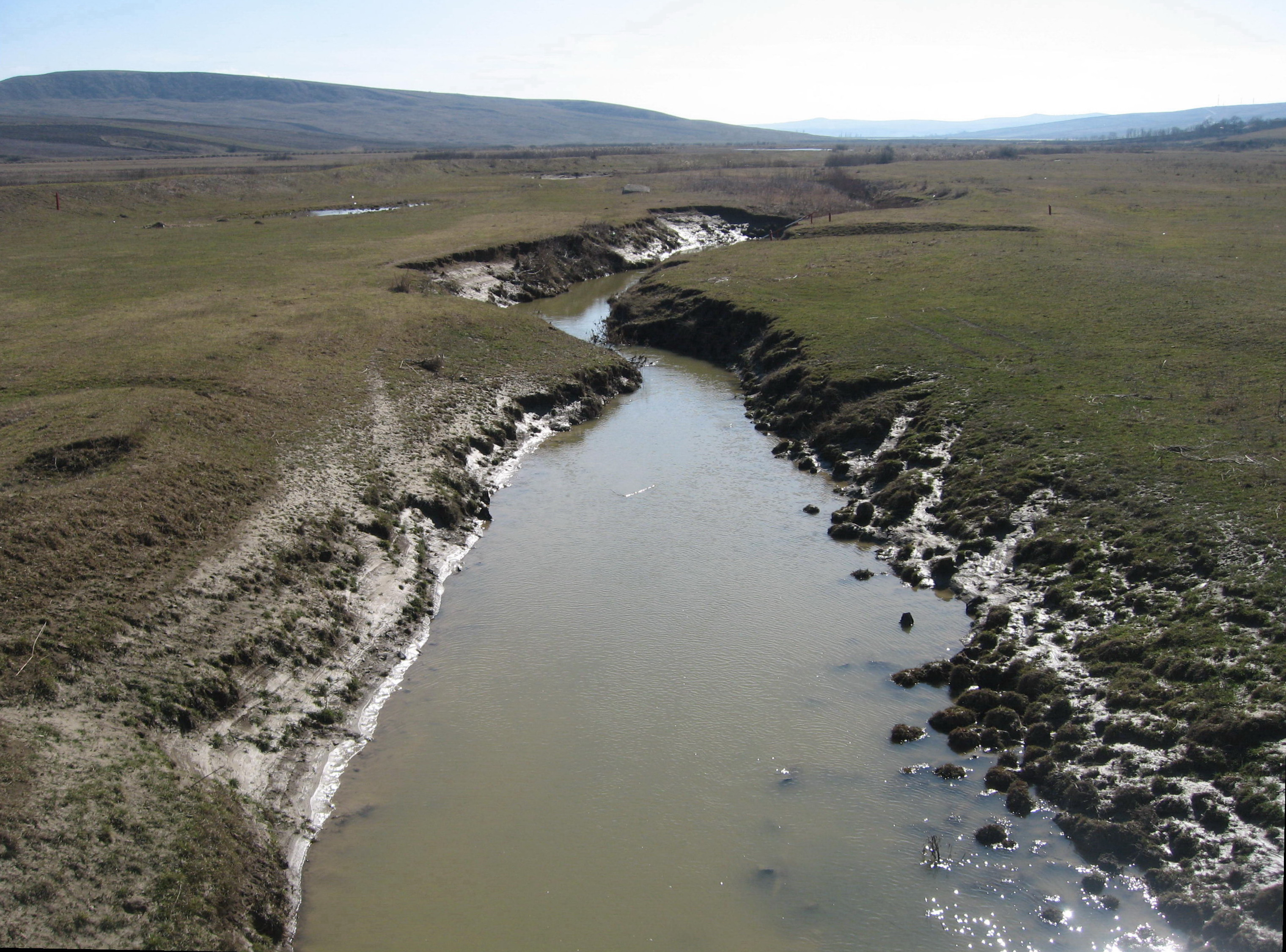

- Location within Romania

Location
- Country: Romania
- Counties: Iași, Vaslui
- Villages: Schitu Stavnic, Hadâmbu, Frenciugi, Parpanița

Physical characteristics
- Mouth: Bârlad
  - location: Vulturești
  - coordinates: 46.8031°N 27.4972°E
- Length: 46 km (29 mi)
- Basin size: 212 km^{2} (82 sq mi)

Basin features
- Progression: Bârlad→ Siret→ Danube→ Black Sea
- Tributaries
  - left: Humăria
  - right: Stăvnicel, Urșița

The Stavnic is a left tributary of the river Bârlad in Romania. It discharges into the Bârlad in Vulturești. The Căzănești Dam is located on the Stavnic. Its length is 46 km (29 mi) and its basin size 212 km^{2} (82 sq mi).
