= Sasova =

Sasova may refer to several places in central and south-east Europe:

- Šašová - a village in Bardejov District in north-east Slovakia
- Sasova - a village in Turkey
- Sasova, a village in Rebricea Commune, Vaslui County, Romania
