= Lohan (river) =

- Location within Romania

Location
- Country: Romania
- Counties: Vaslui County
- Villages: Fundătura, Bobești, Crețești, Curteni, Oltenești, Târzii

Physical characteristics
- Mouth: Crasna
  - location: Pâhna
  - coordinates: 46.5469°N 27.8380°E
- Length: 35 km (22 mi)
- Basin size: 112 km^{2} (43 sq mi)

Basin features
- Progression: Crasna→ Bârlad→ Siret→ Danube→ Black Sea

The Lohan is a left tributary of the river Crasna in Romania. It flows into the Crasna near Pâhna. Its length is 35 km (22 mi) and its basin size is 112 km^{2} (43 sq mi).
