= Bogdana =

Bogdana may refer to the Bogdana Monastery, an Orthodox Christian monastery in Rădăuți, Suceava County, Romania. It shouldn't be confused with Bogdana Monastery, in Ștefan cel Mare Commune, Bacău County.

Bogdana may also refer to several places in Romani, listed by county:

== Villages ==
- Bogdana, a village in Ștefan cel Mare Commune, Bacău County
- Bogdana, a village in Dragoș Vodă Commune, Călărași County
- Bogdana, a village in Buciumi Commune, Sălaj County
- Bogdana, a commune in Teleorman County
- Bogdana, a commune in Vaslui County
- Bogdana-Voloseni, a village in Stănilești Commune, Vaslui County
- Odaia-Bogdana, a village in Fălciu Commune, Vaslui County

== Water courses ==
- Bogdana, a tributary of the Trotuș in Bacău County
- Bogdana, a tributary of the Suceava in Suceava County
- Bogdana (Simila), a tributary of the Simila in Vaslui County

== See also ==
- Bohdana
