= Urșița =

- Location within Romania

Location
- Country: Romania
- Counties: Iași County
- Villages: Urșița, Mironeasa

Physical characteristics
- Mouth: Stavnic
  - coordinates: 46.9445°N 27.4664°E
- Length: 13 km (8.1 mi)
- Basin size: 41 km^{2} (16 sq mi)

Basin features
- Progression: Stavnic→ Bârlad→ Siret→ Danube→ Black Sea
- River code: XII.1.78.10.2

The Urșița is a right tributary of the river Stavnic in Romania. It flows into the Stavnic in Cioca-Boca. Its length is 13 km (8.1 mi) and its basin size is 41 km^{2} (16 sq mi).
