= Poenaru =

Poenaru (Romanian pronunciation: [po.eˈnaru]), Poienaru are the Romanian surnames of:

- Constantin Poenaru (1842–1912), Romanian general
- Dorin N. Poenaru (born 1936), Romanian nuclear physicist and engineer
- Gheorghe Poenaru (born 1956), Romanian footballer
- Gheorghe Poenaru-Bordea (1937–2004), Romanian historian and numismatist
- Ilie Poenaru (born 1976), Romanian football manager and player
- Petrache Poenaru (1799–1875), Romanian inventor
  - Petrache Poenaru metro station, metro station in Bucharest
- Sorin Poenaru (born 1938), Romanian Olympic fencer
- Valentin Poénaru (born 1932), Romanian-French mathematician
  - Poénaru conjecture

== See also ==
- Poiana (disambiguation)
- Poienari (disambiguation)
