= Sacovăț =

Tributary of the river Bârlad in Romania

- Location within Romania

Location
- Country: Romania
- Counties: Iași, Vaslui
- Villages: Mădârjac, Țibana, Țibănești

Physical characteristics
- Mouth: Bârlad
  - location: Todirești
  - coordinates: 46.8352°N 27.4122°E
- Length: 54 km (34 mi)
- Basin size: 314 km^{2} (121 sq mi)
- Discharge
  - average: 0,587 m3/s

Basin features
- Progression: Bârlad→ Siret→ Danube→ Black Sea

The Sacovăț is a left tributary of the river Bârlad in Romania. It discharges into the Bârlad near Todirești. The Tungujei Dam is located on the Sacovăț. Its length is 54 km (34 mi) and its basin size 314 km^{2} (121 sq mi).

== Tributaries ==
The following rivers are tributaries to the river Sacovăț:

- Left: Pârâul Pietros, Frumușica, Răchitoasa (or Ricitna), Țibana, Zoi
- Right: Balta Neagră, Veja (or Corniș, or Hărmănaș), Gârla Arămii, Călina, Durăceasa
