= Tufeștii =

Tufeștii may refer to one of two places in Romania:

- Tufeștii de Jos, a village in Rebricea Commune, Vaslui County
- Tufeștii de Sus, a village in Scânteia Commune, Iași County
