= Ibana (river) =

- Location within Romania

Location
- Country: Romania
- Counties: Vaslui County
- Villages: Mânzați, Ibănești, Suseni

Physical characteristics
- Mouth: Simila
  - coordinates: 46.3387°N 27.6829°E
- Length: 21 km (13 mi)
- Basin size: 51 km^{2} (20 sq mi)

Basin features
- Progression: Simila→ Bârlad→ Siret→ Danube→ Black Sea

The Ibana is a right tributary of the river Simila in Romania. It flows into the Simila in Băcani. Its length is 21 km (13 mi) and its basin size is 51 km^{2} (20 sq mi).

== Hydronymy ==
The name of the river derives from the Slavic name "Liubana", meaning "valley of love".
