= Crăciunești (disambiguation) =

Crăciunești may refer to several places in Romania:

- Crăciunești, a commune in Mureș County
- Crăciunești, a village in Cobia Commune, Dâmbovița County
- Crăciunești, a village in Băița Commune, Hunedoara County
- Crăciunești, a village in Bocicoiu Mare Commune, Maramureș County and connected to the Kretshnif Hasidic Dynasty
- Crăciunești, a village in Rebricea Commune, Vaslui County
