= Bălțățeni =

Bălțățeni or Băltățeni may refer to several villages in Romania:

- Băltățeni, a village in Băcani Commune, Vaslui County
- Bălțățeni, a village in Tomșani Commune, Vâlcea County
