= Curteni =

Curteni may refer to several villages in Romania:

- Curteni, a village in Sântana de Mureș Commune, Mureș County
- Curteni, a village in Oltenești Commune, Vaslui County
