= Simila =

- Location within Romania

Location
- Country: Romania
- Counties: Vaslui County
- Villages: Alexandru Vlahuță, Băcani

Physical characteristics
- Mouth: Bârlad
  - location: Simila
  - coordinates: 46.2469°N 27.7010°E
- Length: 44 km (27 mi)
- Basin size: 267 km^{2} (103 sq mi)

Basin features
- Progression: Bârlad→ Siret→ Danube→ Black Sea
- Tributaries
  - left: Similișoara, Bogdana
  - right: Ibana

The Simila is a right tributary of the river Bârlad in Romania. It discharges into the Bârlad in the village Simila, near the city of Bârlad. Its length is 44 km (27 mi) and its basin size is 267 km^{2} (103 sq mi).
