= Corozel =

Corozel Corazel
- Location within Romania

Location
- Country: Romania
- Counties: Galați County
- Villages: Corod, Matca, Barcea

Physical characteristics
- Mouth: Bârlad
  - location: Barcea
  - coordinates: 45.7594°N 27.4563°E
- Length: 41 km (25 mi)
- Basin size: 195 km^{2} (75 sq mi)

Basin features
- Progression: Bârlad→ Siret→ Danube→ Black Sea
- Tributaries
  - left: Valea Seacă
  - right: Tăploani, Corozelul Sec

The Corozel (also: Corazel) is a left tributary of the river Bârlad in Romania. It discharges into the Bârlad in Barcea. The basin size of the 41 km (25 mi) long Corozel is 195 km^{2} (75 sq mi).
