= Cocora =

Cocora may refer to:

- Cocora, Ialomița, a commune in Romania
- Cocora, a tributary of the Ialomița in Dâmbovița County, Romania
- Cocora, a tributary of the Rebricea in Iași County, Romania
- Cocora Valley, Colombia
