= Horoiata =

- Location within Romania

Location
- Country: Romania
- Counties: Vaslui County

Physical characteristics
- Source: Tutova Plateau
  - location: Fundu Văii
- Mouth: Bârlad
  - location: Horoiata
  - coordinates: 46.3245°N 27.7651°E
- Length: 29 km (18 mi)
- Basin size: 45 km^{2} (17 sq mi)
- Discharge
  - average: 0.5 m^{3}/s (18 cu ft/s)

Basin features
- Progression: Bârlad→ Siret→ Danube→ Black Sea
- Tributaries
  - left: Bogdănești

The Horoiata is a right tributary of the river Bârlad in Romania. It discharges into the Bârlad near the village Horoiata. It originates in the Tutova Plateau near Fundu Văii. It crosses the localities of Fundu Văii, Căpușneni, Orgoiești, Vișinari, Vlădești, Ulea, Unțești and Horoiata, before joining the Bârlad near Gara Banca. Its length is 29 km (18 mi) and its basin size is 45 km^{2} (17 sq mi).
