= Jaravăț =

Jaravăț Jăravăț
- Location within Romania

Location
- Country: Romania
- Counties: Galați, Vaslui
- Villages: Docăneasa, Grivița

Physical characteristics
- Mouth: Bârlad
  - location: Grivița
  - coordinates: 46.1736°N 27.6321°E
- Length: 29 km (18 mi)
- Basin size: 152 km^{2} (59 sq mi)

Basin features
- Progression: Bârlad→ Siret→ Danube→ Black Sea
- Tributaries
  - left: Bălăbănești

The Jaravăț or Jăravăț is a left tributary of the river Bârlad in Romania. It discharges into the Bârlad in Grivița. Its length is 29 km (18 mi) and its basin size is 152 km^{2} (59 sq mi).
