= Gârceneanca =

- Location within Romania

Location
- Country: Romania
- Counties: Vaslui County
- Villages: Gârceni, Pungești

Physical characteristics
- Mouth: Racova
  - location: Pungești
  - coordinates: 46.7084°N 27.3513°E
- Length: 10 km (6.2 mi)
- Basin size: 36 km^{2} (14 sq mi)

Basin features
- Progression: Racova→ Bârlad→ Siret→ Danube→ Black Sea

The Gârceneanca is a left tributary of the river Racova in Romania. It flows into the Racova in Pungești. Its length is 10 km (6.2 mi) and its basin size is 36 km^{2} (14 sq mi). The Gârceneanca Dam is located on this river.
