= Domnița =

Domnița may refer to:

- Domnița, the former name of Mihail Kogălniceanu village in Râmnicelu, Brăila Commune, Brăila County, Romania
- Domnița, a village in Țibana Commune, Iași County, Romania
