= Crasna (Bârlad) =

- Location within Romania

Location
- Country: Romania
- Counties: Iași, Vaslui
- Villages: Rotăria, Dolhești, Podu Oprii, Tăbălăiești, Tătărăni, Crăsnășeni, Vinețești, Crasna

Physical characteristics
- Mouth: Bârlad
  - coordinates: 46.5131°N 27.8128°E
- Length: 61 km (38 mi)
- Basin size: 527 km^{2} (203 sq mi)
- Discharge
  - location: *
  - average: 0.454 m^{3}/s (16.0 cu ft/s)

Basin features
- Progression: Bârlad→ Siret→ Danube→ Black Sea
- Tributaries
  - left: Cetățuia, Hrușca, Lohan
  - right: Brădicești, Burghina

The Crasna is a left tributary of the river Bârlad in Romania. It discharges into the Bârlad near the village Crasna. The Mânjești dam is located on the Crasna. Its length is 61 km (38 mi) and its basin size is 527 km^{2} (203 sq mi).
