= Bogdana (Simila) =

- Location within Romania

Location
- Country: Romania
- Counties: Vaslui County
- Villages: Bogdana, Coroiești, Cepești

Physical characteristics
- Mouth: Simila
  - coordinates: 46.3207°N 27.6851°E
- Length: 35 km (22 mi)
- Basin size: 91 km^{2} (35 sq mi)

Basin features
- Progression: Simila→ Bârlad→ Siret→ Danube→ Black Sea

The Bogdana is a left tributary of the river Simila in Romania. It flows into the Simila in Băcani. Its length is 35 km (22 mi) and its basin size is 91 km^{2} (35 sq mi).
