= Ruginoasa =

Ruginoasa may refer to several places in Romania:

- Ruginoasa, Iași, a commune in Iași County
- Ruginoasa, Neamț, a commune in Neamț County
- Ruginoasa, a village in Valea Iașului Commune, Argeș County
- Ruginoasa, a village in Brăeşti Commune, Buzău County
- Ruginoasa, a village in Cuzăplac Commune, Sălaj County
