= Cozmești =

Cozmești may refer to several places in Romania:

- Cozmești, Iași, a commune in Iași County
- Cozmești, Vaslui, a commune in Vaslui County
- Cozmești, a village in Stolniceni-Prăjescu Commune, Iași County
