= Crăiești (disambiguation) =

Crăiești may refer to several places in Romania:

- Crăiești, a commune in Mureș County
- Crăiești, a village in Stănișești Commune, Bacău County
- Crăiești, a village in Vârlezi Commune, Galați County
- Crăiești, a village in Adămuș Commune, Mureș County
- Crăiești, a village in Bozieni Commune, Neamț County
