= Neculai Alexandru Ursu =

Romanian linguist and philologist

- Born: Neculai Alexandru Ursu; August 3, 1926; Boroșești, Iași County, Romania
- Died: May 14, 2016 (aged 89); Iași, Romania
- Occupations: Linguist; philologist; literary historian

Academic background
- Education: Alexandru Ioan Cuza University
- Thesis: Formarea terminologiei științifice românești (1967)

Neculai Alexandru Ursu (August 3, 1926 – May 14, 2016) was a Romanian linguist, philologist, and literary historian. He graduated from Alexandru Ioan Cuza University and earned his doctorate in philology in 1967 for his work Formarea terminologiei științifice românești (Formation of the Romanian scientific terminology). In 2013, Ursu became a corresponding member of the Romanian Academy.
