= Poenari =

Poenari may refer to several places in Romania:

- Poenari, a village in Ulmi Commune, Giurgiu County
- Poenari, a district in the city of Râmnicu Vâlcea, Vâlcea County
- Poenari Castle, Vlad III the Impaler's castle
- Poenari, a small handmade fountain pens factory in Romania.

== See also ==
- Poienari (disambiguation)
