= Ipatele =

- Commune
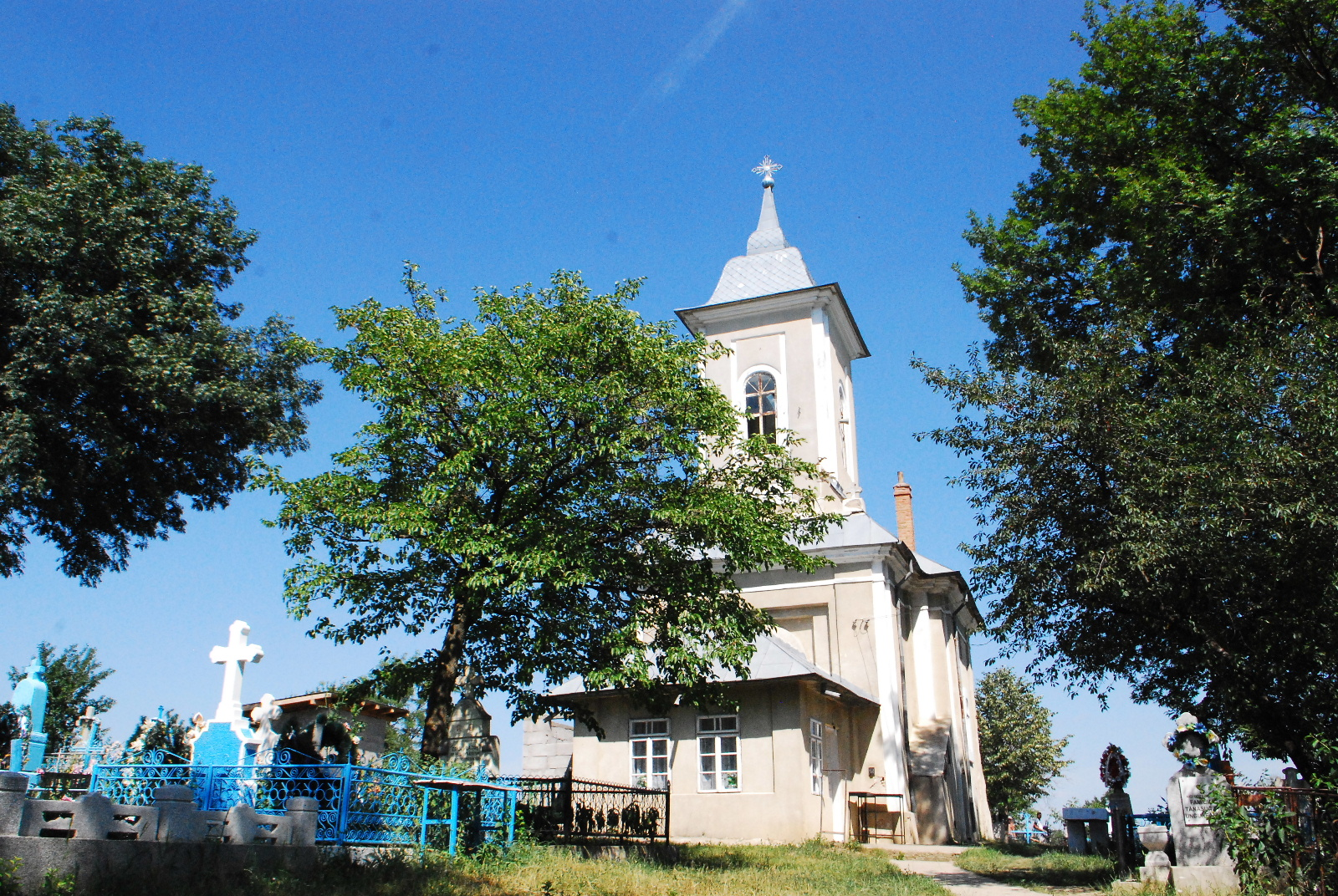
- Saint Nicholas Church in Bâcu

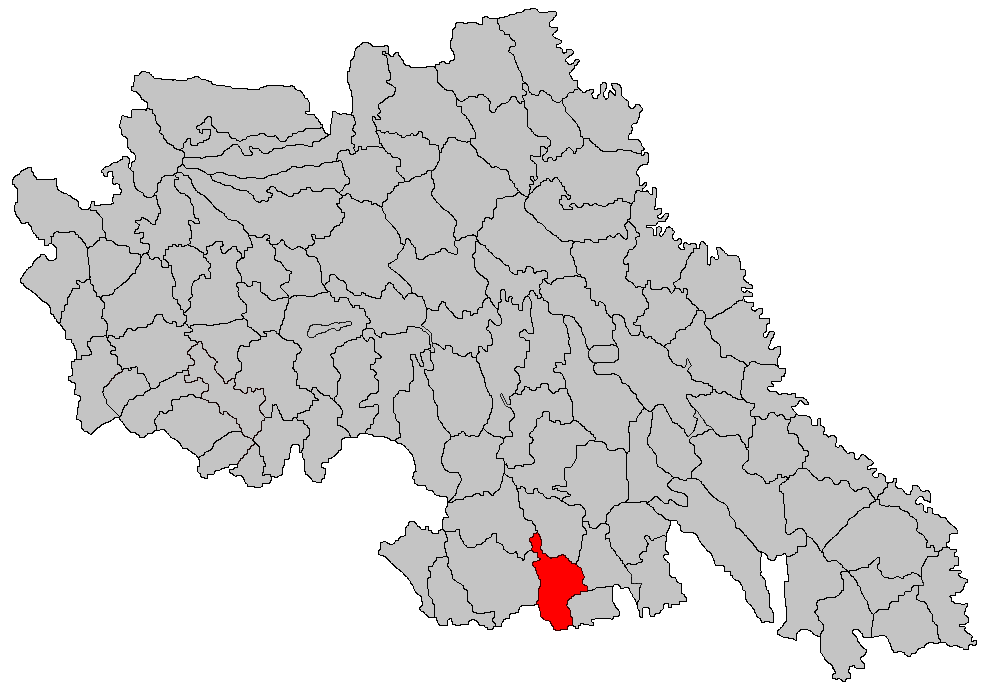
- Location in Iași County

- Location in Romania
- Coordinates: 46°55′N 27°25′E
- Country: Romania
- County: Iași

Government
  - Mayor (2020–2024): Elena-Luminița Lipșa (PSD)
- Area: 46.72 km^{2} (18.04 sq mi)
- Elevation: 247 m (810 ft)
- Population (2021-12-01): 1,463
  - Density: 31.31/km^{2} (81.10/sq mi)
- Time zone: UTC+02:00 (EET)
  - Summer (DST): UTC+03:00 (EEST)
- Postal code: 707265
- Vehicle reg.: IS
- Website: www.comunaipatele.ro

Ipatele is a commune in Iași County, Western Moldavia, Romania. It is composed of four villages: Alexești, Bâcu, Cuza Vodă, and Ipatele.

The commune is located in the southern part of the count y, on the border with Vaslui County. The rivers Stavnic, Ușita, and Velna flow through Ipatele.
