= Stemnic =

- Location within Romania

Location
- Country: Romania
- Counties: Vaslui County
- Villages: Pungești, Ivănești, Pușcași

Physical characteristics
- Mouth: Bârlad
  - coordinates: 46.6693°N 27.6660°E
- Length: 32 km (20 mi)
- Basin size: 150 km^{2} (58 sq mi)

Basin features
- Progression: Bârlad→ Siret→ Danube→ Black Sea
- Tributaries
  - left: Fundul Negru
  - right: Fâstâca

The Stemnic is a right tributary of the river Bârlad in Romania. It discharges into the Bârlad near Bălteni. Its length is 32 km (20 mi) and its basin size is 150 km^{2} (58 sq mi).
