= Bozieni (river) =

- Location within Romania

Location
- Country: Romania
- Counties: Neamț County
- Villages: Săcăleni, Iucșa, Bozieni

Physical characteristics
- Mouth: Bârlad
  - coordinates: 46.8123°N 27.2125°E
- Length: 15 km (9.3 mi)
- Basin size: 38 km^{2} (15 sq mi)

Basin features
- Progression: Bârlad→ Siret→ Danube→ Black Sea

The Bozieni is a left tributary of the river Bârlad in Romania. It flows into the Bârlad near Cuci. Its length is 15 km (9.3 mi) and its basin size is 38 km^{2} (15 sq mi).
