= Velna (river) =

River in Romania

- Location within Romania

Location
- Country: Romania
- Counties: Iași, Vaslui
- Villages: Ipatele, Alexești

Physical characteristics
- Source
  - coordinates: 46°55′56″N 27°25′14″E
  - elevation: 254 m (833 ft)
- Mouth: Bârlad
  - location: Negrești
  - coordinates: 46°50′02″N 27°26′34″E
  - elevation: 118 m (387 ft)
- Length: 13 km (8.1 mi)
- Basin size: 38 km^{2} (15 sq mi)

Basin features
- Progression: Bârlad→ Siret→ Danube→ Black Sea
- River code: XII.1.78.9

The Velna is a left tributary of the river Bârlad in Romania. It crosses the village of Ipatele and joins the Bârlad near Negrești. Its length is 13 km (8.1 mi) and its basin size 38 km^{2} (15 sq mi).
