= Racova (Bârlad) =

Tributary of the river Bârlad in Romania

- Location within Romania

Location
- Country: Romania
- Counties: Vaslui County
- Villages: Pungești, Ivănești, Pușcași

Physical characteristics
- Mouth: Bârlad
  - coordinates: 46.6251°N 27.7186°E
- Length: 49 km (30 mi)
- Basin size: 329 km^{2} (127 sq mi)

Basin features
- Progression: Bârlad→ Siret→ Danube→ Black Sea
- Tributaries
  - left: Gârceneanca, Hârșova

The Racova is a right tributary of the river Bârlad in Romania. It discharges into the Bârlad near the city of Vaslui. Its length is 49 km (30 mi) and its basin size is 329 km^{2} (127 sq mi). The Pușcași Dam is located on this river.
