= Fâstâci Monastery =

Northern Romanian monastery

Coordinates: 46°44′1.59″N 27°27′1.15″E

Fâstâci Monastery (Mănăstirea Fâstâci) is a monastery in Fâstâci Village, Cozmeşti Commune, Vaslui County. It is in the Moldavia region of northern Romania.

== History ==
The Fâstâci Monastery was founded by the Palade landowners during the 17th century. In 1711, it was dedicated to the Frumoasa Monastery from Iaşi (Jassy), a branch of the "Saint Ecaterina" Monastery on Mount Sinai (in present-day Egypt). It was rebuilt by Lord Mihai Racoviţă Cehan during the 18th century. It was extended and suffered transformations during the 19th century.

19th century

The monastery was given numerous villages and estates by the founder and other lords. During the secularization of the properties in 1863 it had some parts of the following estates:

- Region of Vaslui Fậstici: Curseşti, Bălteni, Rugineşti, Munteneşti, Olăneşti;
- Region of Fălciu: Berezeni, Ghermăneşti, Podoleni, Novac
- Region of Botoşani and from Basarabia: Ciornohal.

During the 19th century, the monastic complex included: the church, the tower of belfry gate, the hegumen houses, the trapeze, the cells, the cabin of beams of the porter, 5 rooms for the kitchen and for the valets, the warehouse with the cellar, the shed for the carriages, the stable for the horses, the barn, the fountain, the flower shop, the wine cellar and a candle mill. Outwardly of the wall of precincts was the cemetery. Between 1856 and 1864, in the cells worked a school of schoolmaster church led by the Greek monks Nicanor and Diomid.

After the secularization of the property, the monastery was supported by the state until 1894 when it was closed.

20th century

The Fâstâci Monastery remained closed after 1894, until it was reopened in 1992, after the Romanian Revolution . Between these years, the monastery's Saint Nicholas Church operated as a parish church; the house of priorship as a vicarage; and the cells for an elementary school, then an orphanage after 1919. It was used like a Common Agricultural Policy—C.A.P. warehouse after 1959.

21st century

The present ensemble includes:

- the "Saint Nicholas" Church (1721).
- the gate tower and the belfry (1808).
- the hegumen houses (1834).
- the precincts wall (1834–1851).
- the cells, for food service and accommodations.

== Fâstâci Monastery ensemble ==
=== Saint Nicholas Church ===
It was founded in 1721 by Lord Mihai Racovita Cehan, on the land of a church of the landowners Palade from the 17th century (a.1693). It suffered some transformations in the 19th century. Between 1850 and 1851it was boarded with Cararra marble, covered in board (initially in shingle), it was remade the interior painting and it was replaced the rood screen by the hegumen Chiril Strichide. As a result of the earthquake from 1940, the plat bands by stone of the doors and of the windows was replaced with the wood cadres, and the verandah has been closed between 1957 and 1959. The interior painting was remade between 1975 and 1977, including the votive portrait of the founder Mihai Racovita cehan vv and of his wife, Lady Ana.

It is a church with three-apse church plane, with narthex overenlarged, with polygonal apses at the exterior and semicircular at the interior, with verandah on the west, with foiled arch archways on the columns of brick. It is guerdon by two massive derricks, octagonal, situated on the nave and the narthex. In the interior, the arching system is formed by two vaults flattened on the verandah, derricks by octagonal section on the nave and narthex, a semi-cap on the altar, it is holding on the vaults in relief.

The front part is structured on two registers, separated by a belt. The superior register present circular niches carved in stone, decorated with vegetable motives, surrounded by square cadres of dent bricks. The inferior register is underlined by a chain trilobite vaults, with a bracket backed on the semi-columned hired and engrossed in the wall. The religious inscription on the west facade carry the Moldovian crown, the dating and the name of the founder, carved in Slavonic language.

It keeps imperial icons from the 18th century, the rood screen, the religious armchair and the cult silverware from the time of hegumen Cyrillic Strychnine.

=== Belfry Tower ===
It was founded in 1808 by the hegumen Ioasaf Gândul, at the principal entrance on the south side, by stone and brick. It was redressed several times, it was consolidated by the parish between 1942 and 1949 and covered with board in 1959, initially in shingle. It was reconstructed during 1995 - 2007 with background funds from the Ministry of the Culture and Cult and from the State Inspectorate in Constructions.

It has a massive tower of square section, with three levels. The carrygeable gate, with the semicircular opening, with baroque border of mortar, is superposed by a circular window at the level two and a rectangular opening at the bells room. The corners of the construction are underlined by lobes on the first floor, hired columns and pilasters at the other levels.

It lodges two bronze bells of epoch: one is dated from 1765, decorated with the emblem of the Moldova crown, and the other is dated from 1769.

=== Abbot House ===
It was founded in 1808 by the hegumen Ioasaf Gândul of stone and brick, with some transformations and additions in 1834,1851,1918–1919,1998. After 1919 it functioned as an orphanage, headquarters for the municipal council and as a vicarage.

The first floor of the building is on cellar, in rectangular plane with verandah felt out, with arches in lever of chimney, in present flumed and with triangular pinion. It has facades with the decorations of classicist inspiration. In the interior it has the rooms arranged symmetrical. Neighboring the building, to south-west it is the chapel, in rectangular plan, with the apse of the altar semicircular, in present it is not functional.

== Precincts Wall ==
"The enclosing Precincts Wall of Fâstâci Monastery" was built in two phases, in 1834 and 1851, grace to the efforts of the hegumens Ioasaf Gândul and Kiril Strichide. It has been crumbled in 1899 on the north-west side, in 1911 on the East side and in 1956 on the west side. It was rebuilt by the parish, between 1957 and 1959, under the shepherd of priest H.Manoilescu.

It has a room with rectangular range, partially lost. It has high wall with buttress, on river stone tied with mortar. The principal access is made under the gate tower, placed on the south side; other two gates, in present lost, was finding on the north and east side.
