= Rafaila =

- Commune
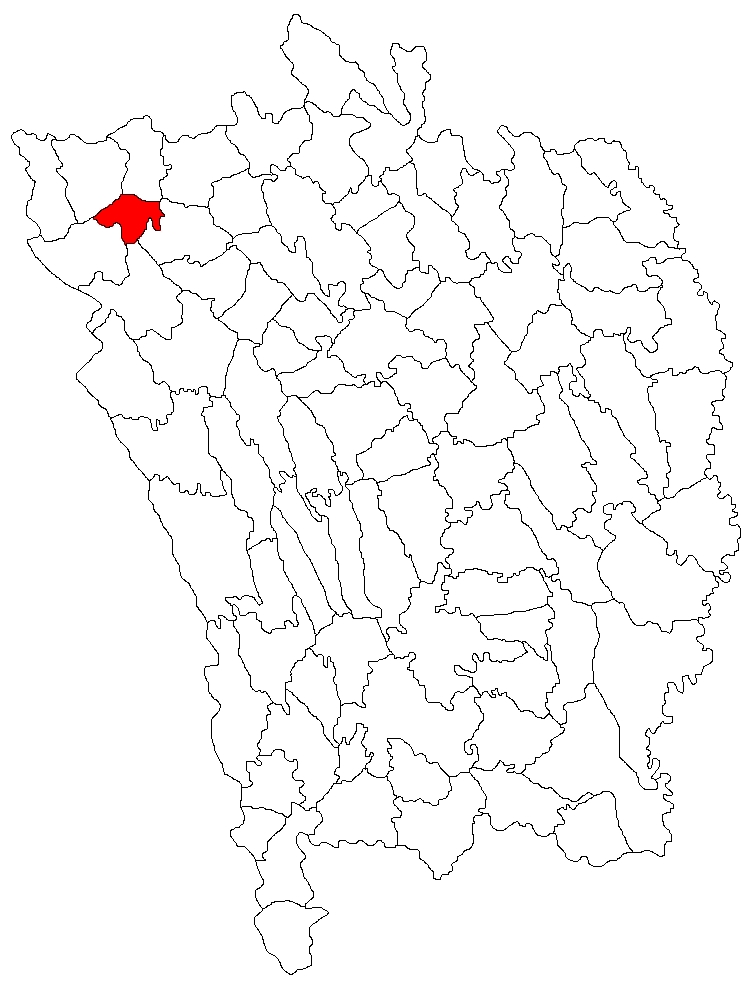
- Location in Vaslui County

- Location in Romania
- Coordinates: 46°49′N 27°21′E
- Country: Romania
- County: Vaslui

Government
  - Mayor (2020–2024): Constantin Fânariu (PSD)
- Area: 27 km^{2} (10 sq mi)
- Elevation: 320 m (1,050 ft)
- Population (2021-12-01): 1,563
  - Density: 58/km^{2} (150/sq mi)
- Time zone: EET/EEST (UTC+2/+3)
- Postal code: 737541
- Area code: +(40) 235
- Vehicle reg.: VS
- Website: www.rafaila.ro

Rafaila is a commune in Vaslui County, Western Moldavia, Romania. It is composed of a single village, Rafaila. This was part of Todirești Commune until 2004, when it was split off.
