= Poienari (disambiguation) =

Poienari may refer to several places in Romania:

- Poienari, a commune in Neamţ County
- Poienari, a village in Hălmagiu Commune, Arad County
- Poienari, a village in Corbeni Commune, Argeș County
- Poienari, a village in Poienarii de Argeș Commune, Argeș County
- Poienari, a village in Poienarii de Muscel Commune, Argeș County
- Poienari, a village in Bumbești-Pițic Commune, Gorj County
- Poienari, a village in Dolhasca town, Suceava County
- Poienari, a village in Ghioroiu Commune, Vâlcea County
- Poienarii Burchii, a commune in Prahova County, and its villages of Poienarii-Rali and Poienarii Vechi
- Poienarii de Argeș, a commune in Argeș County
- Poienarii de Muscel, a commune in Argeș County
- Poienarii Apostoli, a village in Gorgota Commune, Prahova County
- Poienari (Prahova), a tributary of the Prahova in Prahova County
- Poienari, a tributary of the Râul Târgului in Argeș County

== See also ==
- Poenari (disambiguation)
