= Todirești, Vaslui =

Todirești
- Commune
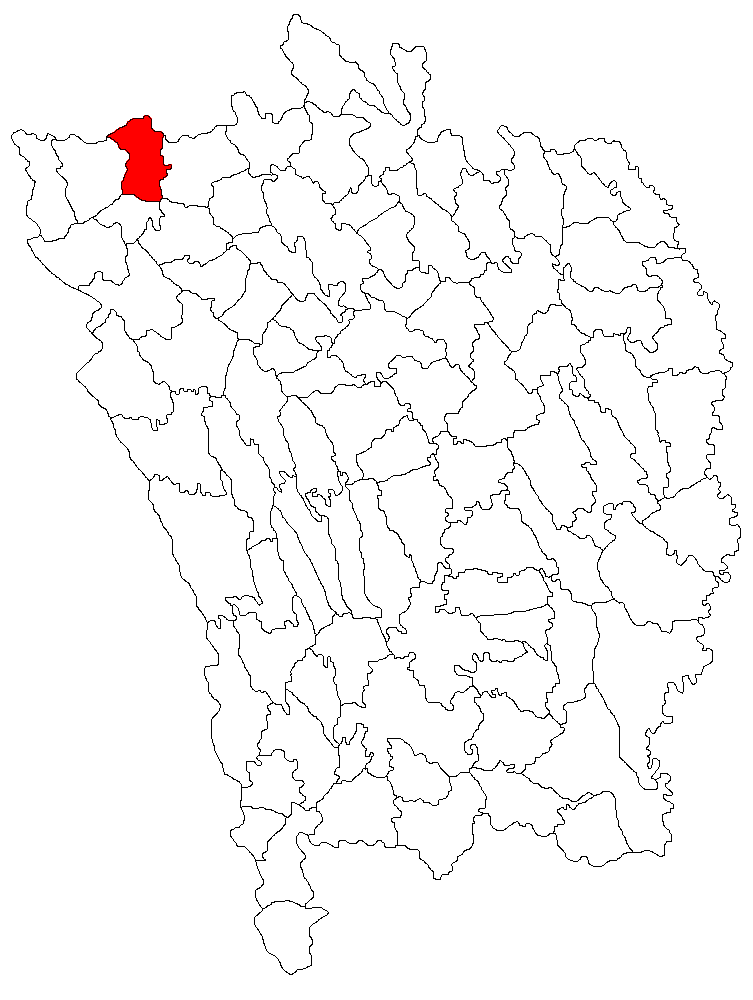
- Location in Vaslui County

- Location in Romania
- Coordinates: 46°51′N 27°22′E
- Country: Romania
- County: Vaslui

Government
  - Mayor (2020–2024): Petrică Simiuc (PSD)
- Population (2021-12-01): 2,958
- Time zone: EET/EEST (UTC+2/+3)
- Vehicle reg.: VS

Todirești is a commune in Vaslui County, Western Moldavia, Romania. It is composed of nine villages: Cotic, Drăgești, Huc, Plopoasa, Siliștea, Sofronești, Todirești, Valea Popii and Viișoara. It also included the village of Rafaila until 2004, when it was split off to form a separate commune.
