= Šašová =

- Municipality
- Flag

- Location of Šašová in the Prešov Region Location of Šašová in Slovakia
- Coordinates: 49.25°N 21.45°E
- Country: Slovakia
- Region: Prešov Region
- District: Bardejov District
- First mentioned: 1352

Area
  - Total: 5.27 km^{2} (2.03 sq mi)
- Elevation: 228 m (748 ft)

Population (2025)
  - Total: 154
- Time zone: UTC+1 (CET)
  - Summer (DST): UTC+2 (CEST)
- Postal code: 861 3
- Area code: +421 54
- Vehicle registration plate (until 2022): BJ
- Website: www.obecsasova.sk

Šašová is a village and municipality in Bardejov District in the Prešov Region of north-east Slovakia.

== History ==
In historical records the village was first mentioned in 1352.

== Geography ==
The municipality lies at an altitude of 228 metres (748 ft) and covers an area of 5.27 km^{2} (2.03 sq mi) (2025).

== Population ==
Population statistic (10 years)
| Year | 1995 | 2005 | 2015 | 2025 |
|---|---|---|---|---|
| Count | 174 | 154 | 148 | 154 |
| Difference | | −11.49% | −3.89% | +4.05% |

Population statistic
| Year | 2024 | 2025 |
|---|---|---|
| Count | 158 | 154 |
| Difference | | −2.53% |

It has a population of 154 people (31 December 2025).

=== Ethnicity ===
Census 2021 (1+ %)
| Ethnicity | Number | Fraction |
|---|---|---|
| Slovak | 150 | 91.46% |
| Romani | 36 | 21.95% |
| Rusyn | 28 | 17.07% |
| Total | 164 | |

In year 2021 was 164 people by ethnicity 150 as Slovak, 36 as Romani, 28 as Rusyn, 1 as Czech and 1 as Polish.

Note on population: The difference values of population numbers in the table "Population statistic" and in the sections "Ethnicity" & "Religion" is caused by the use of various statistical methods.

=== Religion ===
Census 2021 (1+ %)
| Religion | Number | Fraction |
|---|---|---|
| Greek Catholic Church | 124 | 75.61% |
| Roman Catholic Church | 28 | 17.07% |
| None | 10 | 6.1% |
| Total | 164 | |

In year 2021 was 164 people by religion 124 from Greek Catholic Church, 28 from Roman Catholic Church, 10 from None, 1 from Eastern Orthodox Church and 1 from Evangelical Church.
