= Schitu Duca =

- Commune
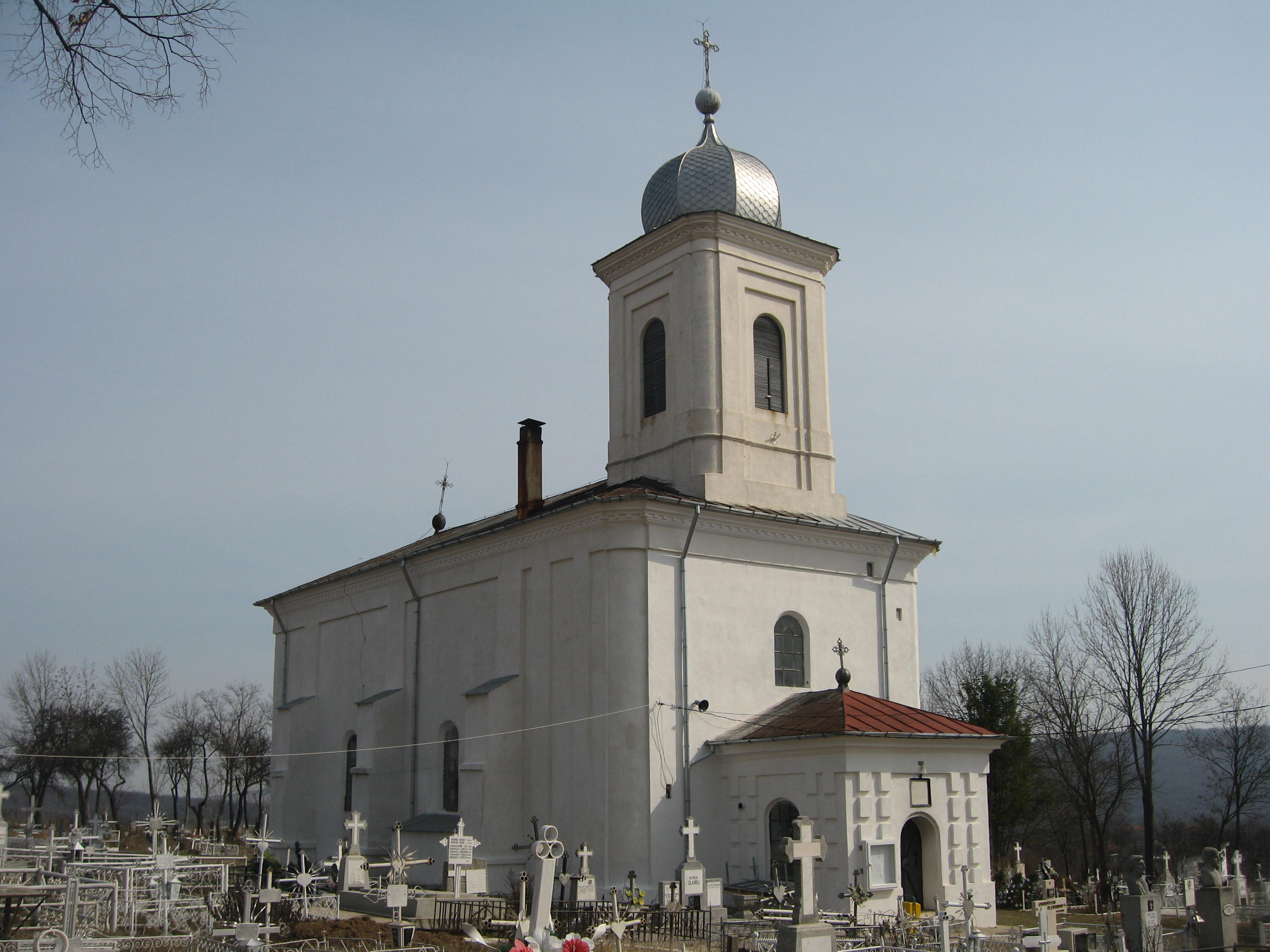
- Saint Nicholas Church in Poieni

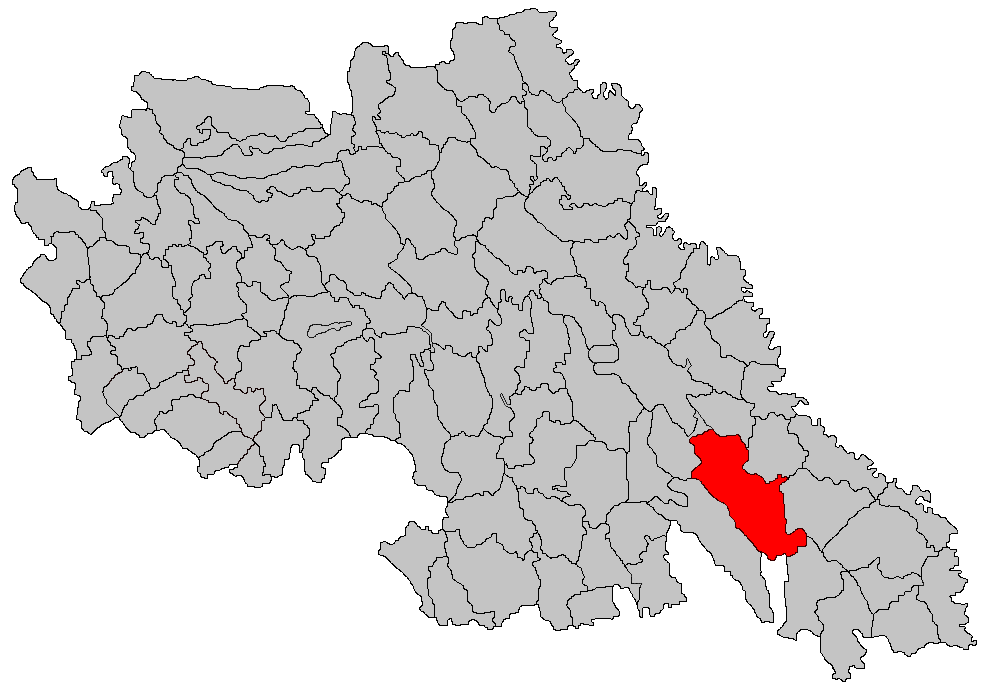
- Location in Iași County

- Location in Romania
- Coordinates: 47°2′N 27°46′E
- Country: Romania
- County: Iași

Government
  - Mayor (2020–2024): Grigore Corciovă (PNL)
- Area: 114.54 km^{2} (44.22 sq mi)
- Elevation: 187 m (614 ft)
- Population (2021-12-01): 3,619
  - Density: 31.60/km^{2} (81.83/sq mi)
- Time zone: UTC+02:00 (EET)
  - Summer (DST): UTC+03:00 (EEST)
- Postal code: 707435
- Area code: +(40) 232
- Vehicle reg.: IS
- Website: comunaschituduca.ro

Schitu Duca is a commune in Iași County, Western Moldavia, Romania, part of the Iași metropolitan area. It is composed of eight villages: Blaga, Dumitreștii Gălății, Pocreaca, Poiana, Poieni, Satu Nou, Schitu Duca, and Slobozia.
