= Poienarii de Argeș =

- Commune
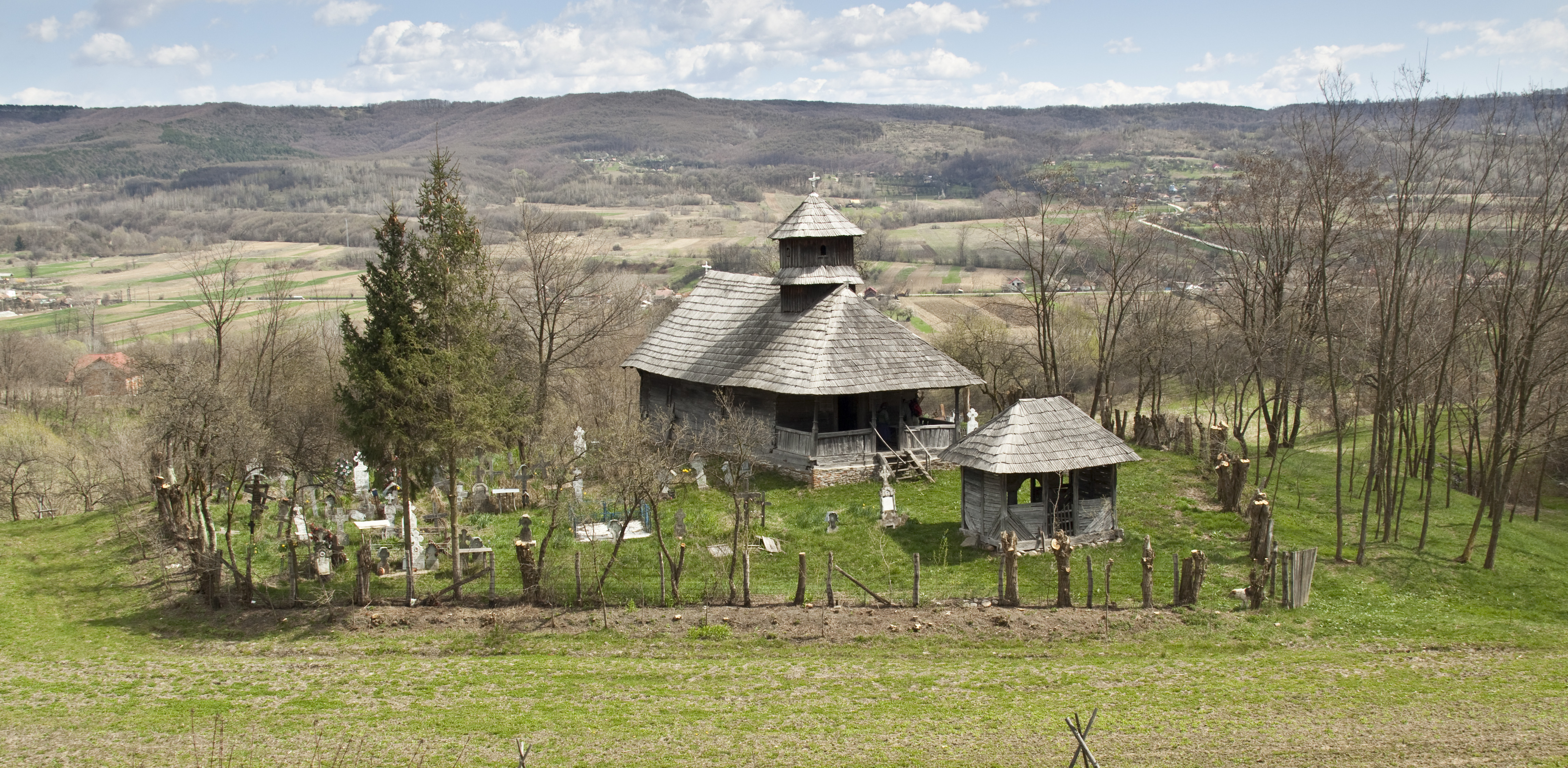
- Wooden church in Ioanicești

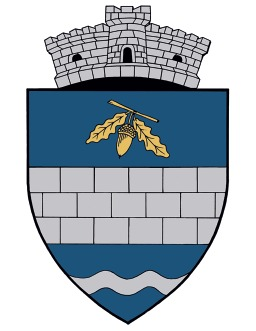
- Coat of arms

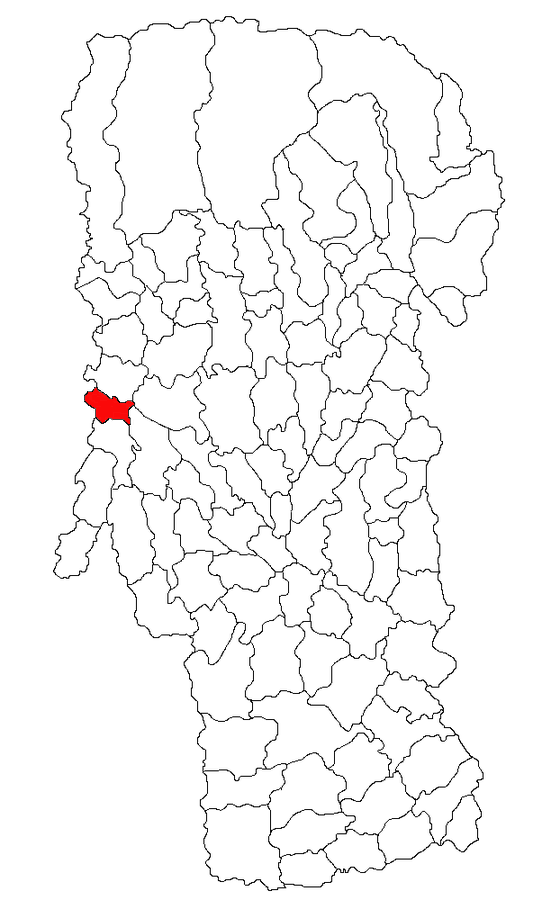
- Location in Argeș County

- Location in Romania
- Coordinates: 45°04′N 24°32′E
- Country: Romania
- County: Argeș

Government
  - Mayor (2024–2028): Cornel-Constantin Panțeru (PNL)
- Area: 21.25 km^{2} (8.20 sq mi)
- Population (2021-12-01): 923
  - Density: 43.4/km^{2} (112/sq mi)
- Time zone: UTC+02:00 (EET)
  - Summer (DST): UTC+03:00 (EEST)
- Postal code: 117575
- Area code: +(40) 248
- Vehicle reg.: AG
- Website: www.cjarges.ro/en/web/poienarii-de-arges

Poienarii de Argeș is a commune in Argeș County, Muntenia, Romania. It is composed of four villages: Ceaurești, Ioanicești, Poienari (the commune center), and Tomulești.

The commune is located in the western part of the county, on the border with Vâlcea County. It lies on the banks of the Topolog River.
