= Poienile =

Poienile may refer to:

- Poienile, a village in the town of Pătârlagele, Buzău County, Romania
- Poienile, a village in Bulzești Commune, Dolj County, Romania
- Poienile, a village in Dagâța Commune, Iaşi County, Romania
- Poienile, a village in Predeal-Sărari Commune, Prahova County, Romania
- Poienile, a village in Gura Caliței Commune, Vrancea County, Romania

== See also ==
- Poienile de sub Munte, a commune in Maramureș County
- Poienile Izei, a commune in Maramureș County
- Poienile-Mogoş, a village in Mogoș Commune, Alba County
- Poienile Zagrei, a village in Zagra Commune, Bistriţa-Năsăud County
- Poienile Boinei, a village in Şopotu Nou Commune, Caraş-Severin County
- Poienile Oancei, a village in Stănița Commune, Neamţ County
