= Lipovăț =

- Commune
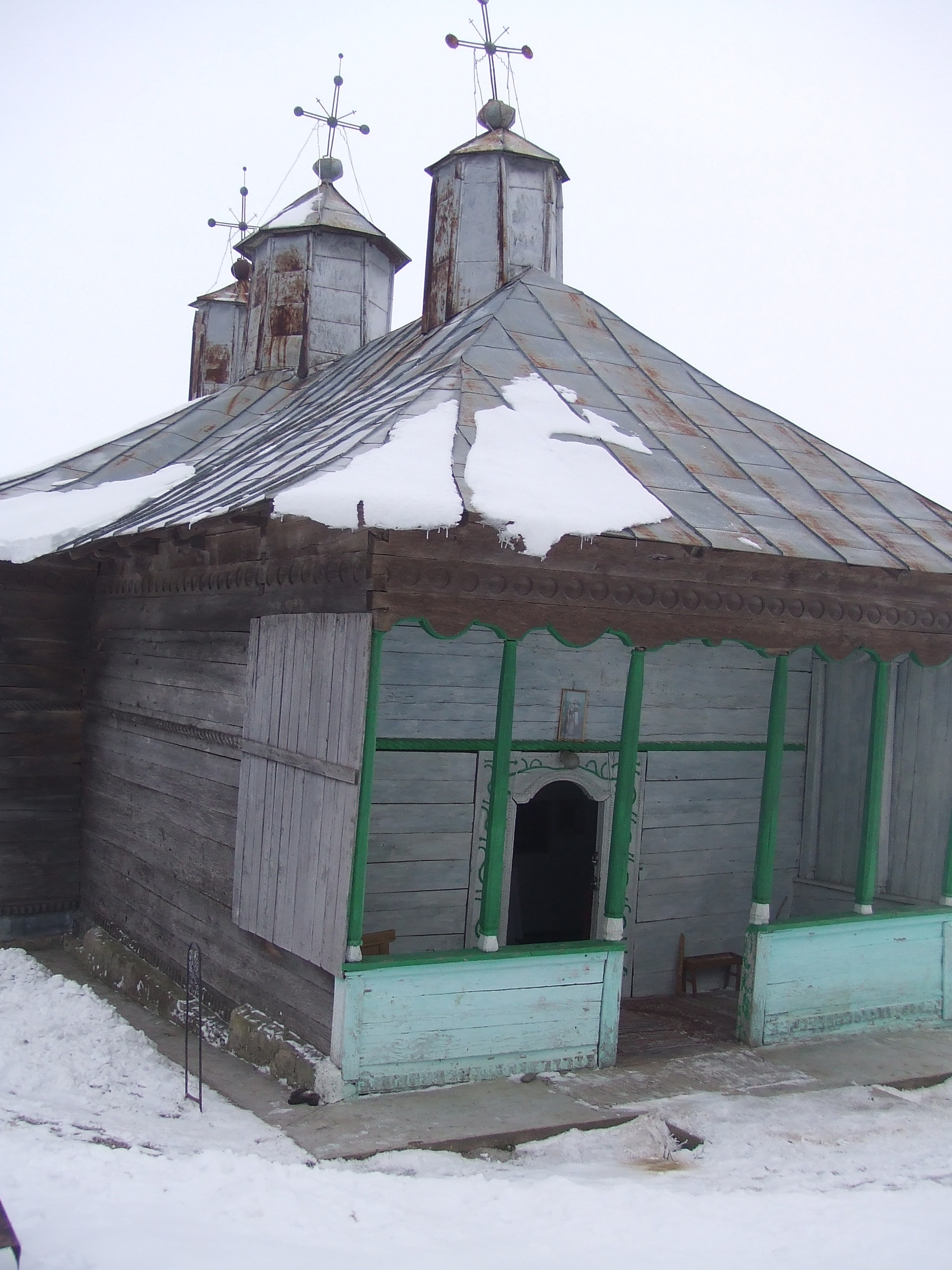
- Wooden church in Căpușneni

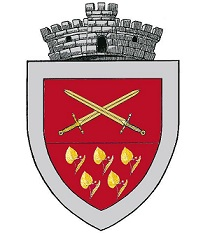
- Coat of arms

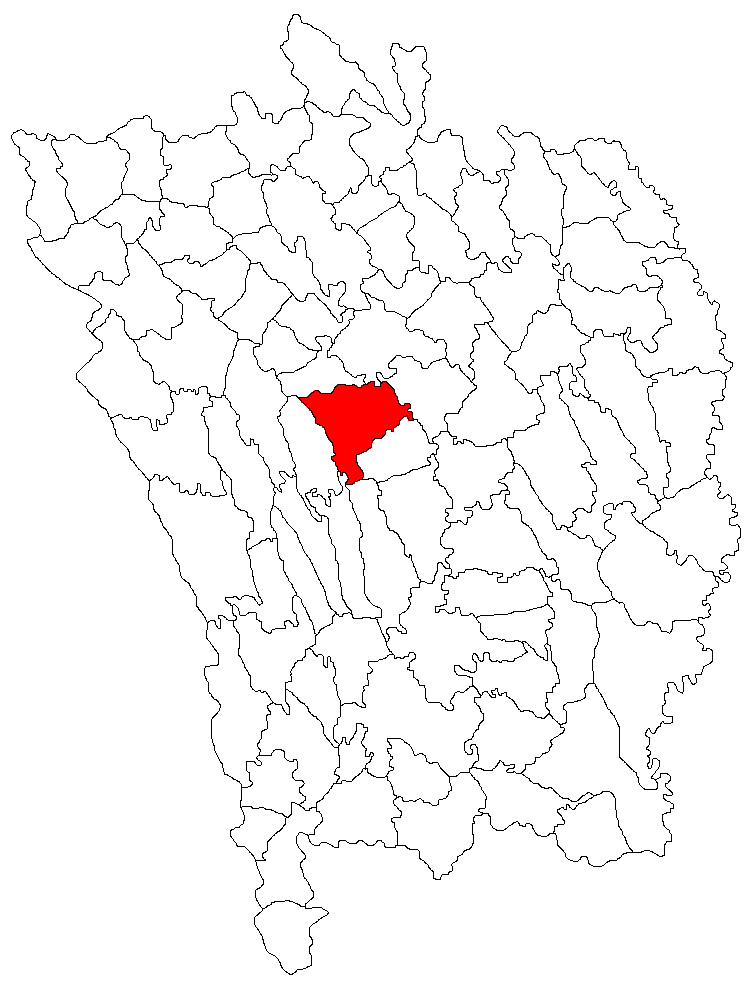
- Location in Vaslui County

- Location in Romania
- Coordinates: 46°34′N 27°42′E
- Country: Romania
- County: Vaslui
- Subdivisions: Căpușneni, Chițoc, Corbu, Fundu Văii, Lipovăț

Government
  - Mayor (2020–2024): Valerian Hriscu (PSD)
- Area: 72 km^{2} (28 sq mi)
- Elevation: 137 m (449 ft)
- Population (2021-12-01): 4,024
  - Density: 56/km^{2} (140/sq mi)
- Time zone: UTC+02:00 (EET)
  - Summer (DST): UTC+03:00 (EEST)
- Postal code: 737335
- Area code: +(40) x35
- Vehicle reg.: VS
- Website: comuna-lipovat.ro

Lipovăț is a commune in Vaslui County, Western Moldavia, Romania. It is composed of five villages: Căpușneni, Chițoc, Corbu, Fundu Văii, and Lipovăț.

== Natives ==
- Ștefan Ciubotărașu (1910 – 1970), actor
- Dumitru Nagîț (1949 – 2003), mayor of Iași
- Virgil Trofin (1926 – 1984), communist activist and politician
