= Poliana, Dniester Raion, Chernivtsi Oblast =

Village in Chernivtsi Oblast, Ukraine

Poliana Поляна Poiana
- Location of Poliana in Ukraine Poliana (Ukraine)
- Coordinates: 48°29′8″N 26°14′12″E
- Country: Ukraine
- Oblast: Chernivtsi Oblast
- Raion: Dniester Raion
- Hromada: Klishkivtsi rural hromada
- Founded: 1659

Area
  - Total: 5.147 km^{2} (1.987 sq mi)
- Elevation: 260 m (850 ft)

Population
  - Total: 1,221
  - Density: 237.2/km^{2} (614.4/sq mi)
- Time zone: UTC+2 (EET)
  - Summer (DST): UTC+3 (EEST)
- Postal code: 60016
- Area code: +380 3731
- KATOTTH: UA73040050090089228
- KOATUU (superseded): 7325086601

Poliana (Ukrainian: Поляна; Romanian: Poiana) is a village in Dniester Raion, Chernivtsi Oblast, Ukraine. It belongs to Klishkivtsi rural hromada, one of the hromadas of Ukraine. Until August 2015, it served as the administrative centre and sole constituent settlement of Poliana silrada.

Until 18 July 2020, Poliana belonged to Khotyn Raion. The raion was abolished in July 2020 as part of the administrative reform of Ukraine, which reduced the number of raions of Chernivtsi Oblast to three. The area of Khotyn Raion was merged into Dniester Raion.
