= Grivița, Vaslui =

Grivița
- Commune
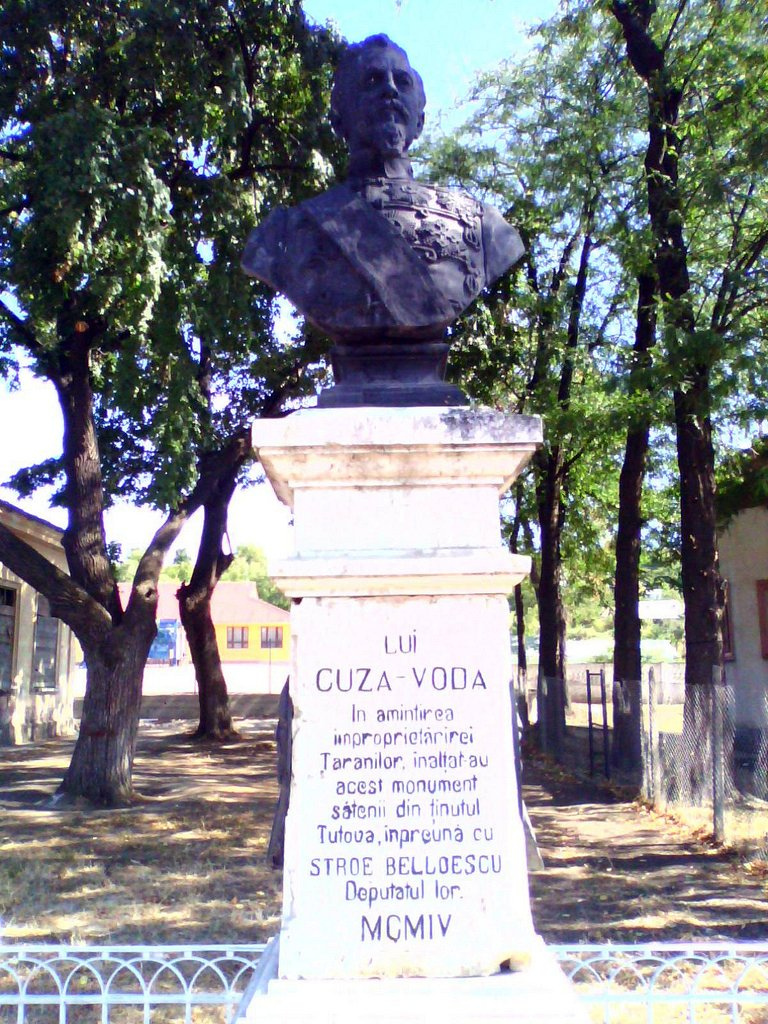
- Bust of Alexandru Ioan Cuza

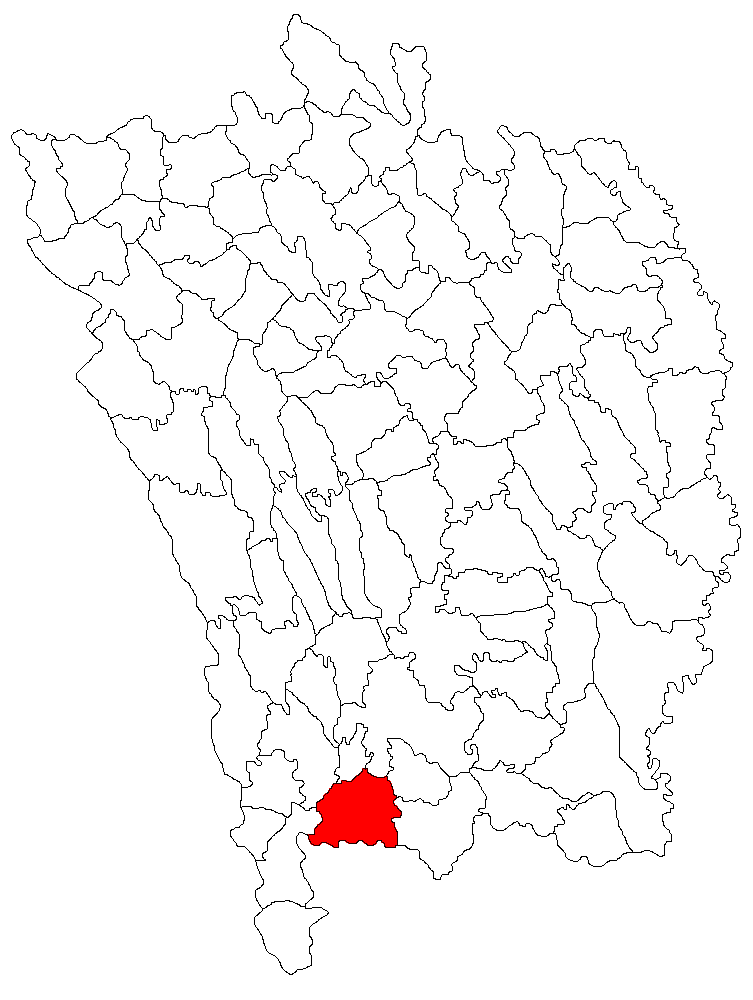
- Location in Vaslui County

- Location in Romania
- Coordinates: 46°10′N 27°40′E
- Country: Romania
- County: Vaslui
- Established: 1504
- Subdivisions: Grivița, Odaia Bursucani, Trestiana

Government
  - Mayor (2020–2024): Alina-Iuliana Munteanu (PNL)
- Area: 63 km^{2} (24 sq mi)
- Elevation: 97 m (318 ft)
- Population (2021-12-01): 3,288
  - Density: 52/km^{2} (140/sq mi)
- Time zone: UTC+02:00 (EET)
  - Summer (DST): UTC+03:00 (EEST)
- Postal code: 737280
- Area code: (+40) 0235
- Vehicle reg.: VS
- Website: grivitavs.ro

Grivița is a commune in Vaslui County, Western Moldavia, Romania. It is composed of three villages: Grivița, Odaia Bursucani, and Trestiana.

Historical population
| Year | Pop. | ±% |
|---|---|---|
| 2002 | 3,555 | — |
| 2011 | 3,293 | −7.4% |
| 2021 | 3,288 | −0.2% |
Source: Census data
