= Bohdana =

Bohdana may refer to:

== People ==
- Bohdana Durda (born 1940), Ukrainian artist, writer, poet, and songwriter
- Bohdana Frolyak (born 1968), Ukrainian composer
- Bohdana Konashuk (born 1998), Ukrainian Paralympic Nordic skier
- Bohdana Matsotska (born 1989), Ukrainian alpine skier

== Other ==
- 2S22 Bohdana, 155 mm NATO-standard artillery caliber, wheeled self-propelled howitzer developed in Ukraine
- Stadion imeni Bohdana Markevycha, sports stadium in Vynnyky, Ukraine
