= Barcea =

- Commune
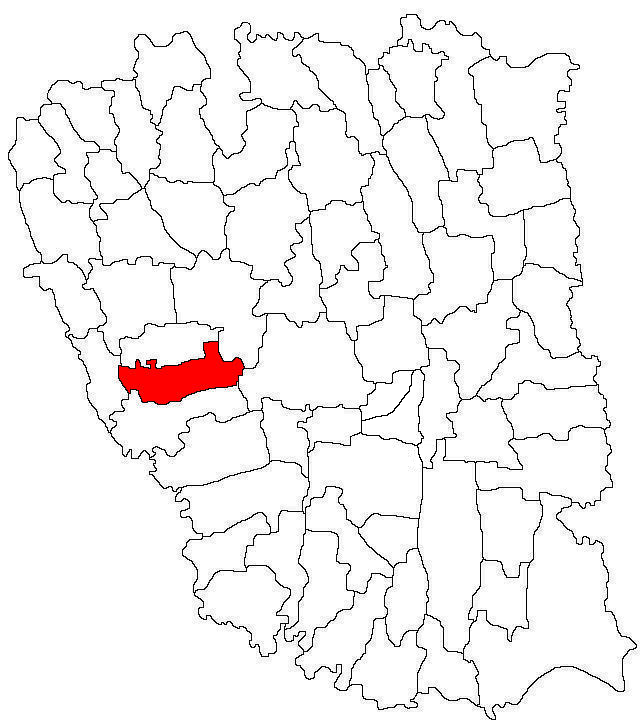
- Location in Galați County

- Location in Romania
- Coordinates: 45°45′N 27°28′E
- Country: Romania
- County: Galați

Government
  - Mayor (2024–2028): Constantin Zamfir (PNL)
- Area: 61.39 km^{2} (23.70 sq mi)
- Elevation: 29 m (95 ft)
- Population (2021-12-01): 5,074
  - Density: 82.65/km^{2} (214.1/sq mi)
- Time zone: UTC+02:00 (EET)
  - Summer (DST): UTC+03:00 (EEST)
- Postal code: 807005
- Area code: (+40) 0236
- Vehicle reg.: GL
- Website: primaria-barcea.ro

Barcea is a commune in Galați County, Western Moldavia, Romania. It is composed of two villages, Barcea and Podoleni.

Historical population
| Year | Pop. | ±% |
|---|---|---|
| 2002 | 6,036 | — |
| 2011 | 4,957 | −17.9% |
| 2021 | 5,074 | +2.4% |
Source: Census data

At the 2021 census, the commune had a population of 5,074; of those, 72.55% were Romanians and 13.28% Roma.

== Natives ==
- Dorin Manole (born 5 August 1986), rugby union player
