= Bozieni, Hîncești =

Bozieni
- Commune
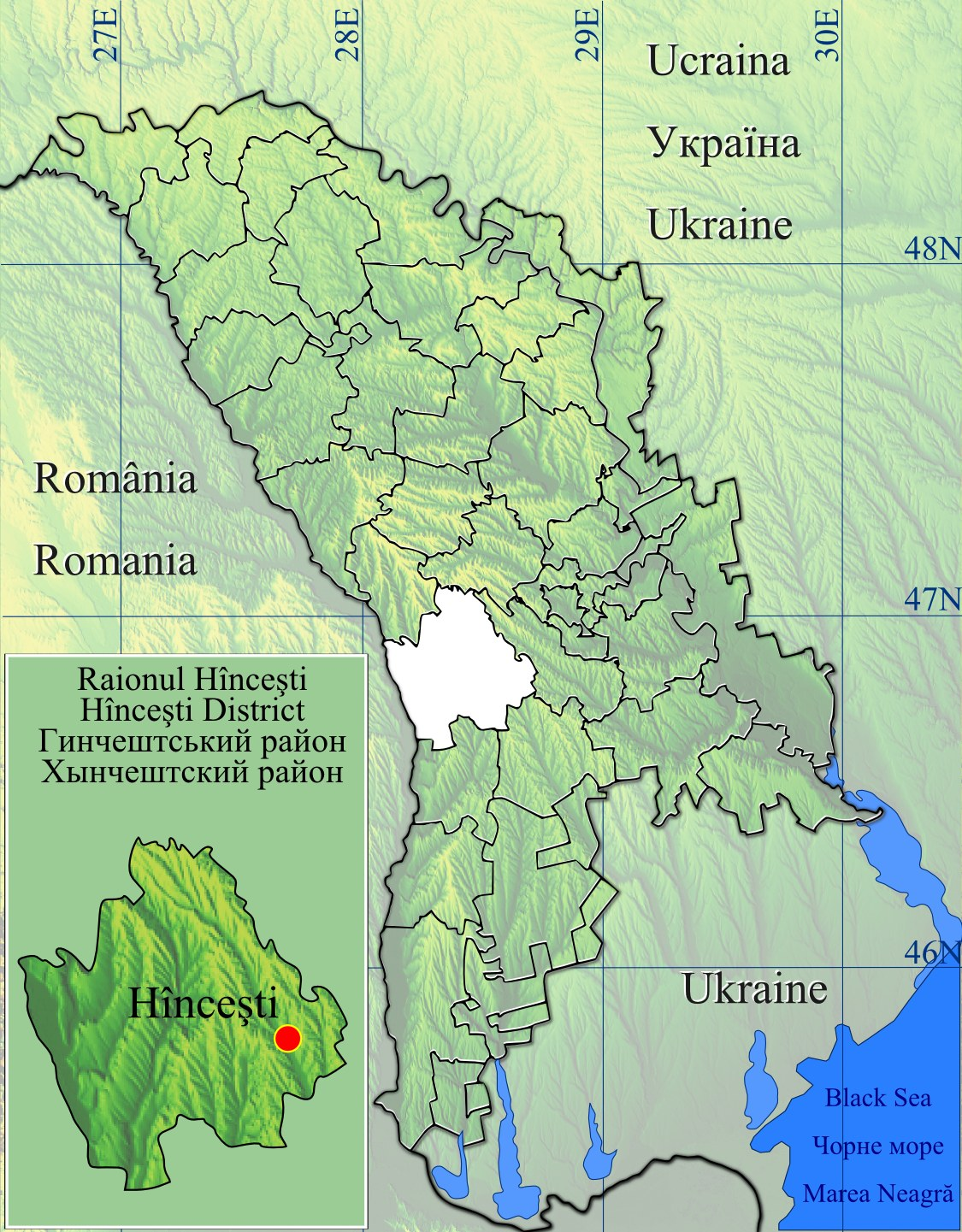
- Location within Hîncești
- Coordinates: 46°45′30″N 28°38′17″E
- Country: Moldova

Population (2014)
  - Total: 2,406
- Time zone: UTC+2 (EET)
  - Summer (DST): UTC+3 (EEST)
- Postal code: MD-3415

Bozieni is a commune in Hînceşti District, Moldova. It is composed of two villages, Bozieni and Dubovca.
