= Drăgușeni, Iași =

Drăgușeni
- Commune
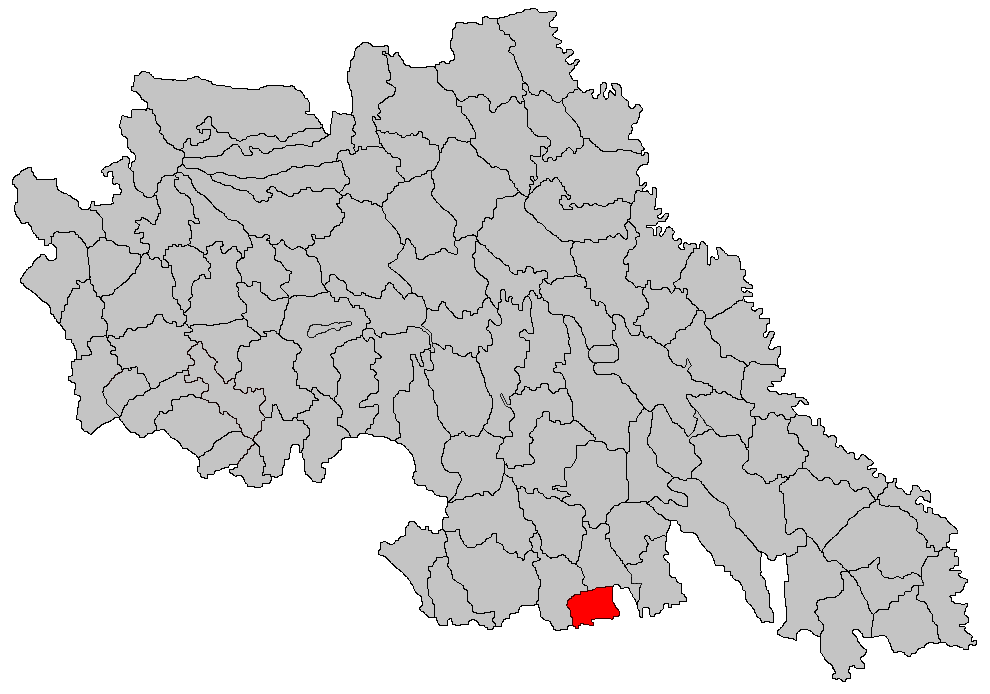
- Location in Iași County

- Location in Romania
- Coordinates: 46°55′N 27°30′E
- Country: Romania
- County: Iași
- Subdivisions: Drăgușeni, Frenciugi

Government
  - Mayor (2024–2028): Petronela Pelin (PNL)
- Area: 23.25 km^{2} (8.98 sq mi)
- Elevation: 157 m (515 ft)
- Population (2021-12-01): 1,217
  - Density: 52/km^{2} (140/sq mi)
- Time zone: EET/EEST (UTC+2/+3)
- Postal code: 707478
- Area code: +40 x32
- Vehicle reg.: IS
- Website: www.comunadraguseni.ro

Drăgușeni is a commune in Iași County, Western Moldavia, Romania, located on the Stavnic River at 30 km from Iași. It is composed of two villages, Drăgușeni and Frenciugi. The villages were part of Șcheia Commune until 2004, when they were split off.
