= Cozmești, Vaslui =

Cozmești
- Commune
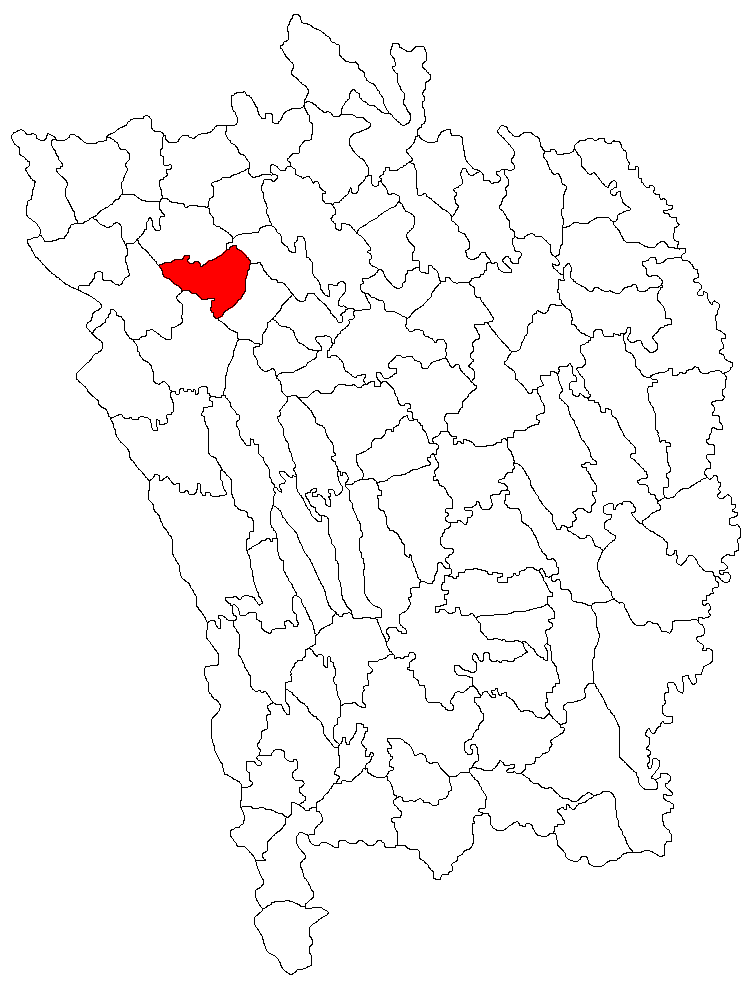
- Location in Vaslui County

- Location in Romania
- Coordinates: 46°44′N 27°29′E
- Country: Romania
- County: Vaslui

Government
  - Mayor (2020–2024): Hristache Sima (PSD)
- Population (2021-12-01): 1,840
- Time zone: EET/EEST (UTC+2/+3)
- Vehicle reg.: VS

Cozmești is a commune in Vaslui County, Western Moldavia, Romania. It is composed of four villages: Bălești, Cozmești, Fâstâci and Hordilești. These were part of Delești Commune until 2004, when they were split off.

== See also ==
- Fâstâci Monastery
