= Grajduri =

- Commune
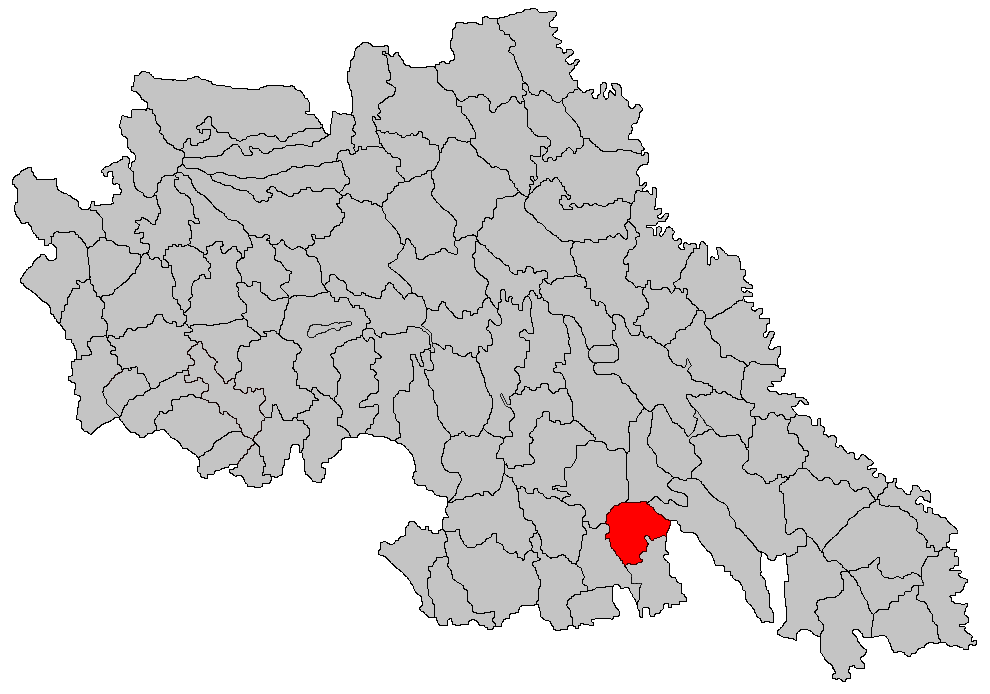
- Location in Iași County

- Location in Romania
- Coordinates: 46°58′N 27°31′E
- Country: Romania
- County: Iași
- Subdivisions: Grajduri, Cărbunari, Corcodel, Lunca, Pădureni, Poiana cu Cetate, Valea Satului

Government
  - Mayor (2024–2028): Constantin Zamfirache (PSD)
- Area: 48 km^{2} (19 sq mi)
- Elevation: 334 m (1,096 ft)
- Population (2021-12-01): 3,687
  - Density: 77/km^{2} (200/sq mi)
- Time zone: EET/EEST (UTC+2/+3)
- Postal code: 707215
- Area code: +40 x32
- Vehicle reg.: IS
- Website: primariagrajduri.ro

Grajduri is a commune in Iași County, Western Moldavia, Romania. It is composed of seven villages: Cărbunari, Corcodel, Grajduri, Lunca, Pădureni, Poiana cu Cetate and Valea Satului.
