= Vulturești, Vaslui =

Vulturești
- Commune
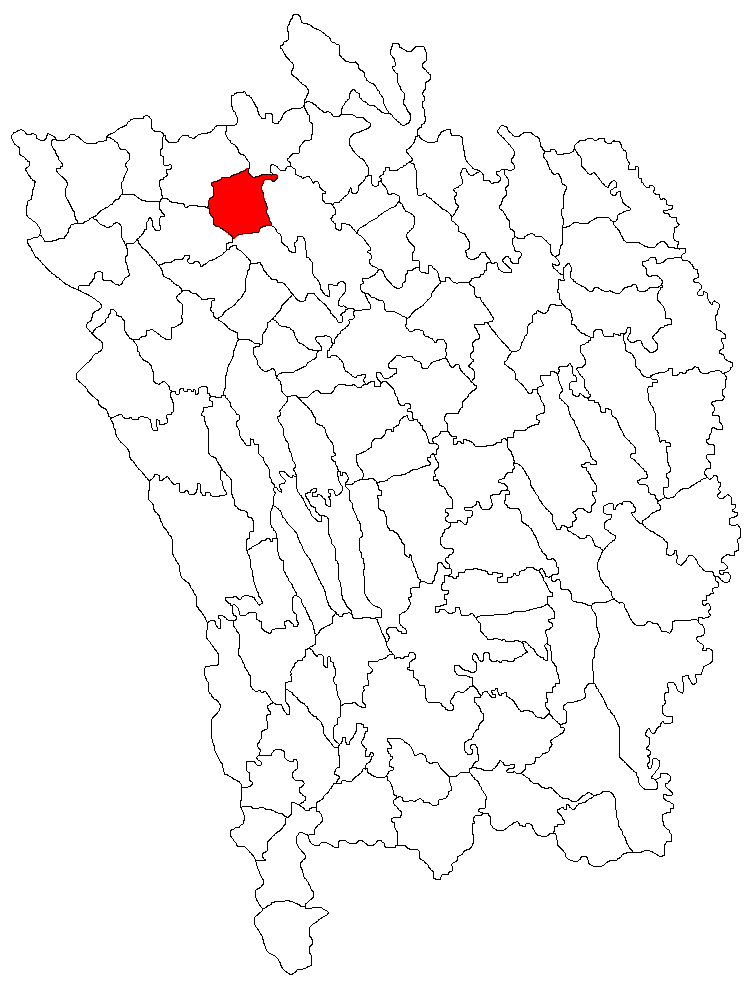
- Location in Vaslui County

- Location in Romania
- Coordinates: 46°49′N 27°32′E
- Country: Romania
- County: Vaslui

Government
  - Mayor (2020–2024): Adrian Brîncă (PSD)
- Area: 39.31 km^{2} (15.18 sq mi)
- Elevation: 130 m (430 ft)
- Population (2021-12-01): 2,031
  - Density: 51.67/km^{2} (133.8/sq mi)
- Time zone: UTC+02:00 (EET)
  - Summer (DST): UTC+03:00 (EEST)
- Postal code: 737615
- Area code: +(40) x35
- Vehicle reg.: VS
- Website: www.vulturesti-vaslui.ro

Vulturești is a commune in Vaslui County, Western Moldavia, Romania. It is composed of four villages: Buhăiești, Podeni, Voinești, and Vulturești.

== Demographics ==
At the 2021 Romanian census, Vulturești had a population of 2,031, down from 2,236 at the 2011 Romanian census. The majority of residents were ethnic Romanians (94.4%) and adhered to the Romanian Orthodox Church (93.7%).
