= Ruginoasa, Neamț =

Ruginoasa
- Commune
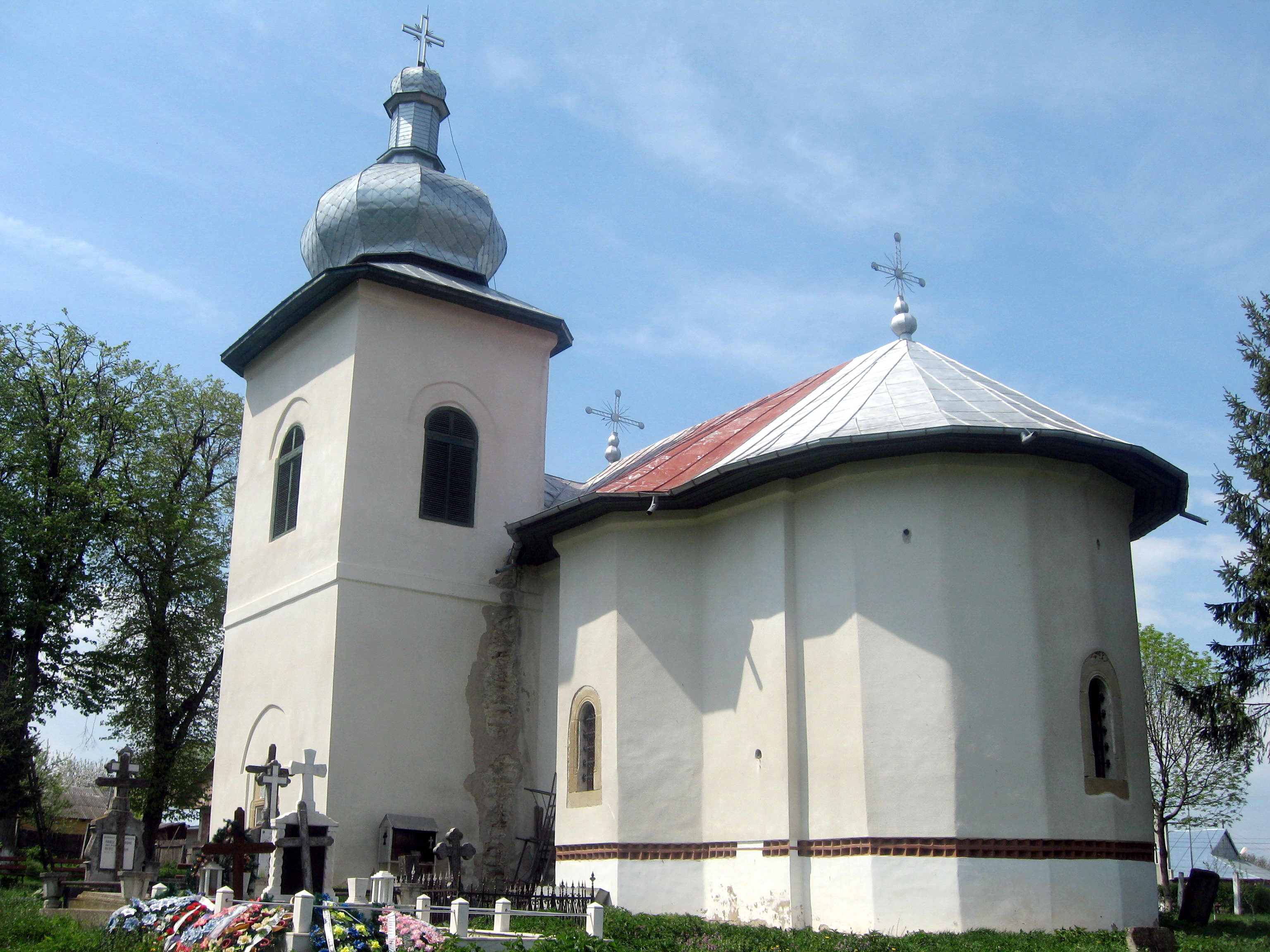
- Church of the Ascension of Christ in Bozienii de Sus

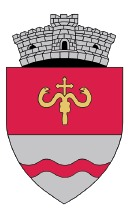
- Coat of arms

- Location in Neamț County

- Location in Romania
- Coordinates: 46.9850°N 26.7011°E
- Country: Romania
- County: Neamț

Government
  - Mayor (2024–2028): Miluc Grigoraș (PNL)
- Area: 30.23 km^{2} (11.67 sq mi)
- Elevation: 324 m (1,063 ft)
- Population (2021-12-01): 1,496
  - Density: 49.49/km^{2} (128.2/sq mi)
- Time zone: UTC+02:00 (EET)
  - Summer (DST): UTC+03:00 (EEST)
- Postal code: 617183
- Area code: +(40) 233
- Vehicle reg.: NT
- Website: www.primariaruginoasa.ro

Ruginoasa is a commune in Neamț County, Western Moldavia, Romania. It is composed of two villages, Bozienii de Sus and Ruginoasa.

Historical population
Year	Pop.	±%
1992	2,180	—
2002	2,099	−3.7%
2011	1,782	−15.1%
2021	1,496	−16.0%
Source: Census data
