= Bozieni, Neamț =

Bozieni
- Commune
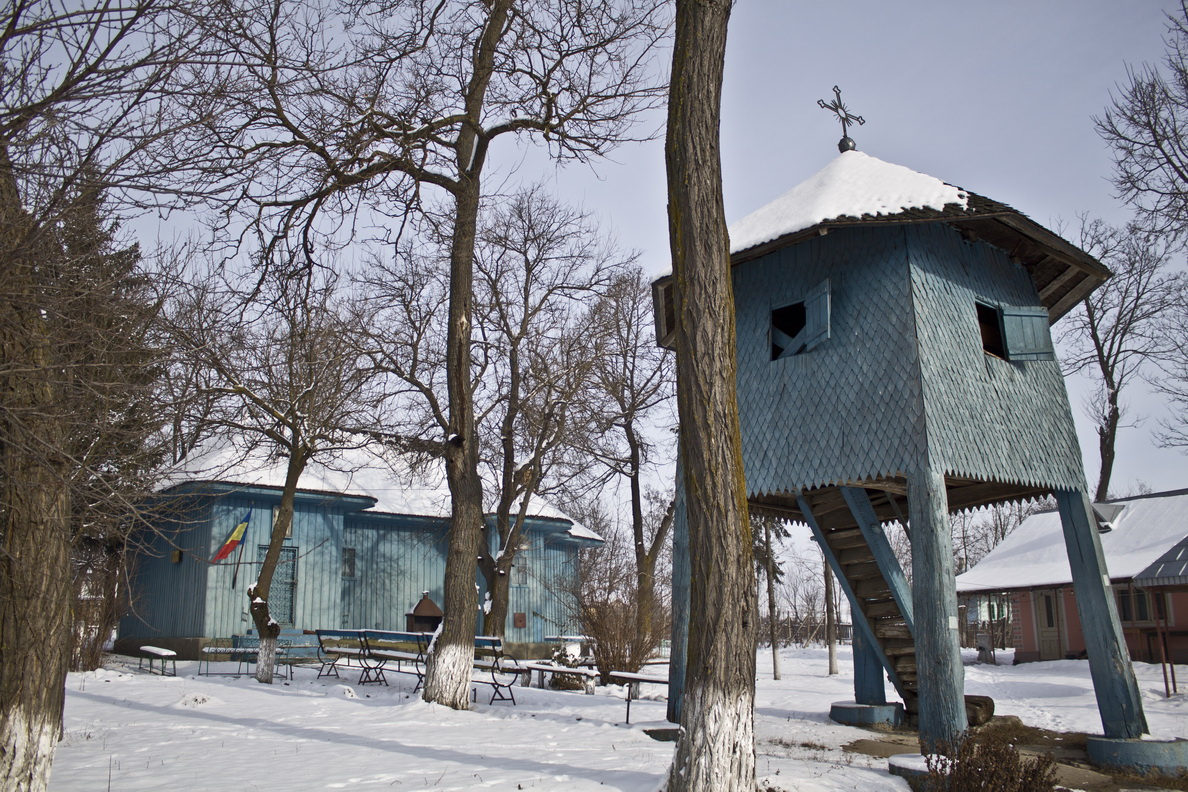
- Wooden church in Crăiești

- Location in Neamț County

- Location in Romania
- Coordinates: 46.839°N 27.149°E
- Country: Romania
- County: Neamț

Government
  - Mayor (2024–2028): Octavian Dănuț Arghiropol (PNL)
- Area: 46.73 km^{2} (18.04 sq mi)
- Elevation: 219 m (719 ft)
- Population (2021-12-01): 2,489
  - Density: 53.26/km^{2} (138.0/sq mi)
- Time zone: UTC+02:00 (EET)
  - Summer (DST): UTC+03:00 (EEST)
- Postal code: 617100
- Area code: +(40) 233
- Vehicle reg.: NT
- Website: comunabozieni.ro

Bozieni is a commune in Neamț County, Western Moldavia, Romania. It is composed of five villages: Băneasa, Bozieni, Crăiești, Cuci, and Iucșa.

Historical population
| Year | Pop. | ±% |
|---|---|---|
| 1992 | 3,288 | — |
| 2002 | 3,058 | −7.0% |
| 2011 | 2,716 | −11.2% |
| 2021 | 2,489 | −8.4% |
Source: Census data

== Natives ==
- Dumitru Grumezescu (born 1949), rower
