= Oltenești =

- Commune
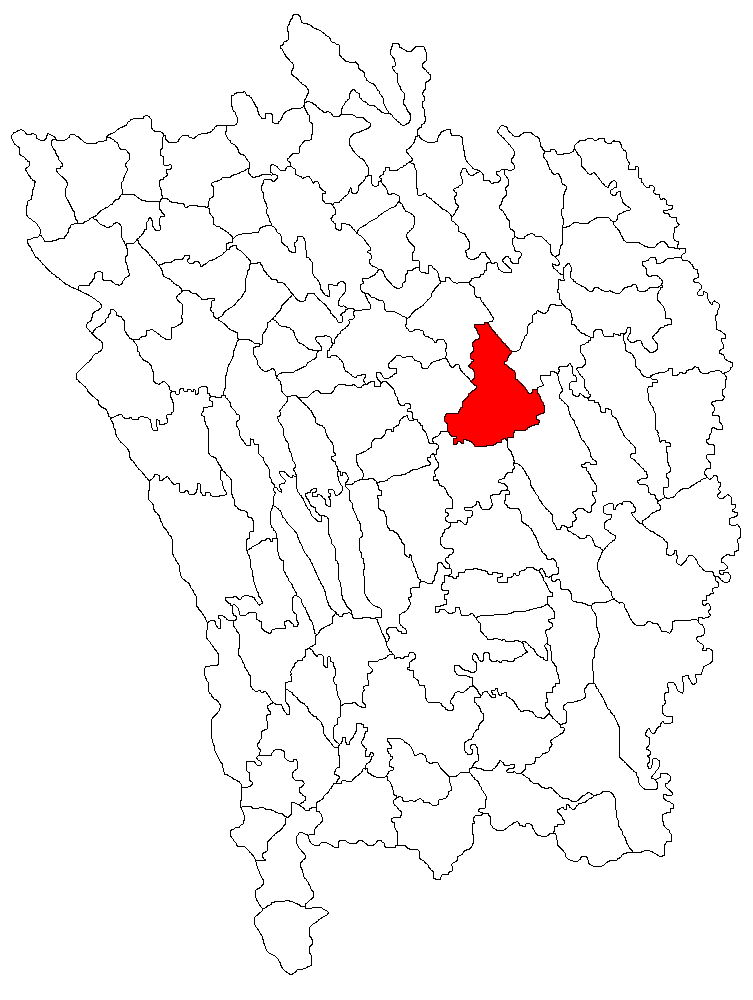
- Location in Vaslui County

- Location in Romania
- Coordinates: 46°35′N 27°54′E
- Country: Romania
- County: Vaslui
- Population (2021-12-01): 2,108
- Time zone: EET/EEST (UTC+2/+3)
- Vehicle reg.: VS

Oltenești is a commune in Vaslui County, Western Moldavia, Romania. It is composed of six villages: Curteni, Oltenești, Pâhna, Târzii, Vinețești and Zgura.
