= Scânteia, Iași =

Scânteia
- Commune
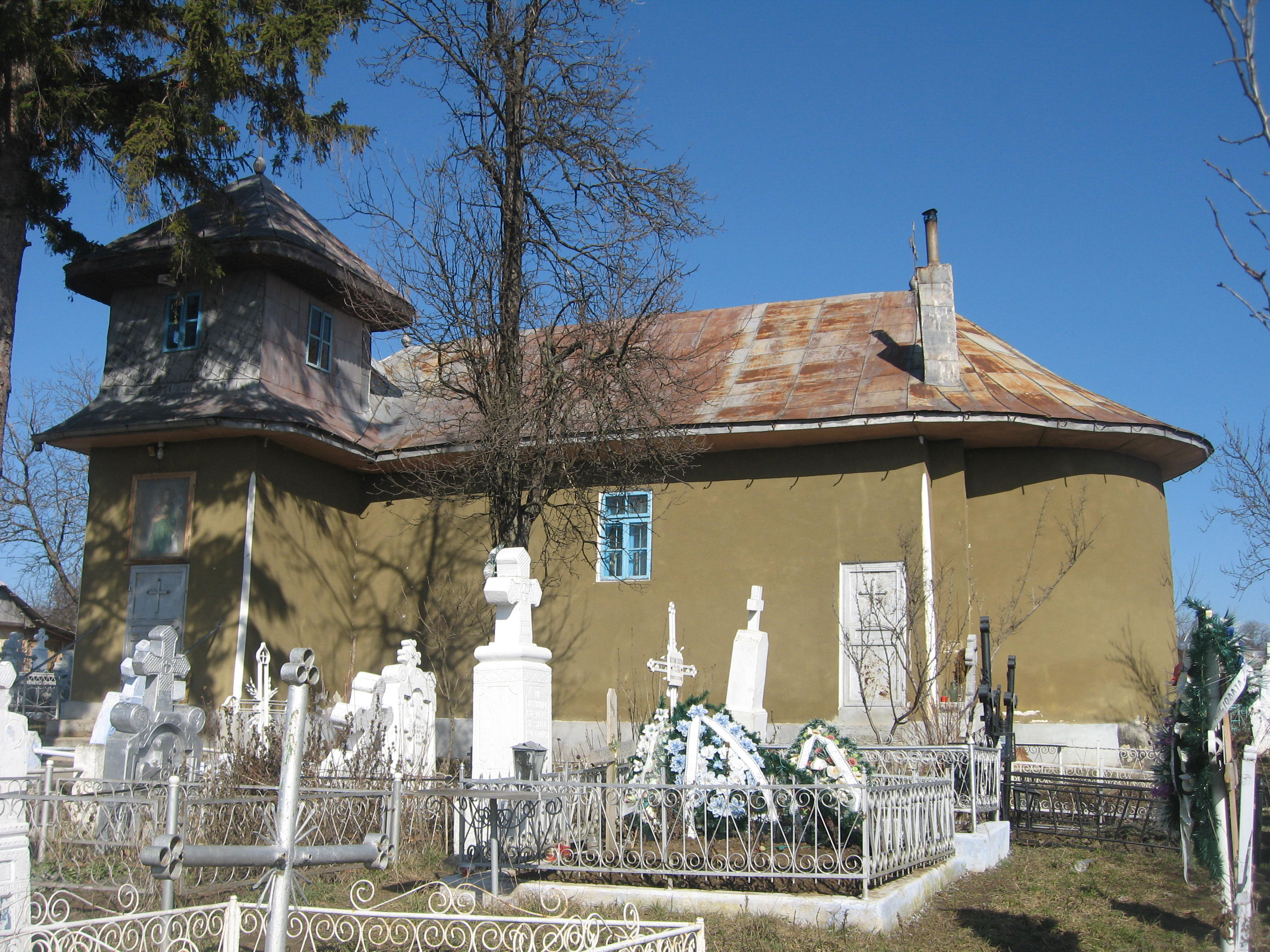
- Wooden church in Boroșești

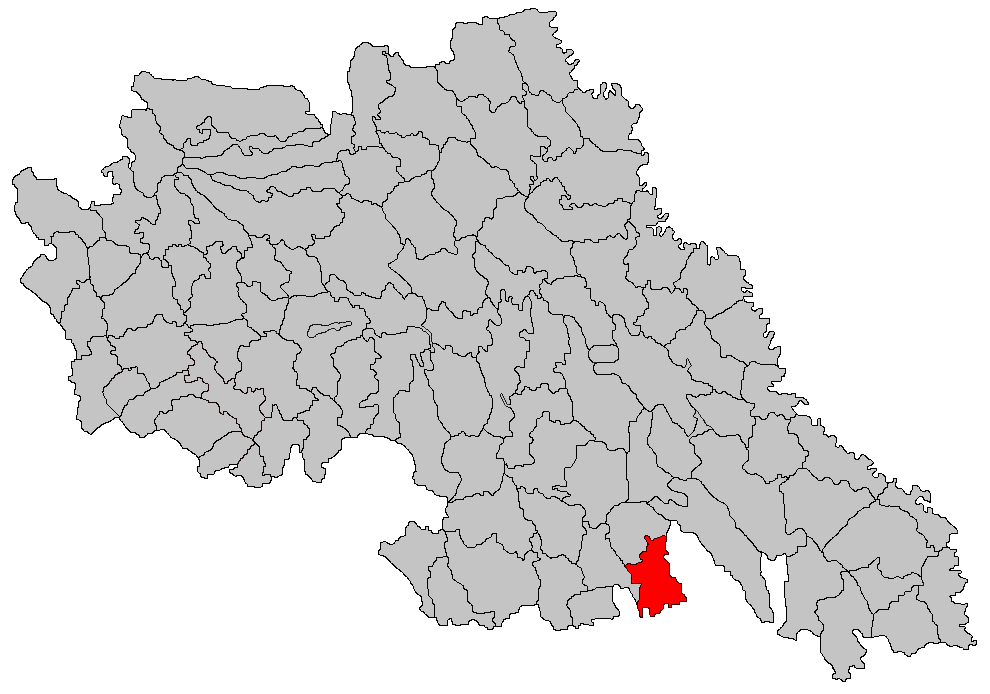
- Location in Iași County

- Location in Romania
- Coordinates: 46°55′N 27°34′E
- Country: Romania
- County: Iași

Government
  - Mayor (2020–2024): Mihai Darabană (PNL)
- Area: 41.43 km^{2} (16.00 sq mi)
- Elevation: 167 m (548 ft)
- Population (2021-12-01): 5,505
  - Density: 132.9/km^{2} (344.1/sq mi)
- Time zone: UTC+02:00 (EET)
  - Summer (DST): UTC+03:00 (EEST)
- Postal code: 707425
- Area code: +(40) 232
- Vehicle reg.: IS
- Website: comunascanteia.ro

Scânteia is a commune in Iași County, Western Moldavia, Romania. It is composed of seven villages: Bodești, Boroșești, Ciocârlești, Lunca Rateș, Rediu, Scânteia, and Tufeștii de Sus.

== Natives ==
- Florin Lambagiu (born 1996), kickboxer
- Neculai Alexandru Ursu (1926–2016), linguist, philologist, and literary historian

== Road accident ==
In 2009, Romania's deadliest road accident for fifteen years, a bus and train collision, killed at least 13 people in Scânteia.
