= Șcheia, Iași =

Șcheia
- Commune
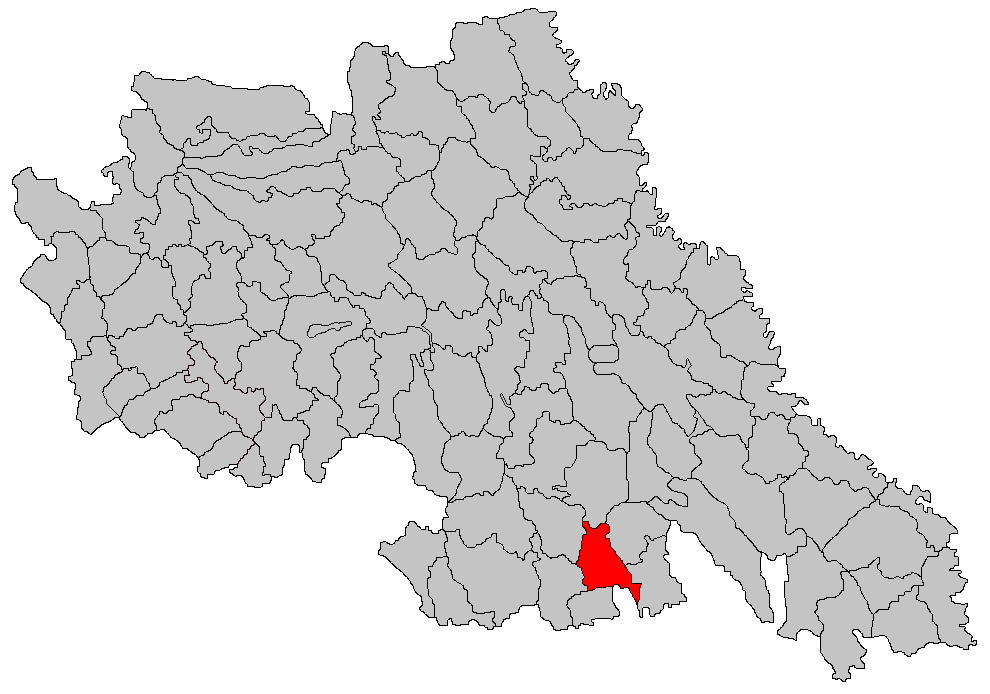
- Location in Iași County

- Location in Romania
- Coordinates: 46°56′N 27°31′E
- Country: Romania
- County: Iași
- Subdivisions: Șcheia, Căuești, Cioca-Boca, Poiana Șcheii, Satu Nou

Government
  - Mayor (2024–2028): Dănuț Ababei (PSD)
- Area: 39.97 km^{2} (15.43 sq mi)
- Elevation: 258 m (846 ft)
- Population (2021-12-01): 2,583
  - Density: 65/km^{2} (170/sq mi)
- Time zone: EET/EEST (UTC+2/+3)
- Postal code: 707475
- Area code: +40 x32
- Vehicle reg.: IS
- Website: www.scheia.ro

Șcheia is a commune in Iași County, Western Moldavia, Romania. It is composed of five villages: Căuești, Cioca-Boca, Poiana Șcheii, Satu Nou and Șcheia. It also included Drăgușeni and Frenciugi villages until 2004, when they were split off to form Drăgușeni Commune.

Șcheia is one of the few places in Iași County with a notable history in masonry and stone-cutting (one of Romania's oldest public monuments, the Lions' Obelisk in Iași, is made of Șcheia stone).
