= Țibana =

- Commune
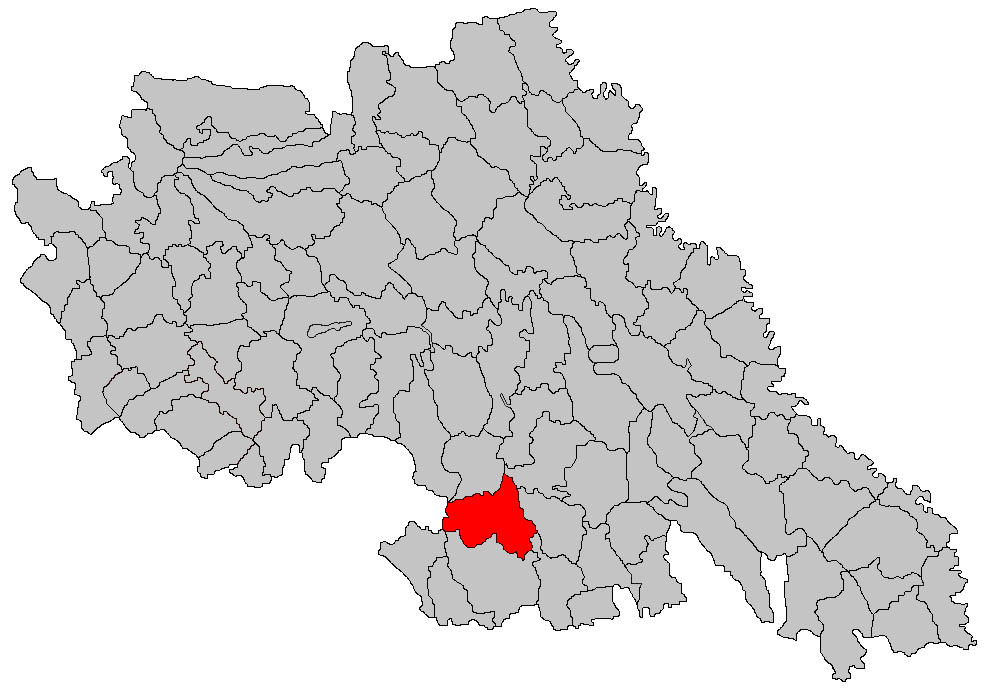
- Location in Iași County

- Location in Romania
- Coordinates: 46°59′N 27°20′E
- Country: Romania
- County: Iași
- Subdivisions: Țibana, Alexeni, Domnița, Gârbești, Moara Ciornei, Oproaia, Poiana Mănăstirii, Poiana de Sus, Runcu, Vadu Vejei

Government
  - Mayor (2024–2028): Gheorghe Rotaru (PSD)
- Area: 71.65 km^{2} (27.66 sq mi)
- Elevation: 187 m (614 ft)
- Population (2021-12-01): 6,459
  - Density: 90/km^{2} (230/sq mi)
- Time zone: EET/EEST (UTC+2/+3)
- Postal code: 707530
- Area code: +40 x32
- Vehicle reg.: IS
- Website: www.primariatibana.ro

Țibana is a commune in Iași County, Western Moldavia, Romania. It is composed of ten villages: Alexeni, Domnița, Gârbești, Moara Ciornei, Oproaia, Poiana Mănăstirii, Poiana de Sus, Runcu, Țibana, and Vadu Vejei.

The commune is located in the southwestern part of Iași County, 36 km (22 mi) from the county seat, Iași, on the border with Neamț County.
