= Băcani =

- Commune
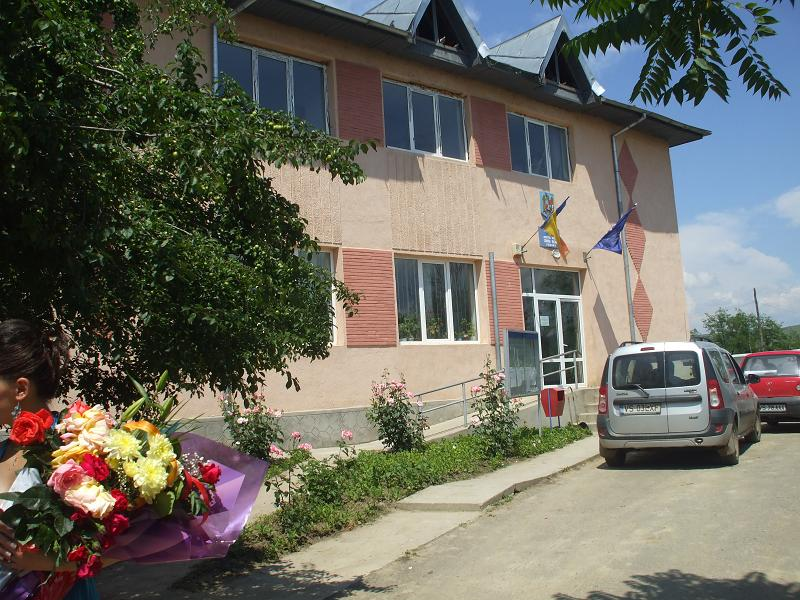
- Băcani town hall

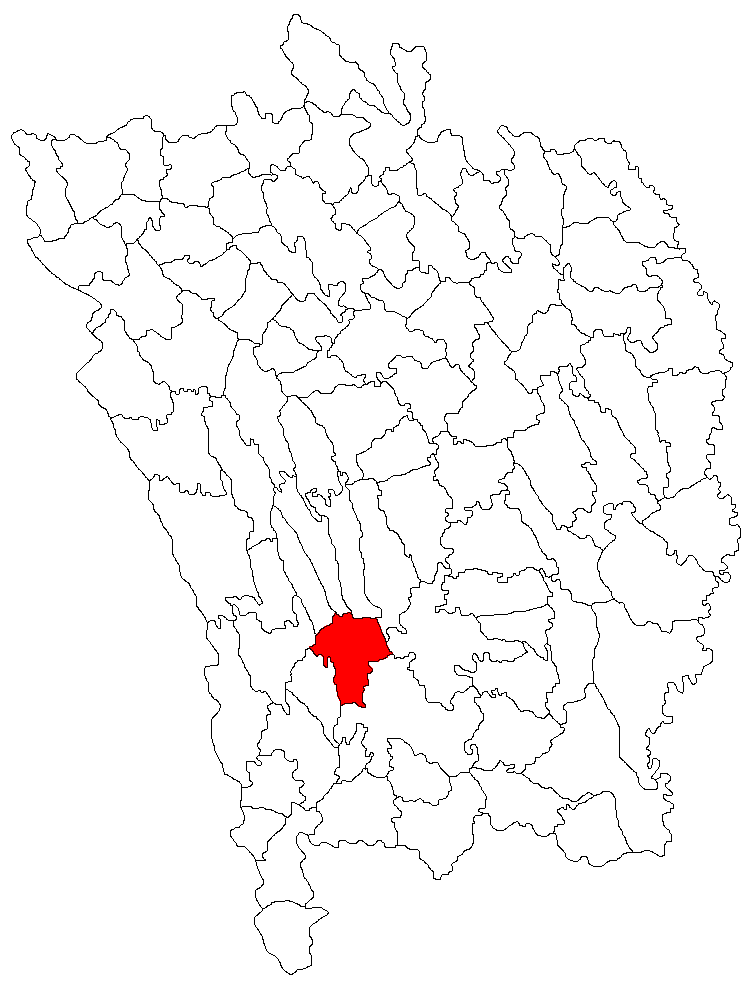
- Location in Vaslui County

- Location in Romania
- Coordinates: 46°20′N 27°40′E
- Country: Romania
- County: Vaslui
- Subdivisions: Băcani, Băltățeni, Drujești, Suseni, Vulpășeni

Government
  - Mayor (2020–2024): Vasile Stoica (PNL)
- Area: 52.2 km^{2} (20.2 sq mi)
- Elevation: 100 m (330 ft)
- Population (2021-12-01): 2,716
  - Density: 52.0/km^{2} (135/sq mi)
- Time zone: UTC+02:00 (EET)
  - Summer (DST): UTC+03:00 (EEST)
- Postal code: 737045
- Area code: +(40) 235
- Vehicle reg.: VS
- Website: www.comunabacani.ro

Băcani is a commune in Vaslui County, Western Moldavia, Romania. It is composed of five villages: Băcani, Băltățeni, Drujești, Suseni, and Vulpășeni.
