= Rebricea =

- Commune
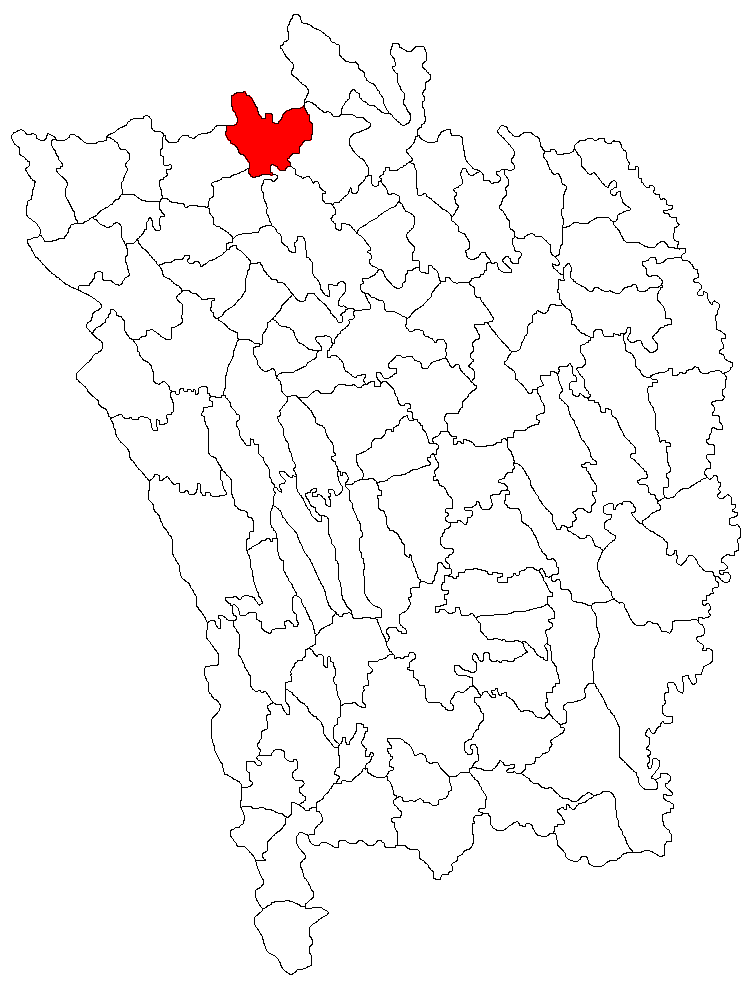
- Location in Vaslui County

- Location in Romania
- Coordinates: 46°52′N 27°33′E
- Country: Romania
- County: Vaslui
- Subdivisions: Bolați, Crăciunești, Draxeni, Măcrești, Rateșu Cuzei, Rebricea, Sasova, Tatomirești, Tufeștii de Jos

Government
  - Mayor (2020–2024): Valerică Radu (PSD)
- Population (2021-12-01): 3,100
- Time zone: EET/EEST (UTC+2/+3)
- Vehicle reg.: VS

Rebricea is a commune in Vaslui County, Western Moldavia, Romania. It is composed of nine villages: Bolați, Crăciunești, Draxeni, Măcrești, Rateșu Cuzei, Rebricea, Sasova, Tatomirești and Tufeștii de Jos.
