= Bârlad (river) =

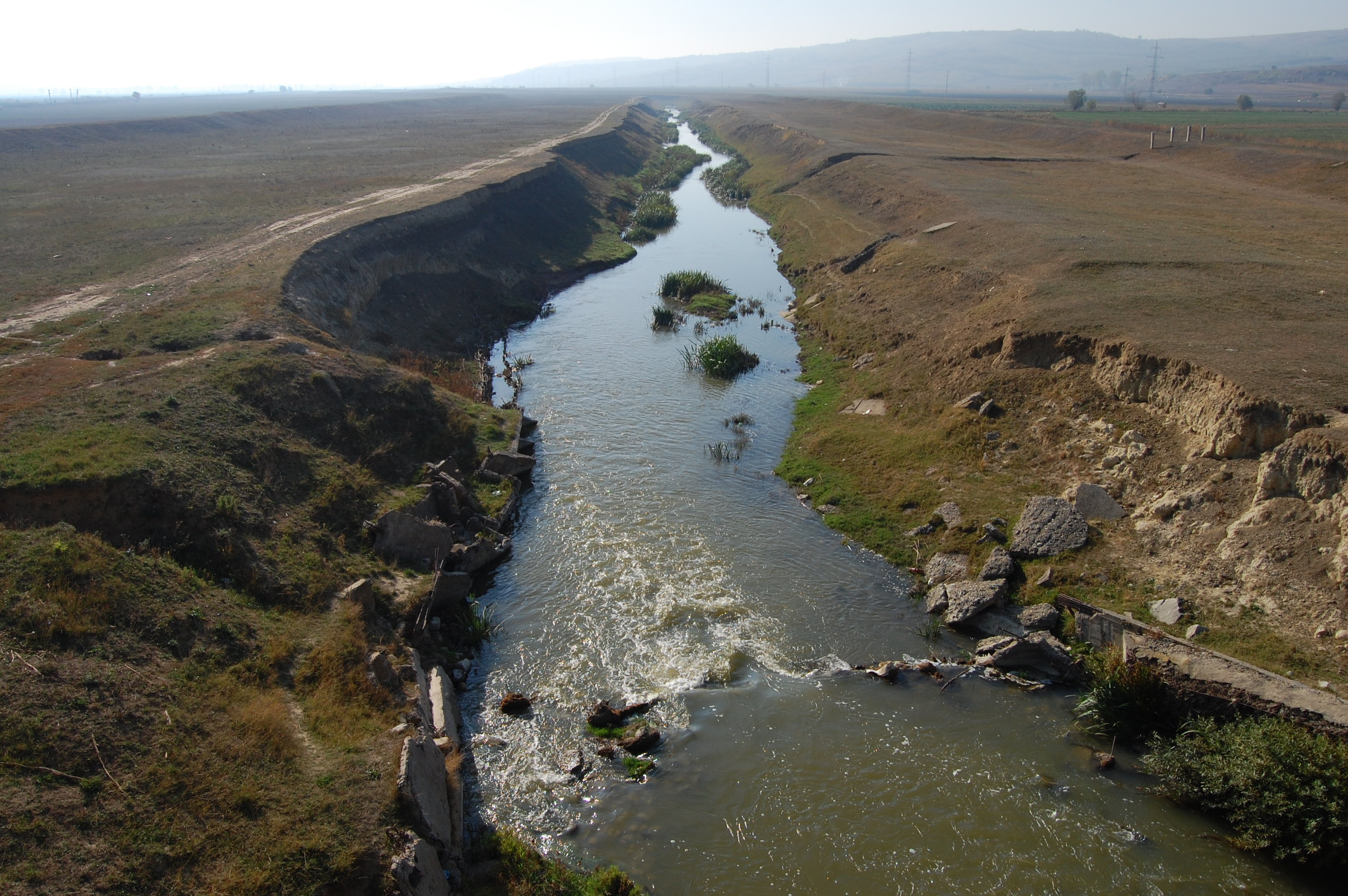
- Bârlad near Muntenii de Jos, Vaslui County

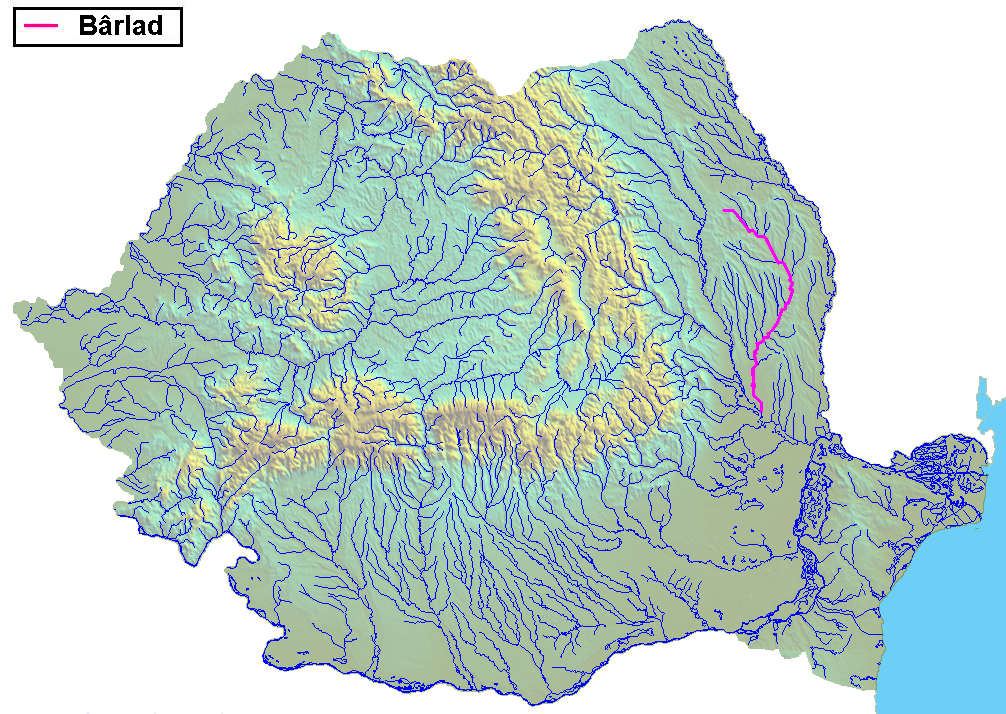

Location
- Country: Romania
- Counties: Neamț, Vaslui, Galați
- Towns: Vaslui, Bârlad, Tecuci

Physical characteristics
- Source: Central Moldavian Plateau
  - location: Valea Ursului
- Mouth: Siret
  - location: Suraia
  - coordinates: 45°40′16″N 27°27′04″E
- Length: 207 km (129 mi)
- Basin size: 7,220 km^{2} (2,790 sq mi)
- Discharge
  - location: Mouth
  - average: 9.0 m^{3}/s (320 cu ft/s)

Basin features
- Progression: Siret→ Danube→ Black Sea

The Bârlad is a river in eastern Romania, a left tributary of the river Siret. Its total length is 207 km (129 mi), and its drainage basin area is 7,220 km^{2} (2,790 sq mi). The source of the Bârlad is in the low hills between the Siret and Prut rivers, southwest of Iași. It flows generally south, through the cities of Negrești, Vaslui, Bârlad and Tecuci. The Bârlad traverses the Romanian counties of Neamț, Vaslui and Galați and flows into the Siret near Suraia.

== Tributaries ==
The following rivers are tributaries to the Bârlad (from source to mouth):

Left: Bozieni, Gârboveta, Hăușei, Găureni, Sacovăț, Velna, Stavnic, Rebricea, Uncești, Telejna, Vaslui, Crasna, Albești, Idrici, Văleni, Petrișoara, Banca, Bujoreni, Zorleni, Trestiana, Jaravăț, Hobana, Bârzotel, Bârzota, Bălăneasa, Gârbovăț, Corozel

Right: Purcica, Poiana Lungă, Bârzești, Stemnic, Racova, Chițoc, Ghilăhoi, Chițcani, Pârvești, Horoiata, Simila, Valea Seacă, Tutova, Pereschiv, Lupul, Berheci, Blăneasa, Prisaca, Tecucel
