= Fălciu County =

Fălciu
- Former County (Judeṭ)
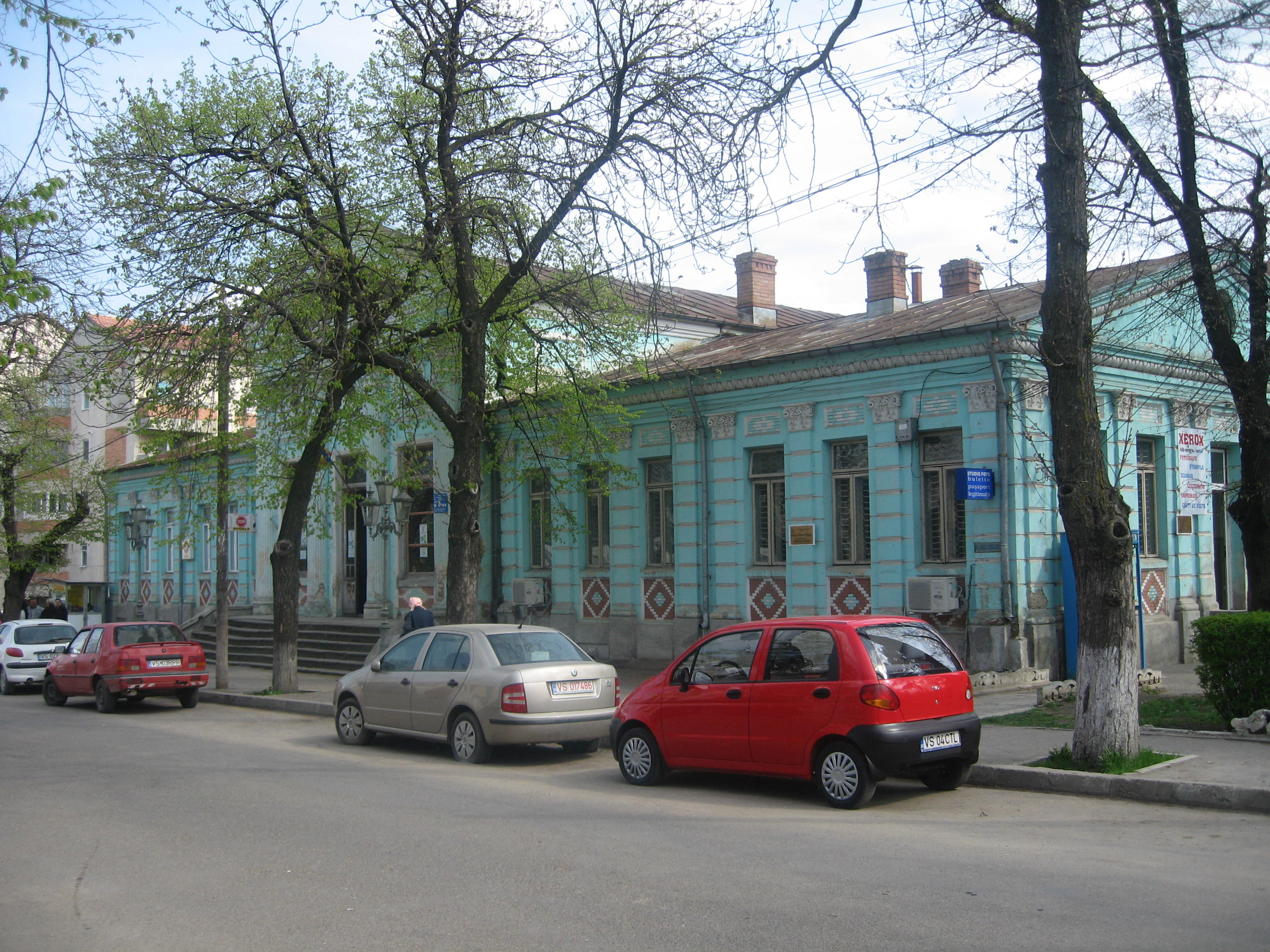
- The building of Fălciu County Court of the interwar period

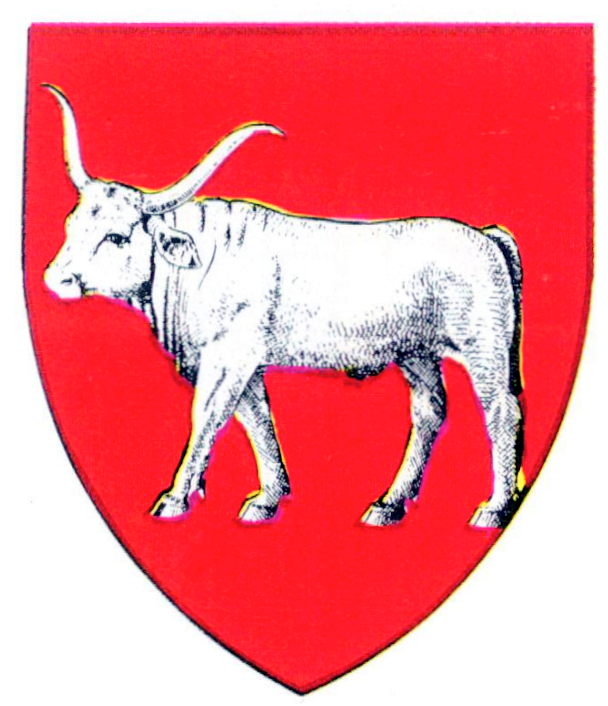
- Coat of arms

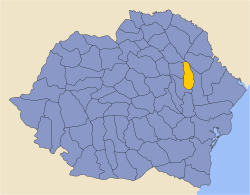
- Country: Romania
- Historic region: Moldavia
- County seat (Reședință de judeṭ): Huși

Area
  - Total: 2,120 km^{2} (820 sq mi)

Population (1930)
  - Total: 115,055
  - Density: 54.3/km^{2} (141/sq mi)

Fălciu County was an administrative division of Moldavia (until 1859), then a county (judeṭ) in Romania between 1859 and 1950. Its capital was the town of Huși. Another important town was Fălciu.

== History ==
Fălciu was a land (ṭinut) of the principality of Moldavia. After the formation of the Kingdom of Romania, it was integrated in the new administrative system as a county (judeṭ). It covered 2,120 km^{2} (820 sq mi). It was one of the most rural counties of Romania and one of the poorest. The communist regime disbanded the Fălciu County in 1950, when all counties were replaced with Soviet-style raions.

Fălciu County consisted of the western part of the current Vaslui County and the extreme southeast of the current Iași County; a small eastern part of the county now lies in Moldova. It bordered Vaslui County to the west, Iași County to the north, Lăpușna County and Cahul County to the east, and Tutova County to the south.

== Administrative organization ==
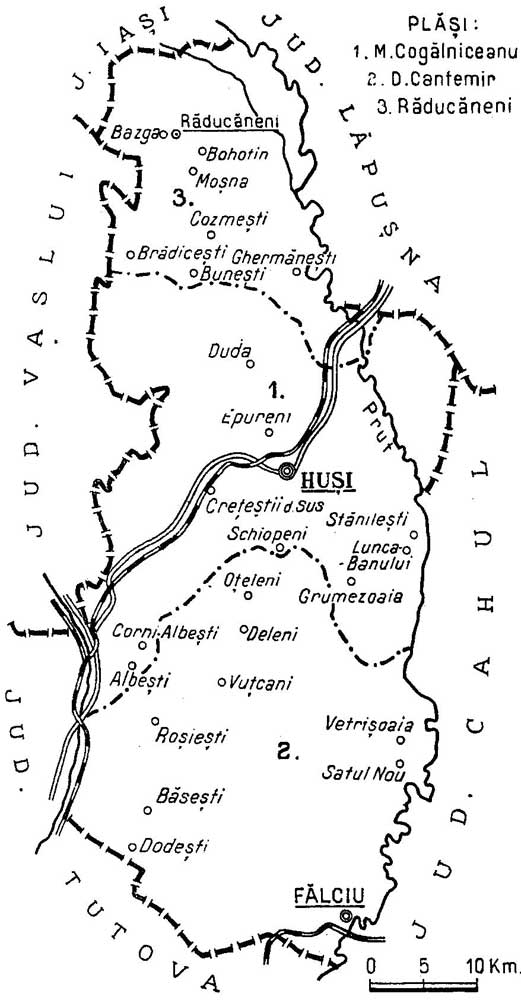
Map of Fălciu County as constituted in 1938.

Administratively, Fălciu County was divided into three districts (plăși):

1. Plasa Dimitrie Cantemir, containing 52 villages, with its seat at Fălciu
2. Plasa Mihail Kogălniceanu, containing 72 villages, with its seat at Huși
3. Plasa Răducăneni, containing 29 villages, with its seat at Răducăneni (Răducăneni district was established later)

The county had two urban communes: Huși and Fălciu.

== Population ==
According to the Romanian census of 1930, the population of Fălciu County was 115,055, of which 94.4% were ethnic Romanians, 3.1% Jews, 1.6% Romani, and 0.3% ethnic Hungarians. Classified by religion: 91.7% were Orthodox Christian, 4.9% Roman Catholic, and 3.2% Jewish.

By 1937, the estimated population had increased to 125,640.

=== Urbanization ===
In 1930 the urban population of Fălciu County was 17,130, which included 81.9% Romanians, 14.6% Jews, and 1.9% Hungarians by ethnicity. The religious mix of the urban population was 61.8% Eastern Orthodox, 23.3% Roman Catholic, and 14.7% Jewish.

== Education ==
According to the 1930 census, the county's population aged seven and older was 87,231 inhabitants, 57.5% of whom were literate. Literacy by sex was reported to be 72.5% men and 43.3% women. The school population of Fălciu County (5-18 years old) was 30,515 inhabitants in 1934 (3,121 in the urban area and 27,394 in the rural area).

In 1934, in the county there were: 1 boys lyceum, 1 girls high school, 1 boys commercial gymnasium, 1 boys industrial gymnasium, 1 girls gymnasium, 1 viticulture school, and 1 church school. In addition, there were 137 primary schools – 128 in the rural areas and 9 in the towns.

== Economy ==
The economy of Fălciu County was primarily agricultural, but often suffered from drought and lack of forests. Vineyards covered up to 4,500 hectares (11,000 acres), with those in the Huşi area well-known. The arable surface was over 138,000 hectares, about 65% of the county's surface area. Out of the arable area of the county, large estates owned over 16,000 hectares, and smallholders nearly 122,000 hectares. Most of the arable land was cultivated with cereals (corn, barley, wheat, oats, rye, millet). Cultivated meadows and other forage crops occupied approximately 12,000 hectares, forage plants almost 3,000 hectares, and factory farms about 7,000 hectares. There were also pastures on more than 21,000 hectares, and forests occupied nearly 23,000 hectares.

The lack of deposits and other natural resources, as well as the low degree of urbanization, led to poor industrial development. The small industry of the county was concentrated in Huși. In 1935, in the county there were: 58 mills, 2 oil factories (at Oltenești) and Hurduci), 2 knitwear works, 5 woolworks, 3 candleworks, 1 soapworks, 2 brickworks, 1 tannery (all at Huși), 2 timber factories (at Drânceni and Fălciu), and a pottery factory (at Răducăneni).

Trade was mainly made in agricultural products, wine, grapes, fruits, wool, and cheese. In the interwar period, the trade developed around the two important roads that crossed the county to Bessarabia: one passing through Huși and another, located in the southern part of the county, passing through Urdești and Fălciu. Along these roads there were several trading points, such as at Fălciu, which in the past had city status and a mosque, but had by the interwar years declined. On the territory of the county, several annual fairs were organized: in Huși on 14 September, in Fălciu on 24 June, in Vutcani on 15 August, in Hoceni on 14 October, in Băsești on 23 June, and in Răducăneni on 29 August.

Transportation routes were both road and railway. The road network of Fălciu County was 1,496 km (930 mi) and it was divided as follows: national roads (69 km in total, of which the General Directorate of Roads maintained 66 km of paved road, the remaining 3 km paved roads maintained by the communes), county roads (231 km cobbled, and maintained by the county administration), communal roads (1,196 km). The county was crossed by three national roads linking the following localities: Bârlad – Huși – Chișinău, Crasna – Vaslui – Iași, Bârlad – Fălciu – Comrat. Also, the county had a network of railways with a total length of 56 km (35 mi), of which 15 km of single track main lines and 3 km of single track narrow-gauge lines. The main stations were those in Crasna and Huși.

== Bibliography ==
- Dimitrie Gusti (ed.), Enciclopedia României – Volumul II: Țara Românească (Ed. Imprimeriei Naționale, București, 1938)
