= List of public schools in Chișinău =

This is a list of public high schools (lyceums) that include grades 9 through 12 in Chişinău, Moldova.

- Vasile Lupu Lyceum of Chişinău
- Dimitrie Cantemir Lyceum of Chişinău
- Aleksandr Pushkin Lyceum of Chişinău
- Nikolai Gogol Lyceum of Chişinău
- Alecu Russo Lyceum of Chişinău
- Mircea Eliade Lyceum of Chişinău
- Gheorghe Asachi Lyceum of Chişinău
- Vasile Alecsandri Lyceum of Chişinău
- Mihail Sadoveanu Lyceum of Chişinău
