= Dimitrie Cantemir (disambiguation) =

Dimitrie Cantemir was a prince of Moldavia and man of letters.

Two educational institutions bear his name:

- Dimitrie Cantemir Christian University in Romania
- Dimitrie Cantemir Lyceum in Chișinău, Moldova

Dimitrie Cantemir may also refer to three places in Romania, all named after him:

- Dimitrie Cantemir, Vaslui, a commune in Vaslui County and his birthplace
- Dimitrie Cantemir, a village in Avrămeni Commune, Botoșani County
- Dimitrie Cantemir, a village in Izvoarele, Giurgiu Commune, Giurgiu County
