= Barboși (disambiguation) =

Barboși may refer to the following places in Romania:

- Barboși, a tributary of the river Elan in Vaslui County
- Barboși, a village in the commune Hoceni, Vaslui County
- Bărboși, a village in the commune Zau de Câmpie, Mureș County
- Barboși, a neighborhood of the city Galați
- Castra of Tirighina-Bărboși, an ancient Roman fort in present Galați County
