= Epureni (disambiguation) =

Epureni may refer to the following places in Romania:

- Epureni, a commune in Vaslui County
- Epureni, a village in the commune Duda-Epureni, Vaslui County
- Epureni, a village in the commune Ungureni, Botoșani County
- Epureni (river), a tributary of the Mihona in Vaslui County
- Iepureni, a tributary of the Jijia in Iași County
