= Urdești =

- Location within Romania

Location
- Country: Romania
- Counties: Vaslui County
- Villages: Viișoara, Urdești

Physical characteristics
- Mouth: Elan
  - location: Peicani
  - coordinates: 46.2932°N 27.9850°E
- Length: 14 km (8.7 mi)
- Basin size: 44 km^{2} (17 sq mi)

Basin features
- Progression: Elan→ Prut→ Danube→ Black Sea
- Tributaries
  - left: Permoșeni

The Urdești is a right tributary of the river Elan in Romania. It flows into the Elan in Peicani. Its length is 14 km (8.7 mi) and its basin size is 44 km^{2} (17 sq mi).
