= Bridge of Flowers (event) =

1990 demonstration on the Romanian–Soviet border

- Native name: Podul de Flori
- Date: 6 May 1990; June 16, 1991
- Time: 1–7 p.m.
- Location: Romania–Moldavian SSR border
- Organized by: Cultural league for the unity of Romanians everywhere Bucharest–Chișinău Cultural Society; Popular Front of Moldova
- Participants: 1,200,000 (1990); 150,000–240,000 (1991)
- Footage: Dailymotion

The Bridge of Flowers (Romanian: Podul de Flori) was a massive demonstration that took place on Sunday, 6 May 1990 along the Prut River separating Romania and the Moldavian SSR.

== 6 May 1990 ==
The first event took place on 6 May 1990. During this action, inhabitants of Romania were allowed that day, between 1 and 7 pm, to cross the Prut River in the Moldavian Soviet Socialist Republic without passports and visas. Along the Romanian-Moldovan border of 700 km (430 mi) on the Prut, eight checkpoints were created: Miorcani–Pererita, Stânca-Costești, Iași–Sculeni, Ungheni–Ungheni Bridge, Albița–Leușeni, Fălciu–Țiganca, Oancea–Cahul and Galați–Giurgiulești.

Inhabitants from both sides of the border, which had been tightly enforced since World War II (for two decades prior to which much of Moldova had been part of the Kingdom of Romania), gathered on each bank, many crossing what had been described as a watery Berlin Wall to see family members long separated by the frontier.

The number of participants has been estimated at 1.2 million people. At Ungheni, approximately 250,000 crossed the border. The demonstration organized by the Cultural League for the unity of Romanians everywhere, in collaboration with the Bucharest–Chișinău Cultural Society and the Popular Front of Moldova, began early in the morning as thousands appeared on the Romanian side with armfuls of flowers. Participants began throwing flowers into the water that soon covered the surface of the river, symbolically creating a bridge between the two sides. At noon, a group of priests celebrated a Te Deum, after which church bells on both sides rang for a long time. Then, more flowers were thrown into the river and meetings on the bridge began to take place. Speeches, slogans and appeals were absent. Popular music and games, festive meals and similar activities followed, with the event wrapping up around 6 pm.

After this action, the procedures of crossing the Romanian–Soviet border were simplified considerably.

== 16 June 1991 ==
The second Bridge of Flowers took place on 16 June 1991. This time, the inhabitants of Moldova were able to cross the border without papers into Romania. According to a report released by Rompres, more than 150,000 people from Bessarabia crossed the border at Sculeni into Iași County. Among them was a delegation of Members of Parliament of the Republic of Moldova led by Nicolae Costin, the Mayor of Chișinău.

In Galați, in front of the Precista Church, arose on this occasion a crucifix symbolizing the union. This 1991 version of the Bridge of Flowers saw a similar number of people who attended the first Bridge of Flowers in 1990.

== Testimonies ==
This day could be a nice revenge for the fateful day of May 16, 1812, when the body of Moldova was mangled by Russia under Tsar Alexander I, as of June 28, 1940, when Stalin cut to pieces the map of Greater Romania. Our meeting with the Bessarabian brothers proves, once again, that we are one people, speaking the language of Eminescu, in the space between the Prut and the Dniester and that the Union today, which lasted only six hours, will be just a prologue of final reunion.

— Mircea Cosma, Chairman of the Prahova County Council, Ziarul Prahova

In terms of foreign policy, this event has been translated by establishing a priority for Romania to bring Moldova within the united Europe. Thus, flowers thrown 20 years ago in the Prut will find their meant shore.

— Teodor Baconschi, Minister of Foreign Affairs of Romania (2009–12), Moldova.org

It was an indescribable emotional tension. People shouted and called each other and rediscovered after years and years. At one time, on the other side of the river a man jumped into the water and began to come to the Bessarabians on the other side. My locals from Pererâta stayed speechless. They had great emotions and did not dare to make any move until a villager from Pererâta jumped into the water. After him started others. They met all in the middle of the Prut and made there, in the water, a horă, thing unseen and unheard elsewhere in the world. This is why I say that those who mock the Bridge of Flowers seem ridiculous. The tear of joy can not be bantered.

— Grigore Vieru, poet and corresponding member of the Romanian Academy, Glasul.md

The tens of thousands of Romanians on both sides pealed like a river. Romanians (west of the Prut) were the first who entered the USSR without permission.

— Ion Ungureanu, Minister of Culture and Religious Affairs of the Republic of Moldova (1990–94), Ziare.com

== Reactions ==
- (France) At the request of Mikhail Gorbachev, French President François Mitterrand asked by phone his Romanian counterpart not to commit any imprudence.
