= Casla (disambiguation) =

Casla or CASLA may refer to:

- Casla, a village in County Galway, Ireland
- Casla, Segovia, a municipality in the province of Segovia, Spain
- Câșla, a tributary of the river Elan in Vaslui County, Romania
- Club Atlético San Lorenzo de Almagro (CASLA), an Argentine football club
