= Huluboaia =

- Village
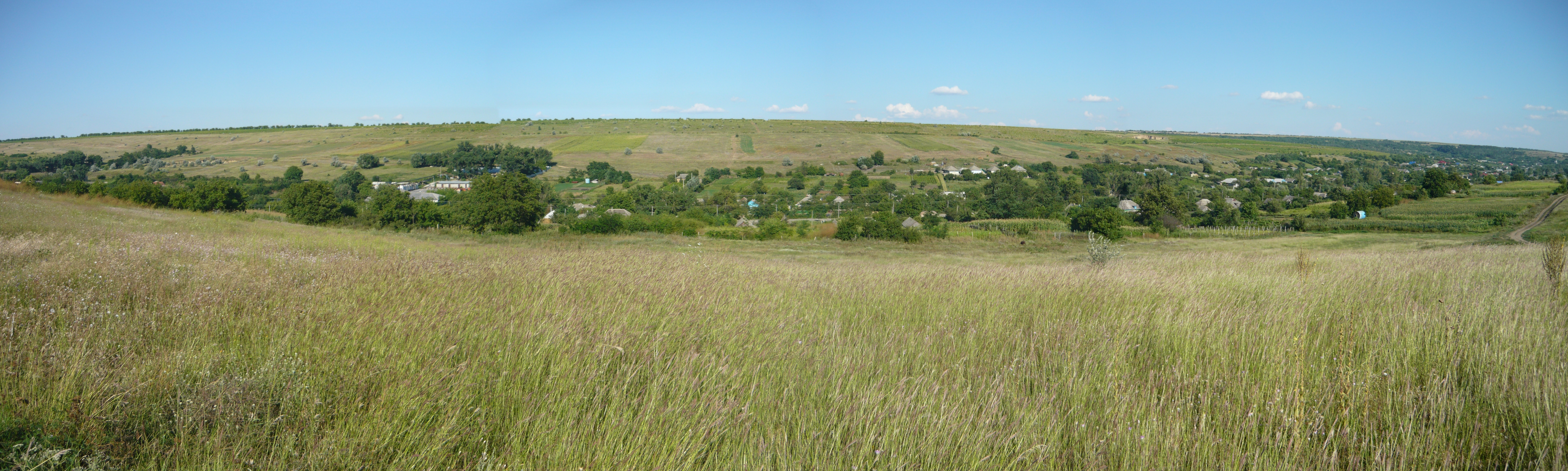

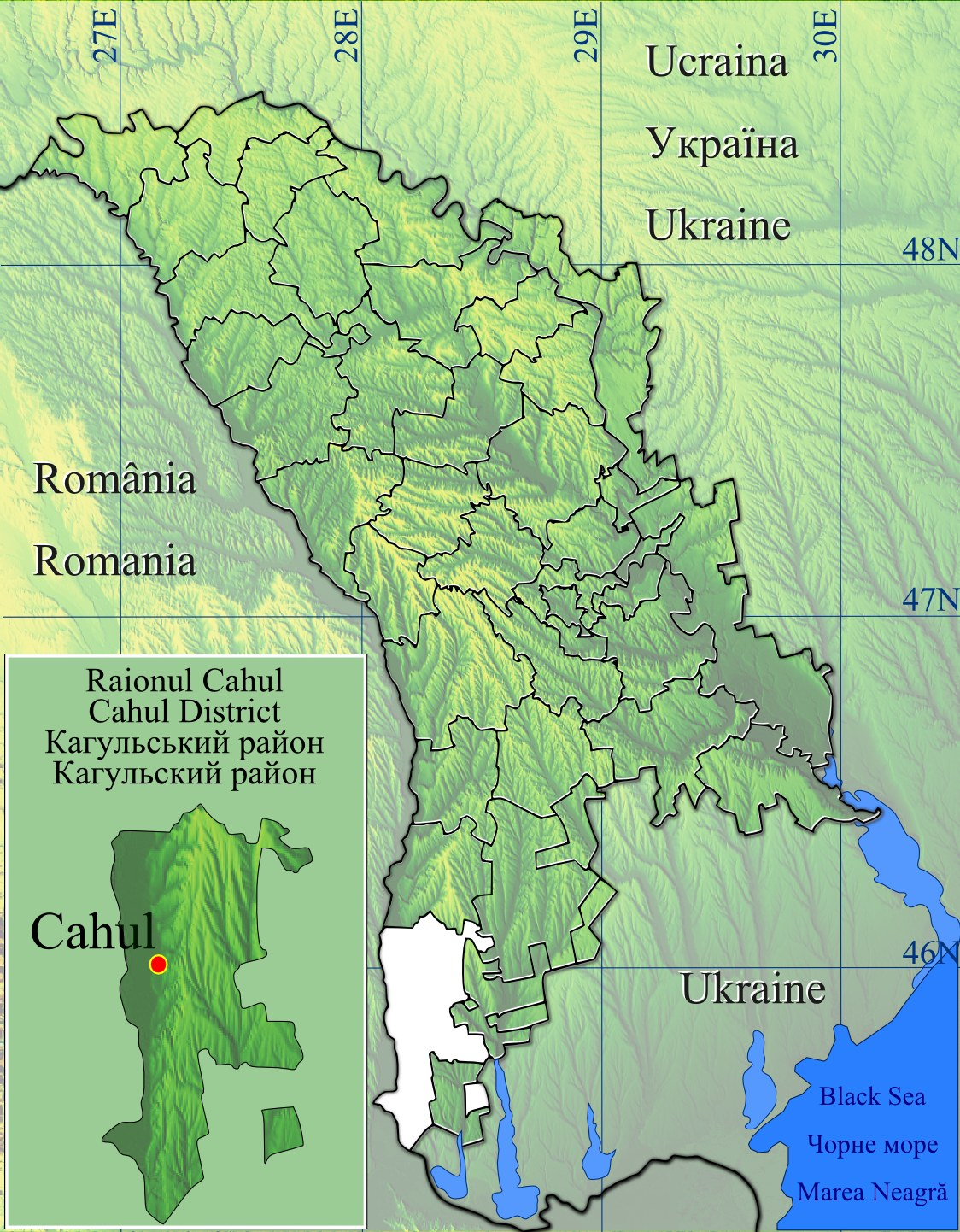
- Location within Cahul
- Coordinates: 46°3′30″N 28°20′7″E
- Country: Moldova

Government
  - Mayor: Valeriu Oboroc (PSRM)

Population (2014 census)
  - Total: 794
- Time zone: UTC+2 (EET)
  - Summer (DST): UTC+3 (EEST)
- Postal code: MD-3920

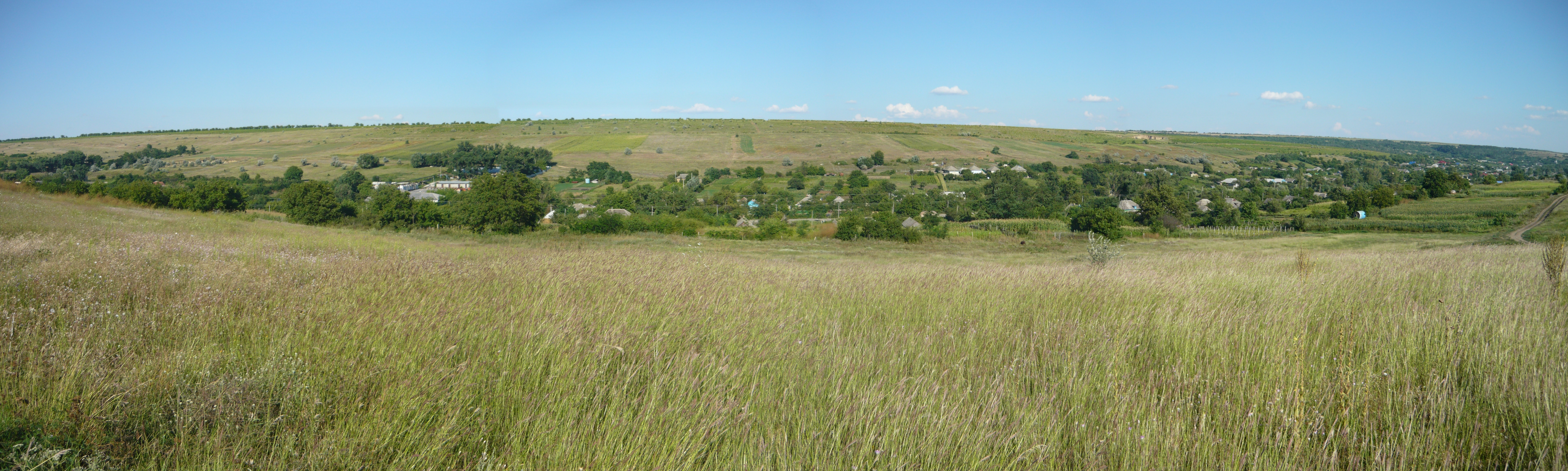
General view from the western slope of the valley

Huluboaia is a village in Cahul District, Moldova, By the 2014 census the village has a population of 794 people.

Until 1912 it was called Novohrad, in 1912 it was renamed Goluboje (Russian: Голубое). It was founded by Czechs, and has a Czech minority, which calls it Holuboje. By the fall of the Soviet Union, most Czechs returned to the Czech Republic.

== Geography ==
Huluboaia lies about 25 km (16 mi) northeast of Cahul, approximately 15 km (9 mi) from the Romanian border. It is located on the elevation 164 meters above sea level on the river Salcia Mare.

== Demographics ==
By the last census (2014) 794 people lived here.
According to the 2004 census, 1011 people lived here (494 male, 517 female).

Ethnic makeup (2004):

Ethnicity	Population	%
Moldovans	468	46,29
Ukrainians	262	25,91
Russians	79	7,81
Bulgarians	56	5,54
Gagauzs	16	1,58
Romanians	2	0,2
Other	128	12,66
Total	1011	100%

== History ==
Huluboaia was founded in the 1880s by Czechs from Ukrainian Novhorodkivka (also a Czech settlement). Because in Ukraine, there was a small amount of soil for harvesting crops, 153 migrants moved to the then Bessarabia, where they established the village Novohrad. In the year 1912 the village renamed to Holuboje (meaning „dove“ or „blue“). From the year 1934 a school functioned, where Czech was being learned.

Huluboaia today is the center of Czech countryman in Moldova. Surnames like Karásek, Pluhař or Lněnička are common here, even if the young generation speaks Czech more advisedly and use Russian.

== Present ==
From the year 2004 a Czech countryman association Novograd, is registered here, under the presidency of Ivan Lauda. The association has more than 120 members.

Most of the people, live from own agricultural activities, mostly harvesting corn and grapevine. In school functions a Czech language course (Kroužek českého jazyka Novohrádek); in the summer students from the Czech Republic arrive here, to teach Czech. The current mayor is Valeriu Oboroc.

Local russified Czechs, have worries from the alleged Moldovan nationalism, watch mainly Russian television and have a Russian stance on the Russo-Ukrainian War and the role of the US in it. Local schoolchildren are either from mixed Czech-Moldovan or Czech-Bulgarian wedlock and the Russian environment caused, that they view Russian as native.
