= Mihona (river) =

- Location within Romania

Location
- Country: Romania
- Counties: Vaslui County
- Villages: Bursuci, Epureni, Floreni, Murgeni

Physical characteristics
- Mouth: Elan
  - location: Murgeni
  - coordinates: 46.1877°N 28.0376°E
- Length: 18 km (11 mi)
- Basin size: 105 km^{2} (41 sq mi)

Basin features
- Progression: Elan→ Prut→ Danube→ Black Sea
- Tributaries
  - left: Epureni

The Mihona is a right tributary of the river Elan in Romania. It flows into the Elan in Murgeni. Its length is 18 km (11 mi) and its basin size is 105 km^{2} (41 sq mi).
