= Udrești =

Udrești may refer to several villages in Romania:

- Udrești, a village in Ulmi Commune, Dâmbovița County
- Udrești, a village in Apostolache Commune, Prahova County
- Udrești, a village in Dănicei Commune, Vâlcea County

== See also ==
- Urdești
- Urdeș
- Udrea (surname)
