= Elan (Prut) =

- Location within Romania

Location
- Country: Romania
- Counties: Vaslui, Galați
- Villages: Hurdugi, Poșta Elan, Murgeni

Physical characteristics
- Source: Fălciu Hills
- Mouth: Prut
  - coordinates: 46.0978°N 28.1022°E
- Length: 73 km (45 mi)
- Basin size: 606 km^{2} (234 sq mi)

Basin features
- Progression: Prut→ Danube→ Black Sea

The Elan is a right tributary of the river Prut in Romania. It discharges into the Prut near Vădeni, on the border with Moldova. Its length is 73 km (45 mi) and its basin size is 606 km^{2} (234 sq mi).

== Tributaries ==
The following rivers are tributaries to the river Elan:

- Left: Recea, Huluba, Oița
- Right: Grumezoaia, Cășla, Barboși, Mălăiești, Vutcani, Urdești, Jigălia, Mihona, Sărata
