= Vutcani (river) =

- Location within Romania

Location
- Country: Romania
- Counties: Vaslui County
- Villages: Vutcani

Physical characteristics
- Mouth: Elan
  - location: Poșta Elan
  - coordinates: 46.4029°N 27.9960°E
- Length: 12 km (7.5 mi)
- Basin size: 21 km^{2} (8.1 sq mi)

Basin features
- Progression: Elan→ Prut→ Danube→ Black Sea

The Vutcani is a right tributary of the river Elan in Romania. It flows into the Elan in Poșta Elan. Its length is 12 km (7.5 mi) and its basin size is 21 km^{2} (8.1 sq mi).
