= Cășla =

- Location within Romania

Location
- Country: Romania
- Counties: Vaslui County
- Villages: Șișcani, Hoceni

Physical characteristics
- Mouth: Elan
  - coordinates: 46.4585°N 28.0301°E
- Length: 15 km (9.3 mi)
- Basin size: 62 km^{2} (24 sq mi)

Basin features
- Progression: Elan→ Prut→ Danube→ Black Sea
- Tributaries
  - right: Oțeleni

The Cășla is a right tributary of the river Elan in Romania. It flows into the Elan in Gușiței. Its length is 15 km (9.3 mi) and its basin size is 62 km^{2} (24 sq mi).
