= Epureni (river) =

- Location within Romania

Location
- Country: Romania
- Counties: Vaslui County
- Villages: Horga, Epureni

Physical characteristics
- Mouth: Mihona
  - location: Epureni
  - coordinates: 46.2342°N 27.9241°E
- Length: 10 km (6.2 mi)
- Basin size: 24 km^{2} (9.3 sq mi)

Basin features
- Progression: Mihona→ Elan→ Prut→ Danube→ Black Sea

The Epureni is a left tributary of the river Mihona in Romania. It flows into the Mihona in the village Epureni. Its length is 10 km (6.2 mi) and its basin size is 24 km^{2} (9.3 sq mi).
