= Popeni =

Popeni may refer to several places in Romania:

- Popeni, a village in Căiuți Commune, Bacău County
- Popeni, a village in Brăești Commune, Botoșani County
- Popeni, a village in George Enescu Commune, Botoșani County
- Popeni, a village in Mirșid Commune, Sălaj County
- Popeni, a village in Găgești Commune, Vaslui County
- Popeni, a village in Zorleni Commune, Vaslui County
- Popeni (river), a tributary of the Trotuș in Bacău County
