= Gârla Boul Bătrân =

- Location within Romania

Location
- Country: Romania
- Counties: Vaslui County
- Villages: Vetrișoaia, Berezeni

Physical characteristics
- Mouth: Prut
  - coordinates: 46.2928°N 28.1529°E
- Length: 27 km (17 mi)
- Basin size: 346 km^{2} (134 sq mi)

Basin features
- Progression: Prut→ Danube→ Black Sea
- Tributaries
  - right: Sărata, Bozia

The Gârla Boul Bătrân is a right tributary of the river Prut in Romania. It discharges into the Prut near Fălciu. Its length is 27 km (17 mi) and its basin size is 346 km^{2} (134 sq mi).
