= Bridge of Flowers =

Bridge of Flowers could refer to:

- Bridge of Flowers (event), an event in 1990 by demonstrators who advocated for the unification of Romania and Moldova.
- Bridge of Flowers (bridge), a bridge in Shelburne Falls, Massachusetts.
