= Barboși =

- Location within Romania

Location
- Country: Romania
- Counties: Vaslui County
- Villages: Rediu, Barboși

Physical characteristics
- Mouth: Elan
  - coordinates: 46.4351°N 28.0063°E
- Length: 19 km (12 mi)
- Basin size: 41 km^{2} (16 sq mi)

Basin features
- Progression: Elan→ Prut→ Danube→ Black Sea

The Barboși is a right tributary of the river Elan in Romania. It flows into the Elan near Poșta Elan. Its length is 19 km (12 mi) and its basin size is 41 km^{2} (16 sq mi).
