= Lipcani–Rădăuți-Prut Bridge =

Lipcani–Rădăuți-Prut
- Coordinates: 48°16′N 26°48′E
- Carries: two lanes of roadway
- Crosses: Prut
- Locale: between Lipcani and Rădăuți-Prut

Characteristics
- Total length: 246 metres (807 ft)
- Width: 10.5 metres (34 ft)

History
- Opened: 1937
- Closed: 1944-2010

Location
- Interactive map of Lipcani–Rădăuți-Prut

The Lipcani–Rădăuți-Prut Bridge (Romanian: Podul Lipcani–Rădăuți-Prut) is a road bridge over Prut and a checkpoint between Moldova and Romania.

== History ==
The Rădăuți-Prut–Lipcani bridge was built up in 1937 and blasted up in 1941 by retreating Red Army, during the German-led invasion of the Soviet Union. It was rebuilt but destroyed again in 1944 during bombing in World War II. In 2000, the European Commission earmarked 11 million euros to Moldova and Romania to reconstruct the bridge. The construction was completed in 2005. The bridge is 246 metres (807 ft) long and 10.5 metres (34 ft) broad. The bridge is located more than 250 km (160 mi) away from Chișinău.

The bridge and the border checkpoint between Romania and Moldova were re-unveiled on February 15, 2010. The inauguration ribbon was cut by Prime Minister Vlad Filat, Romanian Administration and Interior Minister Vasile Blaga and the head of the Delegation of the European Union to Moldova, Dirk Schuebel. Filat noted that after 66 years, Moldovan citizens have again the possibility of crossing the bridge. Besides Filat, Moldova was represented at the event by Interior Minister Victor Catan, the head of the Customs Service Tudor Balițchi and the head of the Border Guard Service Alexei Roibu and Romania by the head of the Suceava County Council, Gheorghe Flutur, the head of the Botoşani County Council, Mihai Țîbuleac, and the prefect of Botoșani County, Cristian Roman.

The new checkpoint at Lipcani–Rădăuți-Prut will facilitate the implementation of the agreement on small-scale cross-border trade signed by the two states at the end of 2009. There are another seven Moldova–Romania border crossings.

== See also ==
- Moldova–Romania relations
- List of bridges in Moldova
- List of bridges in Romania
