= Horațiu Nicolau =

Romanian volleyball player (1933–2018)

Horaţiu Nicolau
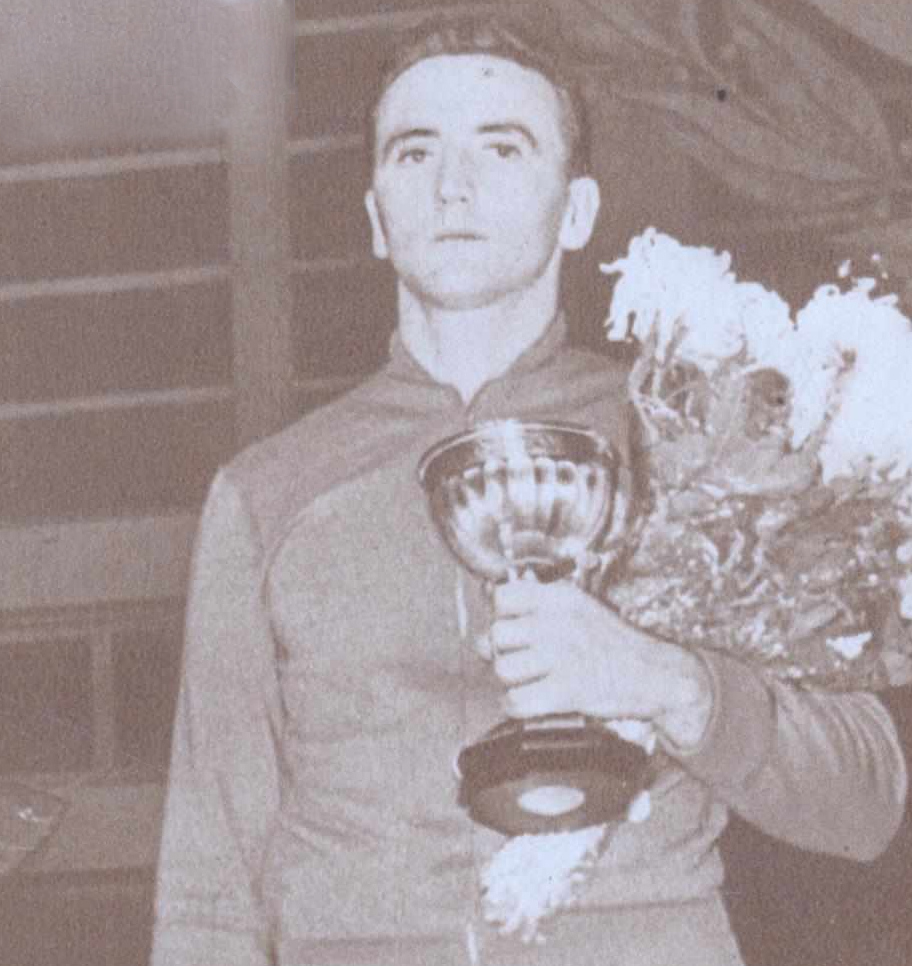
- Nicolau in 1963

Personal information
- Nationality: Romanian
- Born: 5 July 1933 Fălciu, Romania
- Died: 21 June 2018 (aged 84)

Sport
- Sport: Volleyball
- Club: CS Rapid București
Medal record
Men's volleyball
Representing Romania
World Championship
Silver medal – second place	1956 France	Team
Silver medal – second place	1966 Czechoslovakia	Team
Bronze medal – third place	1960 Brazil	Team
Bronze medal – third place	1962 Soviet Union	Team
European Championship
Gold medal – first place	1963 Romania	Team
Silver medal – second place	1955 Romania	Team
Silver medal – second place	1958 Czechoslovakia	Team

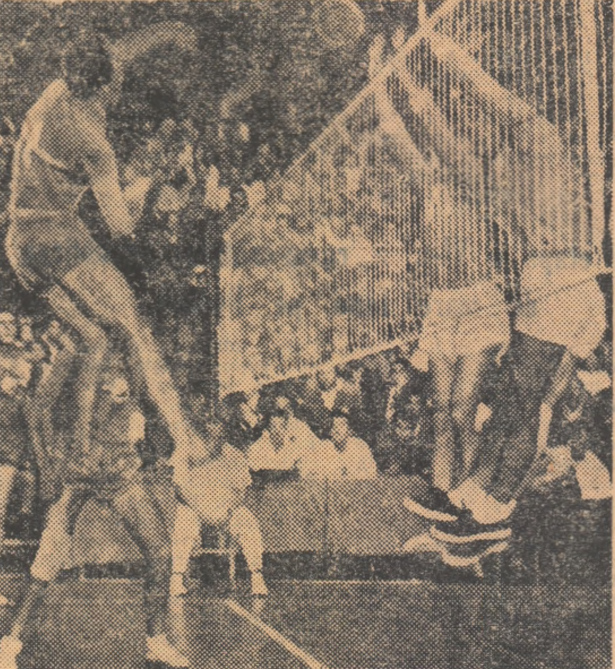
Nicolau at the 1955 European Volleyball Championship with Romania.

Horaţiu Nicolau (5 July 1933 – 21 June 2018) was a Romanian volleyball player. He competed in the men's tournament at the 1964 Summer Olympics.

After retiring as a player he coached teams in Belgium.
