= Sărata (Gârla Boul Bătrân) =

- Location within Romania

Location
- Country: Romania
- Counties: Vaslui County
- Villages: Pădureni, Berezeni

Physical characteristics
- Mouth: Gârla Boul Bătrân
  - coordinates: 46.3953°N 28.1619°E
- Length: 30 km (19 mi)
- Basin size: 236 km^{2} (91 sq mi)

Basin features
- Progression: Gârla Boul Bătrân→ Prut→ Danube→ Black Sea
- Tributaries
  - right: Șchiopeni, Mușata

The Sărata is a small river in Vaslui County, Romania. It is a right tributary of the river Gârla Boul Bătrân, which is a right tributary of the Prut. Its length is 30 km (19 mi) and its basin size is 236 km^{2} (91 sq mi).
