= Murgeni =

- Town
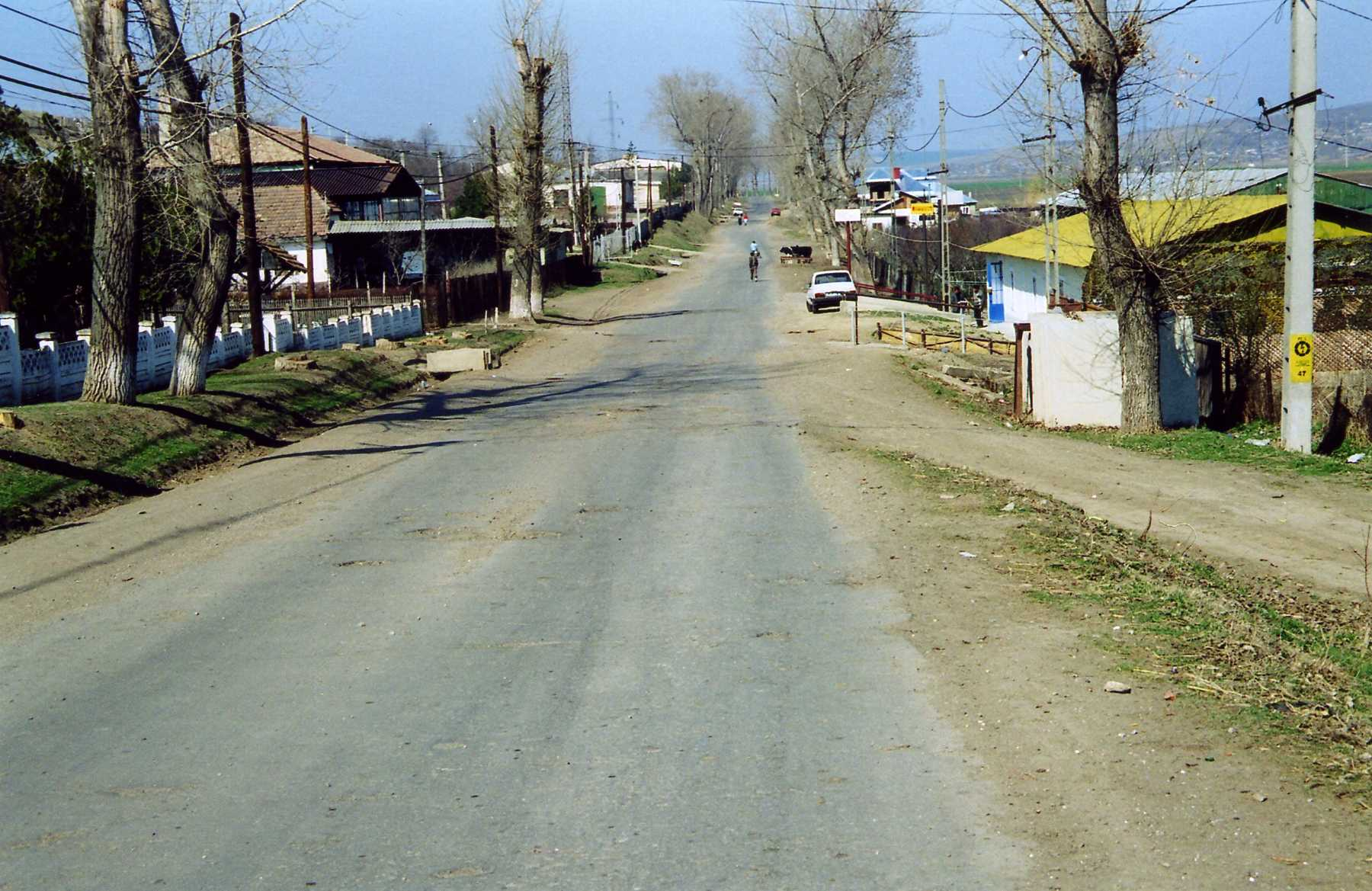

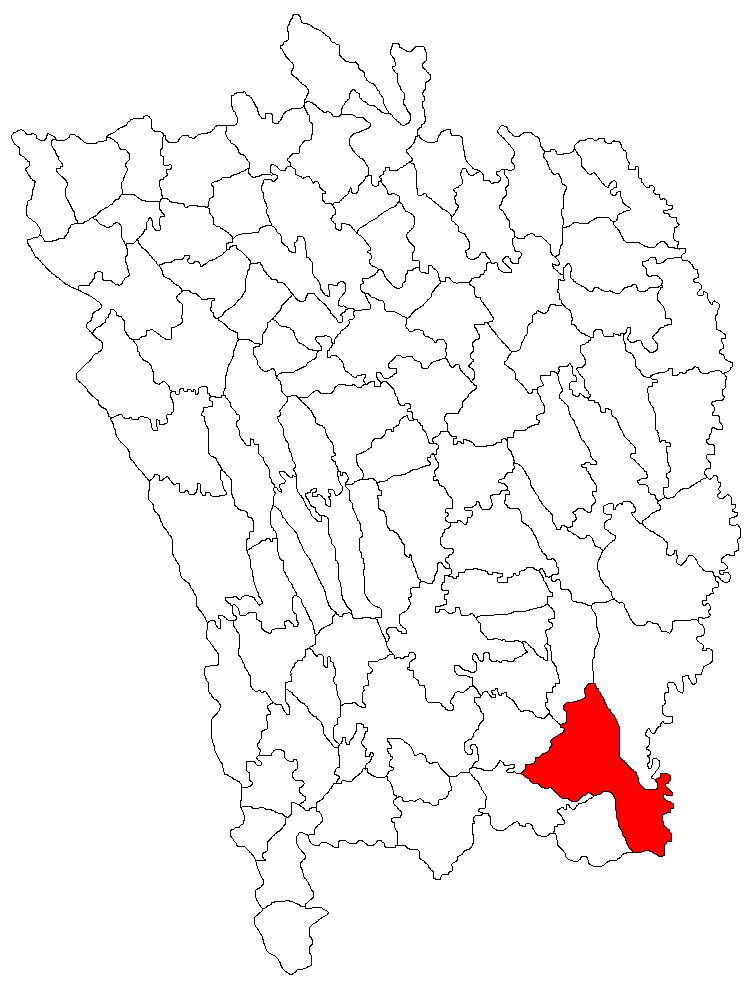
- Location in Vaslui County

- Location in Romania
- Coordinates: 46°12′N 28°1′E
- Country: Romania
- County: Vaslui

Government
  - Mayor (2024–2028): Eduard Cazacu (PSD)
- Area: 134.74 km^{2} (52.02 sq mi)
- Elevation: 35 m (115 ft)
- Population (2021-12-01): 6,853
  - Density: 50.86/km^{2} (131.7/sq mi)
- Time zone: UTC+02:00 (EET)
  - Summer (DST): UTC+03:00 (EEST)
- Postal code: 737370
- Area code: +40 (0)235
- Vehicle reg.: VS
- Website: primaria-murgeni.ro

Murgeni is a town in Vaslui County, Western Moldavia, Romania. It acquired town status in 2003. The town administers six villages: Cârja, Floreni, Lățești, Sărățeni, Schineni, and Raiu.

== Geography ==
Murgeni is located in the southeastern extremity of Vaslui County, on the right bank of the Prut River, which separates it from Moldova to the east; the river Elan and its right tributary, the Mihona, also flow through the town. The city of Bârlad is 36 km (22 mi) to the west, while the county seat, Vaslui, is 64 km (40 mi) to the northwest. To the south is Galați County.

The town is crossed by national road DN24A, which runs from Bârlad to Huși, some 60 km (37 mi) to the north. The Murgeni train station serves the CFR Rail Line 603, which joins Bârlad to Fălciu, further up on the Prut River.

== Demographics ==
Historical population
Year	Pop.	±%
2002	7,674	—
2011	7,119	−7.2%
2021	6,853	−3.7%
Source: Census data

At the 2011 census, Murgeni had a population of 7,119; of those, 69.49% were ethnic Romanians and 19.44% Roma. According to the 2021 census, the population had decreased to 6,853, of which 58.92% were ethnic Romanians and 25.48% Roma.

== Natives ==
- Constantin Balmuș (1898–1957), philologue
- Ioan Jak Rene Juvara (1913–1996), physician and academic
- Nicolae Profiri (1886–1967), engineer and communist politician

== See also ==
- List of towns in Romania with large Roma populations
