= Vetrișoaia =

- Commune
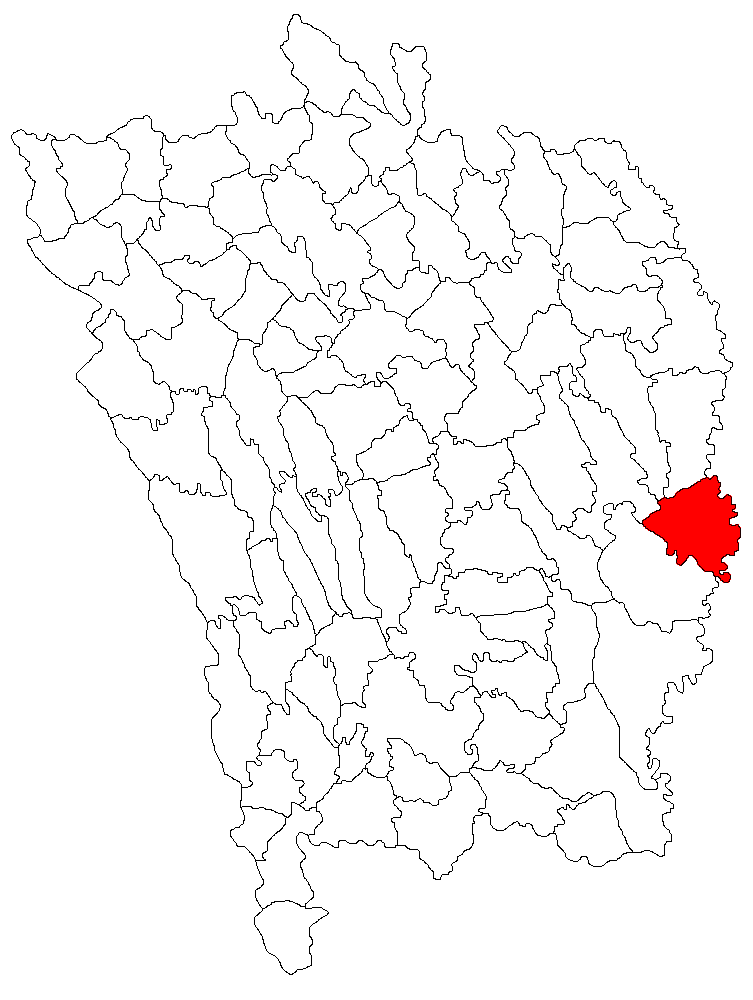
- Location in Vaslui County

- Location in Romania
- Coordinates: 46°25′48″N 28°12′30″E
- Country: Romania
- County: Vaslui
- Subdivisions: Bumbăta, Vetrișoaia

Government
  - Mayor (2020–2024): Corneliu Stîngă (PNL)
- Area: 75.18 km^{2} (29.03 sq mi)
- Elevation: 24 m (79 ft)
- Population (2021-12-01): 2,638
  - Density: 35/km^{2} (91/sq mi)
- Time zone: EET/EEST (UTC+2/+3)
- Postal code: 737570
- Area code: +(40) 235
- Vehicle reg.: VS
- Website: primariavetrisoaia.ro

Vetrișoaia is a commune in Vaslui County, Western Moldavia, Romania. It is composed of two villages: Bumbăta and Vetrișoaia.

The commune is located in the eastern part of Vaslui County, about 62 km (39 mi) southeast of the county seat, Vaslui, on the Moldova–Romania border. It lies on the right bank of the Prut River, which marks the border; the Pruteț flows into the Prut in Bumbăta village while the Gârla Boul Bătrân flows through Vetrișoaia village.
