= Udrea =

Udrea is a Romanian name and surname that may refer to:

- Udrea Băleanu (died ca. 1601), Wallachian statesman and military leader
- Elena Udrea (born 1973), Romanian politician
- Maria Udrea (born 1990), Romanian épée fencer

== See also ==
- Udrești (disambiguation)
