= Oancea =

- Commune
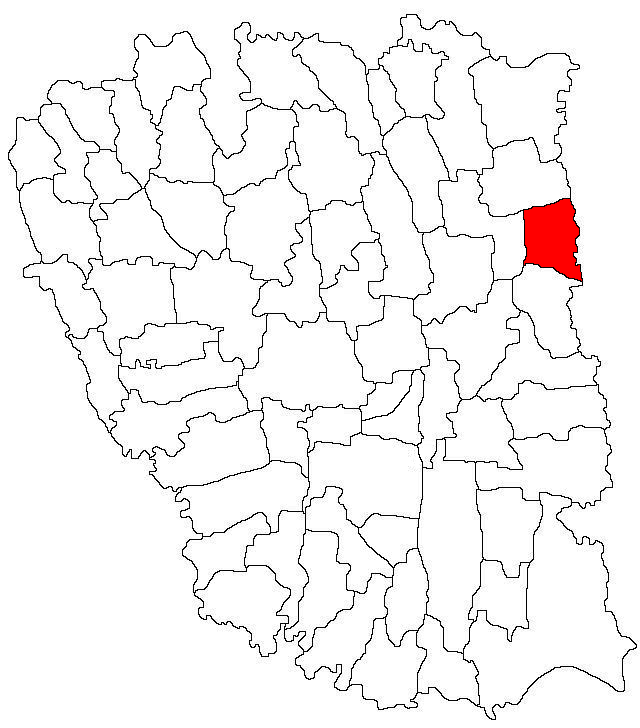
- Location in Galați County

- Location in Romania
- Coordinates: 45°55′N 28°7′E
- Country: Romania
- County: Galați
- Population (2021-12-01): 1,183
- Time zone: EET/EEST (UTC+2/+3)
- Vehicle reg.: GL

Oancea is a commune in Galați County, Western Moldavia, Romania with a population of 1,546 people. It is composed of two villages, Oancea and Slobozia Oancea.

It is also a border crossing between Moldova and Romania.

== Natives ==
- Duncan Renaldo
