= Moldova–Romania border =

International border

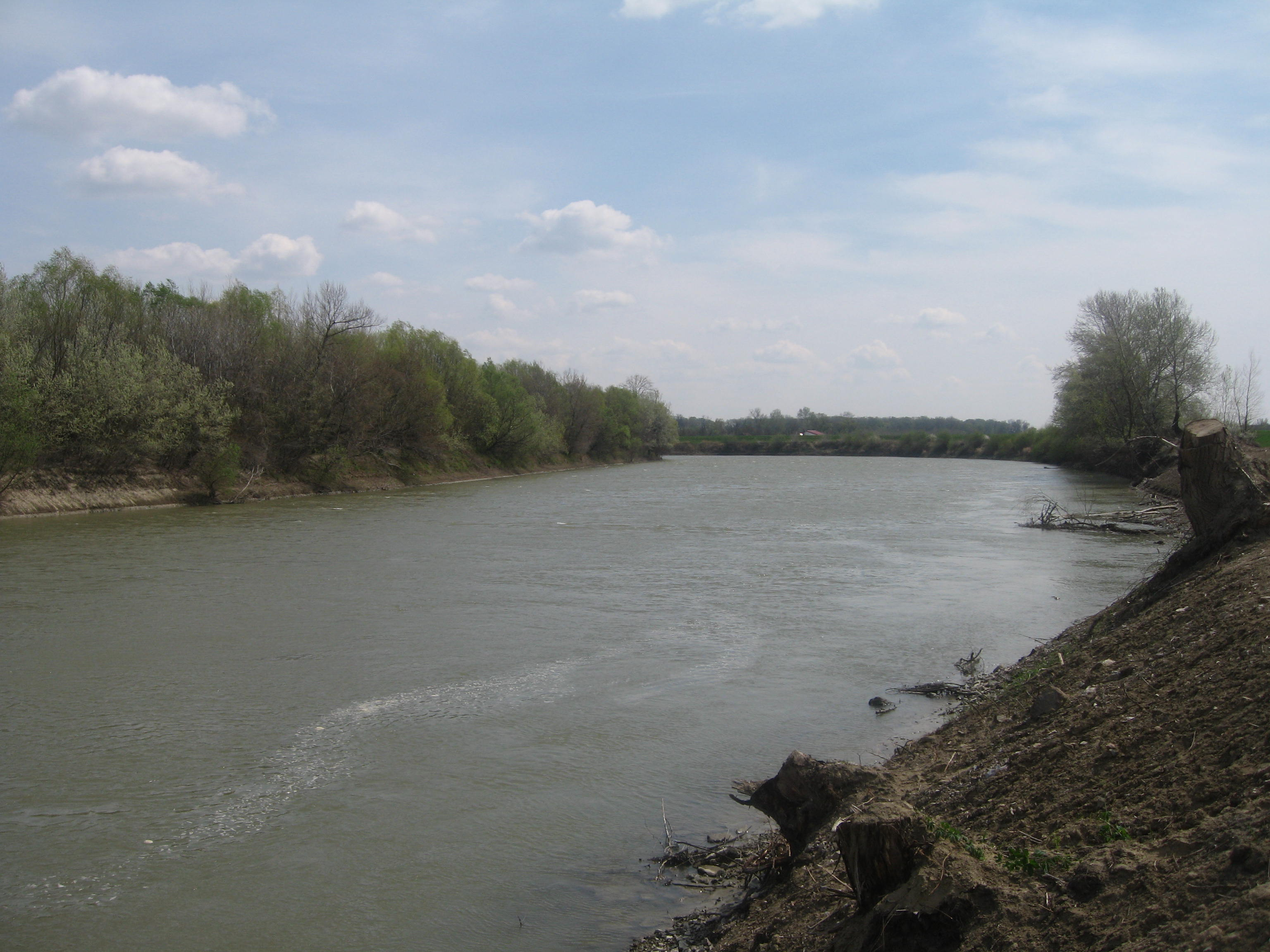
- River Prut near Albița, Drânceni

Characteristics
- Entities: Moldova Romania
- Length: 681.3 kilometres (423.3 mi)

History
- Established: 1917; Creation of the Moldavian Democratic Republic
- Current shape: 1991; Moldovan Declaration of Independence
- Disestablished: 1918; Union of Bessarabia with Romania
- Treaties: Treaty of Paris (1920), Molotov–Ribbentrop Pact, Paris Peace Treaties

The Republic of Moldova–Romania border is the international border between the Republic of Moldova and Romania, established after the dissolution of the Soviet Union. It is a fluvial boundary, following the course of the Prut and Danube. The boundary is 681.3 kilometres (423.3 miles) long, including 570 metres (1,870 ft) along the Danube.

It is part of the external border of the European Union that runs from Criva (48°15′50″N 26°37′30″E) in the north-west to Giurgiulești (45°28′00″N 28°12′50″E) in the south-east.

== Border crossings ==
External image
- Moldova international border crossing points

A list of border crossings along the border between Republic of Moldova and Romania (North to South).

Checkpoints
Crossing	Moldova	Romania	Road / Rail Crossing	Notes
Lipcani-Rădăuți Bridge	Lipcani	Rădăuți-Prut	Road	08:00 – 20:00 service year round
Stânca-Costești Dam	Costești	Stânca, Ștefănești	Road	24-hour service year round
Sculeni Bridge	Sculeni	Sculeni, Victoria	Road	24-hour service year round
Eiffel Bridge	Ungheni	Ungheni, Iași	Rail	
Leușeni-Albița Bridge	Leușeni	Albița, Drânceni	Road	24-hour service year round
Leova-Bumbăta Bridge	Leova	Bumbăta, Vetrișoaia	Road	24-hour service year round
Stoianovca-Fălciu Bridge	Stoianovca	Fălciu	Rail	
Cahul-Oancea Bridge	Cahul	Oancea	Road	24-hour service year round
Galați-Giurgiulești Bridge	Giurgiulești	Galați	Road, Rail	Road - 24-hour service year round

Opening times vary from crossing to crossing as well as from season to season.

== Gallery ==
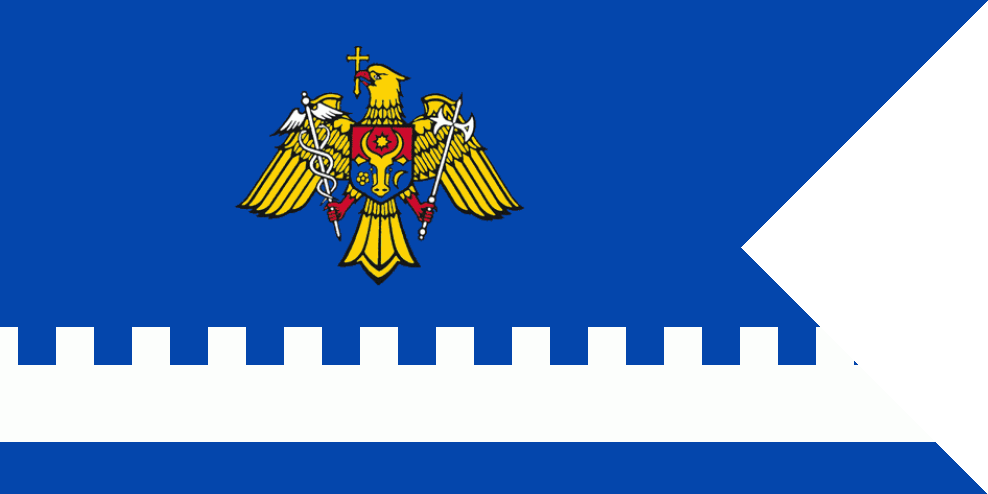
Customs ensign of Moldova

Border Guard Service flag of Moldova

Romanian Border Police

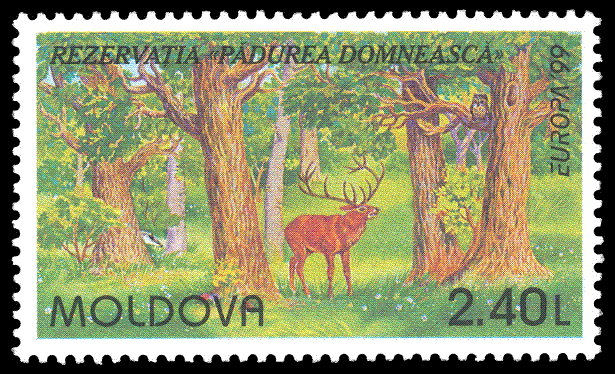
Pădurea Domnească is a natural reservation along the border

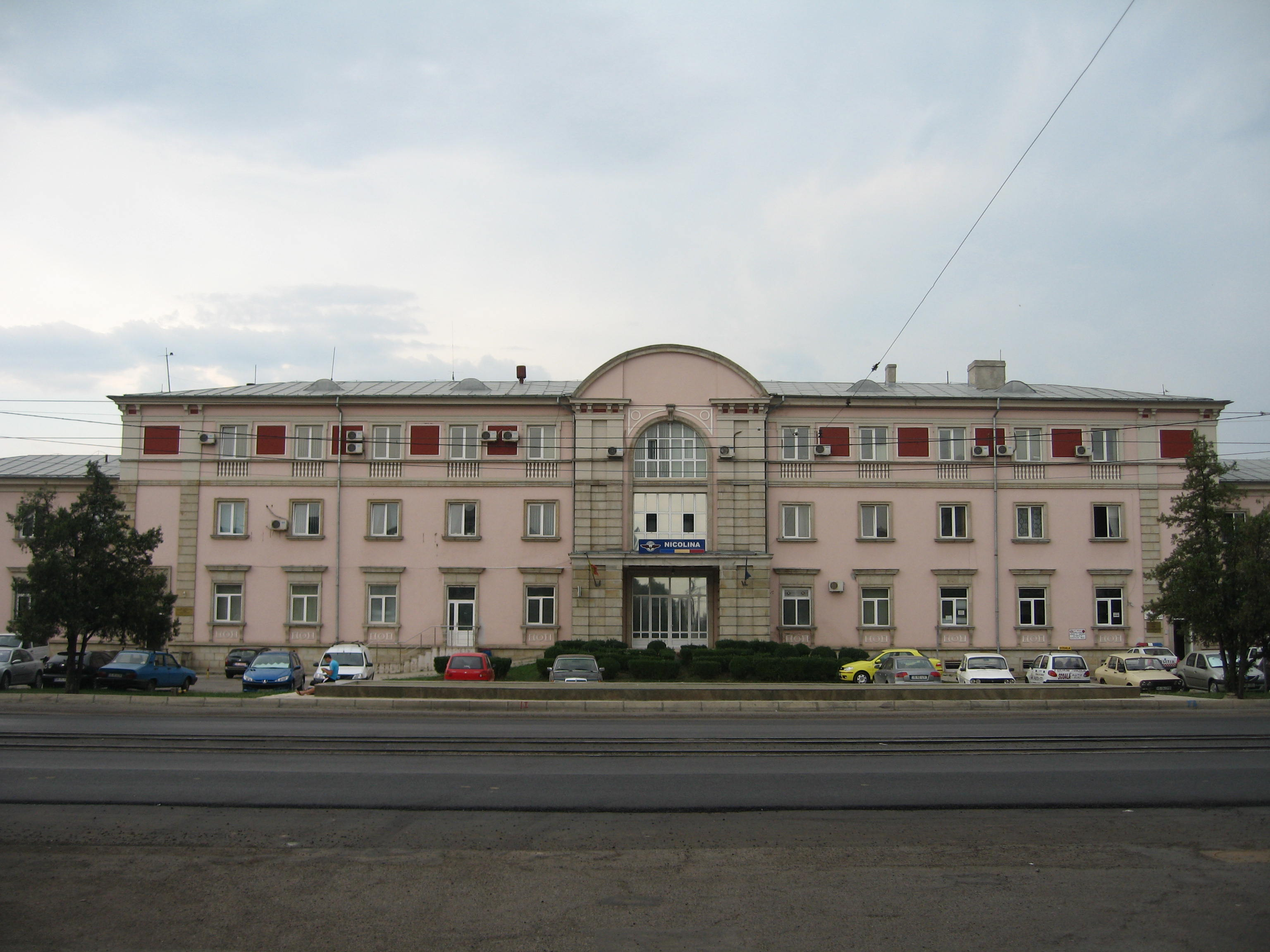
Nicolina railway station in Iași

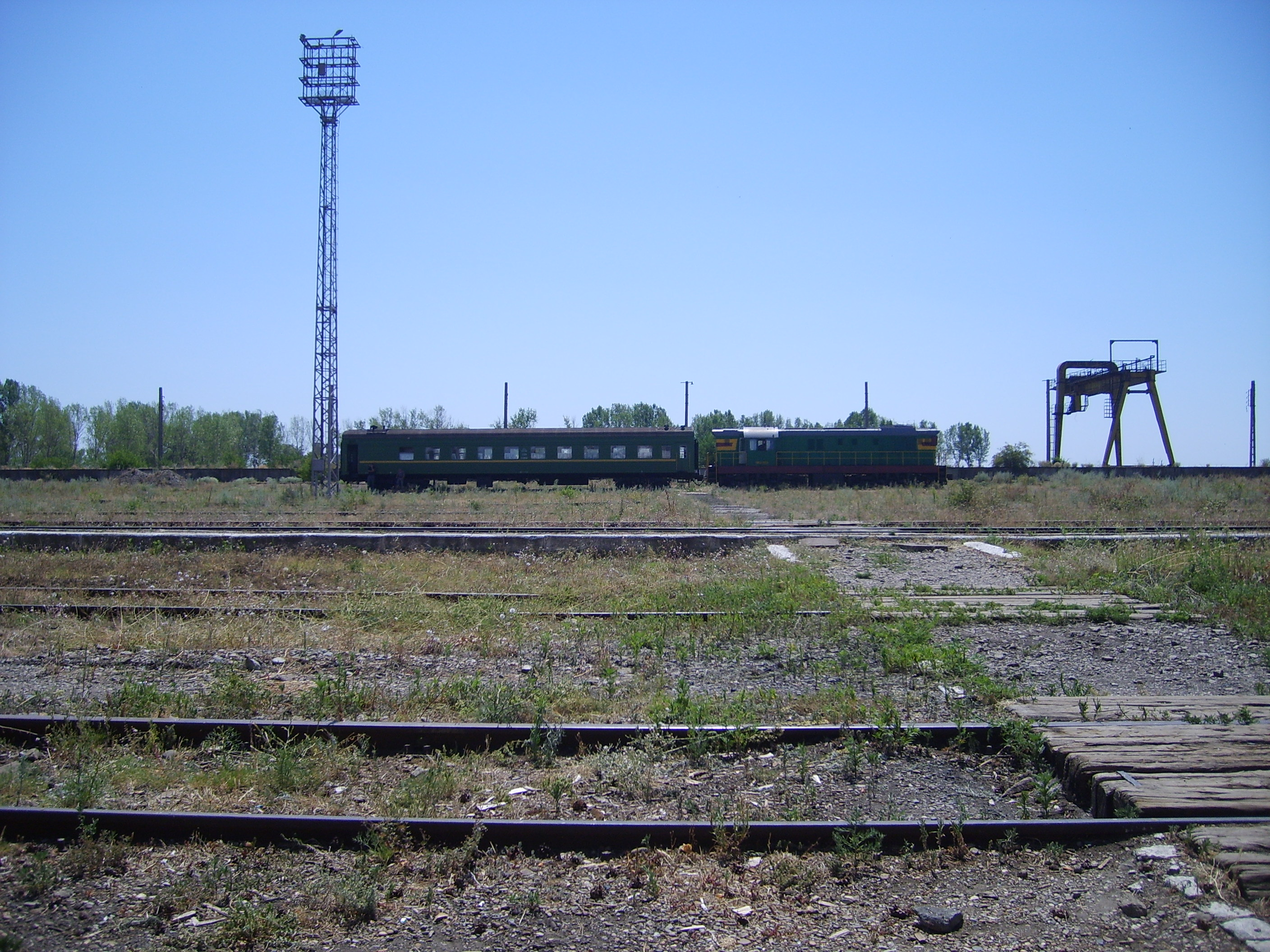
Fălciu railway station

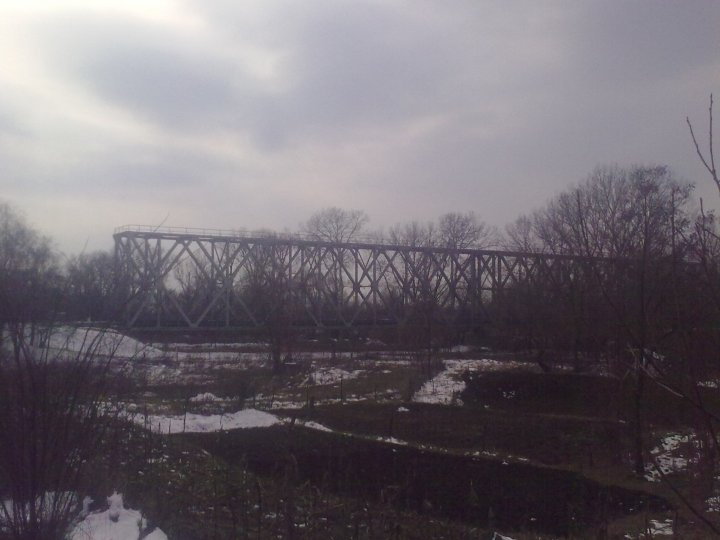
Eiffel Bridge, Ungheni

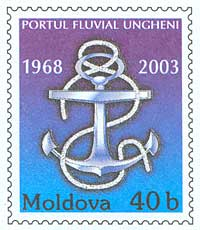
Ungheni river port

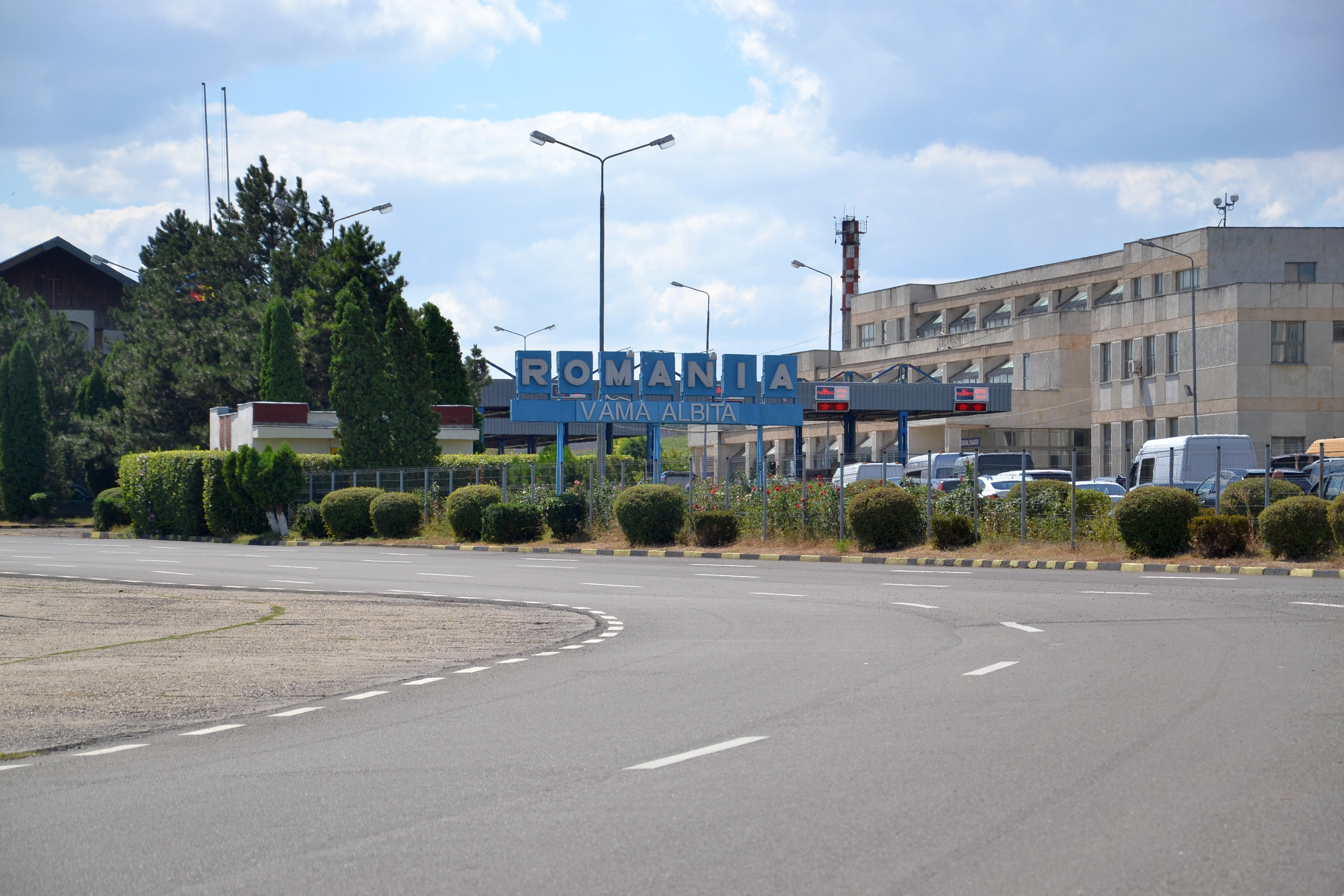
Border crossing Leușeni-Albița (view from Moldova)

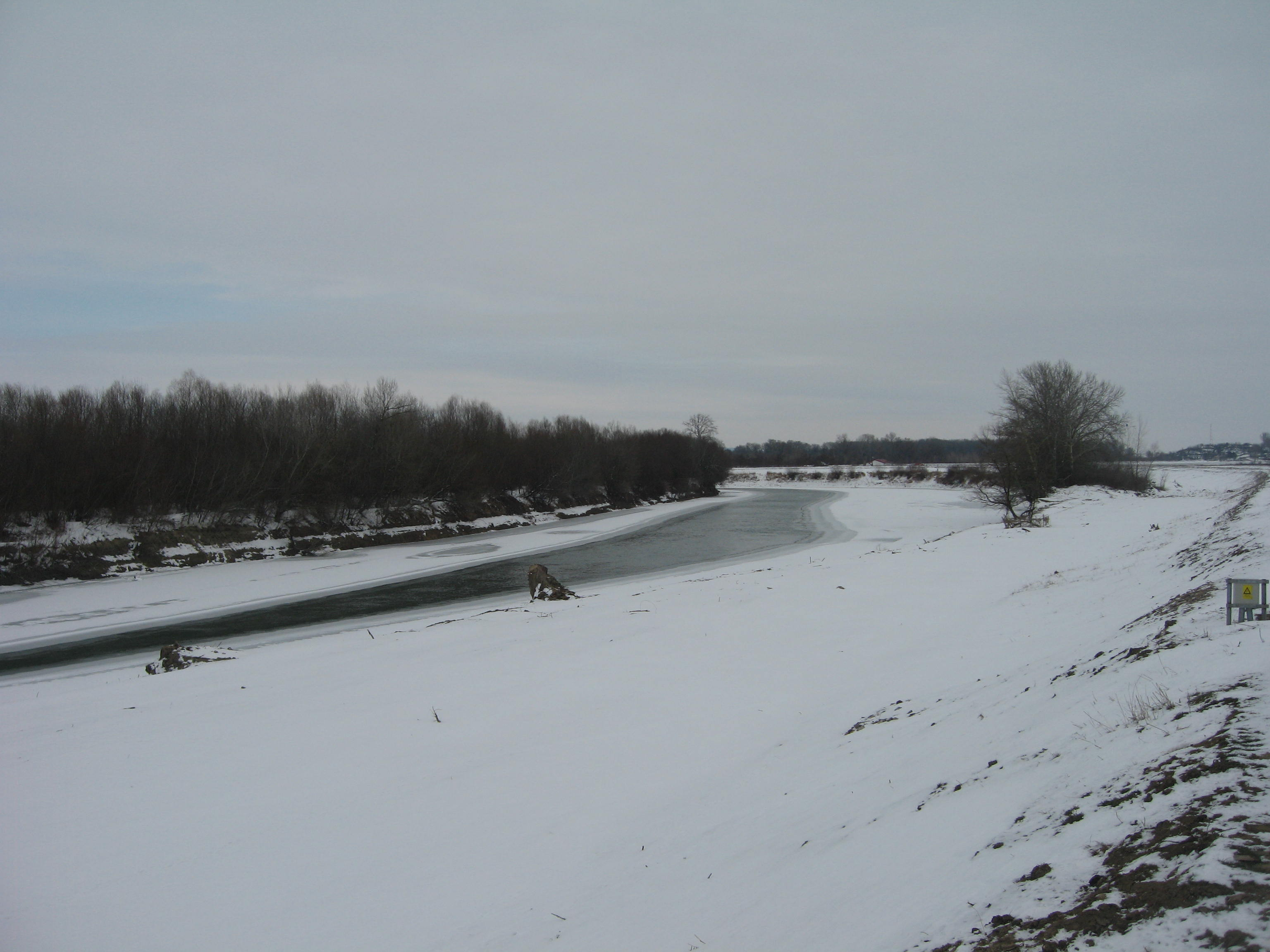
Prut near Leușeni-Albița

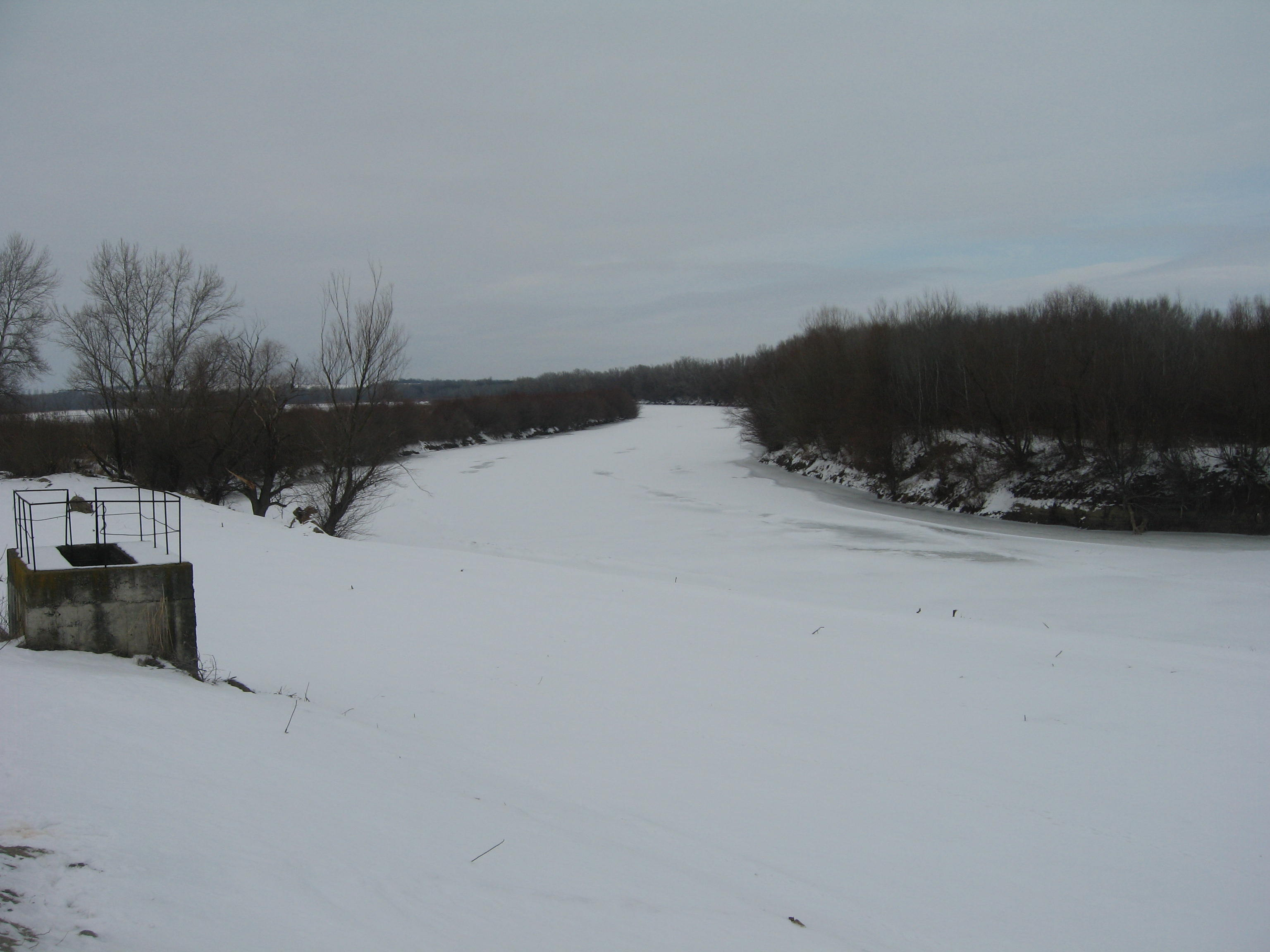
Prut near Leuşeni-Albița

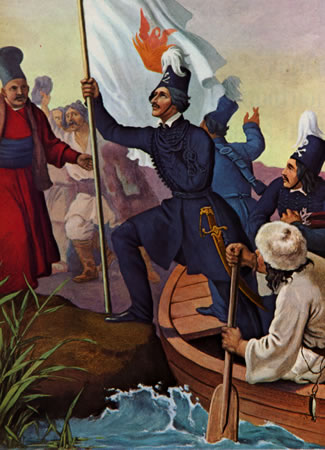
Sculeni, 1821. Ypsilantis crosses the Prut, then a border between Moldavia and Bessarabia (part of Russian Empire)

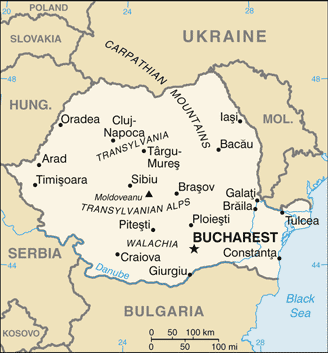
Political map of Romania

== See also ==
- Bridge of Flowers (event)
- Moldova–Ukraine border
