= Rădăuți-Prut =

- Commune
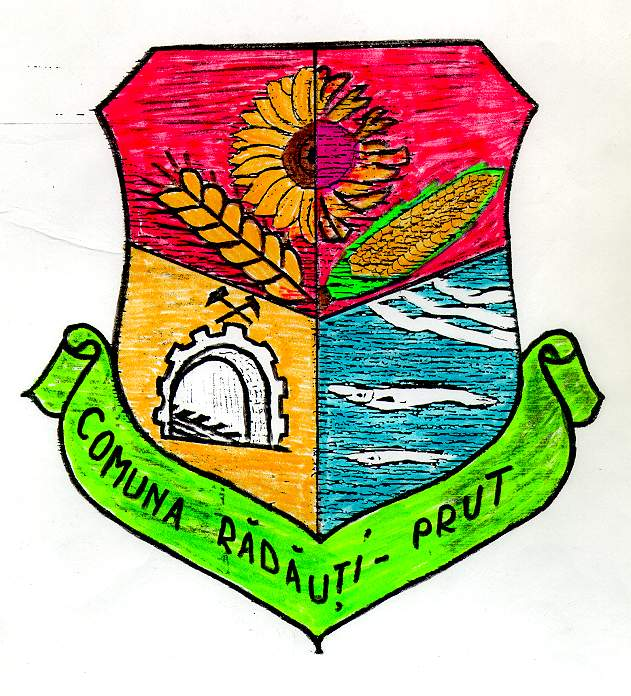
- Coat of arms

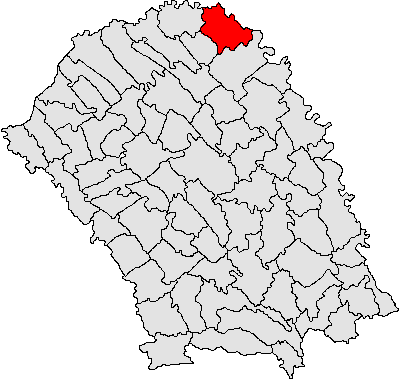
- Location in Botoșani County

- Location in Romania
- Coordinates: 48°14′N 26°48′E
- Country: Romania
- County: Botoșani
- Subdivisions: Rădăuți-Prut, Miorcani, Rediu

Government
  - Mayor (2024–2028): Viorel Nichiteanu (PNL)
- Area: 79.86 km^{2} (30.83 sq mi)
- Elevation: 126 m (413 ft)
- Population (2021-12-01): 2,667
  - Density: 33.40/km^{2} (86.50/sq mi)
- Time zone: UTC+02:00 (EET)
  - Summer (DST): UTC+03:00 (EEST)
- Postal code: 717315
- Area code: +40 x31
- Vehicle reg.: BT

Rădăuți-Prut is a commune in Botoșani County, Western Moldavia, Romania, composed of three villages: Miorcani, Rădăuți-Prut and Rediu. It was seriously affected by floods in July 2008.

Rădăuți-Prut is also a border crossing point between Moldova and Romania.

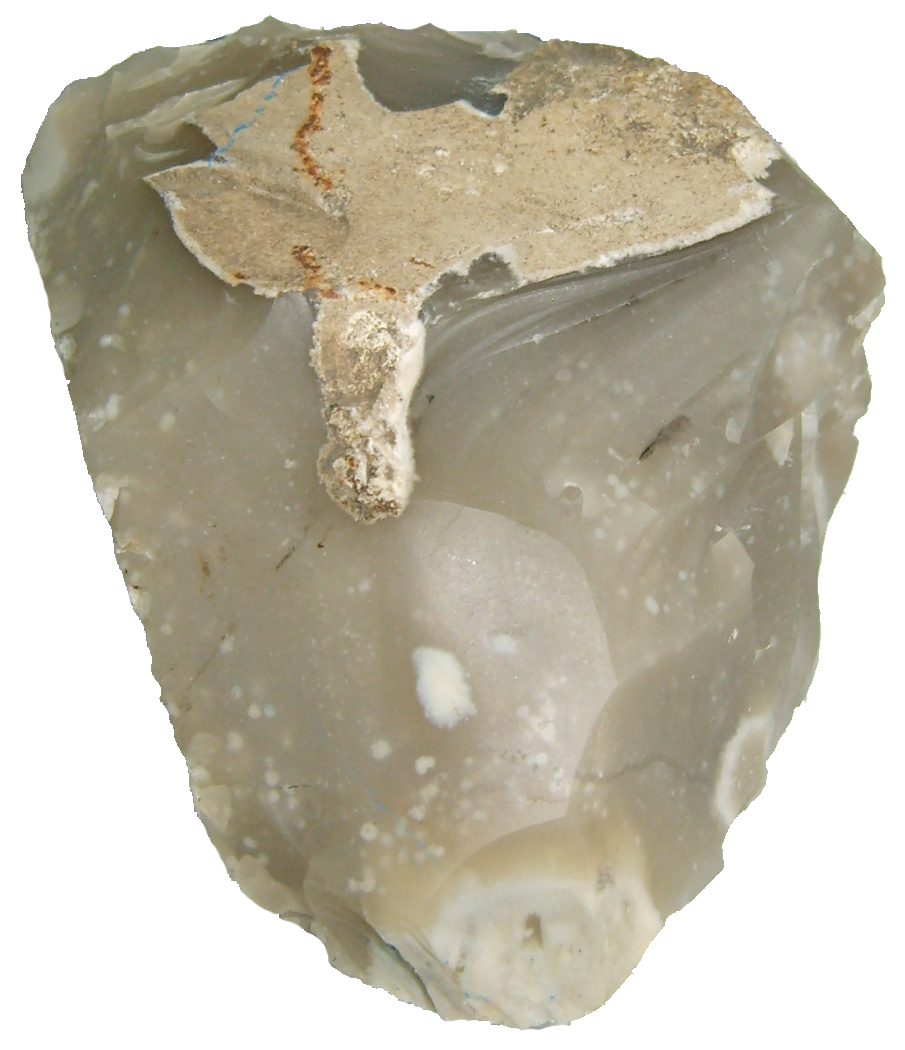
A sample of Miorcani flint from the Cenomanian chalky marl layer of the Moldavian Plateau. (ca. 7.5 cm wide)

The only modern flint mine in Romania is located at the edge of Miorcani. Although archaeological evidence indicates that flint from this formation was collected from the Prut, Raut and Dniester rivers as early as the Palaeolithic, there is yet no evidence of mining the material until the 19th century. The nodules of flint extracted from the Miorcani flint mines are used to help grind sand for use in glass and ceramics production. The mines are currently administrated by Mindo S.A.

== See also ==
- Lipcani–Rădăuți-Prut Bridge
