= Vasile Lupu Lyceum =

Moldavian school

Vasile Lupu Lyceum: Romanian: Liceul Teoretic „Vasile Lupu"; Russian: Лицей имени Василия Лупу

Information
- Funding type: Public

Vasile Lupu Lyceum (Romanian: Liceul Teoretic „Vasile Lupu"; Russian: Лицей имени Василия Лупу) of Chişinău, Moldova is a public school. It is named after Vasile Lupu, Moldavian voivod.
