= Casla, Segovia =

Casla
- Municipality
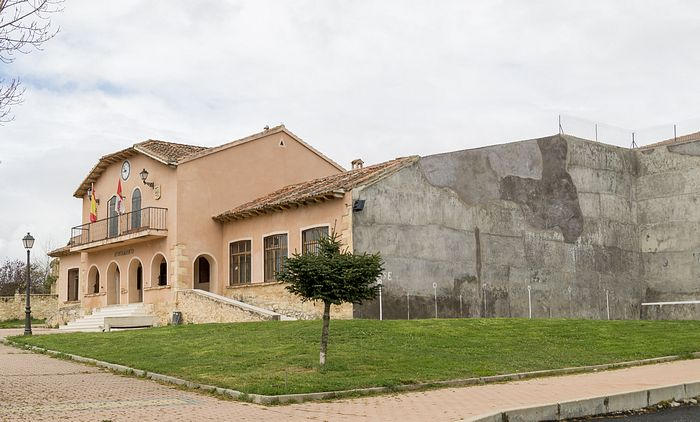

- Coat of arms

- Location in Spain. Casla (Spain)
- Coordinates: 41°09′57″N 3°39′23″W
- Country: Spain
- Community: Castile and León
- Province: Segovia

Area
  - Total: 17.59 km^{2} (6.79 sq mi)
- Elevation: 1,084 m (3,556 ft)

Population (2025-01-01)
  - Total: 155
  - Density: 8.81/km^{2} (22.8/sq mi)
- Time zone: UTC+1 (CET)
  - Summer (DST): UTC+2 (CEST)
- Website: Official website

Casla is a municipality located in the province of Segovia, Castile and León, Spain.
