= Dodești =

- Commune
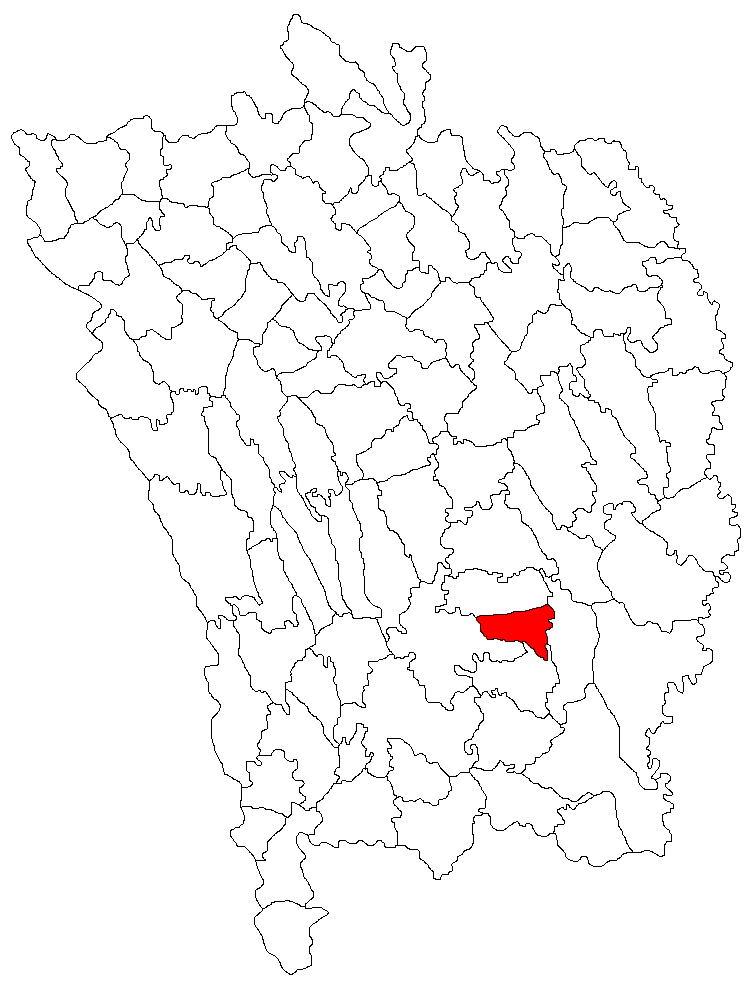
- Location in Vaslui County

- Location in Romania
- Coordinates: 46°21′N 27°53′E
- Country: Romania
- County: Vaslui
- Subdivisions: Dodești, Urdești

Government
  - Mayor (2020–2024): Loredana-Elena Cerbu (PSD)
- Area: 22.75 km^{2} (8.78 sq mi)
- Population (2021-12-01): 1,544
  - Density: 68/km^{2} (180/sq mi)
- Time zone: EET/EEST (UTC+2/+3)
- Vehicle reg.: VS
- Website: www.comunadodesti.ro

Dodești is a commune in Vaslui County, Western Moldavia, Romania. It is composed of two villages, Dodești and Urdești. These were part of Viișoara Commune until 2004, when they were split off.
