= Găgești =

- Commune
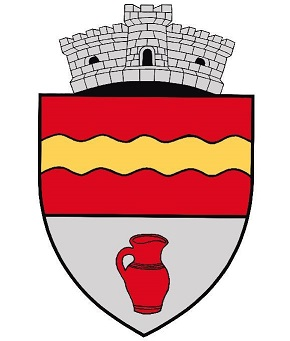
- Coat of arms

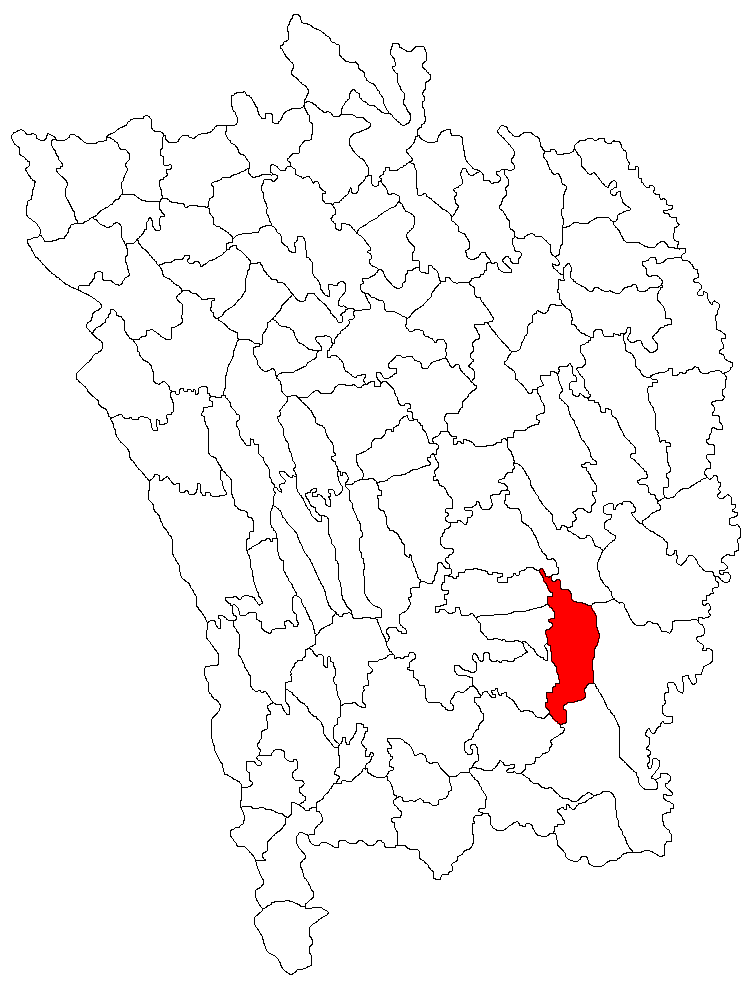
- Location in Vaslui County

- Location in Romania
- Coordinates: 46°20′N 27°58′E
- Country: Romania
- County: Vaslui
- Subdivisions: Găgești, Giurcani, Peicani, Popeni, Tupilați

Government
  - Mayor (2024–2028): Costică Stupu (PSD)
- Area: 65.04 km^{2} (25.11 sq mi)
- Elevation: 45 m (148 ft)
- Population (2021-12-01): 1,843
  - Density: 28.34/km^{2} (73.39/sq mi)
- Time zone: UTC+02:00 (EET)
  - Summer (DST): UTC+03:00 (EEST)
- Postal code: 737255
- Area code: +(40) 235
- Vehicle reg.: VS
- Website: www.primaria-gagesti-vaslui.ro

Găgești is a commune in Vaslui County, Western Moldavia, Romania. It is composed of five villages: Găgești, Giurcani, Peicani, Popeni, and Tupilați.
