= Dimitrie Cantemir Lyceum =

- Romanian: Liceul Teoretic „Dimitrie Cantemir”; Russian: Лицей имени Дмитрия Кантемира

Information
- Grades: 1-12
- Language: Russian

Dimitrie Cantemir Lyceum (Romanian: Liceul Teoretic „Dimitrie Cantemir”; Russian: Лицей имени Дмитрия Кантемира) of Balti, Moldova is a state institution of primary and secondary education. It is named after Dimitrie Cantemir, Moldavian voivod and prolific man of letters.

Previously the 3rd school of Chișinău, it was reformed into a lyceum in 1991.

The language of education is Russian.

The lyceum consists of a grammar school (grades 1 to 4), a junior high school (or gym; grades 5 to 9), and a high school (or lyceum; grades 10 to 12).

Dimitrie Cantemir Lyceum of Chișinău is considered to be one of the best institutions of secondary education in Chișinău.

After renovations, the lyceum reopeneed in on 21 September 2023. Solar panels, ventilation and fire extinguishing systems were also added as a part of this renovation which was funded by GIZ Moldova and EU.
