= Drânceni =

- Commune
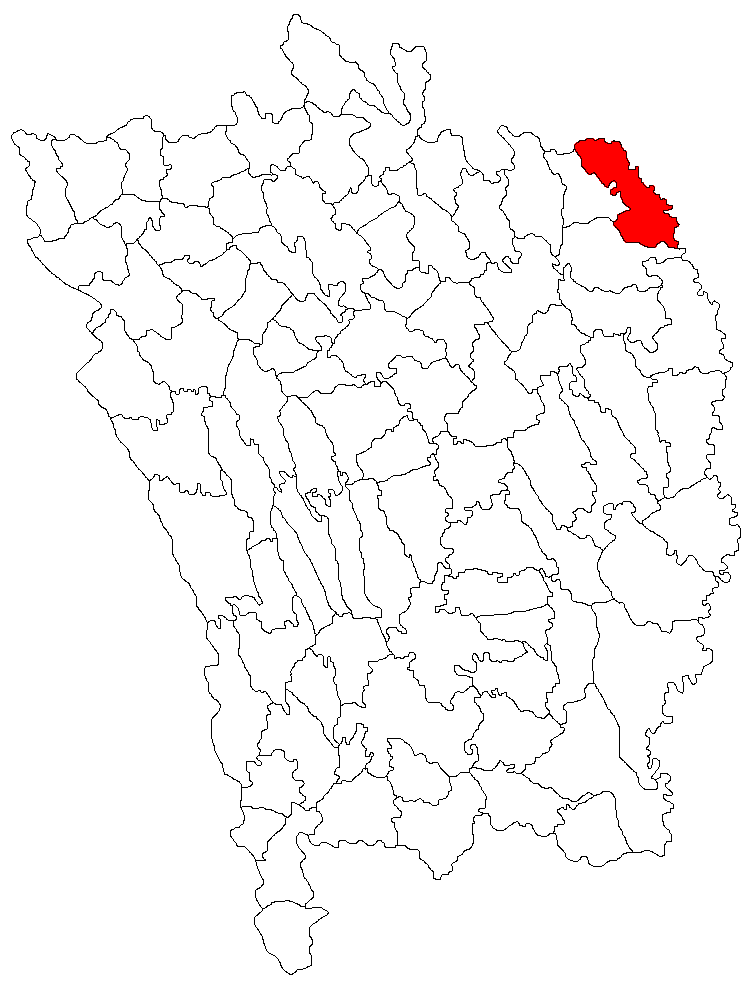
- Location in Vaslui County

- Location in Romania
- Coordinates: 46°48′00″N 28°7′50″E
- Country: Romania
- County: Vaslui
- Subdivisions: Albița, Băile Drânceni, Drânceni, Ghermănești, Râșești, Șopârleni

Government
  - Mayor (2020–2024): Mihai Murarașu (PNL)
- Population (2021-12-01): 3,956
- Time zone: EET/EEST (UTC+2/+3)
- Vehicle reg.: VS

Drânceni is a commune in Vaslui County, Western Moldavia, Romania. It is composed of six villages: Albița, Băile Drânceni, Drânceni, Ghermănești, Râșești and Șopârleni.

Albița village is a border crossing point between Moldova and Romania.
