= Viișoara, Vaslui =

Viișoara
- Commune
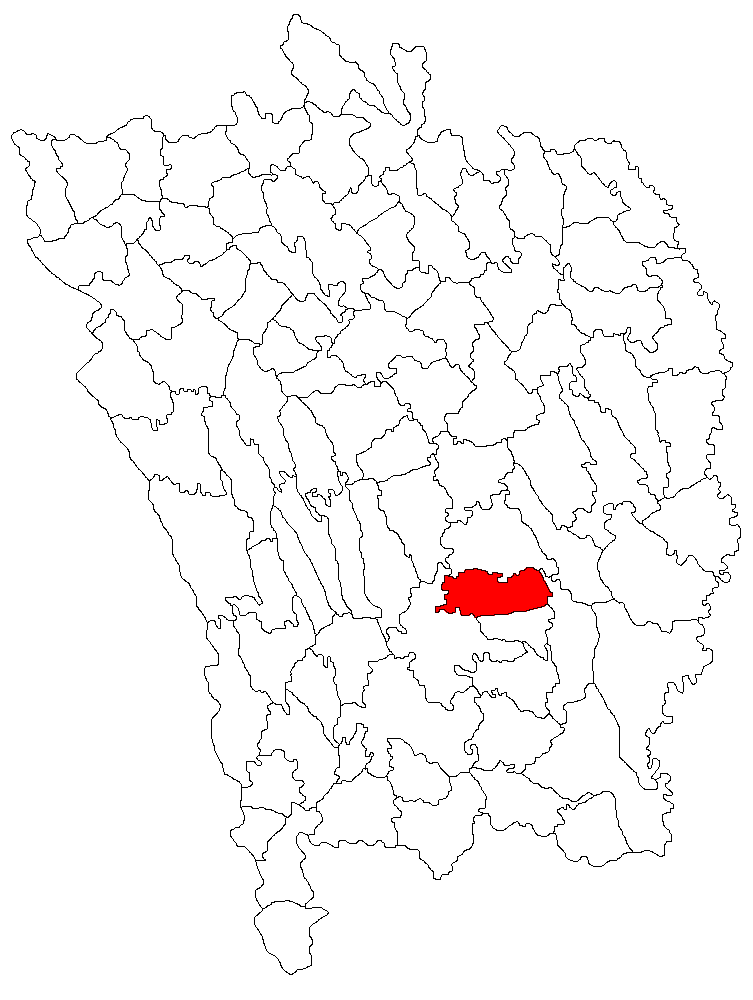
- Location in Vaslui County

- Location in Romania
- Coordinates: 46°22′48″N 27°52′48″E
- Country: Romania
- County: Vaslui
- Subdivisions: Halta Dodești, Văleni, Viișoara, Viltotești

Government
  - Mayor (2020–2024): Liviu Pîrciu (PSD)
- Area: 51.11 km^{2} (19.73 sq mi)
- Population (2021-12-01): 1,535
  - Density: 30/km^{2} (78/sq mi)
- Time zone: EET/EEST (UTC+2/+3)
- Vehicle reg.: VS
- Website: www.primariaviisoara.ro

Viișoara (called Băsești until 1968) is a commune in Vaslui County, Western Moldavia, Romania. It is composed of four villages: Halta Dodești, Văleni, Viișoara and Viltotești. It included Dodești and Urdești villages until 2004, when these were split off to form Dodești Commune.
