= Epureni =

- Commune
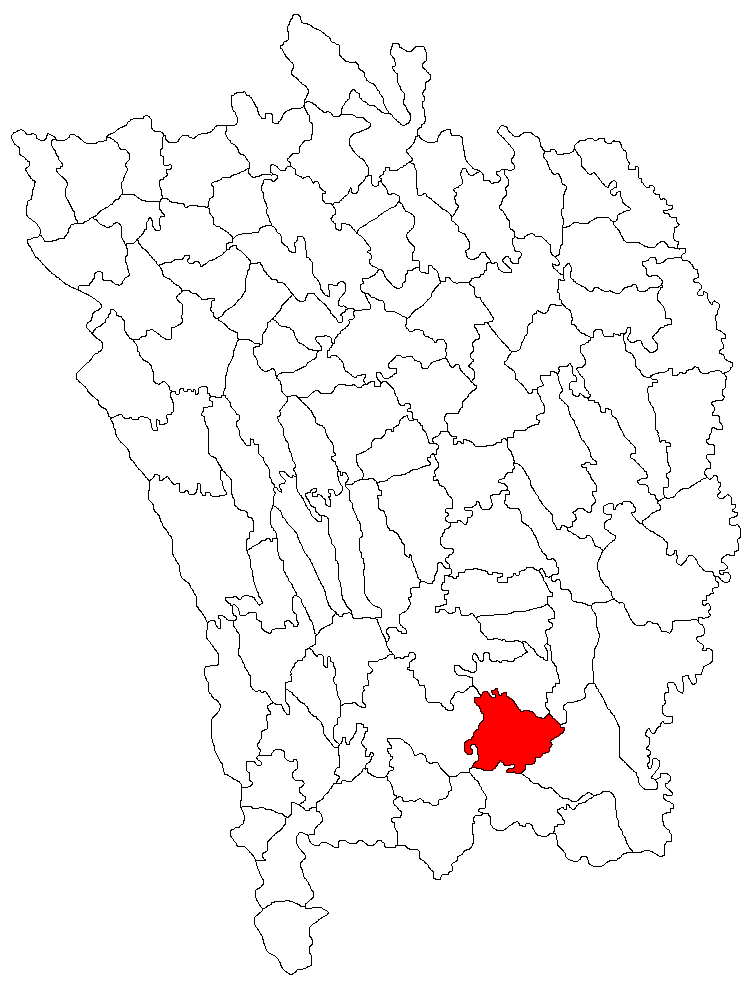
- Location in Vaslui County

- Location in Romania
- Coordinates: 46°15′N 27°54′E
- Country: Romania
- County: Vaslui
- Subdivisions: Bârlălești, Bursuci, Epureni, Horga

Government
  - Mayor (2020–2024): Carmen Bîlbîe (PSD)
- Area: 65.32 km^{2} (25.22 sq mi)
- Population (2021-12-01): 2,542
  - Density: 39/km^{2} (100/sq mi)
- Time zone: EET/EEST (UTC+2/+3)
- Postal code: 737240
- Vehicle reg.: VS

Epureni is a commune in Vaslui County, Western Moldavia, Romania. It is composed of four villages: Bârlălești, Bursuci, Epureni and Horga.
