= Fălciu =

- Commune
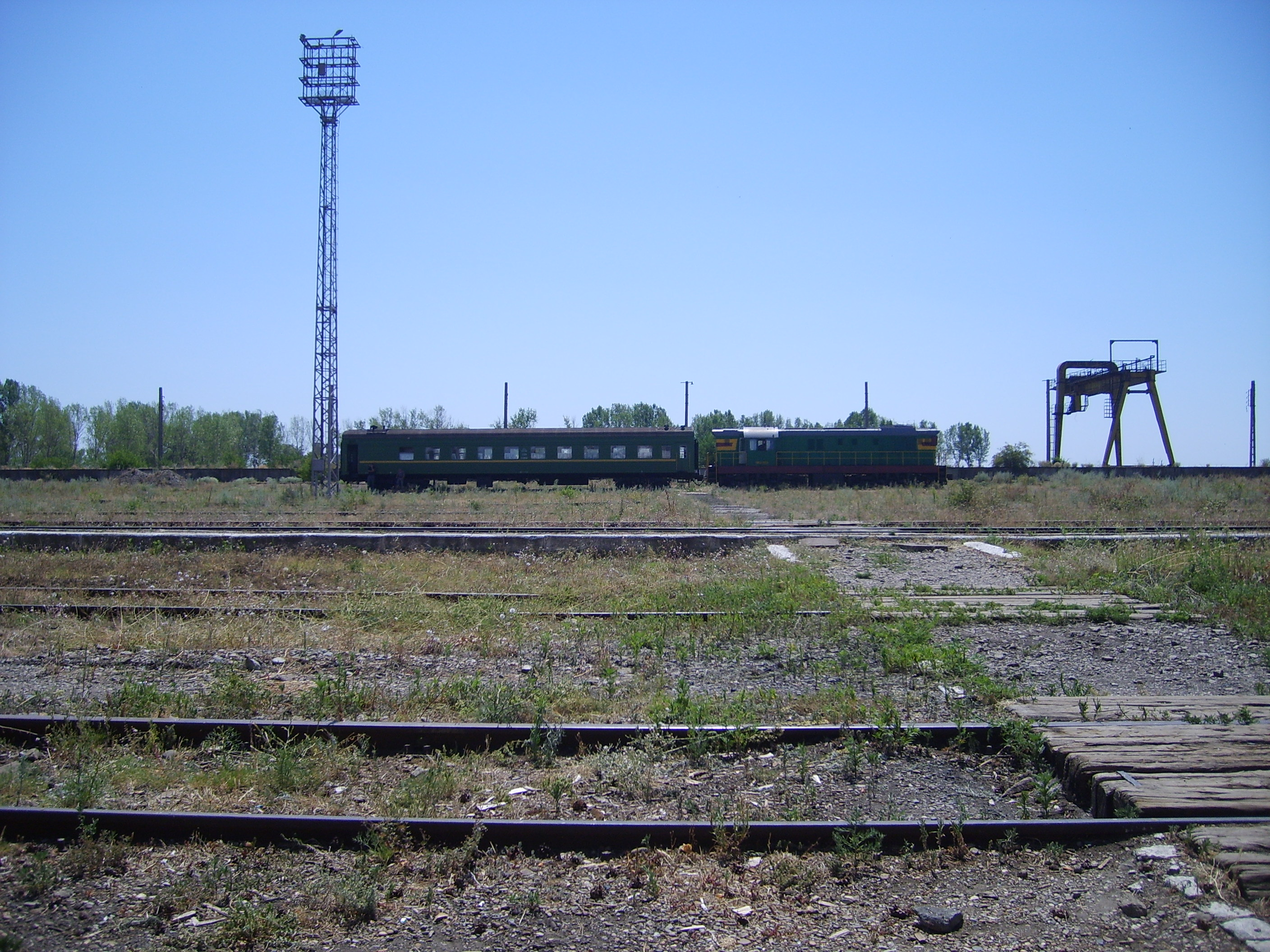
- Train station in Fălciu (2007)

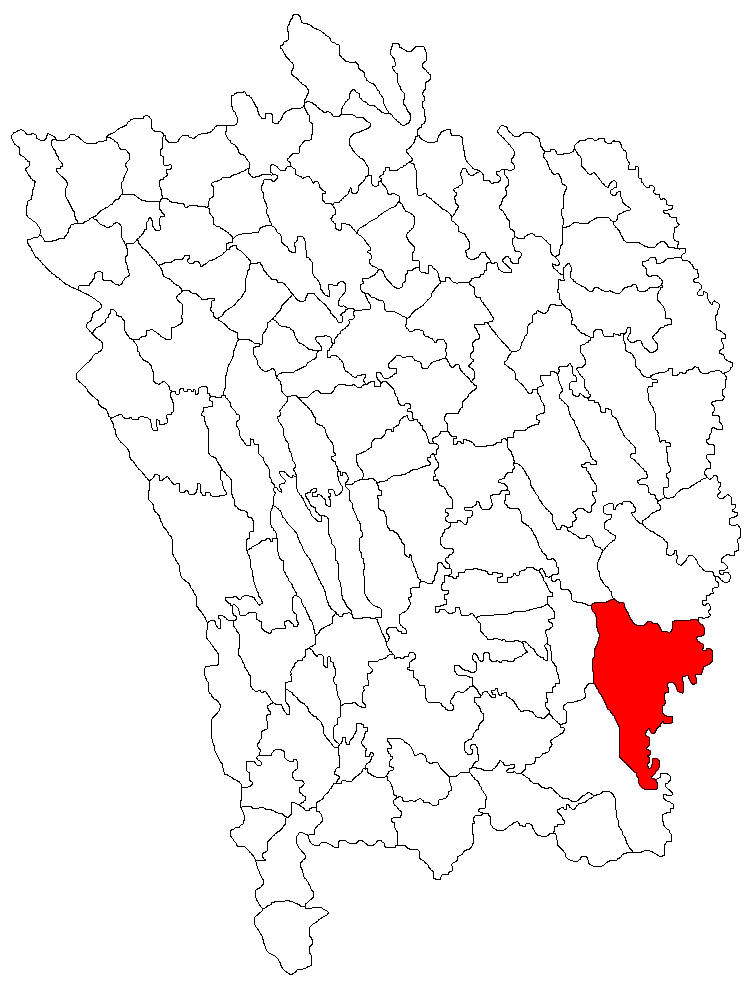
- Location in Vaslui County

- Location in Romania
- Coordinates: 46°17′46″N 28°8′27″E
- Country: Romania
- County: Vaslui
- Subdivisions: Bogdănești, Bozia, Copăceana, Fălciu, Odaia Bogdana, Rânzești

Government
  - Mayor (2020–2024): Neculai Moraru (PSD)
- Area: 148.57 km^{2} (57.36 sq mi)
- Elevation: 26 m (85 ft)
- Population (2021-12-01): 3,731
  - Density: 25.11/km^{2} (65.04/sq mi)
- Time zone: UTC+02:00 (EET)
  - Summer (DST): UTC+03:00 (EEST)
- Postal code: 737245
- Area code: +40x35
- Vehicle reg.: VS
- Website: primariafalciu.ro

Fălciu is a commune in Vaslui County, Western Moldavia, Romania. It is composed of six villages: Bogdănești, Bozia, Copăceana, Fălciu, Odaia Bogdana, and Rânzești.

The commune is a border crossing between Moldova and Romania. The Fălciu Nord train station is the terminus of CFR Rail Line 603, which starts in Bârlad and goes through Murgeni.

At the 2011 census, the commune had 5,103 inhabitants, of which 95.75% were ethnic Romanians. At the 2011 census, Fălciu had a population of 3,731; of those, 84.35% were Romanians.

== Natives ==
- Horațiu Nicolau (1933–2018), volleyball player
