= Vutcani =

- Commune
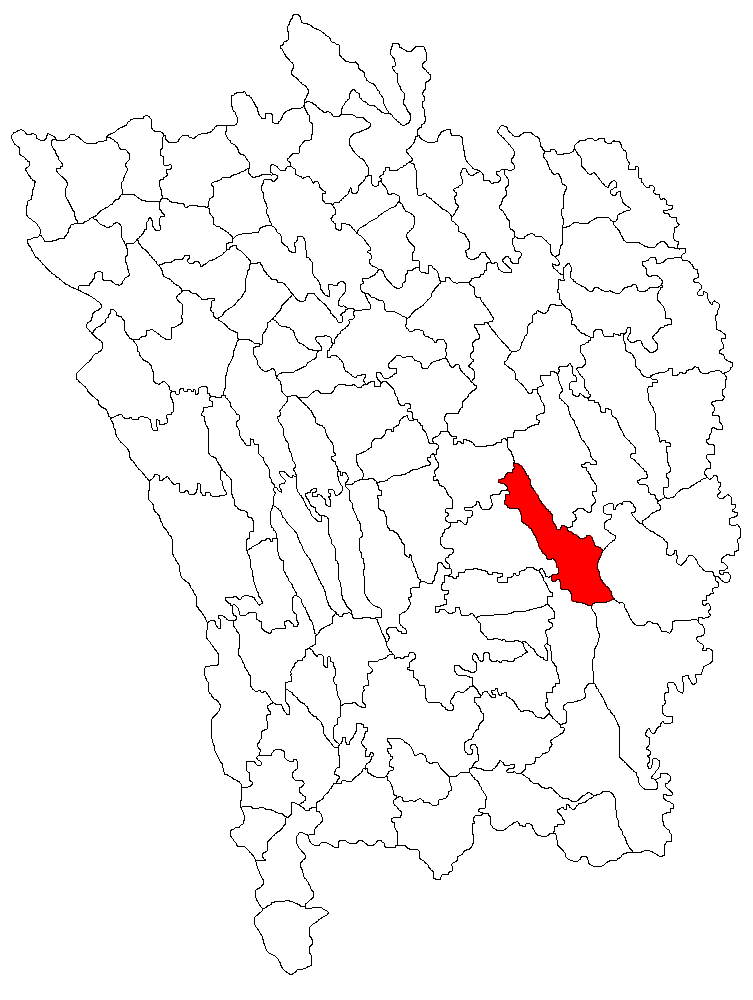
- Location in Vaslui County

- Location in Romania
- Coordinates: 46°28′N 27°58′E
- Country: Romania
- County: Vaslui

Government
  - Mayor (2020–2024): Silviana Bahrim (PSD)
- Population (2021-12-01): 1,527
- Time zone: EET/EEST (UTC+2/+3)
- Vehicle reg.: VS

Vutcani is a commune in Vaslui County, Western Moldavia, Romania. It is composed of three villages: Mălăiești, Poșta Elan and Vutcani.

Notable residents include academic Gheorghe Ivănescu (1912–1987).
