= Dimitrie Cantemir, Vaslui =

Dimitrie Cantemir
- Commune
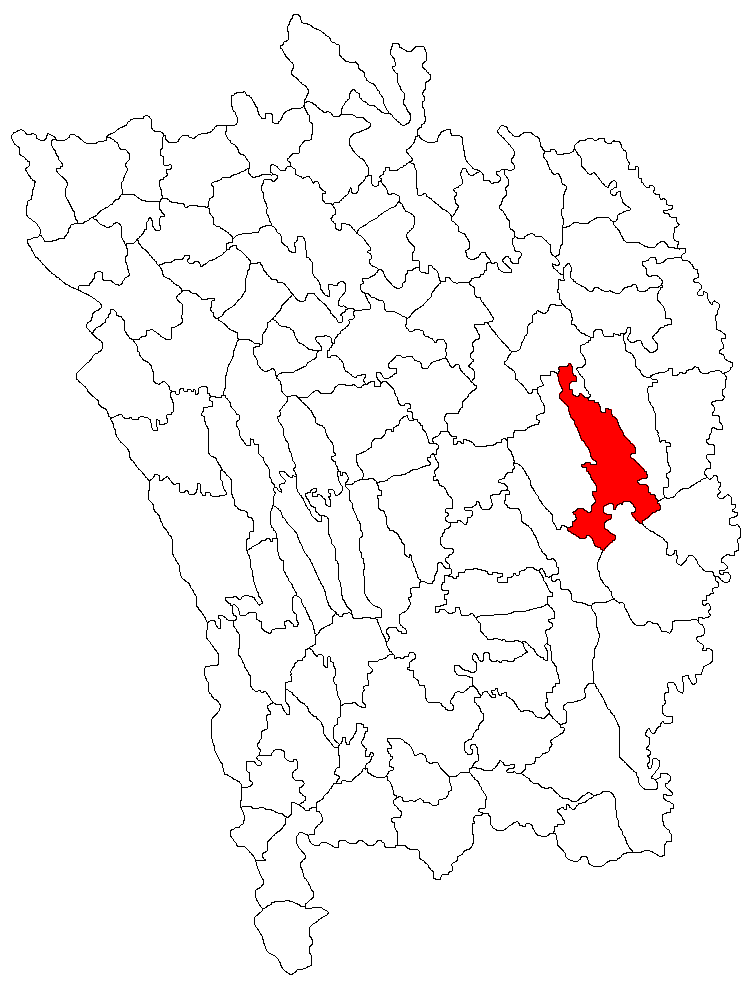
- Location in Vaslui County

- Location in Romania
- Coordinates: 46°30′28″N 28°03′17″E
- Country: Romania
- County: Vaslui
- Subdivisions: Guşiței, Hurdugi, Plotonești, Urlați, Grumezoaia

Government
  - Mayor (2020–2024): Mihai Acsinte (PNL)
- Population (2021-12-01): 2,198
- Time zone: EET/EEST (UTC+2/+3)
- Vehicle reg.: VS

Dimitrie Cantemir (formerly Silișteni) is a commune in Vaslui County, Western Moldavia, Romania. It is composed of five villages: Grumezoaia, Gușiței, Hurdugi (the commune centre), Plotonești and Urlați.

The commune was named for Prince Dimitrie Cantemir, who was born there.
