= Hoceni =

- Commune
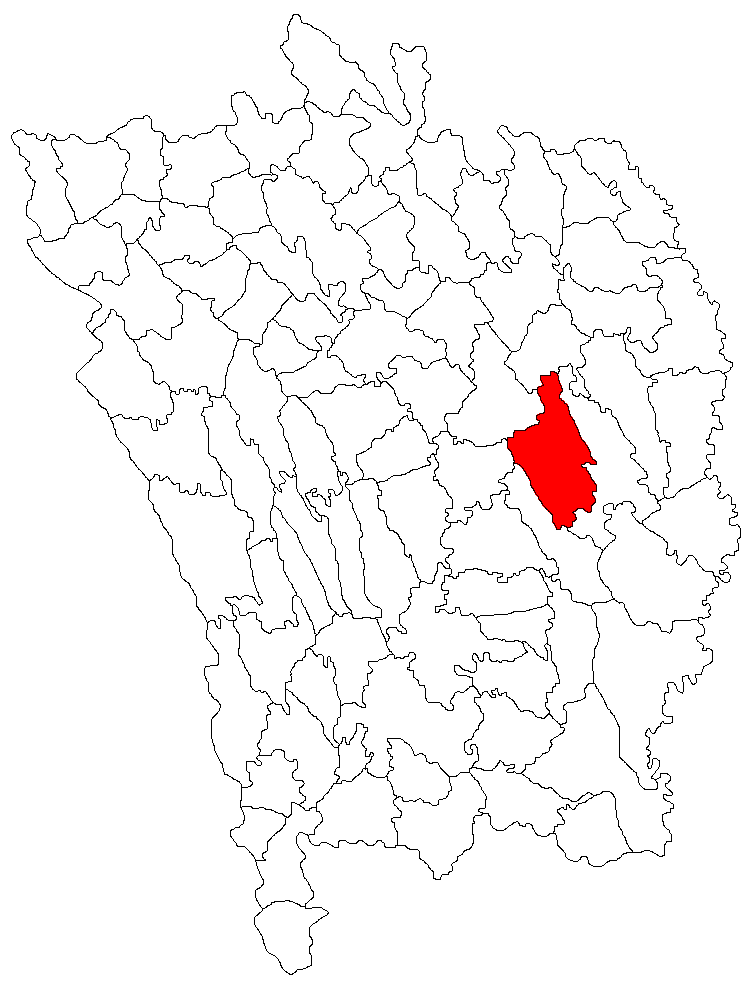
- Location in Vaslui County

- Location in Romania
- Coordinates: 46°32′21″N 28°00′24″E
- Country: Romania
- County: Vaslui
- Subdivisions: Barboși, Deleni, Hoceni, Oțeleni, Rediu, Șișcani, Tomșa

Government
  - Mayor (2020–2024): Vasile Țabără (PSD)
- Population (2021-12-01): 2,237
- Time zone: EET/EEST (UTC+2/+3)
- Vehicle reg.: VS

Hoceni is a commune in Vaslui County, Western Moldavia, Romania. It is composed of seven villages: Barboși, Deleni, Hoceni, Oțeleni, Rediu, Șișcani and Tomșa.
