= List of rivers of Romania: D–F =

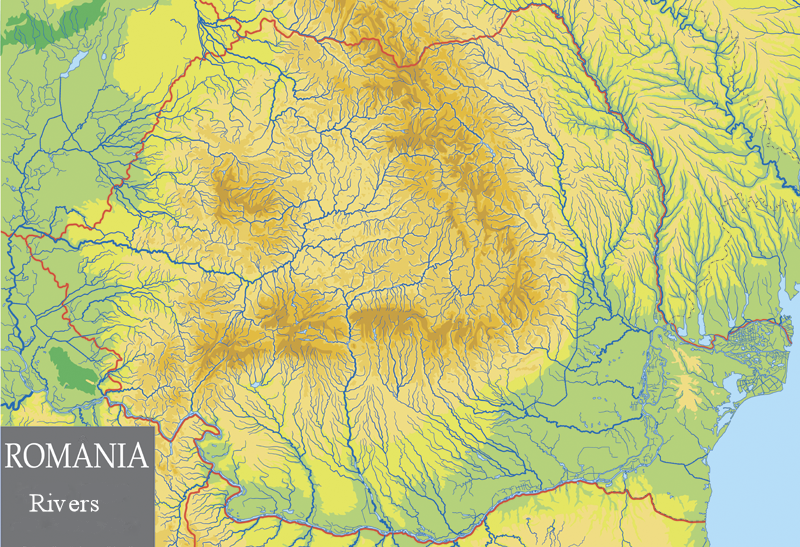
Map of Romania's hydrographic network

== D ==
River	Tributary of
Daia	Homorodul Mare
Daia	Secaș
Dâlga	Oporelu Canal, Olt
Dălghiu	Buzău
Dâlgov	Milcov
Dălhăuți	Milcov
Dalnic	Râul Negru
Dâmbova	Jiu
Dâmbovicioara	Dâmbovița
Dâmbovița	Argeș
Dâmbovnic	Neajlov
Dâmbu	Teleajen
Dămuc	Bicaz
Danube (Dunărea)	Black Sea
Dârjov	Olt
Dârnăul Mare	Bâsca
Dașor	Iad
Debla	Dobrinești
Debren	Olt

River	Tributary of
Dejeasca	Geamăna
Deju	Putna
Deleni	Mureș
Delușor	Bâsca
Derna	Valea Fânețelor
Desnățui	Danube
Dezna	Sebiș
Dijir	Barcău
Dipșa	Șieu
Ditrău	Mureș
Diviciorii Mari	Fizeș
Doamna	Bistrița
Dobârca	Secaș
Dobârlău	Tărlung
Dobra	Mureș
Dobra	Sebeș
Dobric	Lăpuș
Dobricel	Ilișua
Dobrinești	Crișul Repede
Dobrovăț	Vaslui

River	Tributary of
Doftana	Prahova
Doftana	Tărlung
Dofteana	Trotuș
Doftenița	Dofteana
Dognecea	Caraș
Dolina	Sitna
Domald	Târnava Mică
Doman	Bârzava
Domoș	Crișul Repede
Domoșița	Trotuș
Dorna	Bistrița
Dornișoara	Dorna
Dorobanțul	Țibrin
Dorofei	Vedea
Drăculea	Lechința
Drăgan	Crișul Repede
Drăghici	Râul Târgului
Dragomirna	Suceava
Drăgoteni	Valea Roșie
Dragova	Bistrița

River	Tributary of
Dragu	Almaș
Drăguiasa	Vișeu
Drăguș	Olt
Drahura	Neamț
Drajna	Teleajen
Drâslea	Jijia
Dresleuca	Sitna
Drighiu	Valea Mare
Drincea	Danube
Drobotfor	Zeletin
Ducin	Nera
Dudița	Cigher
Dumbrava	Pereschivul Mic
Dumbrăvița	Ilișua
Dumești	Sârbi
Dunărea	Danube
Dunărița	Târnava
Dunavăț	Berheci
Durbav	Ghimbășel
Durușca	Bahlui

== E ==
River	Tributary of
Egher	Batar
Egher	Racta
Egherul Mare	Tur

River	Tributary of
Elan	Prut
Eliseni	Târnava Mare

River	Tributary of
Epureni	Mihona
Eșelnița	Danube

River	Tributary of
Eseniu	Mureș
Estelnic	Râul Negru

== F ==
River	Tributary of
Fădimac	Bega
Falcău	Suceava
Fâncel	Gurghiu
Făncica	Barcău
Fâneața Mare	Barcău
Fâneața Vacilor	Valea Racilor
Fântâna Fătului	Balasan
Fărău	Mureș
Fâstâca	Stemnic
Fața	Timișana

River	Tributary of
Feernic	Târnava Mare
Feiurdeni	Someșul Mic
Feldrișel	Someșul Mare
Felmer	Olt
Feneș	Ampoi
Feneș	Feernic
Feneș	Someșul Mic
Feneș	Timiș
Ferești	Vaslui
Fiad	Sălăuța

River	Tributary of
Finiș	Crișul Negru
Firiza	Săsar
Fișag	Olt
Fișer	Cozd
Fitod	Olt
Fizeș	Bârzava
Fizeș	Someșul Mic
Fleț	Luț
Florei	Doftana
Folea	Lanca Birda

River	Tributary of
Fonău	Valea Nouă
Fornădia	Căian
Frasin	Jijia
Frăsinet	Teslui
Frata	Valea Morii
Frumoasa	Racul
Frumușeaua	Vișeu
Frunziș	Teuz
Fundata	Ialomița
