= Rediu =

Rediu may refer to several places in Romania:

- Rediu, Galați, a commune in Galați County
- Rediu, Iași, a commune in Iași County
- Rediu, Neamț, a commune in Neamţ County
- Rediu, a village in Rădăuți-Prut Commune, Botoșani County
- Rediu, a village in Răuseni Commune, Botoșani County
- Rediu, a village in Aiton Commune, Cluj County
- Rediu, a village in Brăești Commune, Iași County
- Rediu, a village in Ruginoasa Commune, Iași County
- Rediu, a village in Scânteia Commune, Iași County
- Rediu, a village in Bâra Commune, Neamț County
- Rediu, a village in Hoceni Commune, Vaslui County
- Rediu, a village in Roșiești Commune, Vaslui County
- Rediu, a district in the city of Vaslui, Vaslui County
- Rediu Aldei, a village in Aroneanu Commune, Iași County
- Rediu Galian, a village in Codăești Commune, Vaslui County
- Rediu Mitropoliei, a village in Popricani Commune, Iași County
- Rediu (Bahlueț), a tributary of the Bahlueț in Iași County
- Rediu, a tributary of the Bahlui in Iași County
- Rediu (Dobrovăț), a tributary of the Dobrovăț in Vaslui County
- Rediu, a tributary of the Siret in Neamț County
