= Rediu (Dobrovăț) =

- Location within Romania

Location
- Country: Romania
- Counties: Iași, Vaslui
- Villages: Protopopești, Tăcuta, Rediu Galian

Physical characteristics
- Mouth: Dobrovăț
  - location: Codăești
  - coordinates: 46.8719°N 27.7678°E
- Length: 21 km (13 mi)
- Basin size: 85 km^{2} (33 sq mi)

Basin features
- Progression: Dobrovăț→ Vaslui→ Bârlad→ Siret→ Danube→ Black Sea

The Rediu is a right tributary of the river Dobrovăț in Romania. It flows into the Dobrovăț in Codăești. Its length is 21 km (13 mi) and its basin size is 85 km^{2} (33 sq mi). The Rediu and Tăcuta dams are located on this river.
