= Câinel =

Câinel may refer to several places in Romania:

- Căinelu de Jos, a village in Șoimuș Commune, Hunedoara County
- Căinelu de Sus, a village in Băiţa Commune, Hunedoara County
