= Căian =

Căian Kaján-patak
- Location within Romania

Location
- Country: Romania
- Counties: Hunedoara County
- Villages: Hărțăgani, Băița, Fizeș, Chișcădaga, Păuliș

Physical characteristics
- Mouth: Mureș
  - location: Bejan
  - coordinates: 45.9275°N 22.8499°E
- Length: 25 km (16 mi)
- Basin size: 170 km^{2} (66 sq mi)

Basin features
- Progression: Mureș→ Tisza→ Danube→ Black Sea
- Tributaries
  - left: Duba, Stog
  - right: Răcaș, Ormindea, Peștera, Fornădia

The Căian (Hungarian: Kaján-patak) is a right tributary of the river Mureș in Romania. It discharges into the Mureș in Bejan. Its length is 25 km (16 mi) and its basin size is 170 km^{2} (66 sq mi).
