= Siliștea =

Siliștea may refer to several places in Romania:

- Siliștea, Brăila, a commune in Brăila County
- Siliștea, Constanța, a commune in Constanța County
- Siliștea, Teleorman, a commune in Teleorman County
- Siliștea Gumești, a commune in Teleorman County
- Siliștea, a village in Căteasca Commune, Argeș County
- Siliștea, a village in Mileanca Commune, Botoșani County
- Siliștea, a village in Stăuceni Commune, Botoșani County
- Siliștea, a village in Valea Argovei Commune, Călărași County
- Siliștea, a village in Raciu Commune, Dâmbovița County
- Siliștea, a village in Runcu Commune, Dâmbovița County
- Siliștea, a village in Umbrărești Commune, Galați County
- Siliștea, a village in Români Commune, Neamț County
- Siliștea, a village in Tătaru Commune, Prahova County
- Siliștea, a district in the town of Liteni, Suceava County
- Siliștea, a village in Vitănești Commune, Teleorman County
- Siliștea, a village in Iana Commune, Vaslui County
- Siliștea, a village in Pungești Commune, Vaslui County
- Siliștea, a village in Todirești Commune, Vaslui County
- Siliștea Nouă, a district in the town of Dolhasca, Suceava County
- Siliștea (Morișca), a tributary of the Morișca in Botoșani County
- Siliștea (Țibrin), a tributary of the Țibrin in Constanța County
- Siliștea (Valea Porumbenilor), a tributary of the Valea Porumbenilor in Giurgiu County
