= Mircești (disambiguation) =

Mircești may refer to several places:

In Romania:

- Mircești, a commune in Iași County
- Mircești, a village in Tătulești Commune, Olt County
- Mircești, a village in Tăcuta Commune, Vaslui County
- Mirceștii Noi and Mirceștii Vechi, villages in Vânători Commune, Vrancea County
- Mircești, a former village in Ion Corvin Commune, Constanța County

In Moldova:

- Mircești, a village in Boghenii Noi Commune, Ungheni district
