= Țibrin =

- Location within Romania

Location
- Country: Romania
- Counties: Constanța County
- Villages: Nicolae Bălcescu, Dropia, Tortoman, Gherghina, Țibrinu

Physical characteristics
- Mouth: Danube
  - coordinates: 44.3893°N 28.0554°E
- Length: 41 km (25 mi)
- Basin size: 375 km^{2} (145 sq mi)

Basin features
- Progression: Danube→ Black Sea
- Tributaries
  - right: Dorobanțul, Siliștea
- River code: XIV.1.43

The Țibrin is a right tributary of the Danube in Romania. It passes through the artificial Lake Țibrin and flows into the Danube in Seimeni. Its length is 41 km (25 mi) and its basin size is 375 km^{2} (145 sq mi).
