= Ferești (disambiguation) =

Ferești may refer to the following places in Romania:

- Ferești, a commune in Vaslui County
- Ferești, a village in the commune Bucium, Alba County
- Ferești, a village in the commune Giulești, Maramureș County
- Ferești (river), a river in Vaslui County
