= Füzesd =

Füzesd is the Hungarian name for two villages in Romania:

- Fizeş village, Băiţa Commune, Hunedoara County
- Fizeşti village, Pui Commune, Hunedoara County
