= Lunca Mureșului =

Lunca Mureșului Székelykocsárd
- Commune
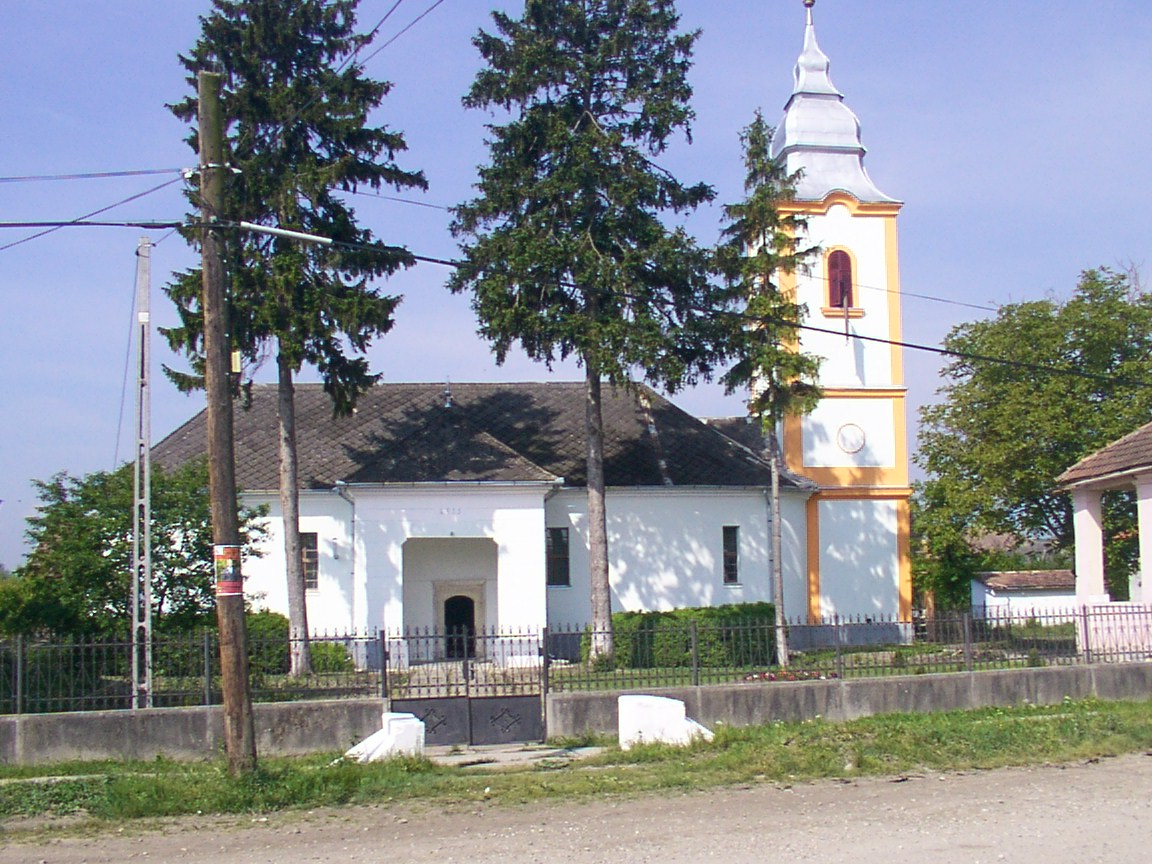
- Reformed church in Lunca Mureșului

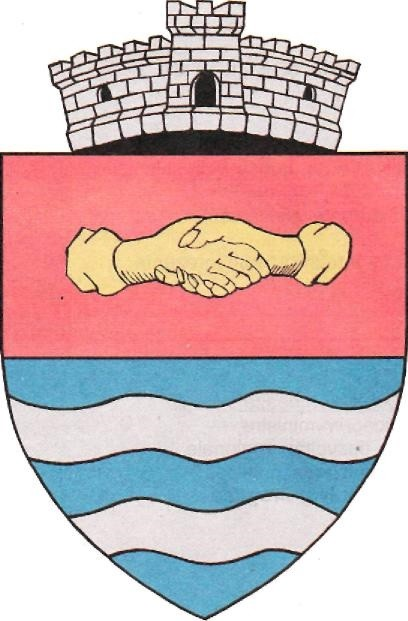
- Coat of arms

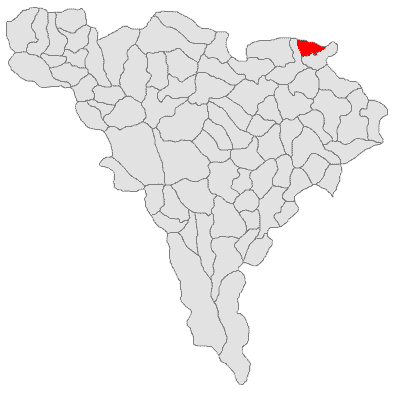
- Location in Alba County

- Location in Romania
- Coordinates: 46°26′N 23°54′E
- Country: Romania
- County: Alba

Government
  - Mayor (2020–2024): Edit-Susana Csegezi (UDMR)
- Area: 31.35 km^{2} (12.10 sq mi)
- Elevation: 291 m (955 ft)
- Population (2021-12-01): 2,297
  - Density: 73.27/km^{2} (189.8/sq mi)
- Time zone: UTC+02:00 (EET)
  - Summer (DST): UTC+03:00 (EEST)
- Postal code: 517405
- Area code: (+40) 02 58
- Vehicle reg.: AB
- Website: lunca-muresului.ro

Lunca Mureșului (Hungarian: Székelykocsárd; German: Holten) is a commune located in the north-east of the Alba County, Transylvania, Romania. It is composed of two villages, Gura Arieșului (Vajdaszeg; Walddorf), and Lunca Mureșului.

== Geography ==
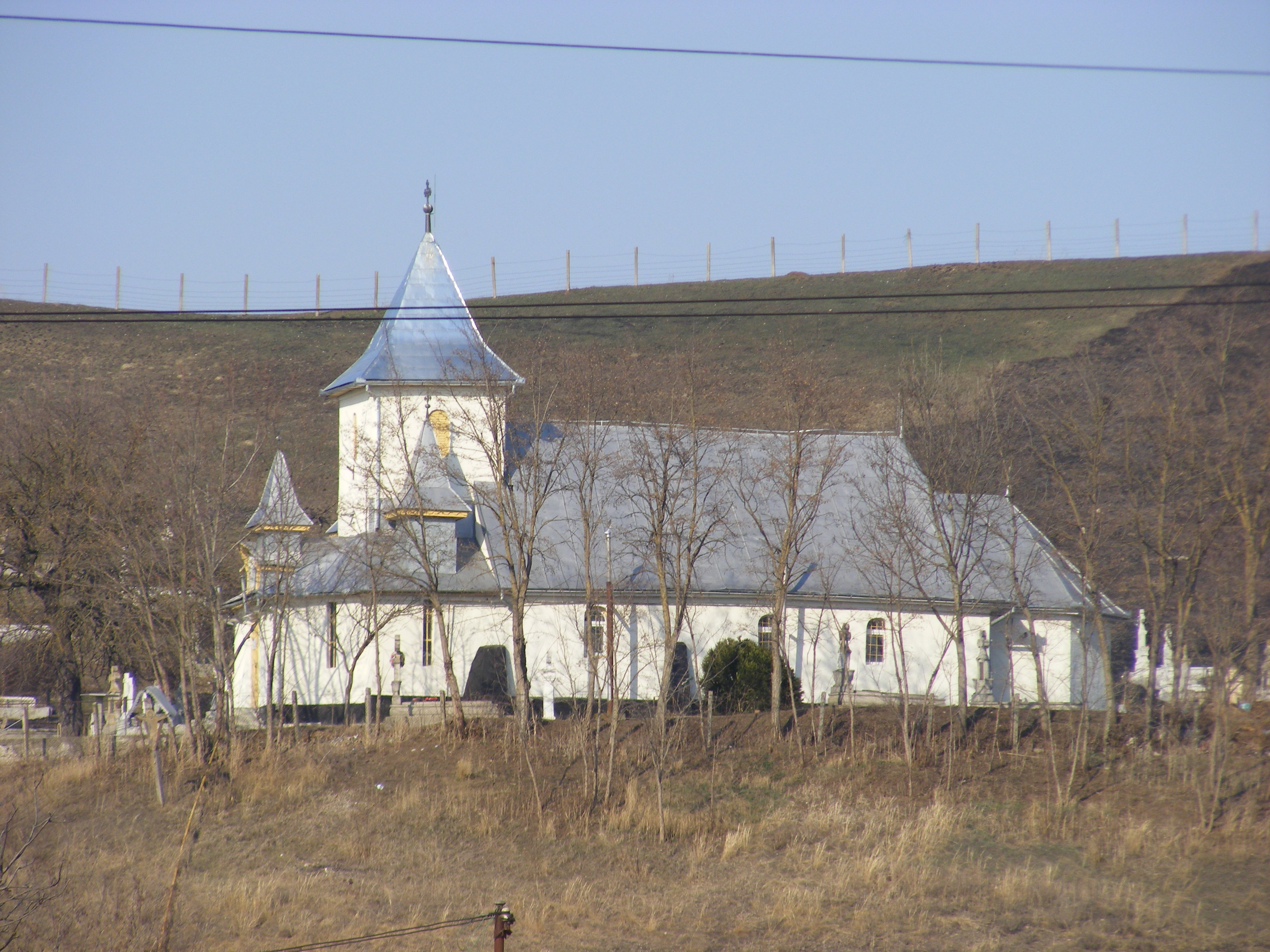
Orthodox church in Gura Arieșului

Lunca Mureșului has an area of 31.35 km^{2} (12.10 sq mi) and is located on the Mureș River, in the north-east corner of Alba County, approximately 10 km (6.2 mi) from the town of Ocna Mureș on the county road DJ107F, 20 km (12 mi) from the towns of Câmpia Turzii and Luduș, and 60 km (37 mi) from the county capital, Alba Iulia.

The commune is bordered by Cluj County in the north, Mureș County in the north-west, the town of Ocna Mureș in the west, and the commune of Noșlac in the south.

The commune is important from a geographical point of view because on its territory (in the village of Gura Arieșului) the river Arieș flows into the Mureș.

== Demographics ==
The 2002 Romanian census recorded 2,669 people living in the commune, of which 1,719 Romanians, 755 Hungarians (most of them in the village of Lunca Mureșului), and 195 Roma. At the 2021 census, there were 2,297 inhabitants, of which 50.41% Romanians, 21.99% Hungarians, and 18.98% Roma.

Historical population
Year	Pop.	±%
1850	1,631	—
1900	2,134	+30.8%
1977	2,821	+32.2%
2002	2,669	−5.4%
2011	2,404	−9.9%
2021	2,297	−4.5%
Source: INS, Census data

== Natives ==
- Sándor Kónya-Hamar (born 1948), politician
