= Fornădia =

- Location within Romania

Location
- Country: Romania
- Counties: Hunedoara County
- Villages: Vălișoara, Săliștioara, Fornădia, Căinelu de Jos

Physical characteristics
- Mouth: Căian
  - location: Bejan
  - coordinates: 45.9378°N 22.8579°E
- Length: 17 km (11 mi)
- Basin size: 42 km^{2} (16 sq mi)

Basin features
- Progression: Căian→ Mureș→ Tisza→ Danube→ Black Sea

The Fornădia is a right tributary of the river Căian in Romania. It flows into the Căian near Bejan. Its length is 17 km (11 mi) and its basin size is 42 km^{2} (16 sq mi).
