= Hăghiac =

Hăghiac may refer to several villages in Romania:

- Hăghiac, a village in Dofteana Commune, Bacău County
- Hăghiac, a village in Răchitoasa Commune, Bacău County
