= Fărău =

Fărău Magyarforró
- Commune
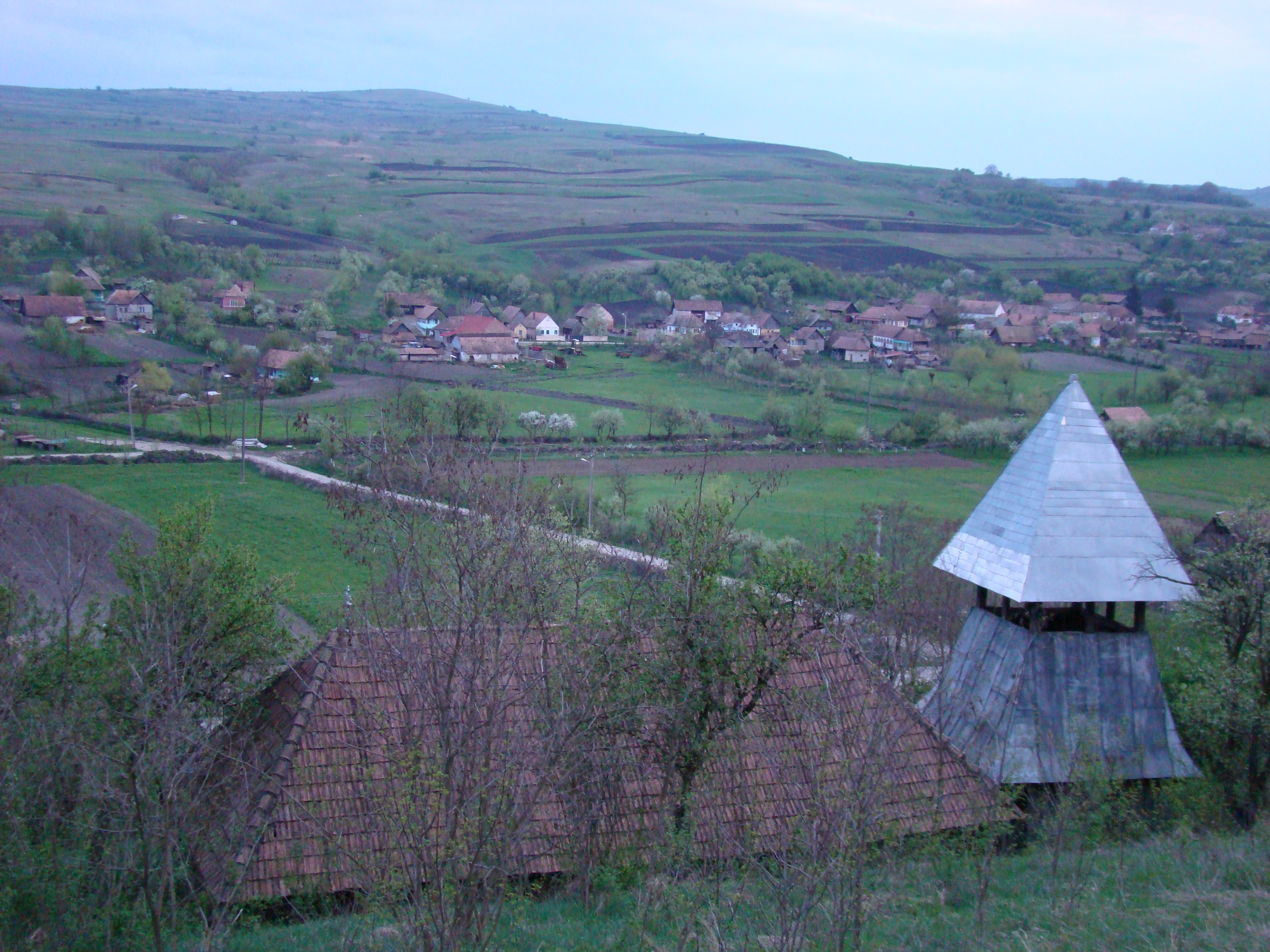
- View of Șilea

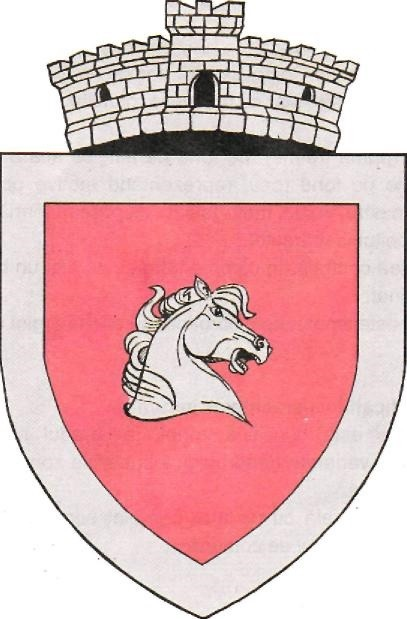
- Coat of arms

- Location in Alba County

- Location in Romania
- Coordinates: 46°20′29″N 24°00′21″E
- Country: Romania
- County: Alba

Government
  - Mayor (2024–2028): Ioan Stoia (PNL)
- Area: 81.48 km^{2} (31.46 sq mi)
- Elevation: 404 m (1,325 ft)
- Population (2021-12-01): 1,303
  - Density: 15.99/km^{2} (41.42/sq mi)
- Time zone: UTC+02:00 (EET)
  - Summer (DST): UTC+03:00 (EEST)
- Postal code: 517280
- Area code: (+40) 02 58
- Vehicle reg.: AB
- Website: www.primariafarau.ro

Fărău (German: Brenndorf; Hungarian: Magyarforró) is a commune located in northeastern part of Alba County, Transylvania, Romania. It is composed of five villages: Fărău, Heria (Hari), Medveș (Nagymedvés), Sânbenedic (Magyarszentbenedek) and Șilea (Magyarsülye).

The commune is situated on the Transylvanian Plateau, on the border with Mureș County, at a distance of 58 km (36 mi) from the county seat, Alba Iulia. It lies at the divide between the Mureș River and Târnava Mică River valleys. The Fărău river, a left tributary of the Mureș, flows through the commune.

Fărău borders to the east and northeast Bichiș commune, to the southeast Jidvei commune, to the south and southwest Șona commune, to the west Hopârta commune, and to the north and northwest Noșlac commune.

According to the census from 2011 there was a total population of 1,569 people living in this commune, of which 69.66% were ethnic Romanians, 22.18% ethnic Hungarians, and 4.4% ethnic Romani. At the 2021 census, Fărău had a population of 1,303, of which 78.59% were Romanians and 11.59% Hungarians.

There are several wooden churches in the commune, including:

- The Holy Archangels Michael and Gabriel Church in Fărău village, built in 1762.
- The Saint Nicholas Church in Sânbenedic village, built in the 18th century.
- The Holy Archangels Church in Sânbenedic village, built in 1775.
- The Saint Nicholas Church in Șilea village, built in the 18th century.

Historical population
Year	Pop.	±%
1750	516	—
1766	531	+2.9%
1831	1,016	+91.3%
1854	1,019	+0.3%
1854	1,019	+0.0%
1857	930	−8.7%
1900	1,119	+20.3%
1910	1,124	+0.4%
1920	1,075	−4.4%
1930	1,239	+15.3%
2002	1,909	+54.1%
2011	1,569	−17.8%
2021	1,303	−17.0%
Source: Census data
