= Silivaș =

Silivaş may refer to several villages in Romania:

- Silivaş, a village in Hopârta Commune, Alba County
- Silivaş, a village in the town of Gherla, Cluj County
