= Ciunget =

- Location within Romania

Location
- Country: Romania
- Counties: Bacău County

Physical characteristics
- Mouth: Dofteana
  - coordinates: 46.2590°N 26.4425°E
- Length: 10 km (6.2 mi)
- Basin size: 23 km^{2} (8.9 sq mi)

Basin features
- Progression: Dofteana→ Trotuș→ Siret→ Danube→ Black Sea

The Ciunget (also: Argintărie) is a left tributary of the river Dofteana in Romania. Its source is in the Nemira Mountains. Its length is 10 km (6.2 mi) and its basin size is 23 km^{2} (8.9 sq mi).
