= Dobrovăț (river) =

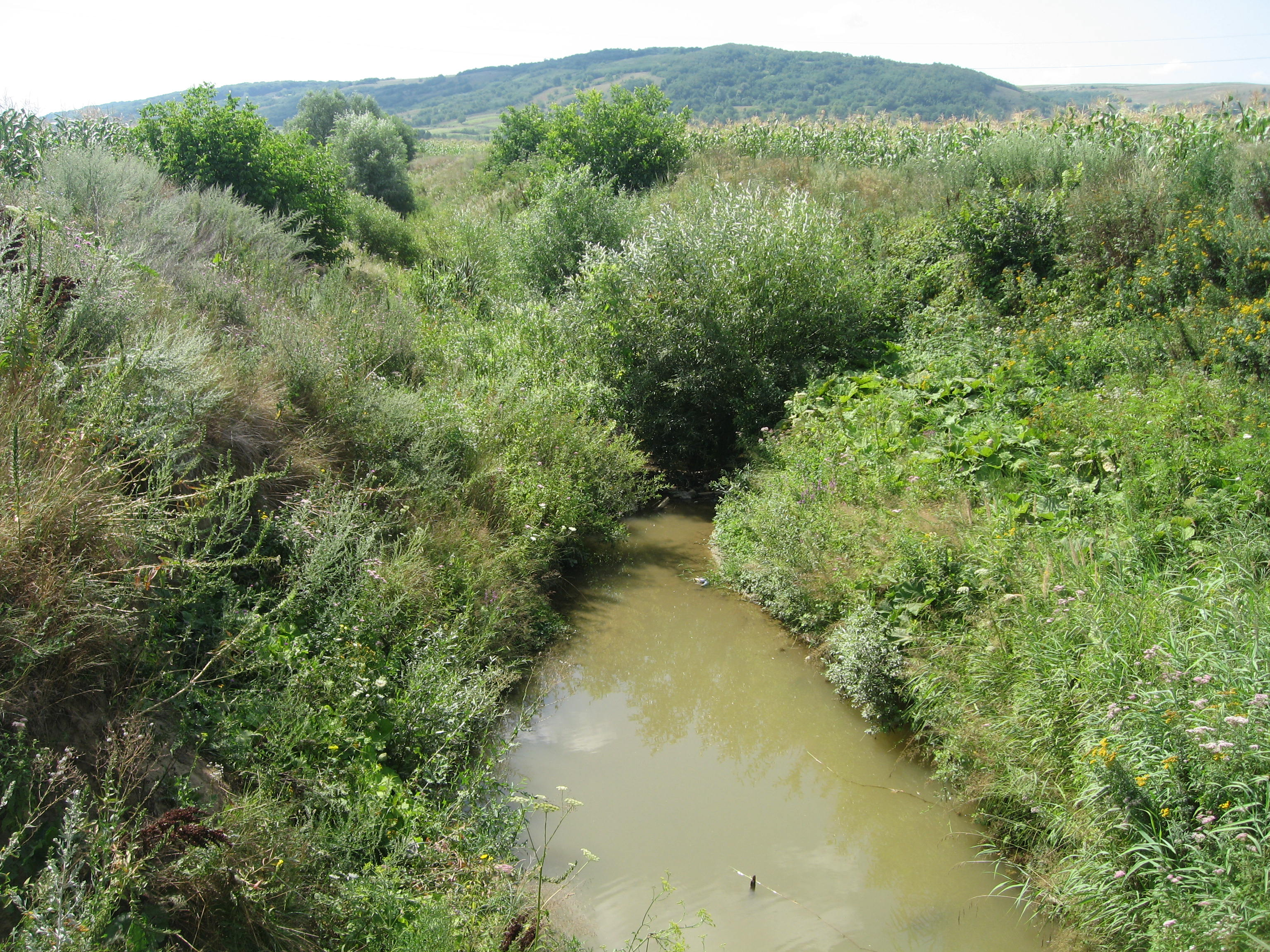

- Location within Romania

Location
- Country: Romania
- Counties: Iași, Vaslui
- Villages: Slobozia, Dobrovăț, Codăești

Physical characteristics
- Mouth: Vaslui
  - location: Codăești
  - coordinates: 46.8527°N 27.7925°E
- Length: 27 km (17 mi)
- Basin size: 185 km^{2} (71 sq mi)

Basin features
- Progression: Vaslui→ Bârlad→ Siret→ Danube→ Black Sea
- Tributaries
  - left: Poiana Lungă, Pietrosu
  - right: Rediu
- River code: XII.1.78.16.5

The Dobrovăț is a right tributary of the river Vaslui in Romania. It flows into the Vaslui near Codăești. Its length is 27 km (17 mi) and its basin size is 185 km^{2} (71 sq mi).
