= Siliștea (Țibrin) =

- Location within Romania

Location
- Country: Romania
- Counties: Constanța County
- Villages: Siliștea

Physical characteristics
- Mouth: Țibrin
  - coordinates: 44.3817°N 28.0616°E
- Length: 21 km (13 mi)
- Basin size: 116 km^{2} (45 sq mi)

Basin features
- Progression: Țibrin→ Danube→ Black Sea
- River code: XIV.1.43.2

The Siliștea is a right tributary of the river Țibrin in Romania. It passes through the artificial Lake Domneasca and flows into the Danube near Seimeni. Its length is 21 km (13 mi) and its basin size is 116 km^{2} (45 sq mi).
