= Dorobanțul =

- Location within Romania

Location
- Country: Romania
- Counties: Constanța County
- Villages: Dorobanțu, Tortoman

Physical characteristics
- Mouth: Țibrin
  - coordinates: 44.3406°N 28.2160°E
- Length: 17 km (11 mi)
- Basin size: 71 km^{2} (27 sq mi)

Basin features
- Progression: Țibrin→ Danube→ Black Sea
- River code: XIV.1.43.1

The Dorobanțul is a right tributary of the river Țibrin in Romania. It flows into the Țibrin in Tortoman. Its length is 17 km (11 mi) and its basin size is 71 km^{2} (27 sq mi).
