= Doftenița =

- Location within Romania

Location
- Country: Romania
- Counties: Bacău County

Physical characteristics
- Mouth: Dofteana
  - coordinates: 46.3179°N 26.5256°E
- Length: 8 km (5.0 mi)
- Basin size: 24 km^{2} (9.3 sq mi)

Basin features
- Progression: Dofteana→ Trotuș→ Siret→ Danube→ Black Sea

The Doftenița is a left tributary of the river Dofteana in Romania. It flows into the Dofteana in the village Dofteana. Its length is 8 km (5.0 mi) and its basin size is 24 km^{2} (9.3 sq mi).
