= Ferești (river) =

- Location within Romania

Location
- Country: Romania
- Counties: Vaslui County
- Villages: Dănești, Ferești

Physical characteristics
- Mouth: Vaslui
  - coordinates: 46.7092°N 27.7603°E
- Length: 14 km (8.7 mi)
- Basin size: 69 km^{2} (27 sq mi)

Basin features
- Progression: Vaslui→ Bârlad→ Siret→ Danube→ Black Sea
- Tributaries
  - right: Sărata

The Ferești is a right tributary of the river Vaslui in Romania. It flows into the Vaslui in Moara Domnească. Its length is 14 km (8.7 mi) and its basin size is 69 km^{2} (27 sq mi).
