= Vaslui (river) =

Vaslui Vasluieț
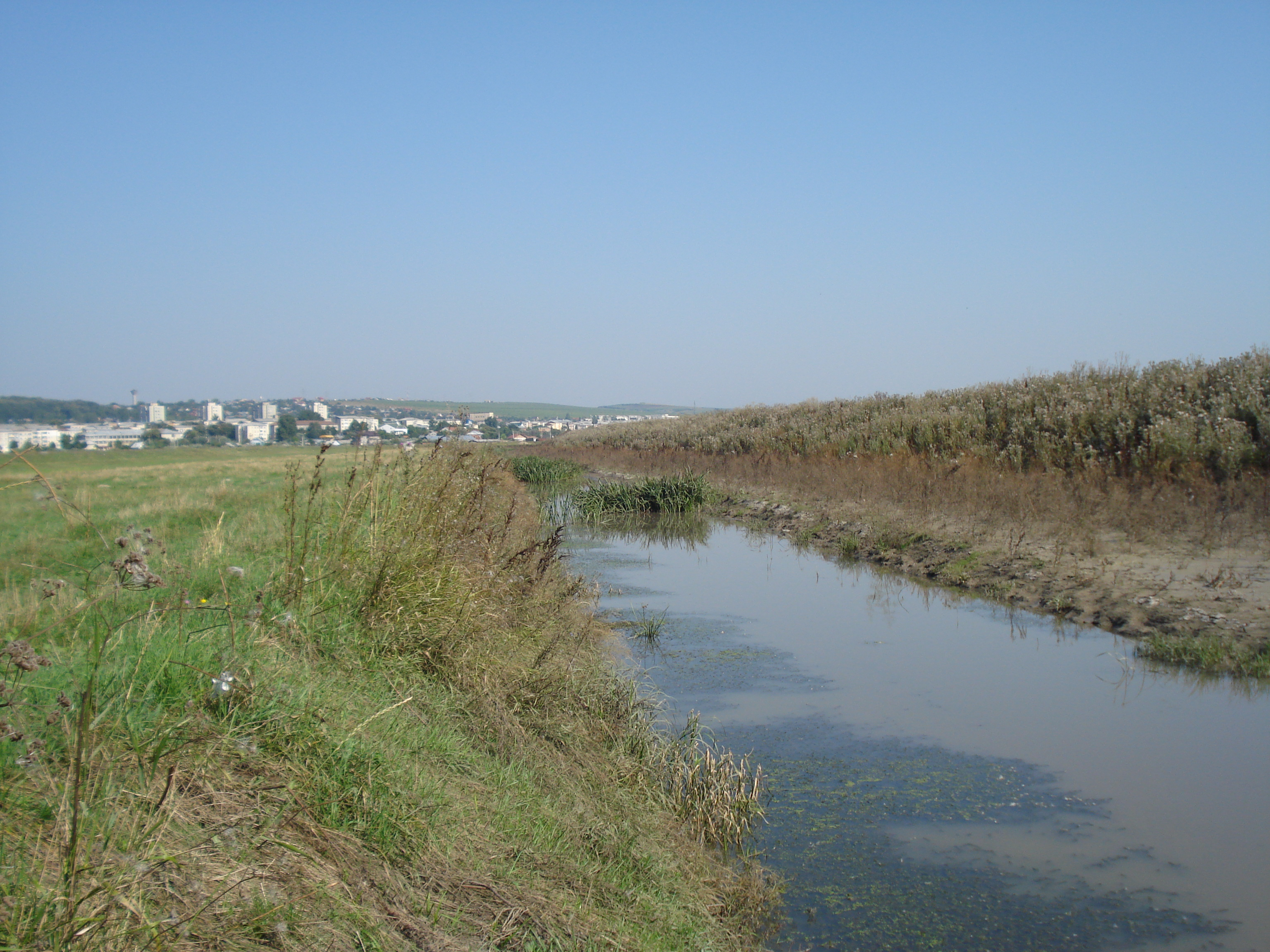

- Location within Romania

Location
- Country: Romania
- Counties: Iași, Vaslui

Physical characteristics
- Mouth: Bârlad
  - location: Vaslui
  - coordinates: 46.5288°N 27.8081°E
- Length: 81 km (50 mi)
- Basin size: 692 km^{2} (267 sq mi)
- Discharge
  - location: *
  - average: 1.1 m^{3}/s (39 cu ft/s)

Basin features
- Progression: Bârlad→ Siret→ Danube→ Black Sea

The Vaslui is a left tributary of the river Bârlad in Romania. It discharges into the Bârlad south of the city of Vaslui. Its length is 81 km (50 mi) and its basin size is 692 km^{2} (267 sq mi). The Solești Dam is located on this river.

== Towns and villages ==
The following towns and villages are situated along the river Vaslui, from source to mouth: Schitu Duca, Coropceni, Ciortești, Solești, Văleni, Vaslui and Muntenii de Jos.

== Tributaries ==
The following rivers are tributaries to the Vaslui (from source to mouth):

- Left: Coropceni, Ciortești, Rac (Chircești)
- Right: Cărbunăria, Tabăra, Pocreaca, Dobrovăț, Lunca, Glod, Ferești, Munteni, Delea
