= Suhurlui =

- Commune
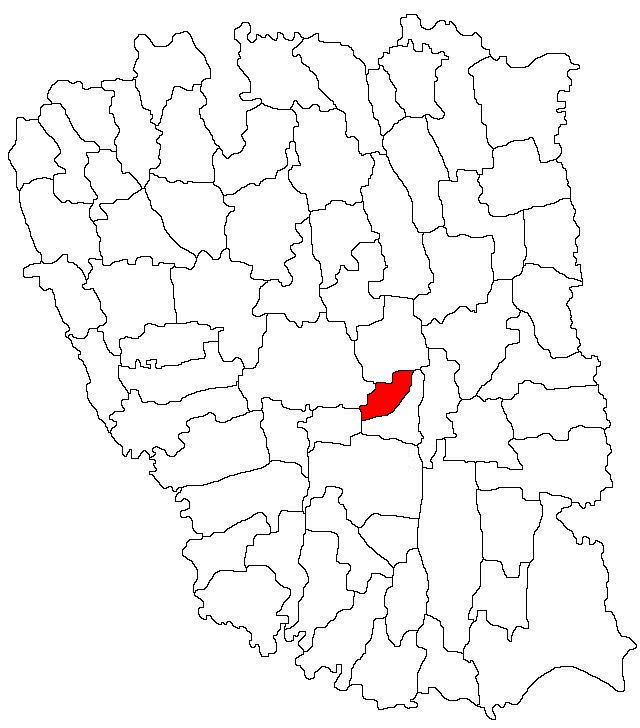
- Location in Galați County

- Location in Romania
- Coordinates: 45°43′N 27°50′E
- Country: Romania
- County: Galați

Government
  - Mayor (2020–2024): Gigi Țuțu (PNL)
- Elevation: 64 m (210 ft)
- Population (2021-12-01): 1,131
- Time zone: UTC+02:00 (EET)
  - Summer (DST): UTC+03:00 (EEST)
- Postal code: 807257
- Vehicle reg.: GL
- Website: comunasuhurlui.ro

Suhurlui is a commune in Galați County, Western Moldavia, Romania. Established in 2008 when it was split off from Rediu Commune, it is composed of a single village, Suhurlui.

The commune is located in the central part of the county, 30 km (19 mi) from the border with Ukraine and 42 km (26 mi) from the county seat, Galați.
