= Hopârta =

- Commune
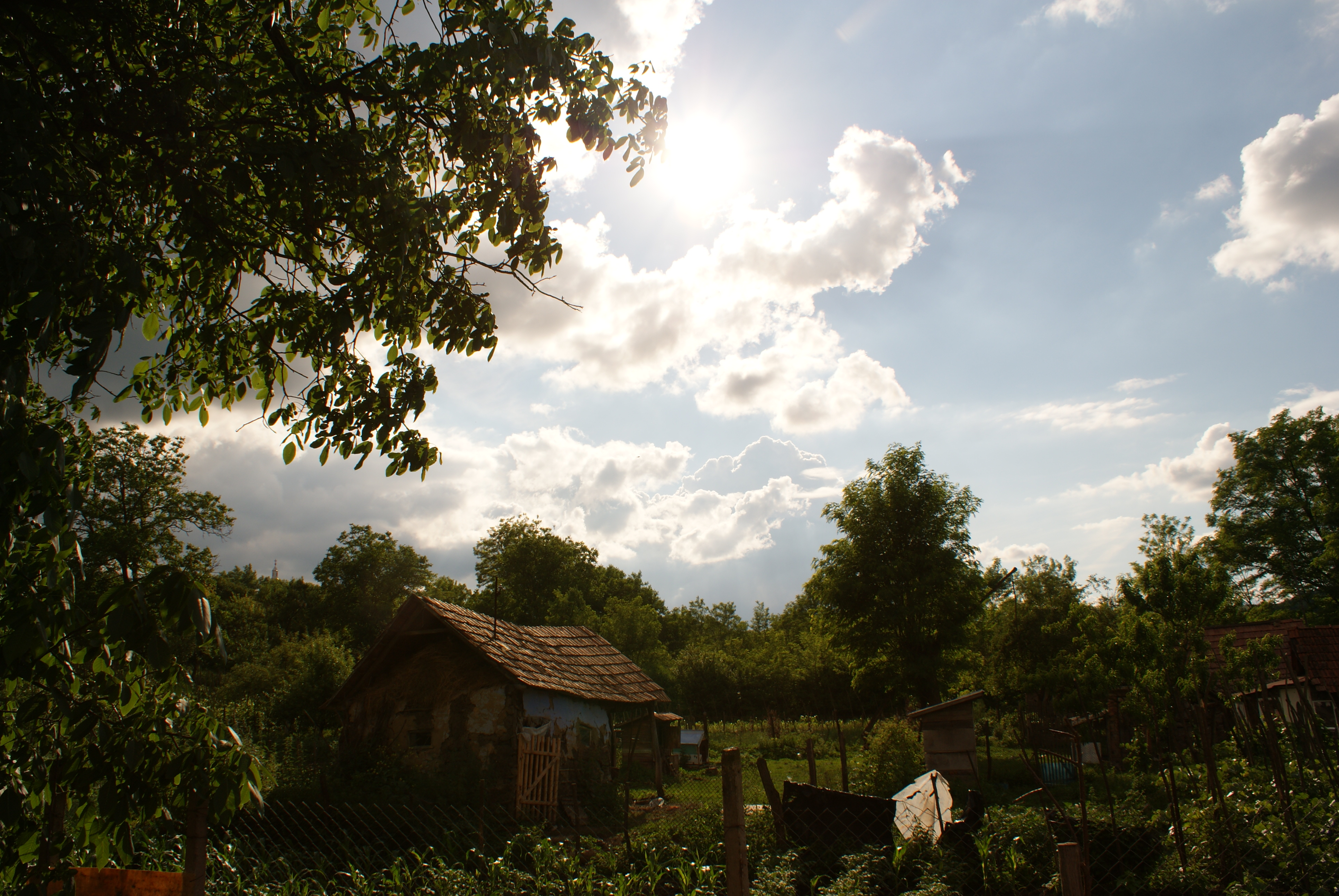
- View of Hopârta

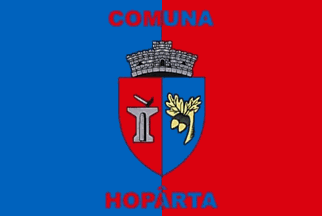
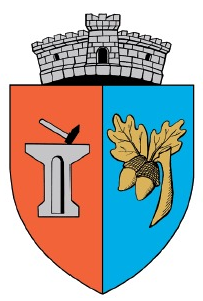
- Flag Coat of arms

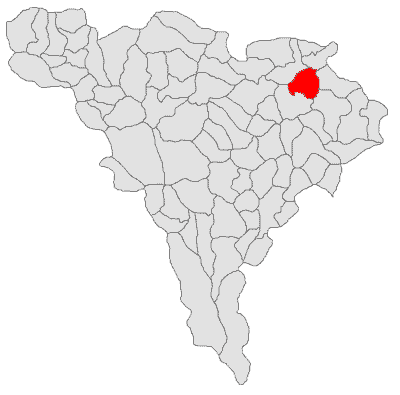
- Location in Alba County

- Location in Romania
- Coordinates: 46°19′15″N 23°52′14″E
- Country: Romania
- County: Alba

Government
  - Mayor (2020–2024): Augustin Popa (PNL)
- Area: 61.48 km^{2} (23.74 sq mi)
- Elevation: 375 m (1,230 ft)
- Population (2021-12-01): 1,128
  - Density: 18.35/km^{2} (47.52/sq mi)
- Time zone: UTC+02:00 (EET)
  - Summer (DST): UTC+03:00 (EEST)
- Postal code: 517335
- Vehicle reg.: AB
- Website: www.primariahopirta.ro

Hopârta (German: Meerport; Hungarian: Háporton) is a commune located in Alba County, Transylvania, Romania. It has a population of 1,128 as of 2021. It is composed of five villages: Hopârta, Silivaș (Mikószilvás), Șpălnaca (Ispánlaka), Turdaș (Oláhtordos), and Vama Seacă (Szárazvámtanya).

== Geography ==
The commune is situated on the Transylvanian Plateau, in the northeastern corner of the county. The river Fărău flows north through Vama Seacă, discharging into the Mureș near Noșlac.

Hopârta has the following neighbors: the town of Ocna Mureș to the west and northwest, Noșlac commune to the northeast, Fărău and Șona communes to the east, and Lopadea Nouă commune to the south and southeast. It is traversed by county road DJ107E, which connects the city of Aiud, 16 kilometres (10 mi) to the west, to Vama Seacă, and then on via DJ107D, to Ocna Mureș. is traversed by county road DJ107E, which connects the city of Aiud, 16 kilometres (10 mi) to the west, to Vama Seacă, and then on via DJ107D, to Ocna Mureș.

== Dacian bracelets from Șpălnaca ==
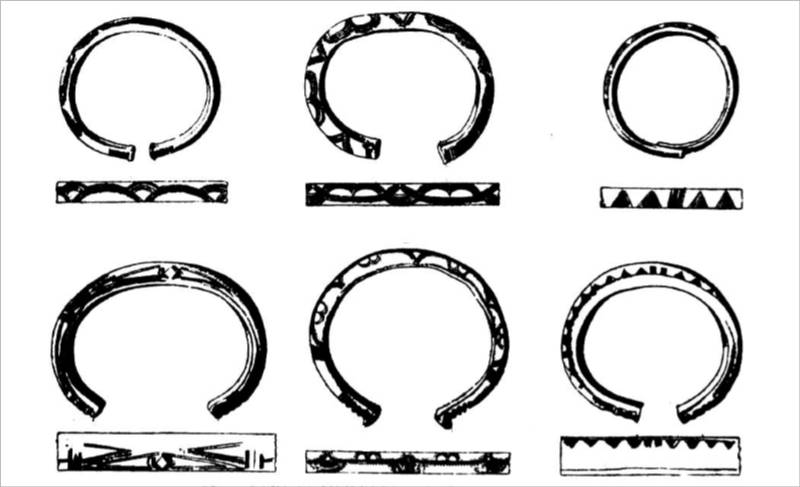
Șpălnaca Dacian bracelets

A trove of Dacian bracelets dating from the Bronze Age IV and Iron Age I (10th–9th centuries BC) have been discovered at Șpălnaca. The bracelets have decorations of geometric characters of chiseled or engraved lines.

== Natives ==
- Ioan Andone (born 1960), footballer
- Virgil Gligor (1918–1977), veterinarian, corresponding member of the Romanian Academy

Historical population
Year	Pop.	±%
1850	2,541	—
1900	3,205	+26.1%
1956	3,564	+11.2%
1992	1,558	−56.3%
2002	1,372	−11.9%
2011	1,152	−16.0%
2021	1,128	−2.1%
Source: INS, Census data
