= Debren (river) =

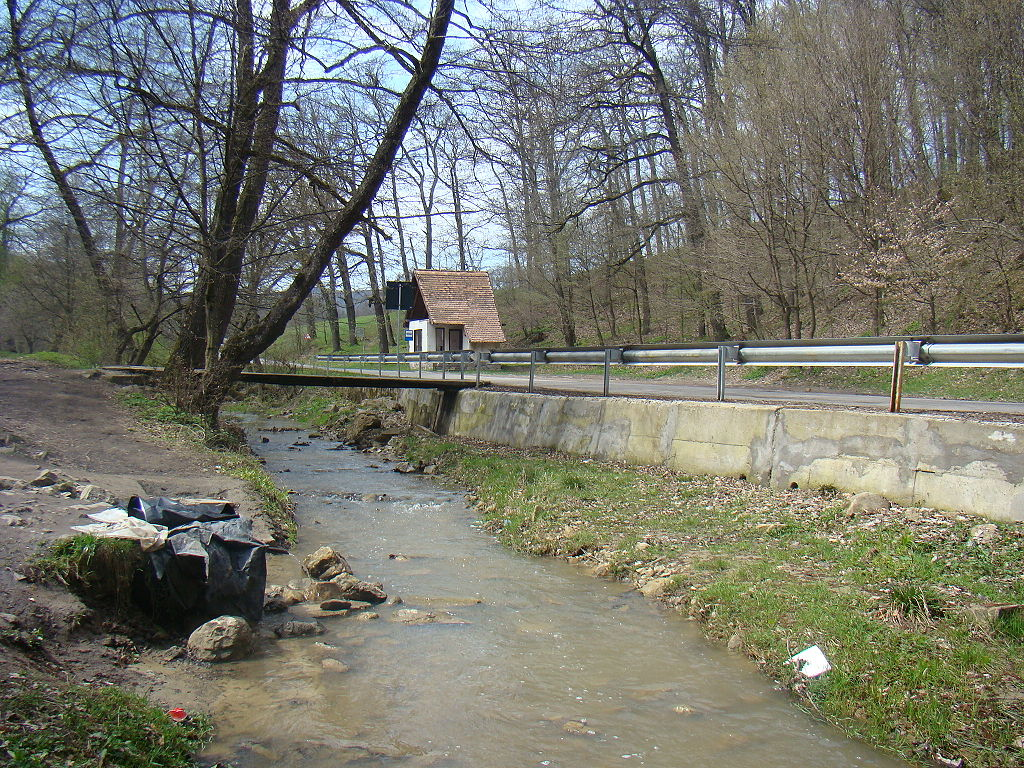
- The river Debren in the Șugaș Băi Resort, downstream of the Honvéd Spring

- Location within Romania

Location
- Country: Romania
- Counties: Covasna County
- Cities: Sfântu Gheorghe

Physical characteristics
- Mouth: Olt
  - location: Sfântu Gheorghe
  - coordinates: 45.8664°N 25.8032°E
- Length: 10 km (6.2 mi)
- Basin size: 18 km^{2} (6.9 sq mi)

Basin features
- Progression: Olt→ Danube→ Black Sea

The Debren is a right tributary of the river Olt in Romania. It flows into the Olt in the city Sfântu Gheorghe. Its length is 10 km (6.2 mi) and its basin size is 18 km^{2} (6.9 sq mi).
