= Fărău (river) =

Fărău Forró-patak
- Location within Romania

Location
- Country: Romania
- Counties: Alba County
- Villages: Șilea, Fărău, Vama Seacă

Physical characteristics
- Mouth: Mureș
  - location: Downstream of Noșlac
  - coordinates: 46.4041°N 23.8989°E
- Length: 29 km (18 mi)
- Basin size: 163 km^{2} (63 sq mi)

Basin features
- Progression: Mureș→ Tisza→ Danube→ Black Sea
- Tributaries
  - left: Alecuș, Turdaș, Silivaș

The Fărău (Hungarian: Forró-patak) is a left tributary of the river Mureș in Transylvania, Romania. It discharges into the Mureș near Noșlac. Its length is 29 km (18 mi) and its basin size is 163 km^{2} (63 sq mi). Its name means "Hot Creek" in Hungarian.
