= Băița, Hunedoara =

Băița
- Commune
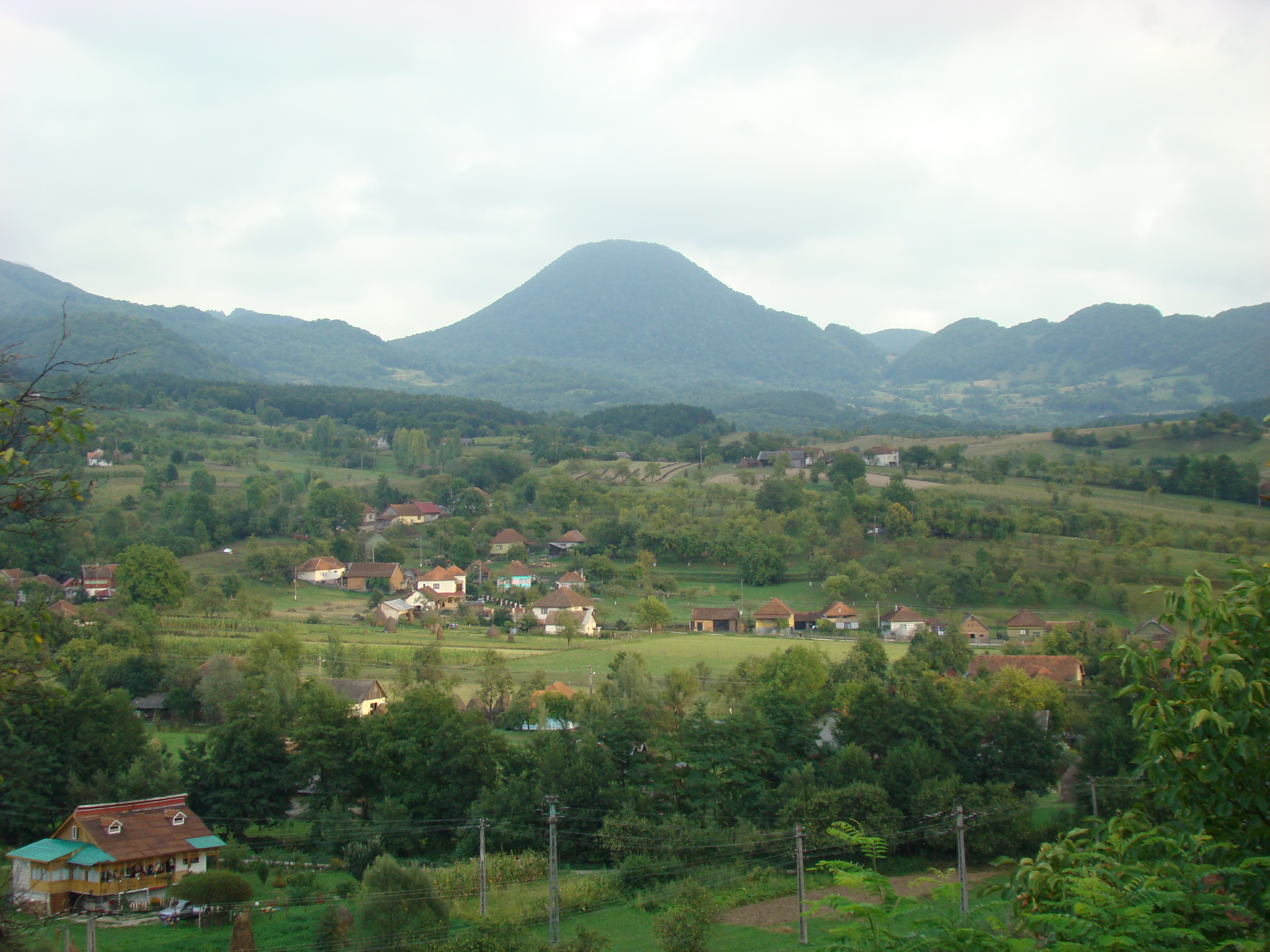
- View of Hărțăgani

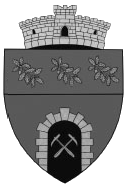
- Coat of arms

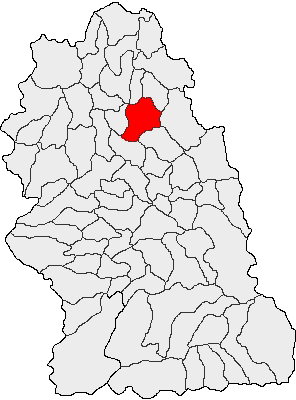
- Location in Hunedoara County

- Location in Romania
- Coordinates: 46.030°N 22.892°E
- Country: Romania
- County: Hunedoara
- Area: 111.4 km^{2} (43.0 sq mi)
- Highest elevation: 390 m (1,280 ft)
- Lowest elevation: 289 m (948 ft)
- Population (2021-12-01): 3,113
  - Density: 27.94/km^{2} (72.38/sq mi)
- Time zone: UTC+02:00 (EET)
  - Summer (DST): UTC+03:00 (EEST)
- Postal code: 337045
- Area code: (+40) 02 54
- Vehicle reg.: HD
- Website: baita.ro

Băița (Hungarian: Boica, German: Pernseifen) is a commune in Hunedoara County, Transylvania, Romania. It is composed of eleven villages: Barbura (Bárbura), Băița, Căinelu de Sus (Felsőkajanel), Crăciunești (Krecsunesd), Fizeș (Füzesd), Hărțăgani (Hercegány), Lunca (Nyavajásfalva), Ormindea (Ormingya), Peștera (Pestyere), Săliște (Szelistye), and Trestia (Tresztia).

The commune is situated in the northern part of the county, at the foot of the Metaliferi Mountains. It is dominated by the Setraș Peak, with an altitude of 1,084 m (3,556 ft), and other hay-like peaks which provide evidence of volcanic eruptions in the area.

Băița is located at a distance of 24 km (15 mi) from Deva and 21 km (13 mi) from Brad. It borders the following communes: Crișcior and Bucureșci to the north, Balșa and Certeju de Sus to the east, Șoimuș to the south, and Vălișoara to the west. It is crossed by county road DJ706A, which runs from Șoimuș to Vălișoara.

For about 20 years, the Ormindea train station served the Căile Ferate Române Line 209, which connected Brad to Deva. Construction of the rail line started in April 1939. During World War II, Jews and Soviet prisoners of war worked on the project; up to a 1,000 are said to have died due to the harsh conditions there. The project was restarted in 1960, with a 301 m (988 ft) rail bridge over the river Mureș, and was completed in the mid-1980s.

At the 2021 census, the commune had a population of 3,113, of which 89.08% were Romanians.

Historical population
Year	Pop.	±%
1850	6,278	—
1900	9,432	+50.2%
1941	7,822	−17.1%
1992	4,720	−39.7%
2002	4,218	−10.6%
2011	3,712	−12.0%
2021	3,113	−16.1%
Source: Census data
