= Felmer =

Felmer Șoarș
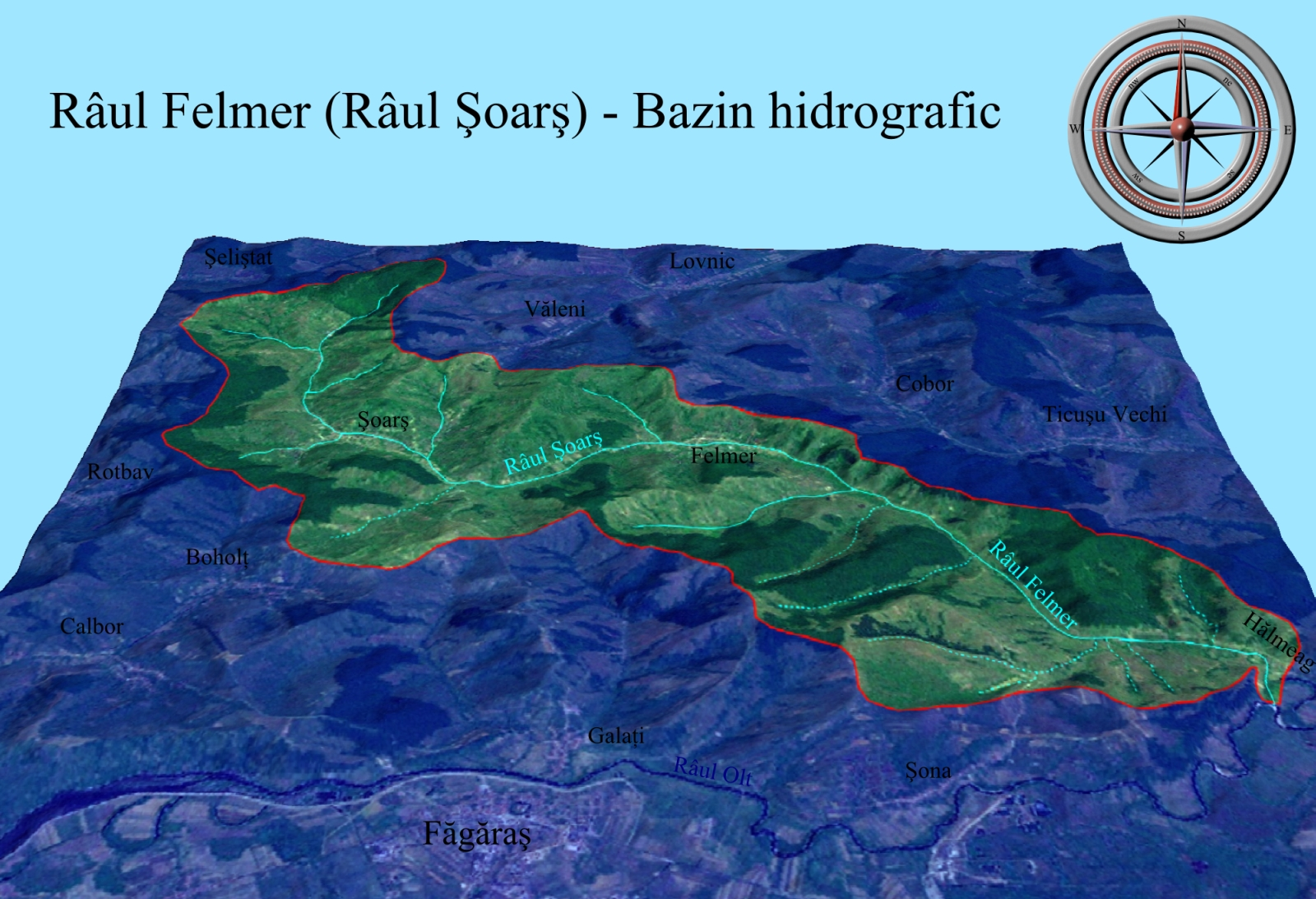

- Location within Romania

Location
- Country: Romania
- Counties: Brașov County
- Villages: Șoarș, Felmer

Physical characteristics
- Mouth: Olt
  - location: Hălmeag
  - coordinates: 45.8646°N 25.1059°E
- Length: 26 km (16 mi)
- Basin size: 103 km^{2} (40 sq mi)

Basin features
- Progression: Olt→ Danube→ Black Sea

The Felmer or Șoarș is a right tributary of the river Olt in Romania. It discharges into the Olt in Hălmeag. Its length is 26 km (16 mi) and its basin size is 103 km^{2} (40 sq mi).
