= Eseniu =

Eseniu Eszenyő-patak
- Location within Romania

Location
- Country: Romania
- Counties: Harghita County
- Villages: Sineu

Physical characteristics
- Source: Gurghiu Mountains
- Mouth: Mureș
  - location: Remetea
  - coordinates: 46.811°N 25.461°E
- Length: 17 km (11 mi)
- Basin size: 28 km^{2} (11 sq mi)

Basin features
- Progression: Mureș→ Tisza→ Danube→ Black Sea

The Eseniu (Hungarian: Eszenyő-patak) is a small river in the Gurghiu Mountains, Harghita County, central Romania. It is a left tributary of the river Mureș. It flows through the village Sineu (municipality Remetea), and joins the Mureș in the village Remetea. Its length is 17 km (11 mi) and its basin size is 28 km^{2} (11 sq mi).
