= Boghenii Noi =

- Commune
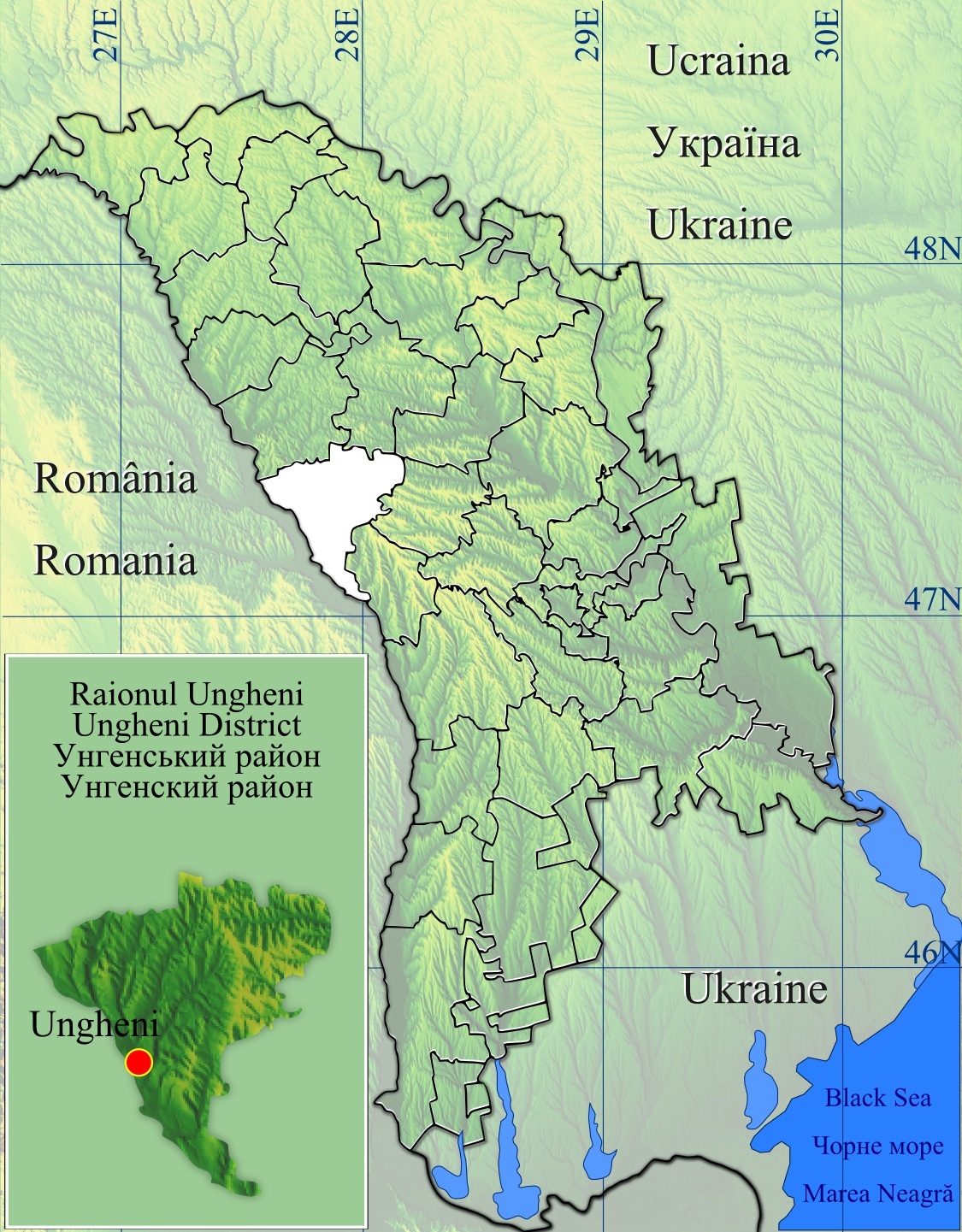
- Location within Ungheni
- Coordinates: 47°25′30″N 28°0′45″E
- Country: Moldova

Government
  - Mayor: Gheorghe Filipovici

Population (2014)
  - Total: 1,447
- Time zone: UTC+2 (EET)
  - Summer (DST): UTC+3 (EEST)
- Postal code: MD-3613

Boghenii Noi is a commune in Ungheni District, Moldova. It is composed of five villages: Boghenii Noi, Boghenii Vechi, Izvoreni, Mircești and Poiana.
