= Fitod =

- Location within Romania

Location
- Country: Romania
- Counties: Harghita County
- Villages: Hosasău, Fitod

Physical characteristics
- Mouth: Olt
  - location: Jigodin-Băi
  - coordinates: 46.3376°N 25.8030°E
- Length: 13 km (8.1 mi)
- Basin size: 40 km^{2} (15 sq mi)

Basin features
- Progression: Olt→ Danube→ Black Sea
- Tributaries
  - left: Valea Fânețelor

The Fitod is a left tributary of the river Olt in Romania. It flows into the Olt in Jigodin-Băi. The Șuta Dam is built on this river. Its length is 13 km (8.1 mi) and its basin size 40 km^{2} (15 sq mi).
