= Rediu, Galați =

Rediu
- Commune
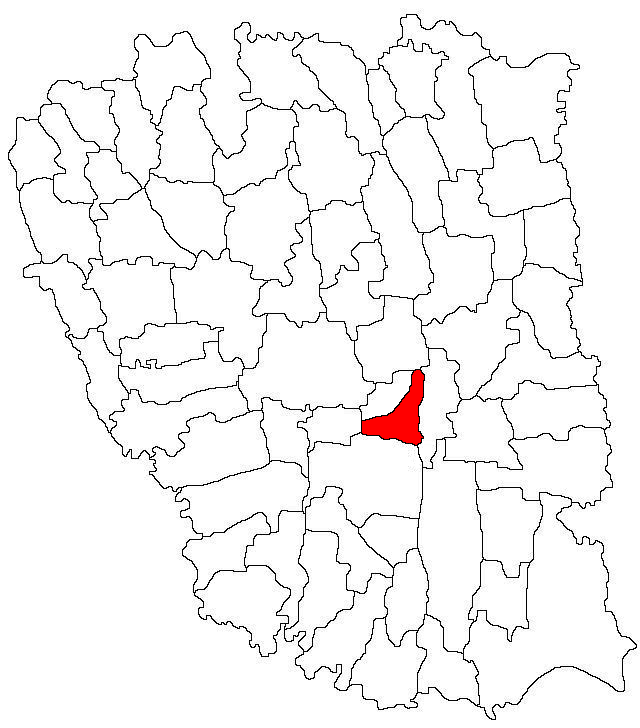
- Location in Galați County

- Location in Romania
- Coordinates: 45.6474°N 27.9011°E
- Country: Romania
- County: Galați
- Population (2021-12-01): 1,610
- Time zone: UTC+02:00 (EET)
  - Summer (DST): UTC+03:00 (EEST)
- Vehicle reg.: GL

Rediu is a commune in Galați County, Western Moldavia, Romania with a population of 3,909 people at the 2002 census. It is composed of two villages: Plevna and Rediu. Suhurlui village broke off as a separate commune in 2008.
