= Mircea Vodă, Constanța =

Mircea Vodă
- Commune
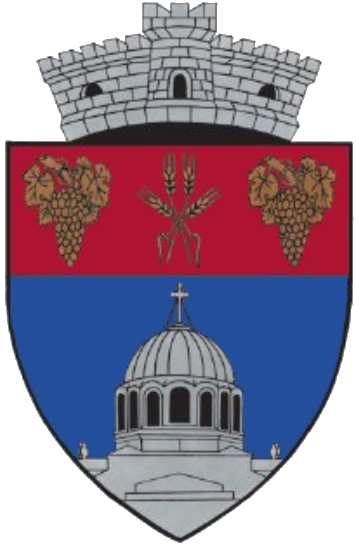
- Coat of arms

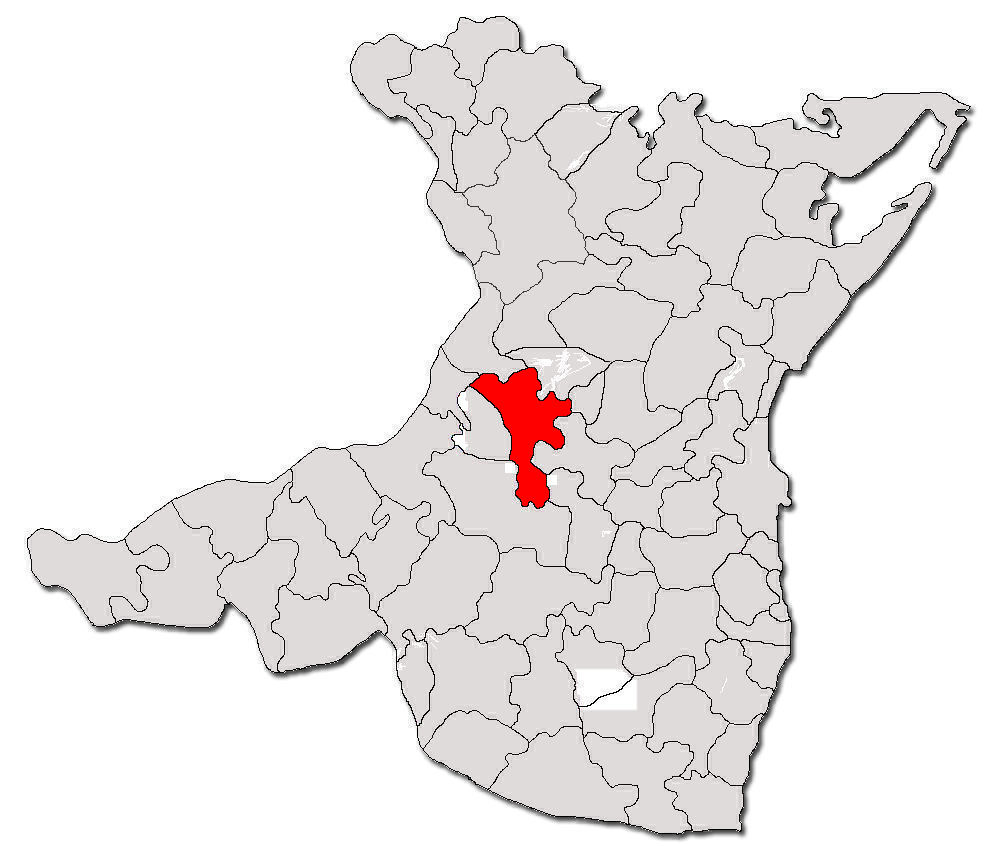
- Location in Constanța County

- Location in Romania
- Coordinates: 44°16′39″N 28°10′18″E
- Country: Romania
- County: Constanța
- Subdivisions: Mircea Vodă, Gherghina, Satu Nou, Țibrinu

Government
  - Mayor (2020–2024): George Ionașcu (PSD)
- Area: 70.89 km^{2} (27.37 sq mi)
- Elevation: 30 m (98 ft)
- Population (2021-12-01): 4,907
  - Density: 69.22/km^{2} (179.3/sq mi)
- Time zone: UTC+02:00 (EET)
  - Summer (DST): UTC+03:00 (EEST)
- Postal code: 907195
- Area code: +40 x41
- Vehicle reg.: CT
- Website: www.primaria-mirceavoda.ro

Mircea Vodă (Romanian pronunciation: [ˈmirt͡ʃe̯a ˈvodə]) is a commune in Constanța County, Northern Dobruja, Romania. It is located in the central part of the county, along the Danube–Black Sea Canal.

== Demographics ==
At the 2011 census, Mircea Vodă had a population of 4,886; of those, 4,727 were Romanians (99.24%), 28 Roma (0.59%), 6 Turks (0.13%), and 2 others (0.04%). At the 2021 census, there were 4,907 inhabitants, of which 90.46% were Romanians and 1.75% Roma.

== History ==
Settlement in the area dates back at least to the time of the Roman Empire. In a place that the local Turks called "Acşandemir Tabiasi", a 10th-century castrum was found, which has a stone vallum. A Slavic inscription found in this place mentions a certain "Jupan Dimitrie" and the year 943.

== Villages ==
The following villages belong to the commune:

- Mircea Vodă (historical name: Celebichioi or Celibichioi, Turkish: Çelebiköy) - named after Mircea I of Wallachia
- Gherghina (historical name: Defcea, Turkish: Devce)
- Satu Nou (historical name: Enichioi, Turkish: Yeniköy)
- Țibrinu (historical name: Ceabacu)

== Image gallery ==
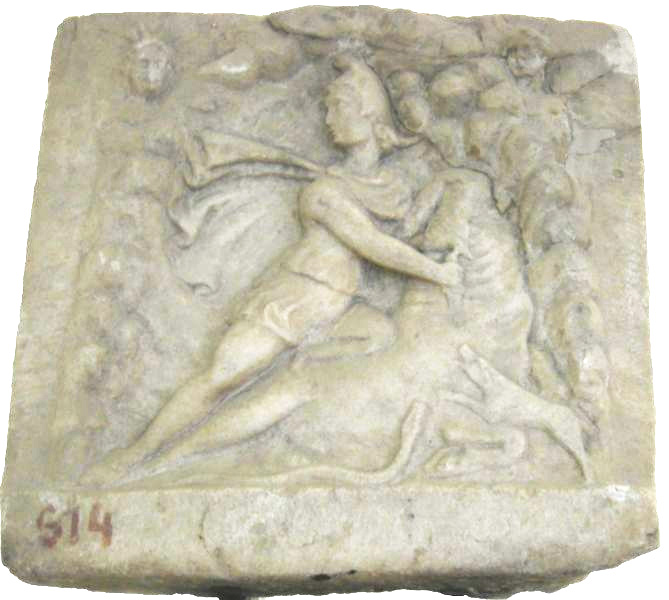
Mithraic relief from Mircea Vodă, 2nd century CE - Museum of Romanian History, Bucharest
