= Dofteana (river) =

- Location within Romania

Location
- Country: Romania
- Counties: Bacău County
- Villages: Dofteana

Physical characteristics
- Mouth: Trotuș
  - location: Dofteana
  - coordinates: 46.3281°N 26.5398°E
- Length: 26 km (16 mi)
- Basin size: 110 km^{2} (42 sq mi)

Basin features
- Progression: Trotuș→ Siret→ Danube→ Black Sea
- Tributaries
  - left: Ciunget, Doftenița

The Dofteana is a right tributary of the river Trotuș in Romania. It discharges into the Trotuș in the village Dofteana. Its length is 26 km (16 mi) and its basin size is 110 km^{2} (42 sq mi).
