= Tortoman =

- Commune
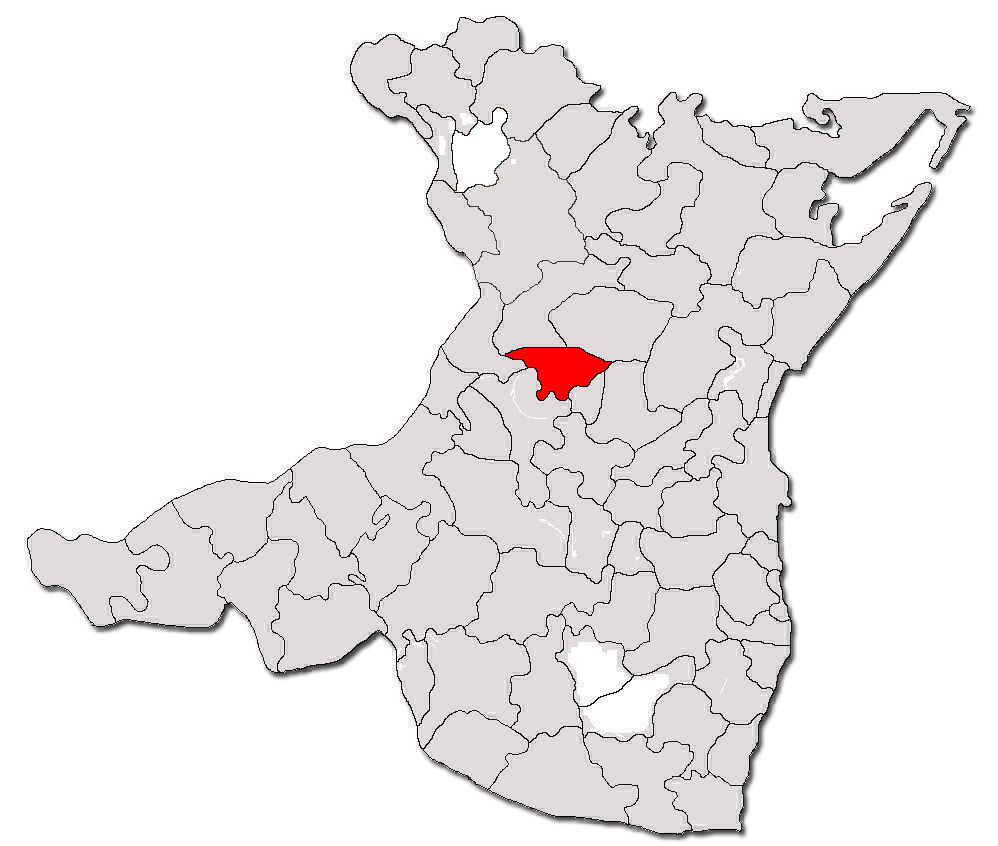
- Location in Constanța County

- Location in Romania
- Coordinates: 44°21′N 28°13′E
- Country: Romania
- County: Constanța
- Subdivisions: Tortoman, Dropia

Government
  - Mayor (2020–2024): Lucian Chitic (PSD)
- Area: 99.11 km^{2} (38.27 sq mi)
- Population (2021-12-01): 1,547
  - Density: 15.61/km^{2} (40.43/sq mi)
- Time zone: UTC+02:00 (EET)
  - Summer (DST): UTC+03:00 (EEST)
- Vehicle reg.: CT
- Website: www.primaria-tortoman.ro

Tortoman (Romanian pronunciation: [tortoˈman]) is a commune in Constanța County, Northern Dobruja, Romania.

The commune includes two villages:

- Tortoman
- Dropia (historical names: Derinchioi, Turkish: Derinköy)

The commune's name is of Turkish origin.

== Demographics ==
At the 2011 census, Tortoman had 1,616 Romanians (99.88%), 2 others (0.12%).
