= Dofteana =

- Commune
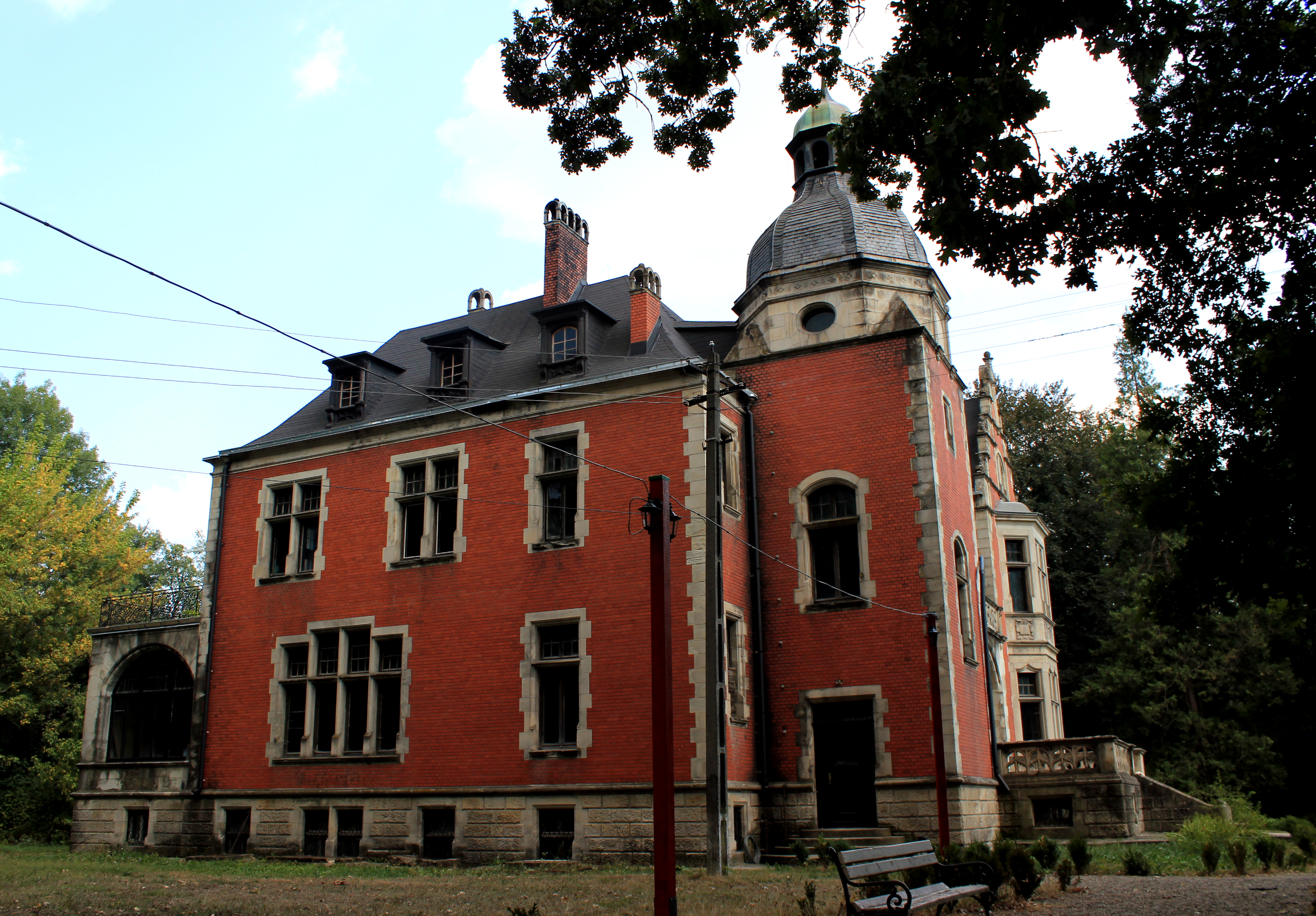
- Ghika Palace

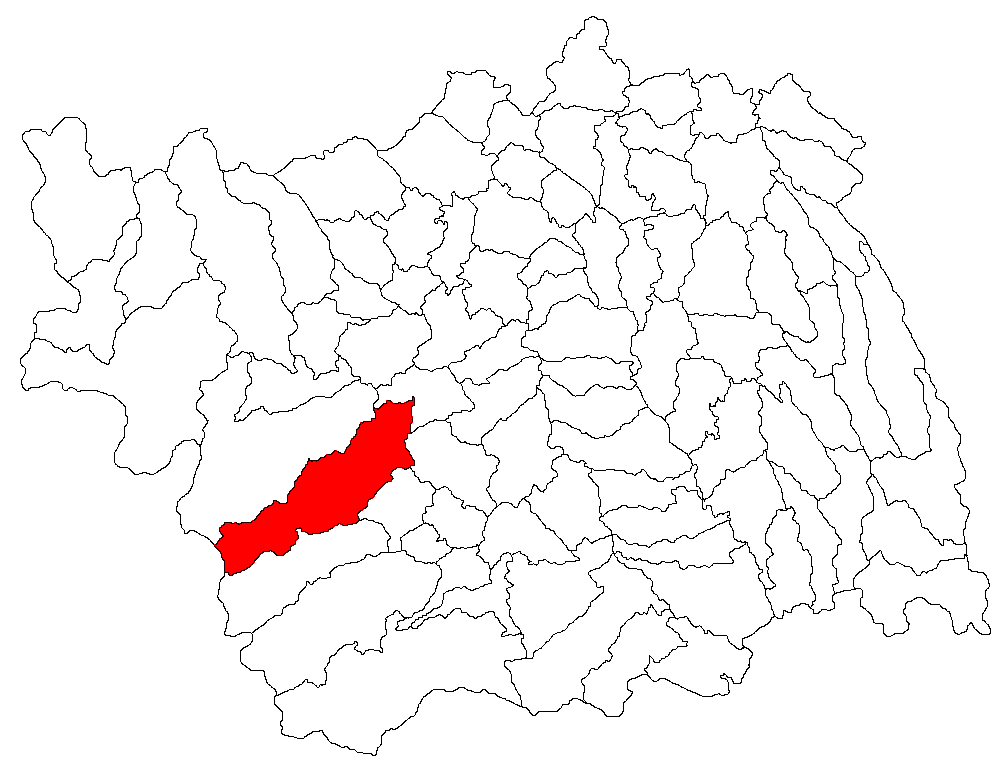
- Location in Bacău County

- Location in Romania
- Coordinates: 46°19′N 26°31′E
- Country: Romania
- County: Bacău

Government
  - Mayor (2024–2028): Ioan Bujor (PSD)
- Area: 173.98 km^{2} (67.17 sq mi)
- Elevation: 325 m (1,066 ft)
- Population (2021-12-01): 10,236
  - Density: 58.834/km^{2} (152.38/sq mi)
- Time zone: UTC+02:00 (EET)
  - Summer (DST): UTC+03:00 (EEST)
- Postal code: 607160
- Area code: +(40) 234
- Vehicle reg.: BC
- Website: primariadofteana.ro

Dofteana (Hungarian: Doftána) is a commune in Bacău County, Western Moldavia, Romania. It is composed of seven villages: Bogata (Bogáta), Cucuieți (Kukujéc), Dofteana, Hăghiac, Larga (Lárga), Seaca, and Ștefan Vodă.

The commune is situated around confluence between the Trotuș and Dofteana rivers. It was first attested in a document of 1436, issued by the hospodar Ștefăniță, who donated to his adviser Babor Plopescu six villages on the Trotuș and Tazlău valleys, one of which was Dofteana, called Dohtana in that period.

At the 2011 census, the commune had 9,346 inhabitants; of those for whom data were available, 98.6% were Romanians and 1.3% Roma.

Village	Population (2002)
Bogata	874
Cucuieți	2,468
Dofteana	3,013
Hăghiac	1,502
Larga	1,374
Seaca	505
Ștefan Vodă	1,192
Total	10,928
