= Ferești =

- Commune
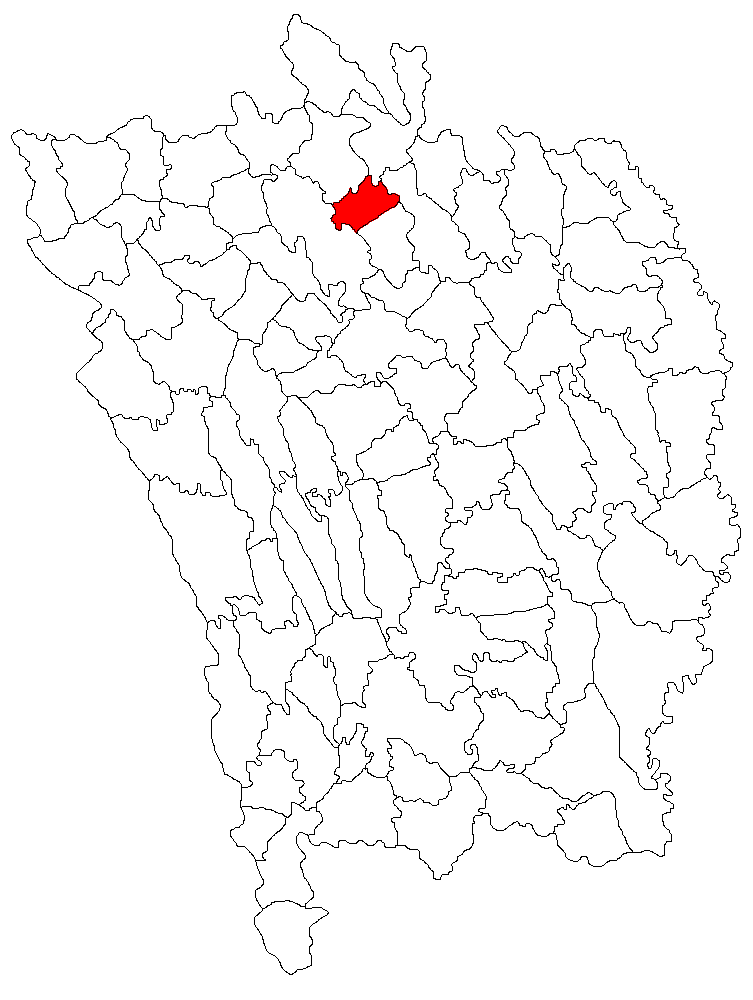
- Location in Vaslui County

- Location in Romania
- Coordinates: 46°47′N 27°42′E
- Country: Romania
- County: Vaslui

Government
  - Mayor (2020–2024): Sebastian Arteni (PSD)
- Population (2021-12-01): 1,871
- Time zone: EET/EEST (UTC+2/+3)
- Postal code: 737566
- Vehicle reg.: VS

Ferești is a commune in Vaslui County, Western Moldavia, Romania. It is composed of a single village, Ferești. This was part of Văleni Commune until 2004, when it was split off.
