= Siliștea, Constanța =

Siliștea
- Commune
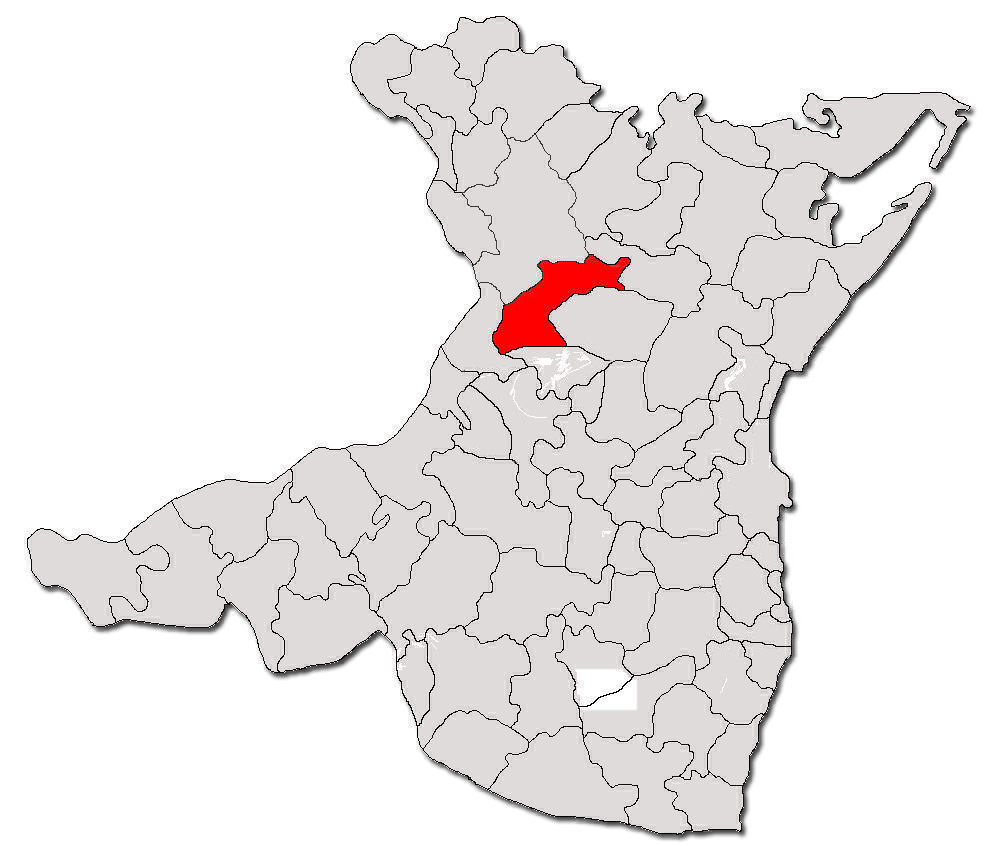
- Location in Constanța County

- Location in Romania
- Coordinates: 44°24′N 28°10′E
- Country: Romania
- County: Constanța
- Subdivisions: Siliștea, Țepeș Vodă

Government
  - Mayor (2020–2024): Mihai Soare (PSD)
- Area: 71.54 km^{2} (27.62 sq mi)
- Population (2021-12-01): 1,185
  - Density: 16.56/km^{2} (42.90/sq mi)
- Time zone: UTC+02:00 (EET)
  - Summer (DST): UTC+03:00 (EEST)
- Vehicle reg.: CT
- Website: www.primaria-silistea.ro

Siliștea (Romanian pronunciation: [ˈsiliʃte̯a]) is a commune in Constanța County, Northern Dobruja, Romania.

The commune includes two villages:

- Siliștea (historical name: Tașpunor, Tașpunar or Taș-Punar, Turkish: Taşpınar)
- Țepeș Vodă (historical names: Chiorcișme, Chior-Cișmea, Turkish: Körçeşme) - named after Vlad III the Impaler (Vlad Țepeș in the common Romanian reference)

== Demographics ==
At the 2011 census, Siliștea had 1,270 Romanians (97.09%), 38 Tatars (2.91%).
