= Vălișoara =

- Commune
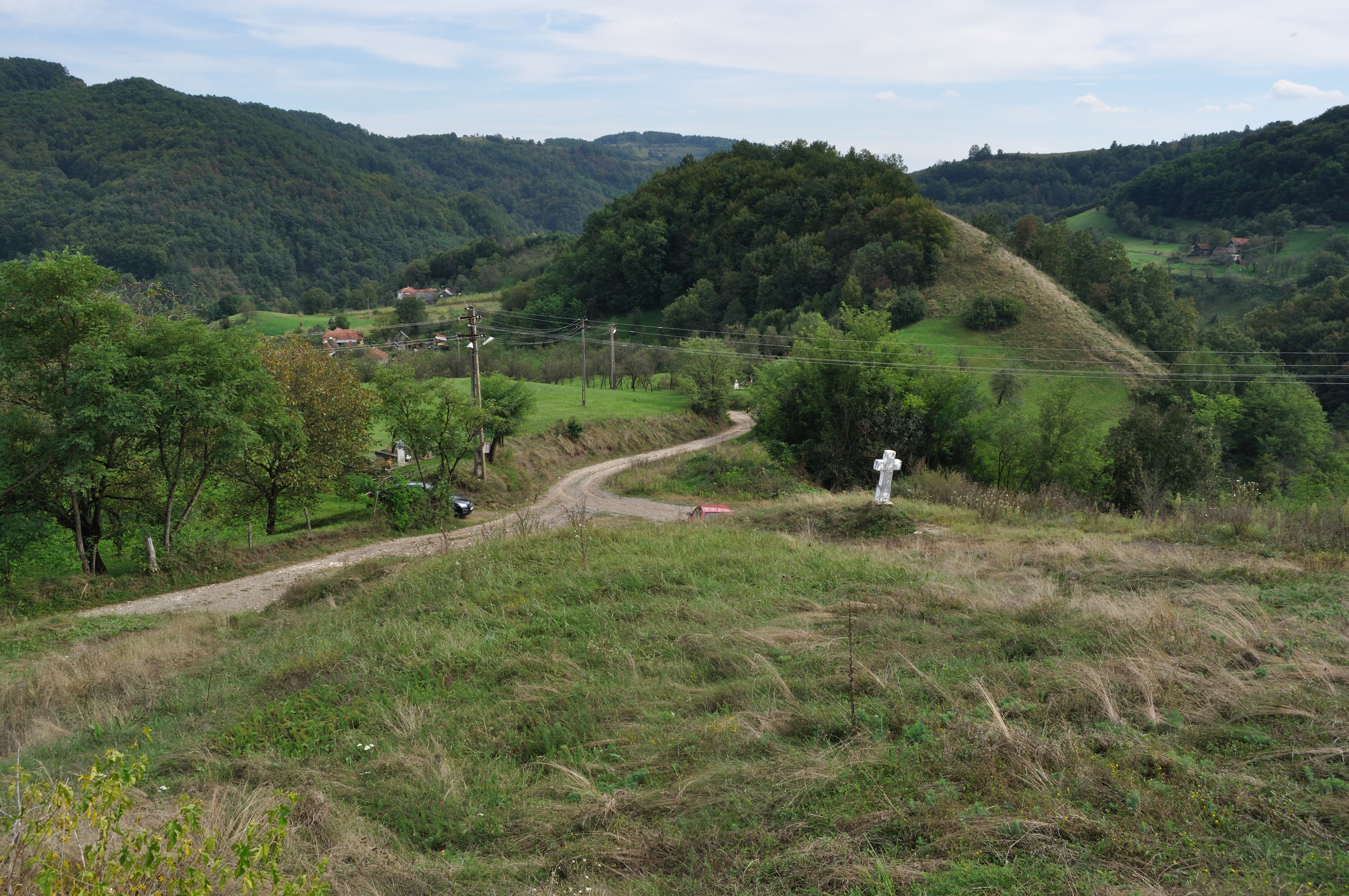
- Săliștioara

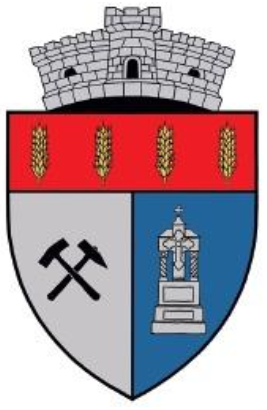
- Coat of arms

- Location in Hunedoara County

- Location in Romania
- Coordinates: 46°03′N 22°50′E
- Country: Romania
- County: Hunedoara

Government
  - Mayor (2024–2028): Camelia Bedea (PSD)
- Area: 34.04 km^{2} (13.14 sq mi)
- Elevation: 425 m (1,394 ft)
- Population (2021-12-01): 1,018
  - Density: 29.91/km^{2} (77.46/sq mi)
- Time zone: UTC+02:00 (EET)
  - Summer (DST): UTC+03:00 (EEST)
- Postal code: 337520
- Area code: +(40) 254
- Vehicle reg.: HD
- Website: primariavalisoara.ro

Vălișoara (Hungarian: Valisora, formerly Kőfalu) is a commune in Hunedoara County, Transylvania, Romania. It is composed of four villages: Dealu Mare (Gyalumáre), Săliștioara (Szelistyora), Stoieneasa (Sztojenyásza), and Vălișoara.

Historical population
Year	Pop.	±%
1850	1,781	—
1920	2,630	+47.7%
2002	1,388	−47.2%
2011	1,197	−13.8%
2021	1,018	−15.0%
Source: Census data
