= Văleni, Vaslui =

Văleni
- Commune
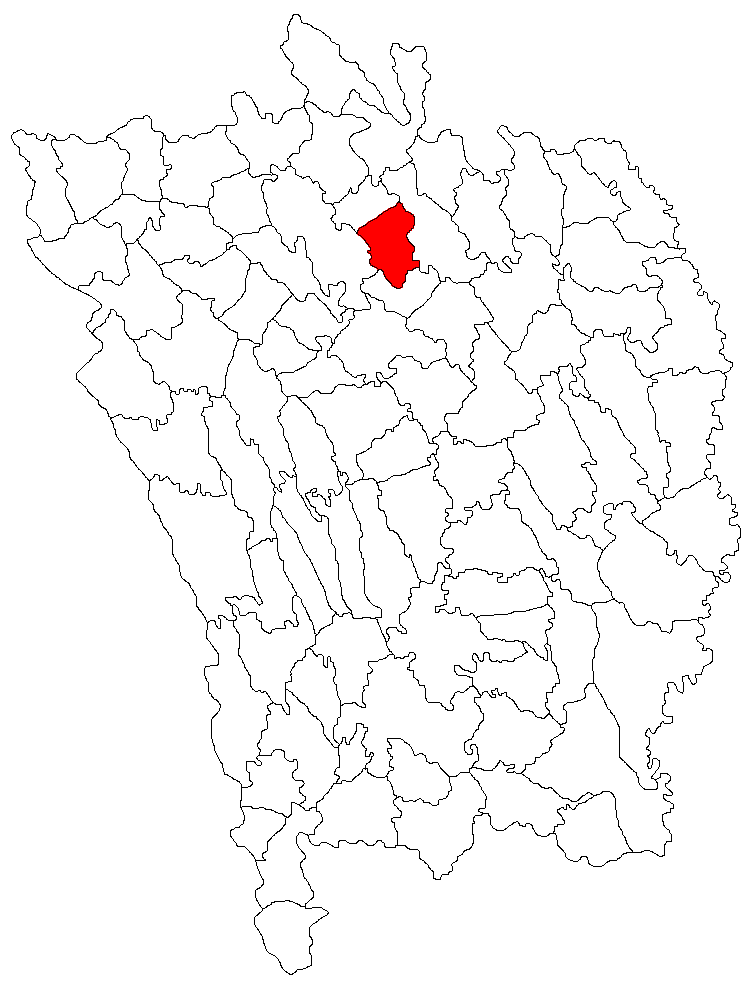
- Location in Vaslui County

- Location in Romania
- Coordinates: 46°45′N 27°45′E
- Country: Romania
- County: Vaslui

Government
  - Mayor (2020–2024): Radu Beligan (PNL)
- Population (2021-12-01): 3,945
- Time zone: EET/EEST (UTC+2/+3)
- Vehicle reg.: VS

Văleni is a commune in Vaslui County, Western Moldavia, Romania. It is composed of two villages, Moara Domnească and Văleni. It included the village of Ferești until 2004, when it was split off to form a separate commune.
