= Tăcuta =

- Commune
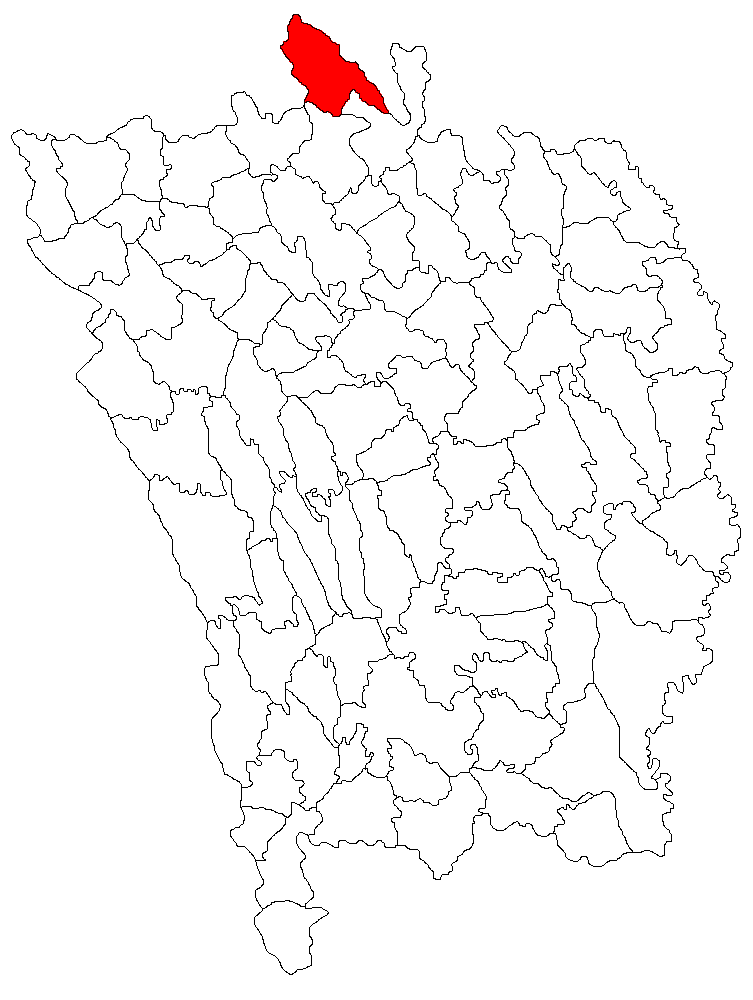
- Location in Vaslui County

- Location in Romania
- Coordinates: 46°55′N 27°41′E
- Country: Romania
- County: Vaslui
- Subdivisions: Cujba, Dumasca, Focșeasca, Mircești, Protopopești, Sofieni, Tăcuta
- Population (2021-12-01): 2,748
- Time zone: EET/EEST (UTC+2/+3)
- Vehicle reg.: VS

Tăcuta is a commune in Vaslui County, Western Moldavia, Romania. It is composed of seven villages: Cujba, Dumasca, Focșeasca, Mircești, Protopopești, Sofieni and Tăcuta.
