= Noșlac =

- Commune
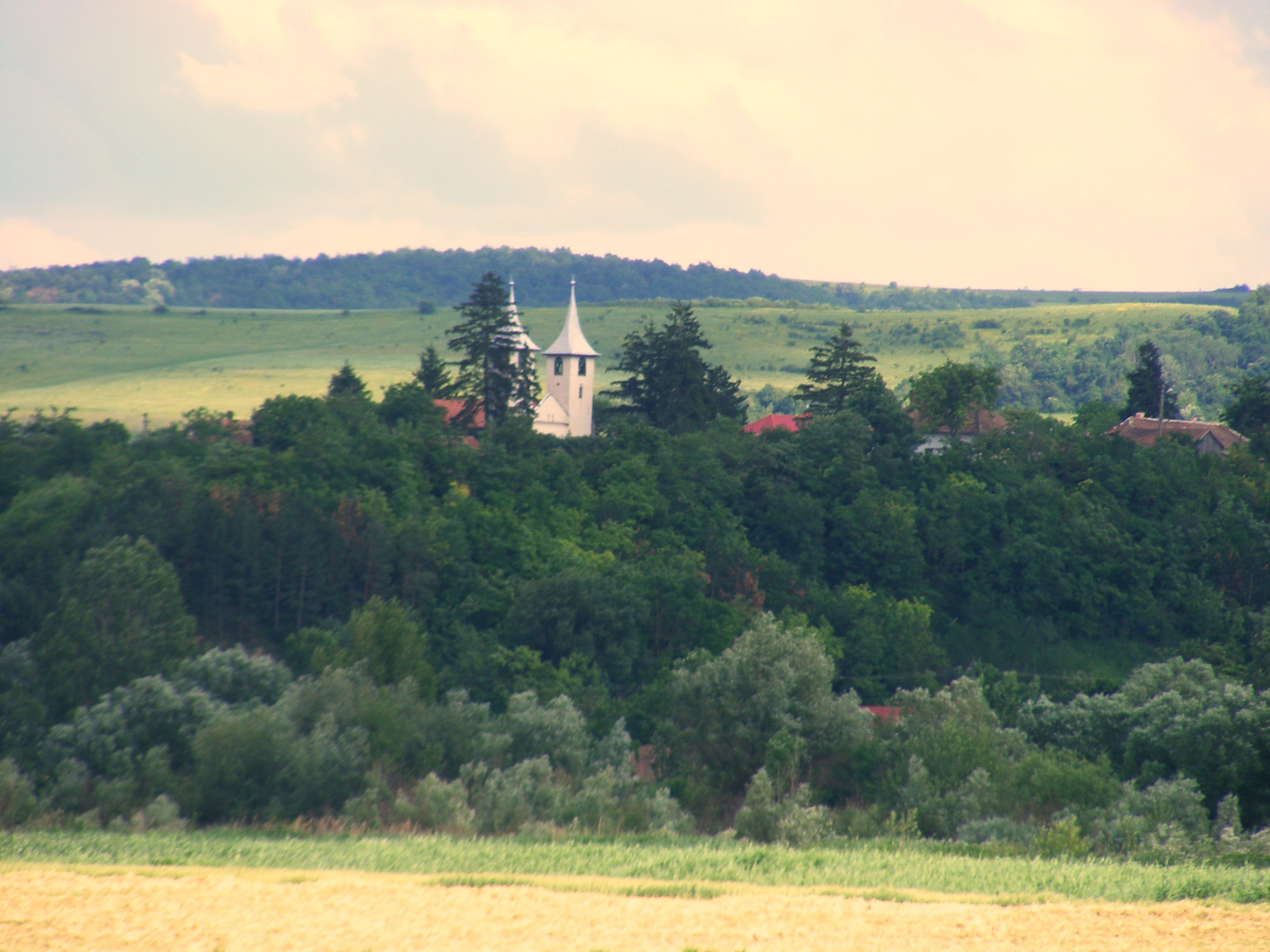
- Noșlac

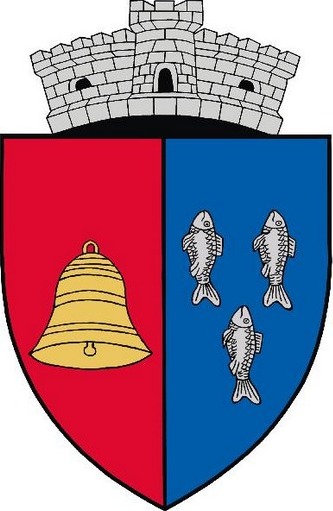
- Coat of arms

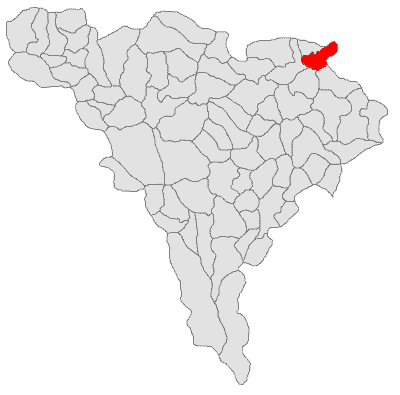
- Location in Alba County

- Location in Romania
- Coordinates: 46°24′N 23°56′E
- Country: Romania
- County: Alba

Government
  - Mayor (2020–2024): Florin Claudiu Zilahi (PNL)
- Area: 48.35 km^{2} (18.67 sq mi)
- Elevation: 305 m (1,001 ft)
- Population (2021-12-01): 1,625
  - Density: 33.61/km^{2} (87.05/sq mi)
- Time zone: UTC+02:00 (EET)
  - Summer (DST): UTC+03:00 (EEST)
- Postal code: 517515
- Area code: (+40) 02 58
- Vehicle reg.: AB
- Website: www.primarianoslac.ro

Noșlac (German: Grosshaus; Hungarian: Marosnagylak) is a commune located in Alba County, Transylvania, Romania. It is composed of six villages: Căptălan (Maroskáptalan), Copand (Maroskoppánd), Găbud (Gábod), Noșlac, Stâna de Mureș (Maroscsúcs), and Valea Ciuciului (Zilahipatak).

== Geography ==
The commune lies on the Transylvanian Plateau, on the left bank of the river Mureș, close to where the river Fărău flows into the Mureș.

Noșlac is located in the northeastern corner of Alba County, on the border with Cluj and Mureș counties. It is situated 8 km (5 mi) east of the town of Ocna Mureș and 60 km (37 mi) north of the county seat, Alba Iulia.

Historical population
| Year | Pop. | ±% |
|---|---|---|
| 1850 | 2,560 | — |
| 1900 | 3,341 | +30.5% |
| 1956 | 3,855 | +15.4% |
| 2002 | 2,035 | −47.2% |
| 2011 | 1,661 | −18.4% |
| 2021 | 1,625 | −2.2% |
Source: INS, Census data
