= Codăești =

- Commune
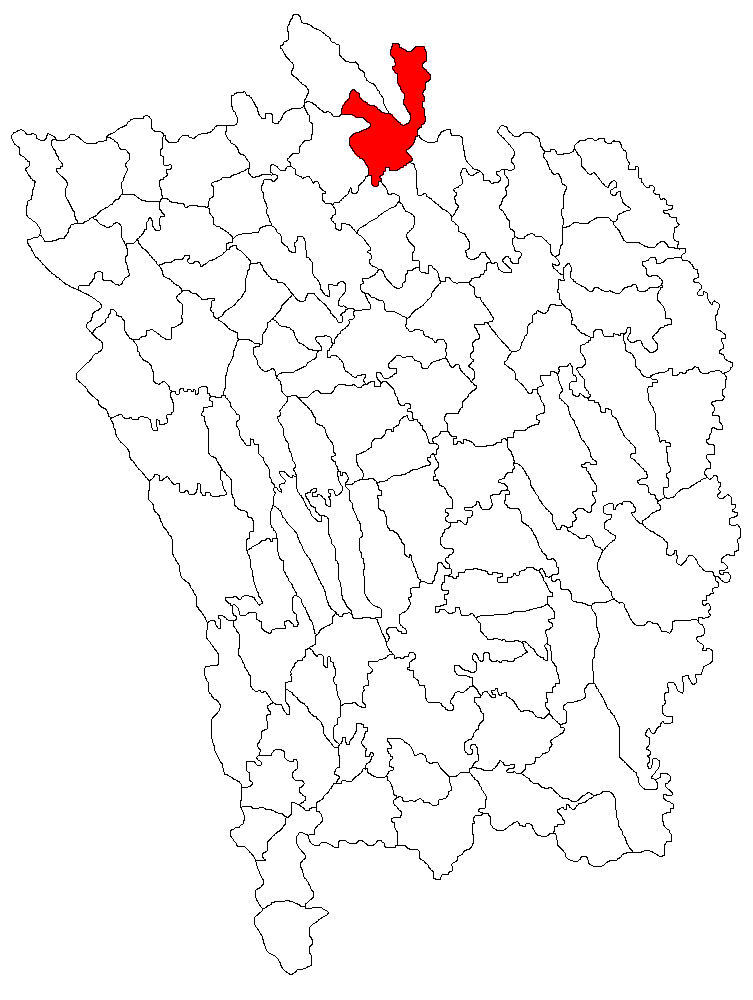
- Location in Vaslui County

- Location in Romania
- Coordinates: 46°52′N 27°45′E
- Country: Romania
- County: Vaslui

Government
  - Mayor (2020–2024): Anișoara Lupu (PNL)
- Population (2021-12-01): 3,912
- Time zone: EET/EEST (UTC+2/+3)
- Vehicle reg.: VS

Codăești is a commune in Vaslui County, Western Moldavia, Romania. It is composed of four villages: Codăești, Ghergheleu, Pribești and Rediu Galian.

Natives include communist politician Ana Pauker (1893-1960), and mathematician and member of the Romanian Academy, Radu Miron (b. 1927).
