= Șoimuș =

- Commune
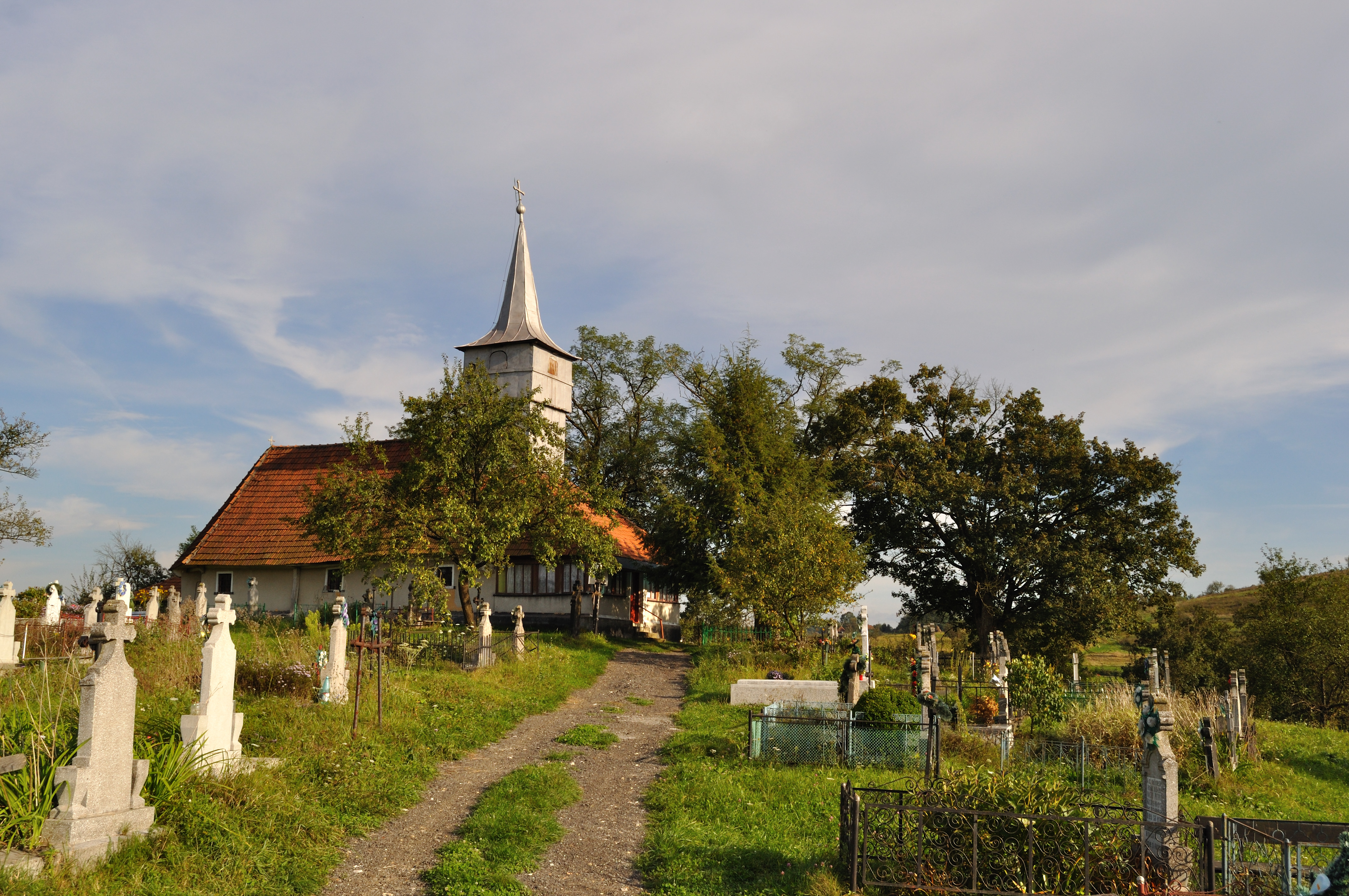
- Wooden church in Sulighete

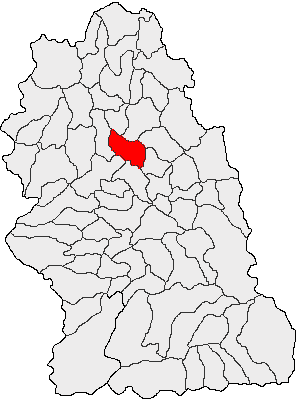
- Location in Hunedoara County

- Location in Romania
- Coordinates: 45°55′1″N 22°53′23″E
- Country: Romania
- County: Hunedoara

Government
  - Mayor (2024–2028): Mihai-Gabriel Irimie (PNL)
- Area: 68.59 km^{2} (26.48 sq mi)
- Elevation: 194 m (636 ft)
- Population (2021-12-01): 3,386
  - Density: 49.37/km^{2} (127.9/sq mi)
- Time zone: UTC+02:00 (EET)
  - Summer (DST): UTC+03:00 (EEST)
- Postal code: 337450
- Area code: (+40) 02 54
- Vehicle reg.: HD
- Website: soimus.ro

Șoimuș (Hungarian: Marossolymos, German: Falkendorf) is a commune in Hunedoara County, Transylvania, Romania. It is composed of ten villages: Bălata (Balátatelep), Bejan (Bezsán), Bejan-Târnăvița (Bezsántelep), Boholt (Boholt), Căinelu de Jos (Alsókajanel), Chișcădaga (Kecskedága), Fornădia (Fornádia), Păuliș (until 1960 Buruene; Burjánfalva), Sulighete (Szúliget), and Șoimuș.

The commune at situated in the southwestern extremity of the Transylvanian Plateau, in the southern foothills of the Metaliferi Mountains, on the right bank of the Mureș River. It is located in the central part of Hunedoara County, just north of the county seat, Deva. Șoimuș is crossed south to north by national road DN76 (part of European Road E79), which connects Deva to Oradea. Parallel to it is the A1 motorway, which starts in Bucharest and ends in Nădlac, at the Hungarian border

For about 20 years, the Șoimuș train station served the Căile Ferate Române Line 209, which connected Deva to Brad. Construction of the rail line started in April 1939. During World War II, Jews and Soviet prisoners of war worked on the project; up to a 1,000 are said to have died due to the harsh conditions there. The project was restarted in 1960, with a 301 m (988 ft) rail bridge over the river Mureș, and was completed in the mid-1980s.

Historical population
Year	Pop.	±%
1850	3,910	—
1900	4,962	+26.9%
1910	5,219	+5.2%
1941	4,952	−5.1%
2002	3,549	−28.3%
2011	3,371	−5.0%
2021	3,386	+0.4%
Source: Census data
