= Râmnicu Sărat County =

Județul Râmnicu Sărat
- County (Județ)
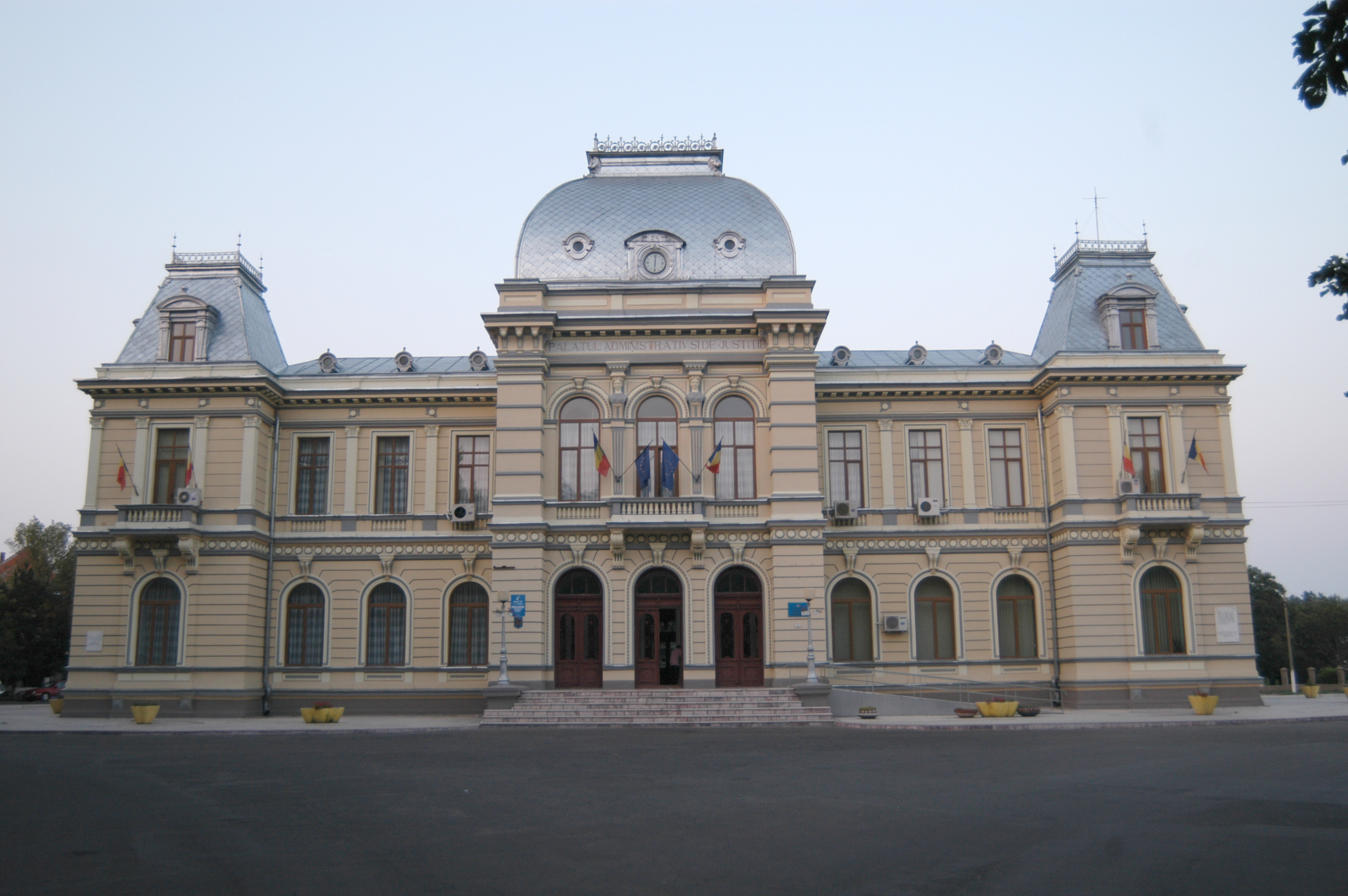
- Râmnicu Sărat County prefecture office during the interwar period, now used as Râmnicu Sărat city hall

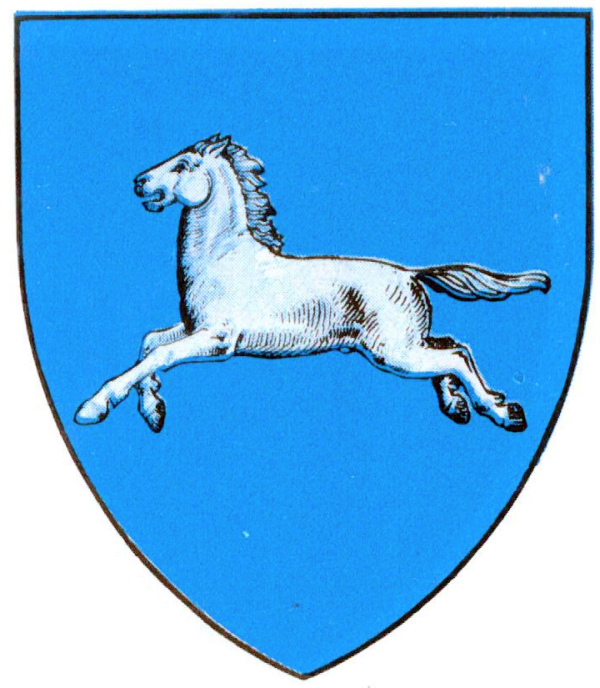
- Coat of arms

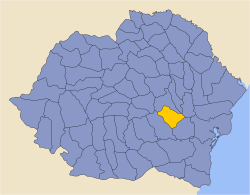
- Country: Romania
- Historic region: Wallachia
- Capital city (Reședință de județ): Râmnicu Sărat
- Established: 1862
- Ceased to exist: Administrative reform of 1950

Area
  - Total: 3,324 km^{2} (1,283 sq mi)

Population (1930)
  - Total: 184,956
  - Density: 55.64/km^{2} (144.1/sq mi)
- Time zone: UTC+2 (EET)
  - Summer (DST): UTC+3 (EEST)

Râmnicu Sărat County is one of the historic counties of Muntenia, Romania. The county seat was Râmnicu Sărat.

== Geography ==
Râmnicu Sărat County covered 3,324 km^{2} and was located in central-south-eastern part of Greater Romania, in the northeastern part of the historical region of Muntenia. Currently, the territory that comprised Râmnicu Sărat County is now included in the Brăila, Buzău, and Vrancea counties. In the interwar period, the county neighbored Putna and Tecuci counties to the north, Covurlui County to the east, Brăila County to the southeast, and Buzău County to the southwest.

== History ==
Slam Râmnic County (the old name of Râmnicu Sărat County) dates back to the period of the medieval organization of Wallachia. At first, the county's seat was at Focșanii Munteni, located on the right bank of the Milcov River, separating it from the city of Focșani proper that belonged to Moldavia. In 1542, when the Ottoman Empire annexed Brăila and its surrounding area, Slam Râmnic County received the rest of the territory previously administered by Brăila. In 1862, with the establishment of the Romanian state, entailing the political unification of Wallachia with Moldavia, the seat of the county was moved to Râmnicu Sărat, because it was a bigger trade centre in the middle of the county and renamed to Râmnicu Sărat, after the town. Focșanii Munteni was also joined with Focșani on the Moldavian side, becoming the seat of Putna County. The buildings in Râmnicu Sărat in which the county institutions functioned were properly purchased and equipped until 1900.

In 1938, the county was disestablished and incorporated into the newly formed Ținutul Dunării, but it was re-established in 1940 after the fall of Carol II's regime - only to be abolished on 6 September 1950 by the Communist regime.

The county was disbanded in administrative reforms of Communist Romania 1950, its southern area, including the county seat, was included in Regiunea Buzău, which itself was included after two years into Regiunea Ploiești in which the Râmnicu Sărat rayon was constituted; most of the county's north went to Regiunea Putna and then afterward to Regiunea Bârlad, whilst a small part of the eastern area (along the left bank of the Buzău River, until its discharge into the Siret) passed to Regiunea Galați. The northern areas were also passed in their turn in 1960 to Regiunea Galați. In 1968, when Romania returned to county organization, Râmnicu Sărat County was not re-established.

== Administrative organization ==
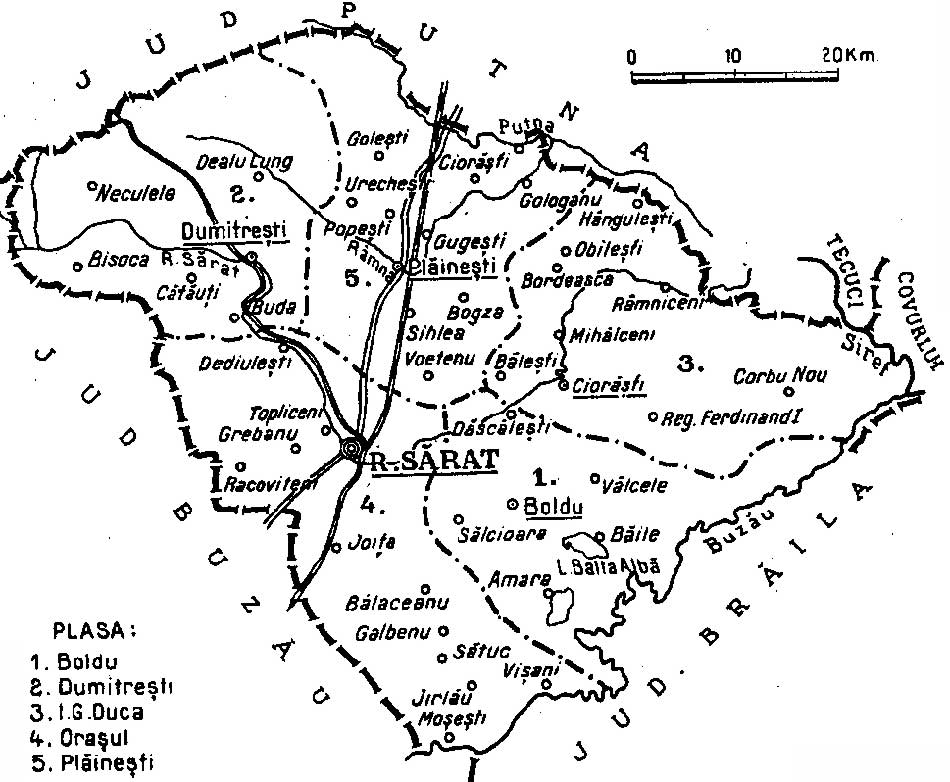
Map of Râmnicu Sărat County as constituted in 1938

At the end of the nineteenth century, the county was divided into seven districts (plăși):

1. Plasma Râmnicul, headquartered at Dumitrești, with the communes of Jitia, Bisoca, Dumitrești, Chiojdeni, Buda, Dănulești, Dealu Lung, and Valea Salciei
2. Plasa Orașul, the northernmost area around the town of Focșani, the headquarters before 1859, later headquartered at Cotești, with the communes: Andreiași, Blidari, Bonțești, Budești, Broșteni, Câmpineanca, Cârligi, Cotești, Golești, Faraoanele, Odobasca, Risipiți and Vârteșcoiu
3. Plasa Gradiștea, headquartered at Grădiștea de Sus, with the communes: Amara, Balta Albă, Boldu, Câineni, Domnița, Gradiștea de Jos, Grădiștea de Sus, Măcrina, Puiești, Racovița, and Ștubeiu
4. Plasa Râmnicul de Sus, headquartered at Râmnicu Sărat, with the communes: Băbeni, Bălțați, Câmpulungeanca, Dedulești, Grebănu, Jideni, Mărgăritești, Obidiți, Pardoși, Putreda, Racovițeni, Zgârciți, and Valea Raței
5. Plasa Marginea de Sus, headquartered at Plăinești, with the communes: Bogza, Bodești, Dragosloveni, Gologanu, Lacu lui Baban, Plăinești, Popești, Sihlea, Slobozia Bradului, Slobozia Ciorăști, Tâmboești, and Voetin
6. Plasa Râmnicul de Jos, headquartered at Bălăceanu, with the communes: Bălăceanu, Costienii de Jos, Costienii Mari, Drogu, Galbenu, Ghergheasa, Jirlău, Nisipurile, Sălcioara, Slobozia, Socariciu, and Vișani
7. Plasa Marginea de Jos, headquartered at Măicănești, with communes: Bălești, Ciorăști, Corbu, Gulianca, Hângulești, Măicănești, Maluri, Mărtinești, Măxineni, Obilești, Râmniceni, and Slobozia-Mihălceni.

In the year 1930, the territory of the county was administratively divided into three districts:

1. Plasa Câmpul, in the southern portion of the county
2. Plasa Dealul, in the northern portion of the county
3. Plasa Muntele, in the western portion of the county

After the administrative-territorial reorganization of the county in 1938 it contained five districts:

1. Plasa Dumitrești, in the northwestern portion of the county, headquartered at Dumitrești
2. Plasa Plăinești, in the northern portion of the county, headquartered at Plăinești
3. Plasa I.G. Duca, in the eastern portion of the county, headquartered at Ciorăști
4. Plasa Boldu, in the southwestern portion of the county, headquartered at Boldu
5. Plasa Orașul, in the southern portion of the county, headquartered at Râmnicu Sărat

=== Population ===
According to the 1930 census data, the county population was 184,956 inhabitants, ethnically divided as follows: 96.3% Romanians, 2.7% Romanies, 0.6% Jews, as well as other minorities. From the religious point of view, the population was 98.9% Eastern Orthodox, 0.6% Jewish, 0.1% Roman Catholic, as well as other minorities.

==== Urban population ====
In 1930, the county's urban population was 15,007 inhabitants, comprising 89.2% Romanians, 6.9% Jews, 1.5% Romanies, 1.0% Hungarians, as well as other minorities. From the religious point of view, the urban population was composed of 91.3% Eastern Orthodox, 6.9% Jewish, 0.8% Roman Catholic, as well as other minorities.
