= Sihlea =

- Commune
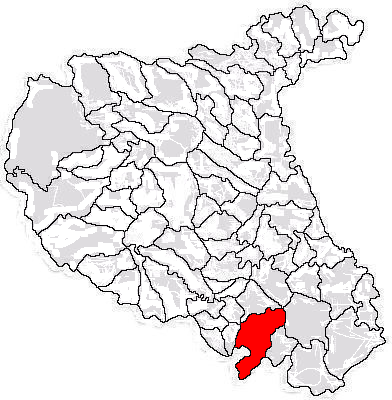
- Location in Vrancea County

- Location in Romania
- Coordinates: 45°30′N 27°7′E
- Country: Romania
- County: Vrancea

Government
  - Mayor (2024–2028): Radu Modreanu (Ind.)
- Area: 88.24 km^{2} (34.07 sq mi)
- Elevation: 105 m (344 ft)
- Population (2021-12-01): 4,989
  - Density: 57/km^{2} (150/sq mi)
- Time zone: EET/EEST (UTC+2/+3)
- Postal code: 627300
- Area code: +(40) 237
- Vehicle reg.: VN
- Website: www.sihlea.primarievn.ro

Sihlea is a commune located in Vrancea County, Romania. It is composed of four villages: Bogza, Căiata, Sihlea, and Voetin.

== Geography ==
The commune is located in the southern extremity of the county, 28 km (17 mi) from the county capital, Focșani. Sihlea is situated on the border with Buzău County, only 17 km (11 mi) from Râmnicu Sărat. It lies on the left bank of the river Coțatcu and on both banks of its tributary, the Slimnic.

Sihlea is crossed by the county road DJ202E, which connects it to the west with Obrejița (where it intersects with national road DN2) and further to Tâmboești, and to the south to Râmnicelu. In the north, it is also crossed by the national road DN2N, which connects it to the east with Tătăranu (where it ends in DN23A) and to the west with Dumbrăveni (where it intersects with the same DN2), Bordești, Dumitrești, Chiojdeni, and Jitia. The partly built A7 motorway, which starts in Ploiești in the direction of Buzău, will enter Vrancea County in Sihlia, continuing north towards Focșani and ending in Siret.

Train stations in Voetin and Sihlea villages serve the CFR Main Line 500, which connects Bucharest with the Ukrainian border near Chernivtsi.

== Demographics ==
Historical population
Year	Pop.	±%
2002	5,326	—
2011	5,039	−5.4%
2021	4,989	−1.0%
Source: Census data

According to the 2011 census, the commune had a population of 5,039, of which 90% were ethnic Romanians and 5.9% were Roma. Ar the 2021 census, Sihlea had a population of 4,989, of which 85.27% were Romanians and 8.34% were Roma.

== Natives ==
- Gheorghe Buzatu (1939–2013), historian and politician
- Alecu Croitoru (1933–2017), film director and actor
