= Râmnicul Sărat =

Râmnicul Sărat Râmnicu Sărat
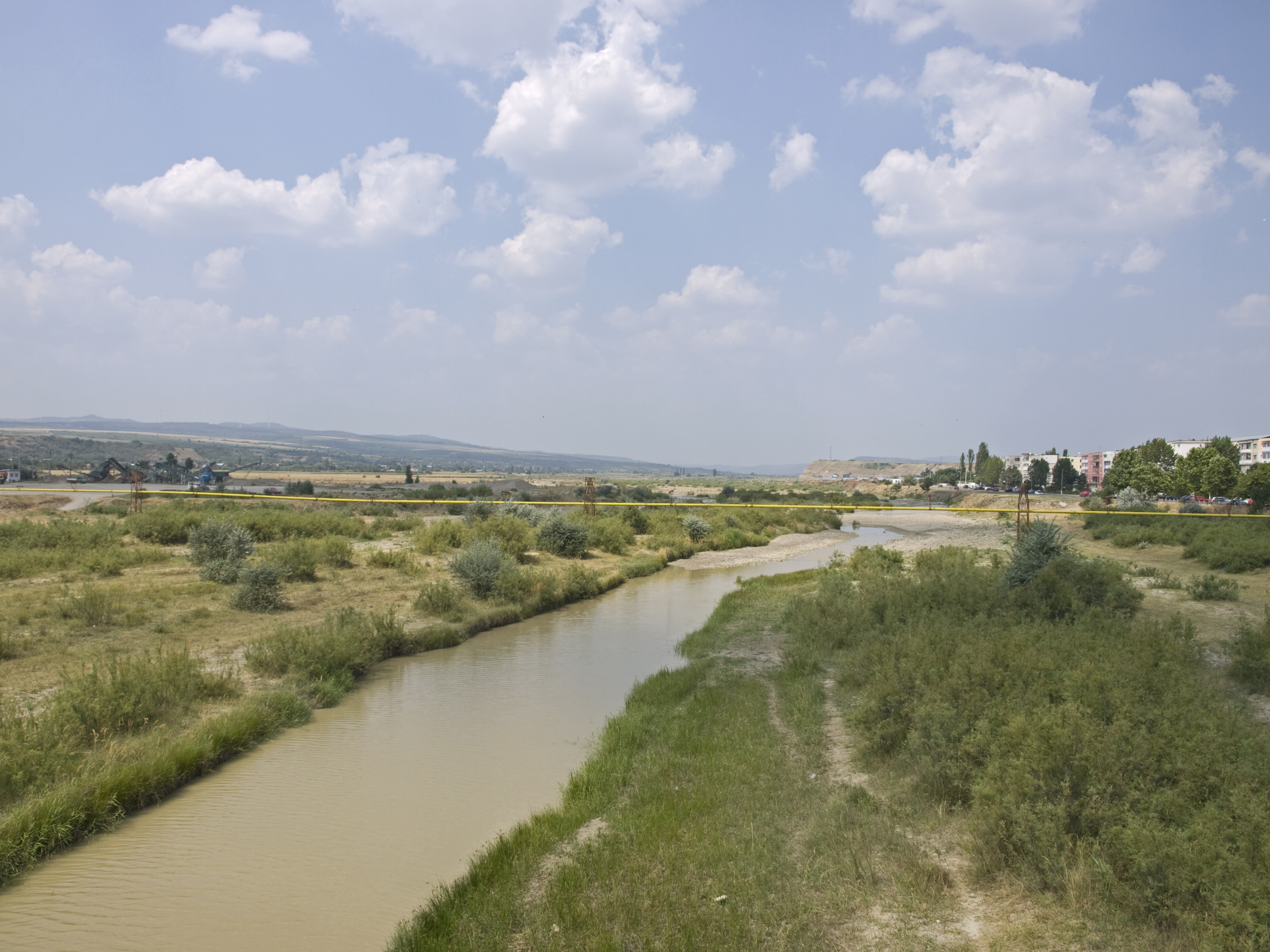
- Râmnicul Sărat in Râmnicu Sărat

- Location within Romania

Location
- Country: Romania
- Counties: Vrancea, Buzău, Galați
- Towns: Râmnicu Sărat

Physical characteristics
- Source: Mount Furul Mare
  - location: Romania
  - coordinates: 45°37′28″N 26°36′40″E
  - elevation: 1,311 m (4,301 ft)
- Mouth: Siret
  - location: Upstream of Nămoloasa, Galați County
  - coordinates: 45°31′30″N 27°31′20″E
- Length: 137 km (85 mi)
- Basin size: 1,063 km^{2} (410 sq mi)
- Discharge
  - location: *
  - average: 2.54 m^{3}/s (90 cu ft/s)

Basin features
- Progression: Siret→ Danube→ Black Sea
- Tributaries
  - left: Motnău, Coțatcu

The Râmnicul Sărat or Râmnicu Sărat is a right tributary of the river Siret in Romania. It discharges into the Siret in Belciugele. The total length of the Râmnicul Sărat from its source to its confluence with the Siret is 137 km (85 mi). Its basin area is 1,063 km^{2} (410 sq mi). Its upper course, above the confluence with the Martin, is sometimes called Mălușel.

== Towns and villages ==
The following towns and villages are situated along the river Râmnicul Sărat, from source to mouth: Jitia, Jitia de Jos, Luncile, Tulburea, Chiojdeni, Dumitreștii de Sus, Dumitrești, Biceștii de Jos, Mucești-Dănulești, Alexandru Odobescu, Buda, Toropălești, Ceairu, Gura Făgetului, Dedulești, Băbeni, Tăbăcari, Răducești, Oratia, Podgoria, Poșta, Râmnicu Sărat, Valea Râmnicului, Rubla, Râmnicelu, Colibași, Știubei, Fotin, Lunca, Plopi, Puieștii de Sus, Măcrina, Puieștii de Jos, Nicolești, Dăscălești, Codrești, Spătăreasa, Ciorăști, Mihălceni, Salcia Veche, Vâjâitoarea, Tătăranu, Râmniceni, Tătaru, Belciugele, and Măicănești.

== Tributaries ==
The following rivers are tributaries to the Râmnicul Sărat (from source to mouth):

Left: Sărățel, Cerbu, Râmnicel, Săritoarea, Tulburea, Rotăria, Motnău, Căprăria, Bădila, Mocanca, Coțatcu, Bălan

Right: Martin, Moldoveanul (or Recea), Ulmușor (or Pârâul Sărat), Râul Vacii Rele, Cătăuț, Buda, Izvorul Pietrelor, Băbeni, Muncelu, Greabăn, Putreda

== History ==
A major battle took place near the river in 1789, during the Russo-Turkish War (1787–1792). It became known as the Battle of Rymnik.
