= Coțatcu =

- Location within Romania

Location
- Country: Romania
- Counties: Buzău, Vrancea
- Villages: Pleșești, Coțatcu, Voetin, Bălești

Physical characteristics
- Source: Căpățâna Hill
  - location: Buzău County
  - coordinates: 45°31′13″N 26°58′28″E
  - elevation: 414 m (1,358 ft)
- Mouth: Râmnicul Sărat
  - location: Vâjâitoarea
  - coordinates: 45°29′40″N 27°18′50″E
  - elevation: 29 m (95 ft)
- Length: 41 km (25 mi)
- Basin size: 321 km^{2} (124 sq mi)

Basin features
- Progression: Râmnicul Sărat→ Siret→ Danube→ Black Sea
- Tributaries
  - left: Cireș, Slimnic
  - right: Viroaga

The Coțatcu is a left tributary of the river Râmnicul Sărat in Romania. It discharges into the Râmnicul Sărat near Vâjâitoarea. Its length is 41 km (25 mi) and its basin size is 321 km^{2} (124 sq mi).
