= Slimnic (Coțatcu) =

- Location within Romania

Location
- Country: Romania
- Counties: Vrancea County

Physical characteristics
- Source: Trandafir Hill
  - coordinates: 45°33′20″N 26°58′36″E
  - elevation: 316 m (1,037 ft)
- Mouth: Coțatcu
  - location: Upstream of Vâjâitoarea
  - coordinates: 45°28′2″N 27°16′9″E
  - elevation: 35 m (115 ft)
- Length: 31 km (19 mi)
- Basin size: 94 km^{2} (36 sq mi)

Basin features
- Progression: Coțatcu→ Râmnicul Sărat→ Siret→ Danube→ Black Sea
- Tributaries
  - right: Dulcea

The Slimnic is a left tributary of the river Coțatcu in Romania. It discharges into the Râmnicul Sărat near Vâjâitoarea. The upper reach of the river is sometimes referred to as Tâmboești. It flows through the villages Bordeștii de Jos, Tâmboești, Slimnic, Obrejița, Sihlea and Bogza. Its length is 31 km (19 mi) and its basin size is 94 km^{2} (36 sq mi).
