= Cireș (Coțatcu) =

- Location within Romania

Location
- Country: Romania
- Counties: Buzău, Vrancea
- Villages: Coțatcu, Voetin

Physical characteristics
- Source: Coțatcu, Buzău County
  - coordinates: 45°28′47″N 27°0′21″E
  - elevation: 340 m (1,120 ft)
- Mouth: Coțatcu
  - location: Voetin, Vrancea County
  - coordinates: 45°26′56″N 27°8′17″E
  - elevation: 73 m (240 ft)
- Length: 12 km (7.5 mi)
- Basin size: 34 km^{2} (13 sq mi)

Basin features
- Progression: Coțatcu→ Râmnicul Sărat→ Siret→ Danube→ Black Sea

The Cireș is a left tributary of the river Coțatcu in Romania. It discharges into the Coțatcu in Voetin. Its length is 12 km (7.5 mi) and its basin size is 34 km^{2} (13 sq mi).
