= Viroaga =

- Location within Romania

Location
- Country: Romania
- Counties: Vrancea County

Physical characteristics
- Mouth: Coțatcu
  - location: Upstream of Bălești
  - coordinates: 45.4409°N 27.1980°E
  - elevation: 35 m (115 ft)
- Length: 13 km (8.1 mi)
- Basin size: 44 km^{2} (17 sq mi)

Basin features
- Progression: Coțatcu→ Râmnicul Sărat→ Siret→ Danube→ Black Sea

The Viroaga is a right tributary of the river Coțatcu in Romania. The Crângu Ursului Dam is located on this river. Its length is 13 km (8.1 mi) and its basin size is 44 km^{2} (17 sq mi).
