= Slimnic (disambiguation) =

Slimnic may refer to the following places in Romania:

- Slimnic, a commune in Sibiu County
- Slimnic, a village in the commune Tâmboești, Vrancea County
- Slimnic (Coțatcu), a tributary of the Coțatcu in Vrancea County
- Slimnic (Vișa), a tributary of the Vișa in Sibiu County
