= Blidari =

Blidari may refer to several villages in Romania:

- Blidari, a village in Căiuți Commune, Bacău County
- Blidari, a village in Cobia Commune, Dâmboviţa County
- Blidari, a village in Bălănești, Gorj
- Blidari, a village in Baia Mare city, Maramureș County
- Blidari, a village in Golești, Vâlcea
- Blidari, a village in Cârligele Commune, Vrancea County
- Blidari, a village in Dumitrești Commune, Vrancea County
