= Sătuc =

Sătuc may refer to several villages:

- Sătuc, a village in Pelinei Commune, Cahul district, Moldova
- Sătuc, a village in Galbenu Commune, Brăila County, Romania
- Sătuc, a village in Berca Commune, Buzău County, Romania
