= Râmnicel =

- Location within Romania

Location
- Country: Romania
- Counties: Vrancea County
- Villages: Poiana Stoichii, Măgura, Jitia

Physical characteristics
- Source: Poiana Stoichii
  - coordinates: 45°39′17″N 26°44′53″E
  - elevation: 721 m (2,365 ft)
- Mouth: Râmnicul Sărat
  - location: Jitia
  - coordinates: 45°35′14″N 26°45′45″E
  - elevation: 448 m (1,470 ft)
- Length: 9 km (5.6 mi)
- Basin size: 41 km^{2} (16 sq mi)

Basin features
- Progression: Râmnicul Sărat→ Siret→ Danube→ Black Sea
- Tributaries
  - left: Pucioase
  - right: Palanca, Pârâul Mare

The Râmnicel is a left tributary of the river Râmnicul Sărat in Romania. It discharges into the Râmnicul Sărat near Jitia. Its length is 9 km (5.6 mi) and its basin size is 41 km^{2} (16 sq mi).
