= Râmnicelu =

Râmnicelu may refer to several places in Romania:

- Râmnicelu, a commune in Brăila County
- Râmnicelu, a commune in Buzău County
