= Milcovul =

- Commune
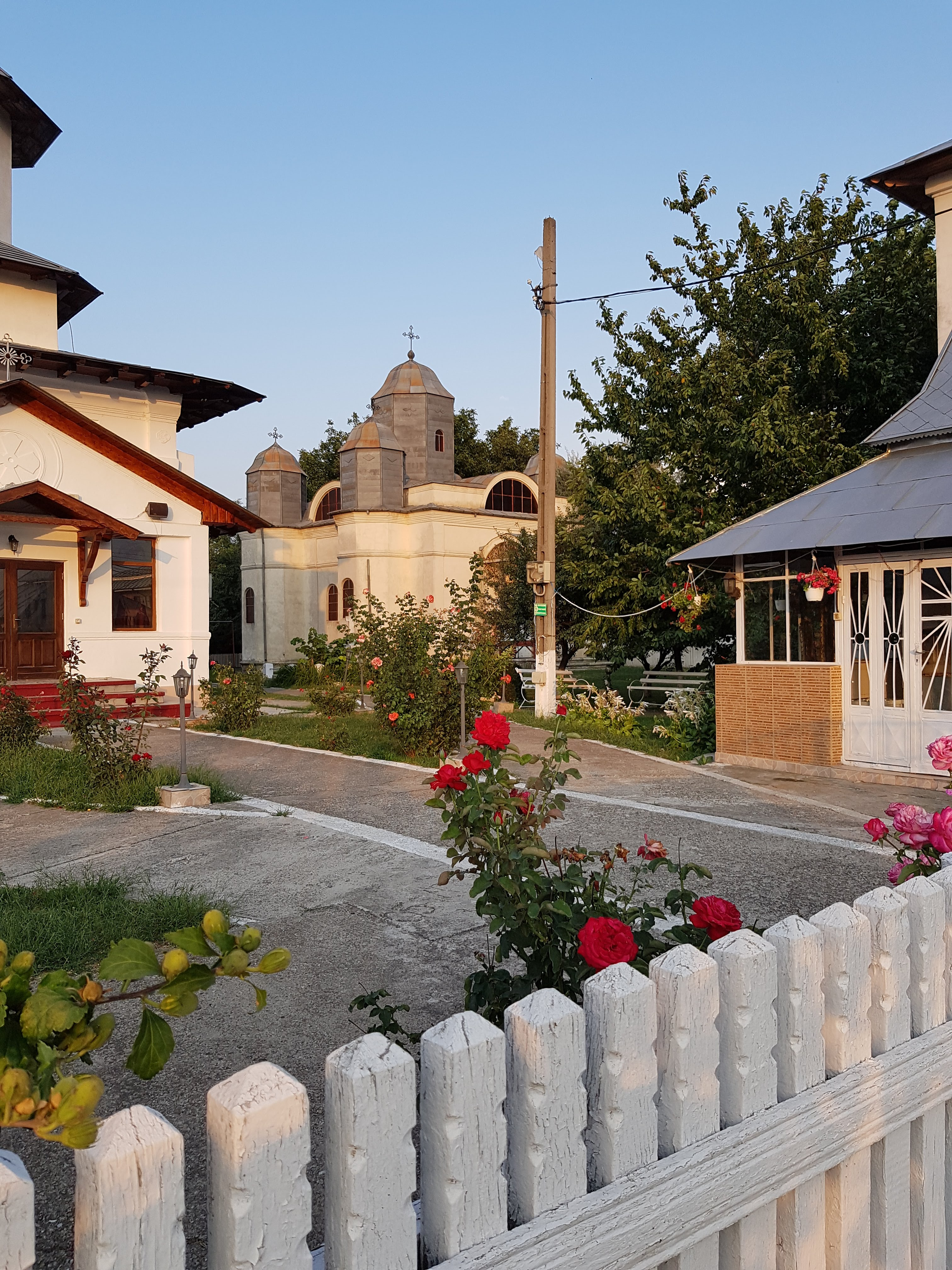
- St. Catherine Church in Milcovul

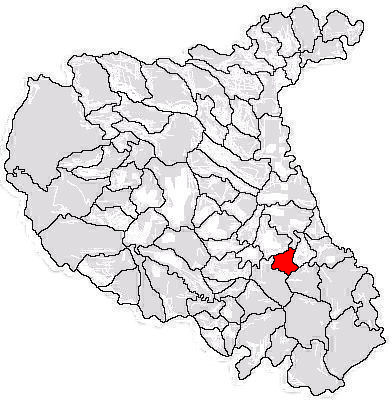
- Location in Vrancea County

- Location in Romania
- Coordinates: 45°39′N 27°15′E
- Country: Romania
- County: Vrancea

Government
  - Mayor (2024–2028): Mihai Neață (PSD)
- Area: 27.53 km^{2} (10.63 sq mi)
- Elevation: 33 m (108 ft)
- Population (2021-12-01): 3,537
  - Density: 128.5/km^{2} (332.8/sq mi)
- Time zone: UTC+02:00 (EET)
  - Summer (DST): UTC+03:00 (EEST)
- Postal code: 627205
- Area code: +(40) 237
- Vehicle reg.: VN
- Website: www.primariamilcovul.ro

Milcovul (called Risipiți until 1964) is a commune in Vrancea County, Romania. It is located in the historical region of Muntenia. It is composed of two villages, Lămotești and Milcovul, and also included Gologanu and Răstoaca from 1968, until these became separate communes again in 2004.

The commune is situated in the northern reaches of the Wallachian Plain, on the banks of the Milcov River. It is located in the southeastern part of Vrancea County, 9 km (5.6 mi) southeast of the county seat, Focșani; its other neighbors are the following communes: Răstoaca to the northeast, Gologanu to the south, and Slobozia Ciorăști to the southwest. Milcovul is crossed by national road DN23A, which connects Focșani to Ciorăști.

== Dispute over medieval civitas de Mylco ==
In 1228, the Roman Catholic Church established the Diocese of Cumania, a bishopric which served the Cumans and the Teutonic Knights in the Burzenland. In his 1278 letter, Pope Nicholas III wrote that the civitas de Mylco (on the Milcov River) was the seat of the Cumanian bishop. Its location is the subject of scholarly debate, various historians and archaeologists identifying it successively with Odobești, Reghiu, and more recently with the Crăciuna Citadel at Câmpineanca and with Focșani or Vârteșcoiu, where small 13th-century forts were excavated. The diocese was destroyed during the Mongol invasion of Europe in 1241.

== Demographics ==
Historical population
Year	Pop.	±%
2002	3,270	—
2011	2,995	−8.4%
2021	3,537	+18.1%
Source: Census data
