= Greabăn =

- Location within Romania

Location
- Country: Romania
- Counties: Buzău County
- Villages: Homești, Grebănu, Plevna, Poșta

Physical characteristics
- Source
  - coordinates: 45°25′40″N 26°56′45″E
  - elevation: 470 m (1,540 ft)
- Mouth: Râmnicul Sărat
  - location: Buzău County
  - coordinates: 45°22′58″N 27°02′08″E
  - elevation: 126 m (413 ft)
- Length: 14 km (8.7 mi)
- Basin size: 22 km^{2} (8.5 sq mi)

Basin features
- Progression: Râmnicul Sărat→ Siret→ Danube→ Black Sea
- Tributaries
  - right: Funduri

The Greabăn is a right tributary of the river Râmnicul Sărat in Romania. It discharges into the Râmnicul Sărat in the city Râmnicu Sărat. Its length is 14 km (8.7 mi) and its basin size is 22 km^{2} (8.5 sq mi).
