= Cătăuț =

- Location within Romania

Location
- Country: Romania
- Counties: Vrancea, Buzău
- Villages: Cătăuți, Alexandru Odobescu

Physical characteristics
- Source: Cătăuți, Vrancea County
  - coordinates: 45°32′35″N 26°48′46″E
  - elevation: 569 m (1,867 ft)
- Mouth: Râmnicul Sărat
  - location: Buda, Buzău County
  - coordinates: 45°29′59″N 26°54′47″E
  - elevation: 227 m (745 ft)
- Length: 11 km (6.8 mi)
- Basin size: 38 km^{2} (15 sq mi)

Basin features
- Progression: Râmnicul Sărat→ Siret→ Danube→ Black Sea
- Tributaries
  - right: Spidele

The Cătăuț is a right tributary of the river Râmnicul Sărat in Romania. It discharges into the Râmnicul Sărat in Buda. Its length is 11 km (6.8 mi) and its basin size is 38 km^{2} (15 sq mi).
