= Tulburea =

Tulburea may refer to several places in Romania:

- Tulburea, a village in Cozieni Commune, Buzău County
- Tulburea, a village in Predeal-Sărari Commune, Prahova County
- Tulburea, a village in Chiojdeni Commune, Vrancea County
- Tulburea, a tributary of the Ciobănuș in Bacău County
- Tulburea, a tributary of the Râmnicul Sărat in Vrancea County
- Tulburea, a tributary of the Uz in Bacău County
