= Mircea Dumitrescu =

- Born: September 3, 1926; Dumitrești, Vrancea County, Kingdom of Romania
- Died: March 11, 2005 (aged 78); Bucharest, Romania
- Resting place: Cemetery of St. Nicholas's Church, Dumitrești; 45°34′N 26°56′E
- Education: University of Bucharest
- Occupation: Professor
- Employer: Student's Culture House in Bucharest
- Known for: cinematography course
- Parent(s): Elena Șisman, Victor Dumitrescu

Mircea Dumitrescu (September 3, 1926 – March 11, 2005) was a film critic, professor and essayist. He was known especially for his cinematography course accompanied by screenings in the main university cities in Romania.

== Biography ==
Mircea Dumitrescu was born in Dumitrești, Vrancea County to Elena Șisman and Victor Dumitrescu (a physician), but he was brought up in Buzău. His father, Victor Dumitrescu, served at the "Carol I" Hospital in Dumitrești. Between 1934 and 1946, he studied in Buzău and Craiova (Liceul militar "Dimitrie A. Sturdza"), but Dumitrescu completed his high school just in the 1960s. He graduated from the University of Bucharest and worked for Student's Culture House in Bucharest (1970–2005). After 1970, he supported a cinematography course (focused on the history, theory and aesthetics of film) accompanied by screenings in the main university cities in Romania: Bucharest, Iași, Târgu Mureş, Cluj-Napoca, Timișoara, Craiova, Brașov. Mircea Dumitrescu was a member of the Romanian Filmmakers Union (1993).

After 1992, he wrote articles, reviews, and film essays for: "Tribuna" (Cluj-Napoca), "Timpul" (Iași), "Tribuna Ardealului" (Cluj-Napoca), "Alternativa" (Brașov), "Monitorul" (Iași), "Util Expres" (Brașov), "Transilvania Expres" (Brașov), "Argument" (Cluj-Napoca), "Cuvântul libertăţii" (Craiova), "Jurnal de Mureș" (Târgu Mureș), "Monitorul de Suceava" (Suceava), "Jurnal de Vrancea" (Focșani), "Biserica și problemele vremi" (Iași), "Tex–Caleidoscop" (Brașov), "Transilvania Jurnal" (Braşov), "Ideea creştină" (Iași), "Adevărul de Cluj" (Cluj-Napoca), "Gazeta de Transilvania" (Brașov), "Cotidianul – Week-end" (Bucharest), Revista Respiro. Mircea Dumitrescu collaborated with television stations TVS Holding (Brașov) and Europa Nova (Iași). Dumitrescu was a member of "Asociaţia Ziariștilor Români" after 1994.

In 2001, his book of essays, "Istoria cinematografiei universale," was published by Noesis editor Remus Cernea.

== Books ==
- Mircea Dumitrescu, "Istoria cinematografiei universale. Eseuri," vol. 1, Noesis Cultural Society, 2001, ISBN 973-8342-03-1
- Mircea Dumitrescu, "O privire critică asupra filmului românesc", ediție îngrijită și Cuvânt înainte de Mona Mamulea, Brașov, Arania, 2005, ISBN 9739153933 ISBN 9789739153935

== Online works ==
- (in Romanian) Istoria cinematografiei universale. Eseuri, vol. 1, Noesis, November 2001 ISBN 973-8342-03-1
- (in Romanian) Mircea Dumitrescu, "O privire critică asupra filmului românesc", Brașov, Arania, 2005 ISBN 9739153933 ISBN 9789739153935
