= Monteoru River =

Monteoru River can refer to one of the following rivers in Romania:

- Monteoru - headwater of the Sărățel in Vrancea County
- Monteoru - tributary of the Siriul Mare in Buzău County
- Valea Monteorului River

== See also ==
- Monteoru
