= Cerdac =

Cerdac may refer to several villages in Romania:

- Cerdac, a village in the town of Slănic-Moldova, Bacău County
- Cerdac, a village in Golești, Vrancea
