= Furu River =

Furu River may refer to:

- Furu, a tributary of the Jiul de Vest in Hunedoara County, Romania
- Furu, a tributary of the Sărățel in Vrancea County, Romania

== See also ==
- Furu, a Central Sudanic language of the Democratic Republic of the Congo
