= Siminoc =

Siminoc (“Helichrysum arenarium”) may refer to several villages in Romania:

- Siminoc, a village in Murfatlar town, Constanța County
- Siminoc, a village in Dumitrești Commune, Vrancea County
