= Dâlgov =

- Location within Romania

Location
- Country: Romania
- Counties: Vrancea County

Physical characteristics
- Mouth: Milcov
  - coordinates: 45.6738°N 27.1497°E
- Length: 18 km (11 mi)
- Basin size: 43 km^{2} (17 sq mi)

Basin features
- Progression: Milcov→ Putna→ Siret→ Danube→ Black Sea
- Tributaries
  - left: Mera

The Dâlgov is a right tributary of the river Milcov in Romania. It flows into the Milcov near Golești. Its length is 18 km (11 mi) and its basin size is 43 km^{2} (17 sq mi).
