= Gologanu =

- Commune
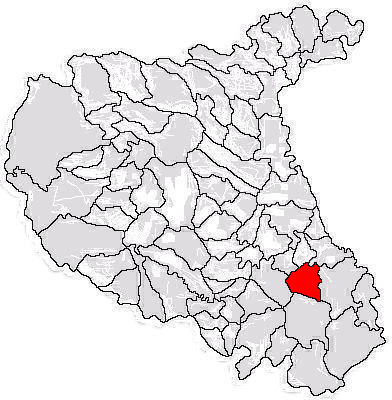
- Location in Vrancea County

- Location in Romania
- Coordinates: 45°37′N 27°16′E
- Country: Romania
- County: Vrancea

Government
  - Mayor (2024–2028): Neculai Riciu (PSD)
- Area: 39.81 km^{2} (15.37 sq mi)
- Elevation: 36 m (118 ft)
- Population (2021-12-01): 2,705
  - Density: 68/km^{2} (180/sq mi)
- Time zone: EET/EEST (UTC+2/+3)
- Postal code: 627206
- Area code: +(40) 237
- Vehicle reg.: VN
- Website: www.primariagologanu.ro

Gologanu is a commune located in Vrancea County, Romania. It is composed of a single village, Gologanu, and was part of Milcovul commune from 1968 until 2004, when it split off.

== Geography ==
The commune is located in the southeastern part of the county, on the banks of the river Râmna. Gologanu is crossed by national road DN23A, which connects it to the county seat, Focșani, 12 km (7.5 mi) to the northeast. It neighbors the following communes: Milcovul to the north, Tătăranu to the south, Răstoaca to the east, and Slobozia Ciorăști to the west.

== History ==
At the end of the 19th century, the commune was part of plasa Marginea de Sus of Râmnicu Sărat County; it consisted of the villages of Gologanu and Vlădulești, with a population of 1,570 inhabitants. A church built in 1859 and a school with 53 students established in 1880 functioned in the commune. The Socec yearbook recorded the commune in the same composition (the village of Vlădulești was then called Vlăduleasa), in plasa Cotești of the same county, with a population of 2,100 inhabitants. In 1950, the commune passed under the administration of the Focșani raion of the Putna Region; in 1952 it was moved to the Bârlad Region and in 1956 to the Galați Region. In 1968, it was transferred to Vrancea County, but it was immediately abolished and included in the Milcovul commune, while the village of Vlăduleasca was abolished and incorporated into the village of Gologanu. The commune was re-established in 2004, in its current structure.

Historical population
Year	Pop.	±%
2002	3,113	—
2011	3,040	−2.3%
2021	2,705	−11.0%
Source: Census data
