= Nicolae Tătăranu =

Romanian general

- Born: October 3, 1890; Măicănești, Kingdom of Romania
- Died: 13 May 1953 (aged 62); Bucharest, Romanian People's Republic
- Alma mater: Higher War School
- Military career
- Allegiance: Kingdom of Romania
- Branch: Royal Romanian Army
- Service years: 1908–1945
- Rank: Major General
- Commands: 20th Infantry Division; XI Army Corps
- Conflicts: World War I; World War II; Operation Barbarossa; Siege of Odessa; Battle of Stalingrad
- Awards: Order of the Star of Romania; Order of Michael the Brave; Knight's Cross of the Iron Cross

Nicolae Tătăranu (3 October 1890 – 13 May 1953) was a Romanian Major General during World War II. He was also a recipient of the Knight's Cross of the Iron Cross.

Tătăranu was born in Măicănești, a village în Râmnicu Sărat County, now in Vrancea County. In 1908 he enrolled in the School for Infantry Officers in Bucharest, graduating in 1910 with the rank of second lieutenant. After Romania entered World War I on the side of the Allies in August 1916, Tătăranu fought with the 2nd Battalion Vânători de munte, first as lieutenant, and then as captain. Wounded in his leg during fighting at Izvoru in November 1916, he was evacuated to the Școala Centrală's hospital in Bucharest, where he was operated on by Doctor Marius Nasta. After the city was occupied by German troops, he escaped but was caught in Ploiești and sent to jail. In May 1917, while on a train en route to an internment camp in Germany, he escaped again, together with two other fellow soldiers, and after a 210 km (130 mi) trek, mostly through the mountains, the three managed to cross the front line and rejoin the Romanian Army.

Following the end of World War One, Tătăranu attended the Higher War School (1921–1923). He served as military attaché in Paris from 1928 to 1931 as well as in Brussels (1929–1931) and Madrid (1930–1931). In 1935 he was promoted to colonel and in 1939 to brigadier general. In 1940 he published his World War I memoirs.

During World War II, Tătăranu took part in Operation Barbarossa. On 30 August 1941, Tătăranu signed in Tighina the Agreement Concerning Security, Administration and Economic Exploitation of the Territories between the Transnistria and Buh–Dnieper Region with General Major Arthur Hauffe. In late October 1941 while serving as deputy commander of the Romanian 10th Infantry Division, troops under his command took part in the Odessa massacre.

During the Battle of Stalingrad, Tătăranu served as commander of the Romanian 20th Infantry Division, which was part of the Romanian 6th Corps under the command of General Corneliu Dragalina. The 6th Corps troops received the brunt of the Soviet offensive (Operation Uranus) south of Stalingrad and suffered catastrophic losses. On orders from General Friedrich Paulus, Tătăranu flew out of the Stalingrad pocket on 13 January 1943, to report to Marshal Ion Antonescu on the dire situation of the Romanian troops trapped there.

On 28 March 1945, Tătăranu was put into retirement by the Petru Groza government.

== Awards ==
- Iron Cross, 2nd and 1st Class (1939)
- Order of the Star of Romania, Commander Class (8 June 1940)
- Order of Michael the Brave, 3rd Class (14 November 1941)
- War Victory Cross, 2nd Class (1941)
- Knight's Cross of the Iron Cross (17 December 1942)
