= Bălești =

Băleşti may refer to several places in Romania:

- Băleşti, a commune in Gorj County
- Băleşti, a commune in Vrancea County
- Băleşti, a village in Bistra Commune, Alba County
- Băleşti, a village in Cozmeşti Commune, Vaslui County
