= Rotăria River =

Rotăria River may refer to:

- Rotăria River (Tazlăul Mare), a tributary of the Tazlăul Mare River in Romania
- Rotăria River (Râmnicul Sărat), a tributary of the Râmnicul Sărat River in Romania
