= Bălan (river) =

- Location within Romania

Location
- Country: Romania
- Counties: Vrancea County
- Villages: Bordeasca Nouă, Bordeasca Veche

Physical characteristics
- Source
  - coordinates: 45°32′9″N 27°11′25″E
  - elevation: 60 m (200 ft)
- Mouth: Râmnicul Sărat
  - location: Bordeasca Veche
  - coordinates: 45°31′51″N 27°21′23″E
  - elevation: 35 m (115 ft)
- Length: 17 km (11 mi)
- Basin size: 56 km^{2} (22 sq mi)

Basin features
- Progression: Râmnicul Sărat→ Siret→ Danube→ Black Sea

The Bălan is a left tributary of the river Râmnicul Sărat in Romania. It discharges into the Râmnicul Sărat near Bordeasca Veche. Its length is 17 km (11 mi) and its basin size is 56 km^{2} (22 sq mi).
