= Podurile =

Podurile may refer to several villages in Romania:

- Podurile, a village in Drajna Commune, Prahova County
- Podurile, a village in Chiojdeni Commune, Vrancea County
