= Cerbu =

Cerbu ("stag, deer") may refer to several villages in Romania:

- Cerbu, a village in Bucium Commune, Alba County
- Cerbu, a village in Albota Commune, Argeș County
- Cerbu, a village in Copălău Commune, Botoşani County
- Cerbu, a village in Topolog Commune, Tulcea County
- Cerbu, a village in Jitia Commune, Vrancea County

== See also ==
- Cerbu River (disambiguation)
- The Golden Stag Festival, called Cerbul de Aur in Romanian
