= Bonțești =

Bonţeşti may refer to several villages in Romania:

- Bonţeşti, a village in Gurahonț Commune, Arad County
- Bonţeşti, a village in Cârligele Commune, Vrancea County
