= Jgheaburi =

Jgheaburi may refer to several villages in Romania:

- Jgheaburi, a village in Corbi Commune, Argeș County
- Jgheaburi, a village in Reghiu Commune, Vrancea County
