= Cerbu River =

Cerbu River may refer to:

- Cerbu, a tributary of the Gilort in Gorj County
- Cerbu River (Râmnicul Sărat)

== See also ==
- Cerbu (disambiguation)
- Cerboaia River (disambiguation)
