= Motnău =

River in Romania

- Location within Romania

Location
- Country: Romania
- Counties: Vrancea County
- Villages: Trestia, Siminoc, Motnău, Dumitreștii de Sus

Physical characteristics
- Source: Gurbăneasa Hill
  - coordinates: 45°39′48″N 26°46′24″E
  - elevation: 686 m (2,251 ft)
- Mouth: Râmnicul Sărat
  - location: Dumitrești
  - coordinates: 45°33′23″N 26°54′38″E
  - elevation: 289 m (948 ft)
- Length: 19 km (12 mi)
- Basin size: 56 km^{2} (22 sq mi)

Basin features
- Progression: Râmnicul Sărat→ Siret→ Danube→ Black Sea
- Tributaries
  - left: Motnăul Mic
  - right: Motnăul Puturos, Vulturu, Viforâta

The Motnău is a left tributary of the river Râmnicul Sărat in Romania. It discharges into the Râmnicul Sărat in Dumitrești. Its length is 19 km (12 mi) and its basin size is 56 km^{2} (22 sq mi).
