= Dumitrești =

- Commune
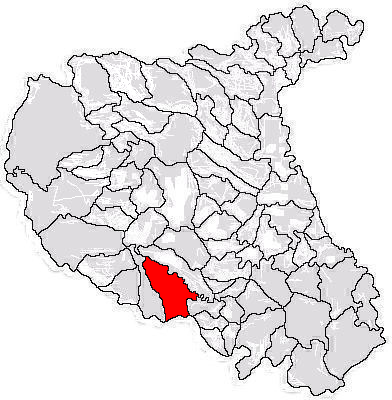
- Location in Vrancea County

- Location in Romania
- Coordinates: 45°34′N 26°56′E
- Country: Romania
- County: Vrancea

Government
  - Mayor (2024–2028): Adrian-Viorel Banaurs (PNL)
- Area: 85 km^{2} (33 sq mi)
- Elevation: 425 m (1,394 ft)
- Population (2021-12-01): 4,089
  - Density: 48/km^{2} (120/sq mi)
- Time zone: EET/EEST (UTC+2/+3)
- Postal code: 627110
- Area code: +(40) 237
- Vehicle reg.: VN
- Website: www.primaria-dumitresti.ro

Dumitrești is a commune located in Vrancea County, Romania. It is composed of sixteen villages: Biceștii de Jos, Biceștii de Sus, Blidari, Dumitrești, Dumitreștii de Sus, Dumitreștii-Față, Găloiești, Lăstuni, Lupoaia, Motnău, Poienița, Roșcari, Siminoc, Tinoasa, Trestia, and Valea Mică.

The commune lies on the banks of the river Râmnicul Sărat and its tributary, the Motnău. It is located in the southern part of the county, on the border with Buzău County. Dumitrești is traversed by national road DN2N, which connects it to the west to Chiojdeni and Jitia and to the east to Bordești, Dumbrăveni (where it intersects DN2), Sihlea, and Tătăranu.

A wayside cross in Poienița, built in 1936, commemorates the soldiers who died in World War I.

Historical population
Year	Pop.	±%
2002	5,278	—
2011	4,602	−12.8%
2021	4,089	−11.1%
Source: Census data

== Notable people ==
- Mircea Dumitrescu (1926–2005), film critic, professor, and essayist
