= Milcov (Siret) =

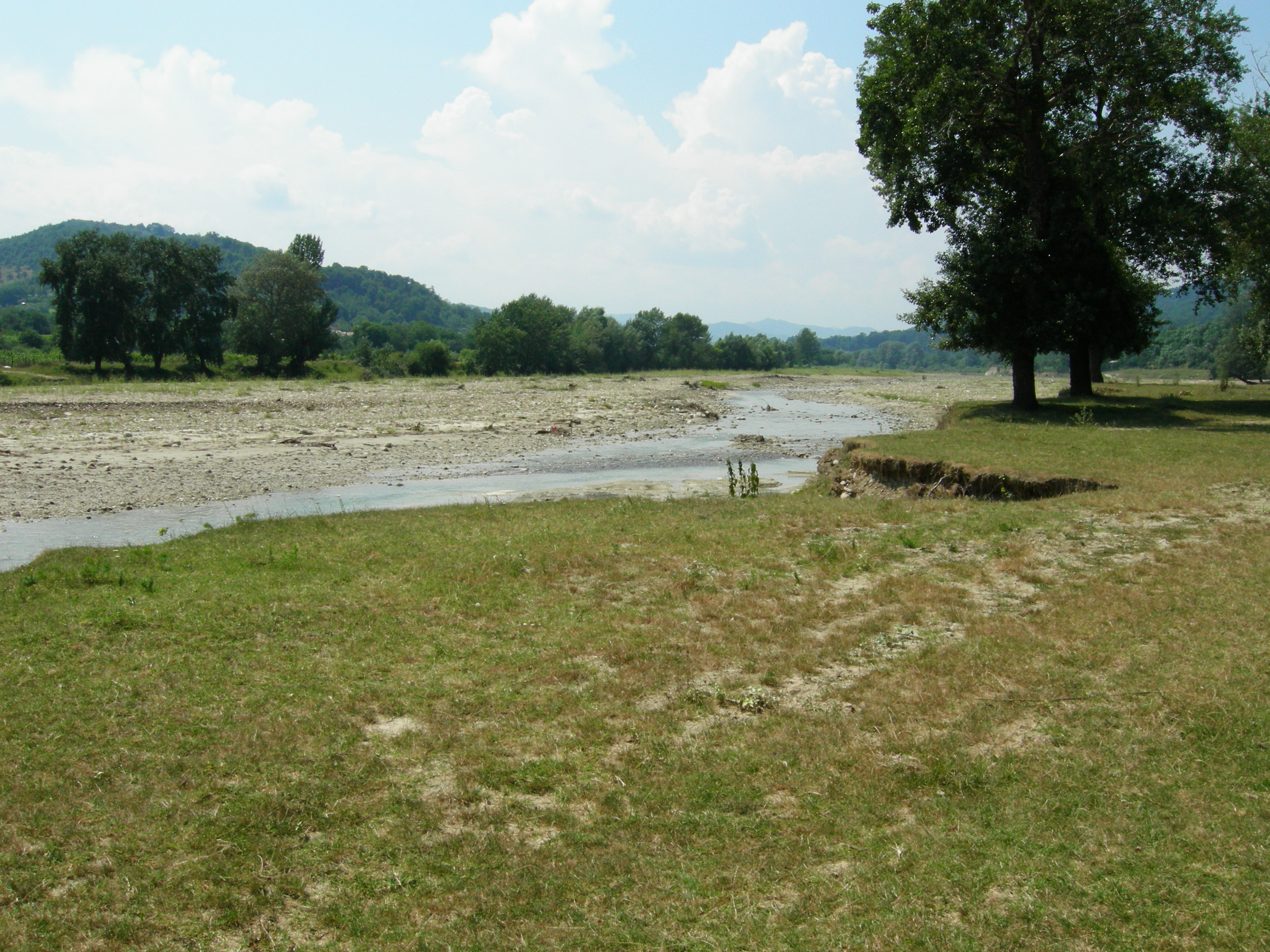
- Milcov near the village of Broșteni

- Location within Romania

Location
- Country: Romania
- Counties: Vrancea County

Physical characteristics
- Mouth: Putna
  - coordinates: 45.6626°N 27.3052°E
- Length: 79 km (49 mi)
- Basin size: 444 km^{2} (171 sq mi)

Basin features
- Progression: Putna→ Siret→ Danube→ Black Sea

The Milcov is a right tributary of the river Putna in Vrancea County, eastern Romania. It flows through the towns and villages Andreiașu de Jos, Șindrilari, Mera, Broșteni, Odobești, Vârteșcoiu, Câmpineanca, Golești, Milcovul (Risipiți until 1964) and Răstoaca. It discharges into the Putna at Răstoaca. Its length is 79 km (49 mi) and its basin size is 444 km^{2} (171 sq mi). The city of Focșani used to lie on it. Due to floods, however, a new riverbed formed a few kilometers south of the city.

In 1482, Stephen the Great declared the Milcov river as the boundary between his principality, Moldavia, and Wallachia to the south. In the 19th century, the river was perceived by unionists as a symbol of discord between Wallachia and Moldavia—see "Hora Unirii", a poem by Vasile Alecsandri. The Milcov border was dispensed with in 1859, when Wallachia and Moldavia came together to form the United Principalities.

== Tributaries ==
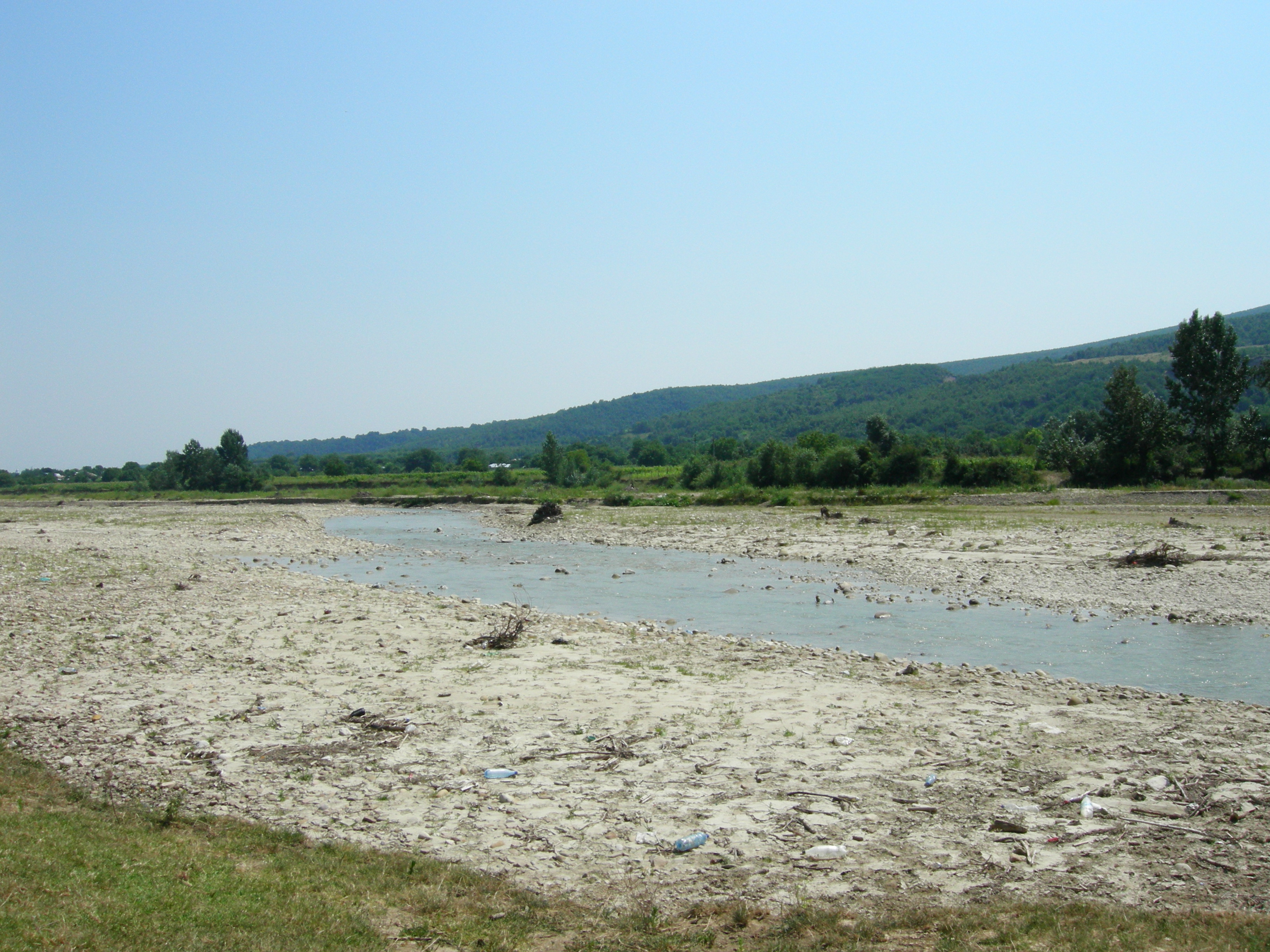
The Milcov Valley

The following rivers are tributaries to the river Milcov (from source to mouth):

- Left: Reghiu, Milcovel, Arva
- Right: Groza, Valea Rea, Valea Seacă, Pietroasa, Dălhăuți, Dâlgov
