= Reghiu (river) =

- Location within Romania

Location
- Country: Romania
- Counties: Vrancea County
- Villages: Reghiu

Physical characteristics
- Mouth: Milcov
  - location: Reghiu
  - coordinates: 45.7919°N 26.8542°E
- Length: 10 km (6.2 mi)
- Basin size: 28 km^{2} (11 sq mi)

Basin features
- Progression: Milcov→ Putna→ Siret→ Danube→ Black Sea

The Reghiu is a left tributary of the river Milcov in Romania. It flows into the Milcov in the village Reghiu. Its length is 10 km (6.2 mi) and its basin size is 28 km^{2} (11 sq mi).
