= Noesis Cultural Society =

The Noesis Cultural Society (Romanian Societatea Culturală Noesis) is a Romanian organization that produces and markets CD-ROM-based works pertaining to Romanian culture and thought. They are based in Bucharest, Romania. "Noesis" is an Ancient Greek word for "thought".

Founded in autumn 1998 by Remus Cernea, among their projects to date as of 2004 are "virtual encyclopedias" on Constantin Brâncuși, Nichita Stănescu, and I.L. Caragiale. They have also produced several "virtual anthologies" of contemporary Romanian artists, writers, and academics. Each of these anthologies has contained the equivalent of fifty ordinary books on a CD-ROM and has sold for a price comparable to a single book. This strategy is particularly interesting for a country where money is generally in short supply, but where most academics and intellectuals have access to computers.

== On-line books ==
- Istoria cinematografiei universale. Eseuri, vol. 1, Noesis, noiembrie 2001 ISBN 973-8342-03-1 (by Mircea Dumitrescu)
