= Sărățel (Râmnicul Sărat) =

- Location within Romania

Location
- Country: Romania
- Counties: Vrancea County
- Villages: Vintileasca, Cerbu

Physical characteristics
- Source: Muntele Furu
  - elevation: 1,220 m (4,000 ft)
- Mouth: Râmnicul Sărat
  - location: Upstream of Jitia
  - coordinates: 45°34′41″N 26°42′50″E
  - elevation: 511 m (1,677 ft)
- Length: 11 km (6.8 mi)
- Basin size: 34 km^{2} (13 sq mi)

Basin features
- Progression: Râmnicul Sărat→ Siret→ Danube→ Black Sea
- Tributaries
  - right: Furu

The Sărățel is a left tributary of the river Râmnicul Sărat in Romania. Upstream from its confluence with the Furu (Purcel), it is also called Monteoru. Its length is 11 km (6.8 mi) and its basin size is 34 km^{2} (13 sq mi). It discharges into the Râmnicul Sărat near Jitia.
