= Dălhăuți =

- Location within Romania

Location
- Country: Romania
- Counties: Vrancea County
- Villages: Dălhăuți

Physical characteristics
- Mouth: Milcov
  - coordinates: 45.6950°N 27.1257°E
- Length: 12 km (7.5 mi)
- Basin size: 14 km^{2} (5.4 sq mi)

Basin features
- Progression: Milcov→ Putna→ Siret→ Danube→ Black Sea

The Dălhăuți is a right tributary of the river Milcov in Romania. It flows into the Milcov near Câmpineanca. Its length is 12 km (7.5 mi) and its basin size is 14 km^{2} (5.4 sq mi).
