= Cârligele =

- Commune
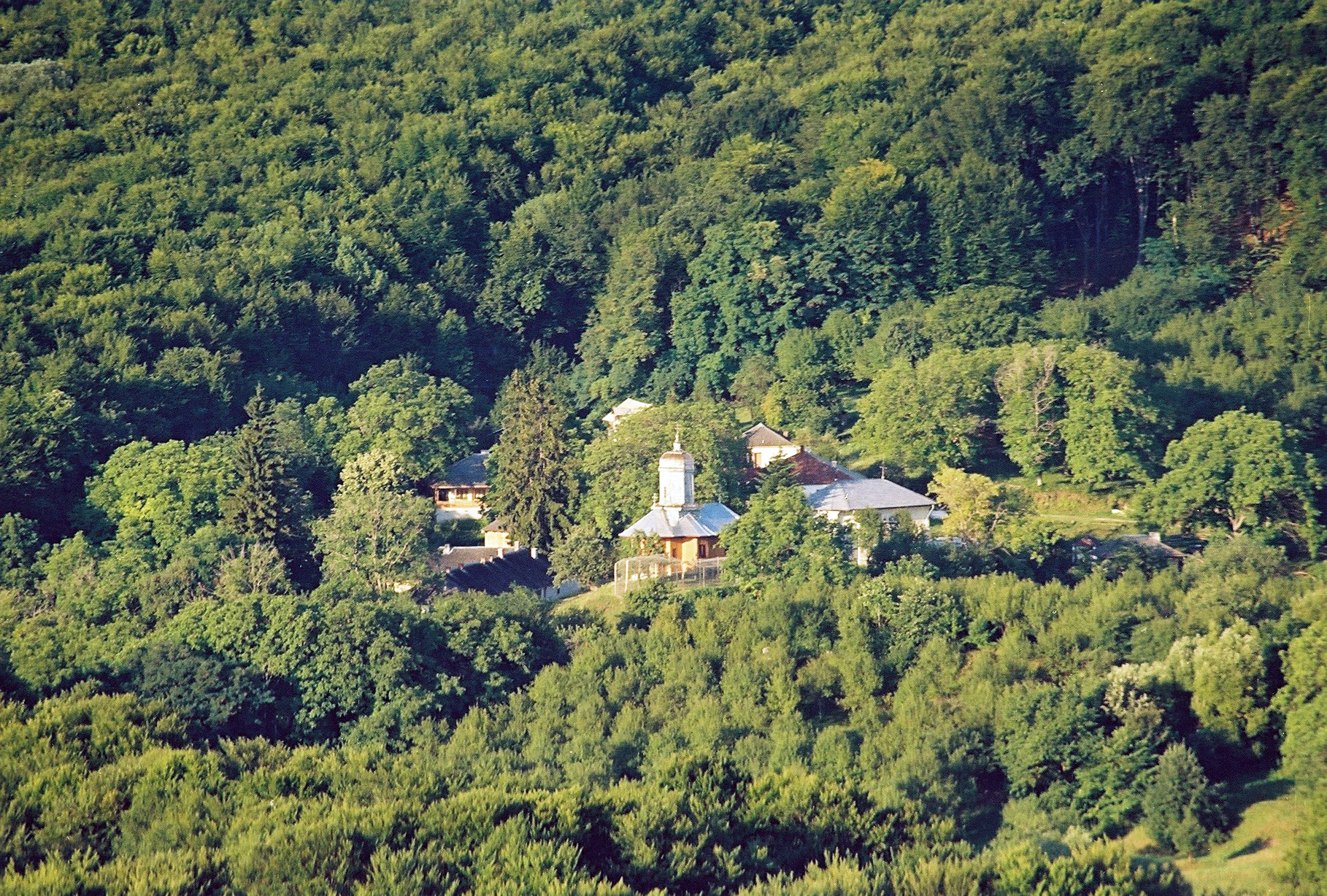
- The Dălhăuți Monastery

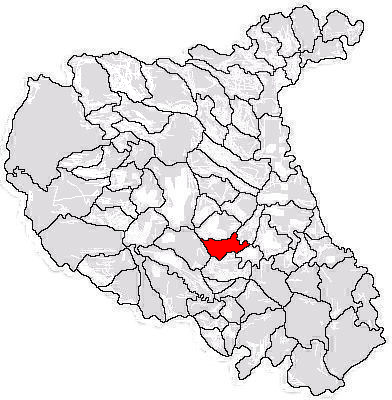
- Location in Vrancea County

- Location in Romania
- Coordinates: 45°41′N 27°6′E
- Country: Romania
- County: Vrancea

Government
  - Mayor (2024–2028): Ștefan Moscu (PSD)
- Area: 40 km^{2} (15 sq mi)
- Elevation: 154 m (505 ft)
- Population (2021-12-01): 3,378
  - Density: 84/km^{2} (220/sq mi)
- Time zone: UTC+02:00 (EET)
  - Summer (DST): UTC+03:00 (EEST)
- Postal code: 627065
- Area code: +40 x37
- Vehicle reg.: VN
- Website: www.primariacirligele.ro

Cârligele is a commune located in Vrancea County, Muntenia, Romania. It is composed of four villages: Blidari, Bonțești, Cârligele, and Dălhăuți.

The commune is located in the south-central part of Vrancea County, 12 km (7.5 mi) west of the county seat, Focșani. It lies on the southern bank of the river Dălhăuți, itself a right tributary of the Milcov River. During the interwar period, Cârligele belonged to the plasa Orașul of Râmnicu Sărat County.

The Dălhăuți Monastery dates back to the 15th century. It is located in the middle of beech and oak forests on Deleanu Hill, a few kilometers west of the village of Dălhăuți. A wayside cross in Cârligele, built in 1933, commemorates the soldiers who died in World War I.

Historical population
| Year | Pop. | ±% |
|---|---|---|
| 2002 | 2,927 | — |
| 2011 | 3,116 | +6.5% |
| 2021 | 3,378 | +8.4% |
Source: Census data

== Natives ==
- Nicolae Doicaru (1922–1990), Securitate General, director of the Extern Intelligence Service from 1959 to 1971
