= Remus Cernea =

Romanian politician (born 1974)

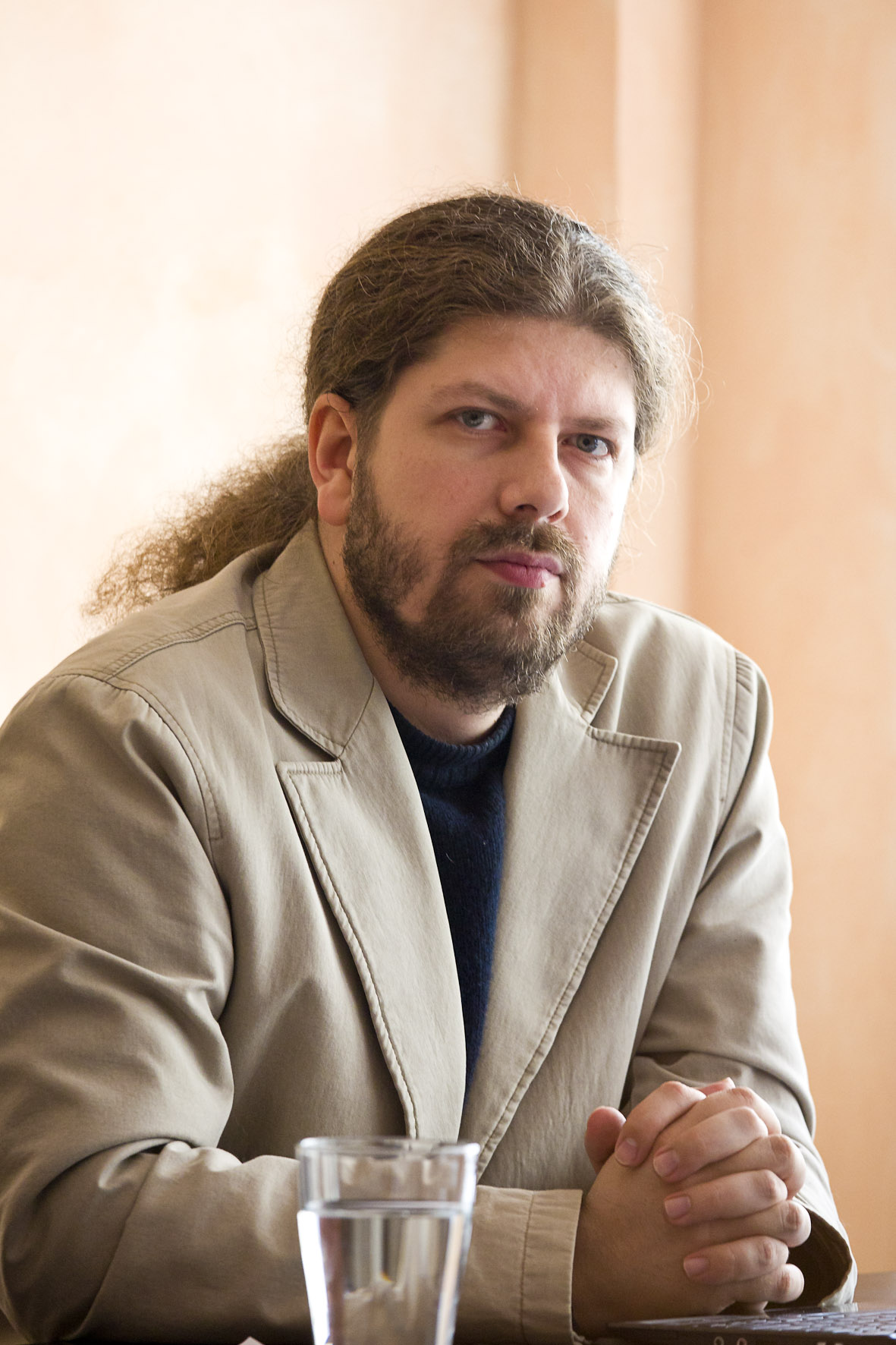
- Cernea in 2011

Green Party (2007–2010, 2012–?) candidate for President of Romania
- Opponent(s): Gigi Becali, Crin Antonescu, Mircea Geoană, and others
- Incumbent: Remus Cernea

Personal details
- Born: 25 June 1974 (age 51) Bucharest, Socialist Republic of Romania (now Romania)
- Party: Green Party (2007–2010, 2012–?)
- Other political affiliations: Green Movement (2010–2012)
- Website: http://www.remuscernea.ro/

Remus Florinel Cernea (Romanian pronunciation: [ˈremus ˈt͡ʃerne̯a]; born 25 June 1974) is a Romanian activist against discrimination based on faith and religion, an advocate of the separation of church and state and the founder of the Solidarity for Freedom of Conscience Association. From 2012 to 2016, he served as a member of the Chamber of Deputies. He was also president of the Green Party (PV).

He ran in the 2009 Romanian presidential election, and was a candidate for Green Party (PV), gaining over 60,000 votes, or a share of 0.62% of the votes. In October 2010, he left the Green Party over ideological differences and created the Green Movement (Romanian: Mișcarea Verzilor).

== Biography ==
Born in Bucharest, he lived in Hunedoara for 14 years, where his father worked as a geologist, then moved back to Bucharest in 1988. In 1998, he founded the Noesis Cultural Society, an organization which edited the first Romanian e-books and multimedia encyclopedias dedicated to subjects of the Romanian culture: a CD-ROM containing 50 e-books and encyclopedias about Ion Luca Caragiale and Constantin Brâncuși. These projects earned the Noesis Society the prize for the best educational product (2002 edition) given by the Presidency of Romania.

Cernea studied Philosophy at the University of Bucharest (UB) but he did not graduate.

In 2003, he founded the Association "Solidarity for Freedom of Conscience", a secularist and humanist organization which militates for freedom of thought, separation of church and state and against discrimination based on faith and religion.

Cernea published in 2007 a book of essays and articles named "Manifest împotriva becalizării României" (A Manifest Against the Becalization of Romania), in which he argues that the "Becalization" (derived from the name of Gigi Becali, a nationalist politician who stresses his allegiance to the Romanian Orthodox Church) is threatening the values of an open society.

== Views ==
Cernea argues that in Romania there is an "unacceptable collusion between the politicians and the Church", and that although officially there is a separation of Church and state, practically, the Romanian Orthodox Church and the state are "intimately linked". He considers himself a "freethinker", which he describes as being more encompassing than the term of "atheist", considering the term of atheist a bit too limited and wanting to retain an "area of speculation and openness".

His 2009 electoral platform was based on 10 points which he details on his blog and include: supporting conciliation and dialog within the Romanian society, supporting human rights and fight against discrimination, closer ties with Romania's neighbours, supporting green technologies, sustainable development, and green agriculture, increase in funding for education and research to 10% of the Romanian GDP, freer election system that is more fair to smaller parties, full separation of church and state and a national dialog on social issues such as legalization of prostitution, the problem of drugs and the recognition of heterosexual and homosexual civil unions.

== Political activity ==
In 1997, as a protest toward the nationalism found in Romanian politics, Cernea joined the ethnic Hungarian party, the Democratic Alliance of Hungarians in Romania (UDMR/RMDSZ), despite being ethnically Romanian.

Cernea announced his intention to run as a Green Party candidate in the January 17, 2010 by-election for the Romanian Chamber of Deputies seat (in the Sector 1 of Bucharest), vacated after the appointment of Bogdan Olteanu as deputy governor of the National Bank, however, the Bucharest Central Municipal Bureau rejected his candidature, because he is not a member of a parliamentary party, as the law requires in case of a by-election. The appeal of the decision and of the constitutionality of the law were rejected and Cernea announced he wants to dispute the law at the European Court of Human Rights.

=== 2009 Presidential election ===
In August 2009, Cernea announced his intention of running for presidency as a candidate of the Green Party (PV). He and the Green Party gathered the needed 200,000 signatures and submitted them to Electoral Bureau on the last day before the beginning of the electoral campaign, October 23, 2008.

In an interview for Evenimentul Zilei, Cernea said that he wants to offer an alternative to the mainstream politics and he tries to attract the 60-70% of the voters who are disappointed by the politicians and do not want to go to the polls. Although Cernea tried to obtain a debate, no candidate from the top three parties accepted a debate involving him.

Cernea's political campaign was especially visible on the Internet, having the most Facebook supporters of all the candidates. He says that unlike the top candidates' campaigns, his campaign was exclusively based on the enthusiasm of some young volunteers who helped him purely through pro-bono work.

Cernea was the 8th out of 12 candidates, gaining 60,539 votes, or a share of 0.62%. The highest percentages were in the Bucharest sectors 3 (1.13%) and 6 (1.04%), Cluj County (0.9%) and among the voters abroad (1.0%).

=== Member of Parliament ===
Cernea ran in the 2012 Romanian legislative election on the center-left Social Liberal Union (USL) ticket in a constituency in Constanța County, being one of the three candidates of the Green Party (PV) in the elections. He won the district, having 20,565 votes (57.23%).

=== Law proposals ===
==== Church financing reform ====
In April 2013, Cernea announced that he is preparing a law proposal that would cut the state financing of churches from the state budget and institute a church tax similar to the one in Germany. Prime Minister Ponta announced that the USL coalition does not support his proposal and his proposal was met with opposition. Mayor of Constanța, Radu Mazăre, called him "an idiot" and said that he'll "break his legs" if Cernea comes to Constanța. Gigi Becali called him a "satanist" and argued that Cernea should be sent to an insane asylum or to prison.

The Romanian Orthodox Church reacted to Cernea's proposal through a press release in which they argued that the state assumed an obligation in 1863 following the Secularization of monastery estates and that the proposal is "unrealistic and inadequate for today's Romania" and that it would create a "crisis in the relationship between the state and religious organizations".

==== Same-sex civil unions ====
Also in April 2013, Cernea announced that he intends to propose the legalization of civil unions for both same-sex and opposite-sex couples.

Cernea introduced a bill for same-sex civil unions, which was defeated in Parliament on 17 December 2015.

=== Electoral history ===
==== Presidential elections ====
Election	Affiliation	First round			Second round		
Election	Affiliation	Votes	Percentage	Position	Votes	Percentage	Position
2009	Green Party	60,539	0.62%	8th			

== Campaigns as activist ==
=== Church in the University courtyard ===
In 1998, the Philosophy and Law departments of the University of Bucharest (UB) shared a building and in its courtyard, it was decided to build a church. After the place was hallowed, Cernea, who was studying philosophy at the University, together with three other students, wrote a letter of protest, organized a conference about the subject and gathered 150 signatures against the building of the church. The Association of Christian Orthodox students gathered a list of 3,000 signatures supporting the building of the church.

As the scandal was booming, the rector decided to defuse it by banning any conference on the subject. The project of the building of the church was cancelled and the Orthodox icons in the University classrooms were removed.

=== Icons in schools ===
According to Cernea, following the fall of Nicolae Ceauşescu, in schools, his portraits were replaced with Romanian Orthodox icons. In 2005, Emil Moise, a philosophy teacher from Buzău began a campaign against the display of religious items in schools. Cernea's association supported his case for the removal of icons from schools, arguing that the religious symbols represent a discrimination against non-Orthodox children and an infringement against the neutrality of the state. Additionally, as 90% of the schools held religious services, Cernea argued that this practice was also illegal, as the Romanian penal code bans forcing anyone to participate to any religious ceremony.

The movement against icons in schools generated a large debate in the Romanian society and media. In CNCD Decision 323/2006, the National Council for Combating Discrimination ruled that the display of religious icons was discriminatory. However, the Ministry of Education argued that it cannot remove the icons because they were not the ones who put them there in the first place and that local communities should decide whether to keep the icons or not.

=== Romanian People Salvation Cathedral ===
The Romanian People Salvation Cathedral is a large-scale cathedral construction project envisioned by the Romanian Orthodox Church. The government of Romania originally wanted the cathedral to be built it in the place of Carol Park, but following protests, including those organized by the Solidarity for Freedom of Conscience Association, it changed the plans.

Finally, in 2007, the state gave the Orthodox Church about 11 hectares of land in central Bucharest, next to the Palace of the Parliament and it promised it will pay partly the construction costs. Cernea argued that both the donation of the terrain and giving the additional funds represent a misuse of state funds and is illegal.

The Solidarity for Freedom of Conscience Association also contested the name "Romanian People Salvation Cathedral", arguing that it has nationalistic overtones, by linking being Romanian to affiliation to the Orthodox Church.

=== School curriculum ===
In 2007, Cernea's association announced that the new curriculum of Romania had quietly removed the requirement of teaching Charles Darwin's Theory of Evolution from biology textbooks, as well as the debate on the existence of God (the study of Voltaire, Camus, and Nietzsche), from philosophy textbooks.

Cernea argues that the current curriculum lacks the scientific and philosophical points of view, but in the same time, in religion classes, the seven-day creationism is taught, distorting the children's understanding of how the world came into being.

In February 2008, his association asked the Ministry of Education to re-introduce explicitly the theory of evolution in the biology curriculum, arguing that Romania is the only European country in which it is not studied in detail and organized a protest in front of the headquarters of the Ministry of Education for the reintroduction of evolution in the curriculum.

In a 2009 interview for Dilema Veche, Cernea says that there are not only textbooks that do not describe evolution, but there are some approved textbooks that teach creationism. He argues that the school curriculum is particularly important, since it influences the high school students' choice of university study and that this is why in Romania there's a huge number of those studying theology, with a dwindling number of students studying sciences.

=== Other initiatives ===
In 2006, the association organized a concert against the new law regulating religion in Romania, which banned "religious defamation". In the concert participated Luna Amară, Vama, Sarmalele Reci among others. In May 2007, he organized a small-scale protest against president Traian Băsescu's racist and sexist affirmations, and in August 2007, the association argued against the practice at the national radio station of beginning the programme with a reading of Lord's Prayer.

In August 2009, he protested against a law project made by the Romanian Government, which would have increased the number of signatures needed for running in the presidential elections to 500,000 and also required a €300,000 sum to be paid as a bail, only to be returned if the candidate gets a certain percentage. Cernea argued that this breaks the free and fair election standards found in Code of Good Practice in Electoral Matters of the Council of Europe and that it would monopolize the elections to those "rich and corrupt". Prime Minister Emil Boc, however, announced that the law project would be dropped.

In May 2010, Remus Cernea is taking part, along with other high-ranking members from the Green Party (PV) at the GayFest, the annual gay pride festival of Bucharest.

Remus Cernea declared that he will candidate for the forthcoming 2024 Romanian presidential election in an effort to counteract the political extremism in Romania.

== Books ==
- Remus Cernea, Manifest împotriva becalizării României ISBN 978-973-733-192-2, Tritonic 2007
