= Ziduri =

- Commune
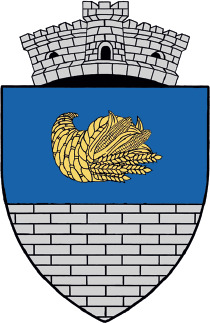
- Coat of arms

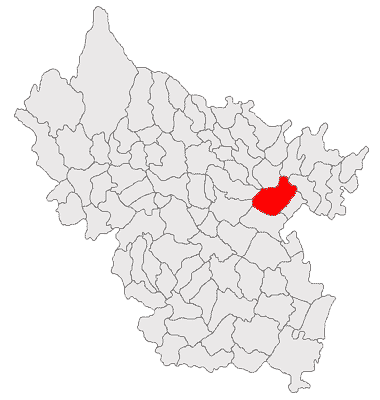
- Location in Buzău County

- Location in Romania
- Coordinates: 45°18′N 27°5′E
- Country: Romania
- County: Buzău
- Subdivisions: Costieni, Cuculeasa, Heliade Rădulescu, Lanurile, Ziduri, Zoița

Government
  - Mayor (2020–2024): Viorel Buzea (PRO)
- Area: 85.88 km^{2} (33.16 sq mi)
- Elevation: 74 m (243 ft)
- Population (2021-12-01): 3,476
  - Density: 40/km^{2} (100/sq mi)
- Time zone: EET/EEST (UTC+2/+3)
- Postal code: 127720
- Area code: +(40) 238
- Vehicle reg.: BZ
- Website: primariaziduribz.ro

Ziduri is a commune in Buzău County, Muntenia, Romania. It is composed of six villages: Costieni, Cuculeasa, Heliade Rădulescu, Lanurile, Ziduri, and Zoița.

Historical population
Year	Pop.	±%
2002	4,800	—
2011	4,402	−8.3%
2021	3,476	−21.0%
Source: Census data
