= Pelinei =

- Village
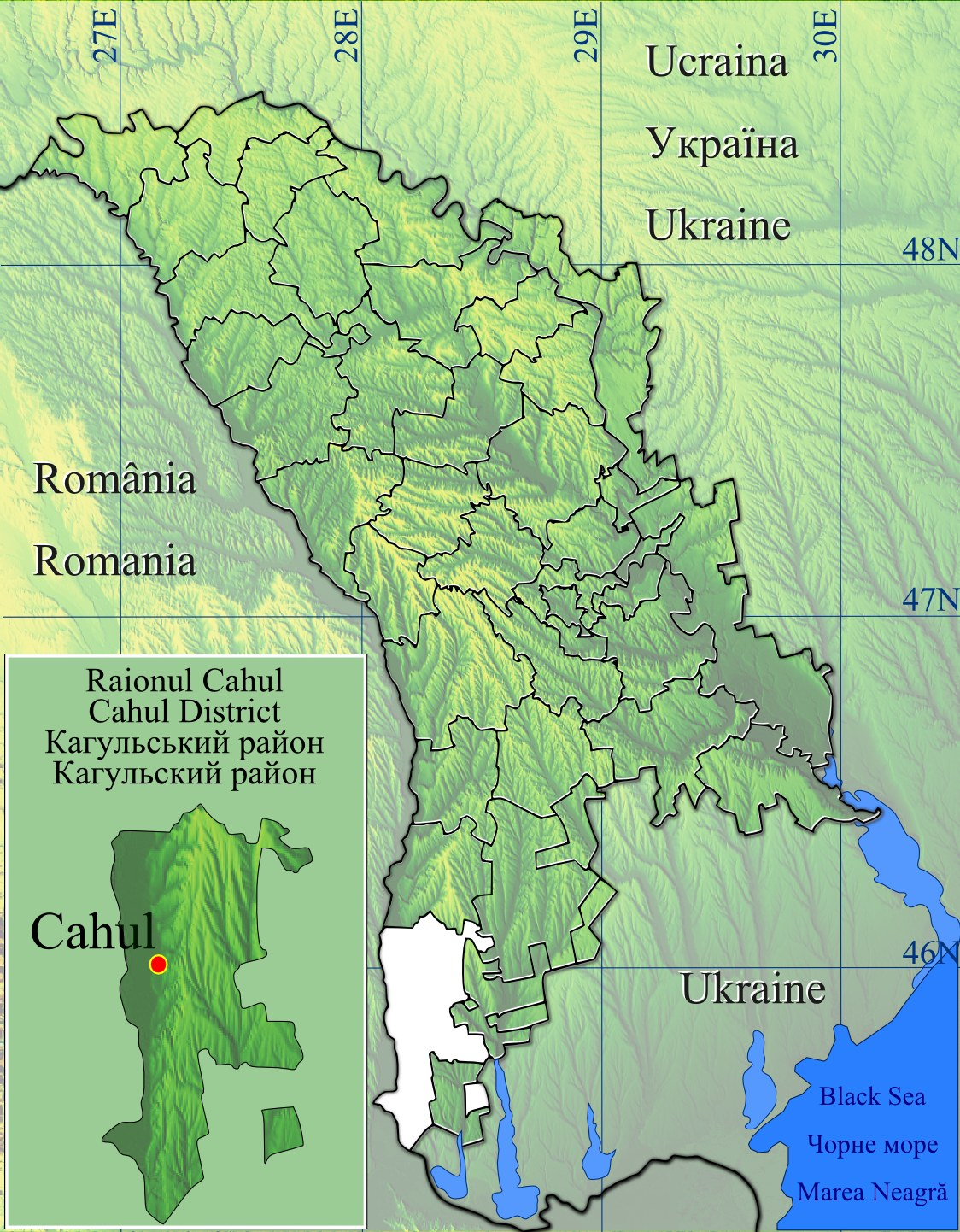
- Location within Cahul
- Coordinates: 45°49′29″N 28°19′25″E
- Country: Moldova
- District: Pelinei

Population (2014)
  - Total: 2,183
- Time zone: UTC+2 (EET)
  - Summer (DST): UTC+3 (EEST)
- Postal code: MD-3927

Pelinei is a commune in Cahul District, Moldova. It is composed of two villages, Pelinei and Sătuc.
