= Reghiu =

- Commune
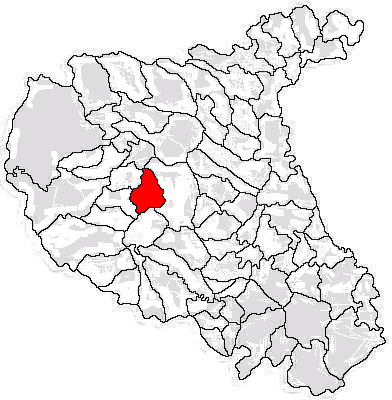
- Location in Vrancea County

- Location in Romania
- Coordinates: 45°47′N 26°51′E
- Country: Romania
- County: Vrancea

Government
  - Mayor (2024–2028): Cătălin-Georgel Valisăreanu (PSD)
- Area: 66.39 km^{2} (25.63 sq mi)
- Elevation: 330 m (1,080 ft)
- Population (2021-12-01): 2,039
  - Density: 31/km^{2} (80/sq mi)
- Time zone: EET/EEST (UTC+2/+3)
- Postal code: 627285
- Area code: +(40) 237
- Vehicle reg.: VN
- Website: www.reghiu.primarievn.ro

Reghiu is a commune located in Vrancea County, Romania. It is composed of eight villages: Farcaș, Jgheaburi, Piscu Reghiului, Răiuți, Reghiu, Șindrilari, Ursoaia, and Valea Milcovului.

== Geography ==
The commune is located in the central-west part of the county, 32 km (20 mi) from the county seat, Focșani, in a hilly area at the foot of the Curvature Carpathians. It lies on the banks of the Milcov River, the traditional boundary between Wallachia and Moldavia; the Reghiu River flows into the Milcov in the village Reghiu. It is crossed by the national road DN2M, which connects it to the south with Andreiașu de Jos and Nereju, and to the east with Mera, Broșteni, Odobești, and Focșani (where it ends in DN2D).

== History ==
At the end of the 19th century, the villages and the current territory of the commune were part of the neighboring communes of Mera and Năruja. The Socec yearbook from 1924 records the appearance of Reghiu commune in plasa Gârlele of Putna County, with 2,053 inhabitants in the villages of Andriași and Reghiu. In 1931, the commune took its current form, comprising at the time the villages of Farcaș, Jgheaburi, Pârlita, Răiuț, Reghiu, Ursoaia, Valea Boului, and Valea Milcovului.

In 1950, the commune was transferred to the Năruja raion of Putna Region; two years later it became part of the Focșani raion of Bârlad Region, and in 1956 it was transferred to the Galați Region. The village of Valea Boului took the name of Piscu Reghiului in 1964. In 1968, Reghiu became part of Vrancea County, in its present form.

== Demographics ==
Historical population
Year	Pop.	±%
2002	2,657	—
2011	2,126	−20.0%
2021	2,039	−4.1%
Source: Census data

According to the 2011 census, the commune had a population of 2,126, of which 98.12% were ethnic Romanians. At the 2021 census, Reghiu had a population of 2,039, of which 94.26% were Romanians.
