= Râmnicelu, Brăila =

Râmnicelu
- Commune
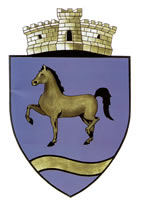
- Coat of arms

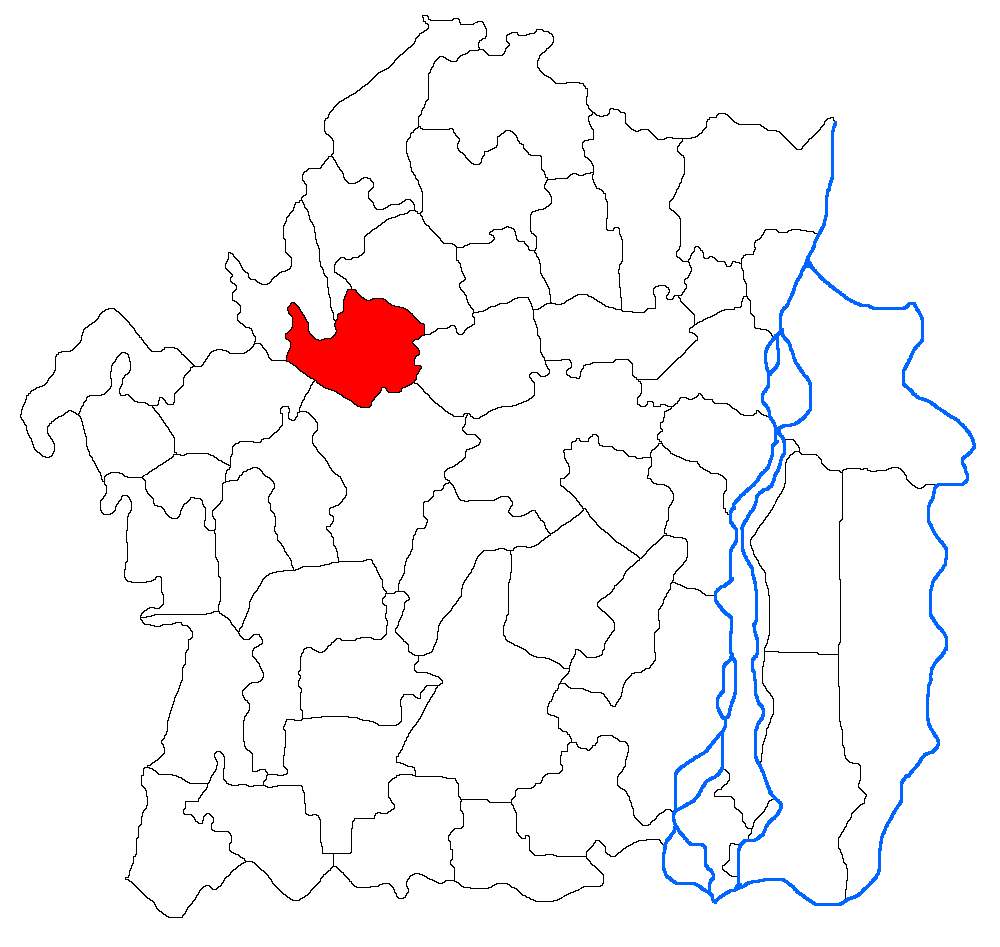
- Location in Brăila County

- Location in Romania
- Coordinates: 45°17′N 27°32′E
- Country: Romania
- County: Brăila

Government
  - Mayor (2020–2024): Lucian Chiru (PSD)
- Area: 23.2 km^{2} (9.0 sq mi)
- Population (2021-12-01): 1,846
  - Density: 79.6/km^{2} (206/sq mi)
- Time zone: UTC+02:00 (EET)
  - Summer (DST): UTC+03:00 (EEST)
- Postal code: 817110
- Vehicle reg.: BR
- Website: www.primariarimnicelu.ro

Râmnicelu is a commune located in Brăila County, Muntenia, Romania. It has four villages: Boarca, Constantinești, Mihail Kogălniceanu (formerly Domnița), and Râmnicelu.

The commune is situated in the upper reaches of the Bărăgan Plain. It lies on both banks of the Buzău River, with Râmnicelu on the southern side and the three other villages on the northern side, connected by a bridge in Boarca.

Râmnicelu is located in the northwestern part of the county, 25 km (16 mi) north of the town of Ianca and 35 km (22 mi) west of the county seat, the city of Brăila. County road DJ221, which runs from Brăila to Iancu, passes through Râmnicelu village.

Its neighbors are the following communes: Scorțaru Nou to the northeast, Gemenele to the east, Movila Miresii to the south, Șuțești to the southwest, and Racovița to the west and northwest.

At the 2011 census, 86.11% of inhabitants were Romanians and 11.57% Roma.

Much of the phreatic zone under Râmnicelu is contaminated with nitrates and nitrites, which are chemicals that cannot be eliminated by boiling the water from wells.

== Climate ==
It was in Ion Sion, part of Râmnicelu, that on 10 August 1951, Romania's hottest temperature on record, 44.5 °C (112.1 °F), was observed.

Climate data for Râmnicelu (elevation 26 m, 2001–2025 normals, extremes 2001–present)
Month	Jan	Feb	Mar	Apr	May	Jun	Jul	Aug	Sep	Oct	Nov	Dec	Year
Record high °C (°F)	18.2 (64.8)	23.3 (73.9)	26.6 (79.9)	31.7 (89.1)	35.3 (95.5)	38.8 (101.8)	41.0 (105.8)	44.5 (112.1)	37.0 (98.6)	33.0 (91.4)	25.4 (77.7)	18.6 (65.5)	44.5 (112.1)
Mean daily maximum °C (°F)	3.6 (38.5)	6.3 (43.3)	12.6 (54.7)	18.6 (65.5)	24.4 (75.9)	28.7 (83.7)	31.2 (88.2)	31.3 (88.3)	25.7 (78.3)	18.4 (65.1)	11.1 (52.0)	5.0 (41.0)	18.1 (64.5)
Daily mean °C (°F)	0.0 (32.0)	2.1 (35.8)	7.2 (45.0)	12.4 (54.3)	17.9 (64.2)	22.2 (72.0)	24.5 (76.1)	24.4 (75.9)	19.2 (66.6)	12.9 (55.2)	7.2 (45.0)	1.6 (34.9)	12.6 (54.8)
Mean daily minimum °C (°F)	−3.6 (25.5)	−2.2 (28.0)	1.8 (35.2)	6.2 (43.2)	11.4 (52.5)	15.8 (60.4)	17.8 (64.0)	17.4 (63.3)	12.7 (54.9)	7.4 (45.3)	3.2 (37.8)	−1.7 (28.9)	7.2 (44.9)
Record low °C (°F)	−22.0 (−7.6)	−21.4 (−6.5)	−12.9 (8.8)	−4.5 (23.9)	2.5 (36.5)	7.5 (45.5)	10.7 (51.3)	8.0 (46.4)	−0.2 (31.6)	−4.2 (24.4)	−7.4 (18.7)	−21.8 (−7.2)	−22.0 (−7.6)
Average precipitation mm (inches)	33 (1.3)	24 (0.9)	32 (1.3)	38 (1.5)	54 (2.1)	69 (2.7)	54 (2.1)	39 (1.5)	39 (1.5)	50 (2.0)	39 (1.5)	38 (1.5)	509 (19.9)
Average precipitation days (≥ 1.0 mm)	6	5	5	7	9	10	8	5	5	5	6	6	77
Source: Administrația Națională de Meteorologie (MeteoRomania), CC-BY-SA-4.0
