= Grebănu =

- Commune
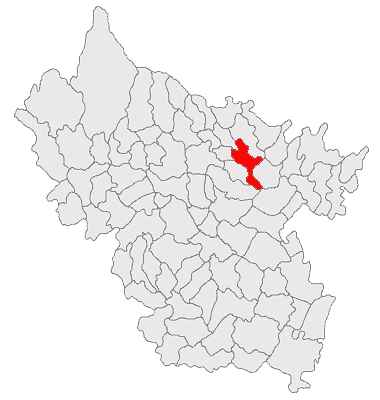
- Location in Buzău County

- Location in Romania
- Coordinates: 45°22′40″N 26°58′40″E
- Country: Romania
- County: Buzău
- Subdivisions: Grebănu, Homești, Livada Mare, Livada Mică, Plevna, Zăplazi

Government
  - Mayor (2020–2024): Gheorghe Stanciu (PSD)
- Area: 57.37 km^{2} (22.15 sq mi)
- Elevation: 220 m (720 ft)
- Population (2021-12-01): 5,144
  - Density: 89.66/km^{2} (232.2/sq mi)
- Time zone: EET/EEST (UTC+2/+3)
- Postal code: 127270
- Area code: +(40) 238
- Vehicle reg.: BZ
- Website: grebanu.ro

Grebănu is a commune in Buzău County, Muntenia, Romania. It is composed of six villages: Grebănu, Homești, Livada, Livada Mică, Plevna, and Zăplazi.

Historical population
Year	Pop.	±%
2002	5,531	—
2011	5,319	−3.8%
2021	5,144	−3.3%
Source: Census data

== Natives ==
- Pimen Zainea (1929 – 2020), Orthodox Archbishop of Suceava and Rădăuți (1991 – 2020)
