= Măicănești =

- Commune
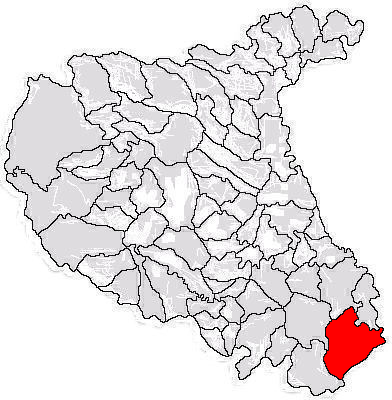
- Location in Vrancea County

- Location in Romania
- Coordinates: 45°30′N 27°30′E
- Country: Romania
- County: Vrancea

Government
  - Mayor (2024–2028): Răzvan Adrian Pascu (PNL)
- Area: 145 km^{2} (56 sq mi)
- Elevation: 15 m (49 ft)
- Population (2021-12-01): 3,826
  - Density: 26/km^{2} (68/sq mi)
- Time zone: EET/EEST (UTC+2/+3)
- Postal code: 627190
- Area code: +(40) 237
- Vehicle reg.: VN
- Website: primariamaicanesti.ro

Măicănești is a commune located in Vrancea County, Romania. It is composed of six villages: Belciugele, Măicănești, Râmniceni, Slobozia Botești, Stupina, and Tătaru.

Historical population
Year	Pop.	±%
2002	5,295	—
2011	4,612	−12.9%
2021	3,826	−17.0%
Source: Census data

== Natives ==
Nicolae Tătăranu (1890–1953), Major General during World War II
