= Vintileasca =

- Commune
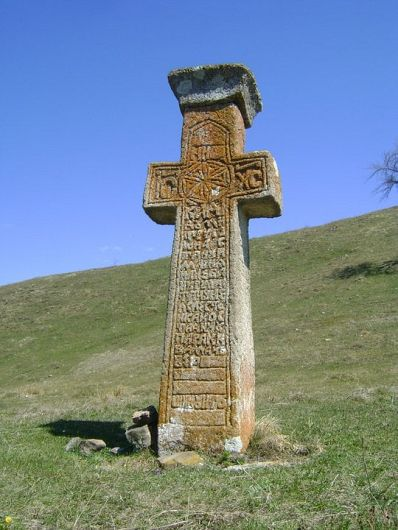
- World War I heroes monument in Vintileasca

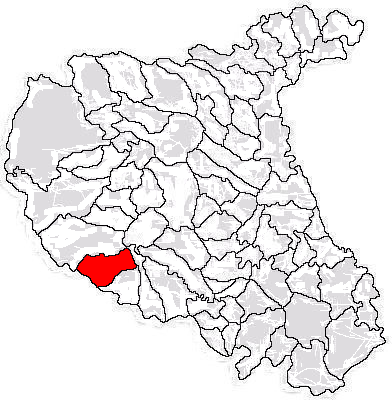
- Location in Vrancea County

- Location in Romania
- Coordinates: 45°36′30″N 26°42′20″E
- Country: Romania
- County: Vrancea

Government
  - Mayor (2024–2028): Tudorel Vâlcociu (PSD)
- Area: 63.01 km^{2} (24.33 sq mi)
- Elevation: 786 m (2,579 ft)
- Population (2021-12-01): 1,724
  - Density: 27.36/km^{2} (70.86/sq mi)
- Time zone: UTC+02:00 (EET)
  - Summer (DST): UTC+03:00 (EEST)
- Postal code: 627425
- Area code: +(40) 237
- Vehicle reg.: VN
- Website: vintileasca.primarievn.ro

Vintileasca is a commune located in Vrancea County, Romania. It is composed of six villages: Bahnele, După Măgura, Neculele, Poiana Stoichii, Tănăsari, and Vintileasca.

Historical population
Year	Pop.	±%
2002	2,150	—
2011	1,981	−7.9%
2021	1,724	−13.0%
Source: Census data
