= Obrejița =

- Commune
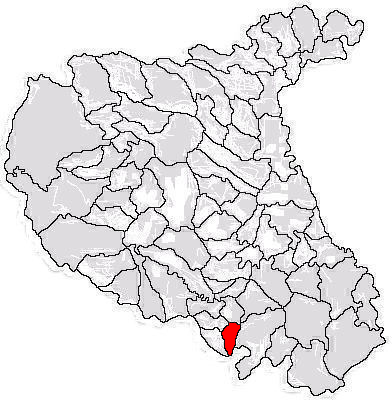
- Location in Vrancea County

- Location in Romania
- Coordinates: 45°30′N 27°5′E
- Country: Romania
- County: Vrancea

Government
  - Mayor (2024–2028): Adrian Anița-Enache (PNL)
- Area: 15.64 km^{2} (6.04 sq mi)
- Elevation: 85 m (279 ft)
- Population (2021-12-01): 1,544
  - Density: 98.72/km^{2} (255.7/sq mi)
- Time zone: UTC+02:00 (EET)
  - Summer (DST): UTC+03:00 (EEST)
- Postal code: 627356
- Area code: +(40) 237
- Vehicle reg.: VN
- Website: primariaobrejita.ro

Obrejița is a commune located in Vrancea County, Romania. It is composed of a single village, Obrejița. It was part of Tâmboești Commune until 2004, when it was split off to form a separate commune.

Historical population
| Year | Pop. | ±% |
|---|---|---|
| 2002 | 1,556 | — |
| 2011 | 1,583 | +1.7% |
| 2021 | 1,544 | −2.5% |
Source: Census data
