= Puiești, Buzău =

Puiești
- Commune
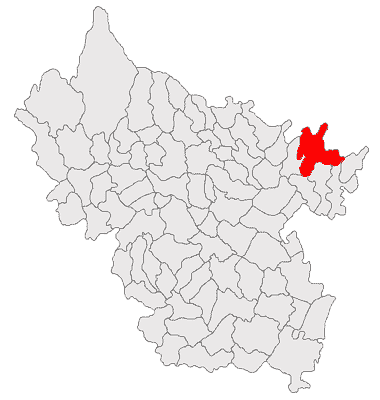
- Location in Buzău County

- Location in Romania
- Coordinates: 45°23′57″N 27°12′59″E
- Country: Romania
- County: Buzău
- Subdivisions: Dăscălești, Lunca, Măcrina, Nicolești, Plopi, Puieștii de Jos, Puieștii de Sus

Government
  - Mayor (2020–2024): Rodica Bârlă (PRO)
- Area: 100.17 km^{2} (38.68 sq mi)
- Elevation: 60 m (200 ft)
- Population (2021-12-01): 3,371
  - Density: 33.65/km^{2} (87.16/sq mi)
- Time zone: EET/EEST (UTC+2/+3)
- Postal code: 127495
- Area code: +(40) 238
- Vehicle reg.: BZ
- Website: primariapuiesti-bz.ro

Puiești is a commune in Buzău County, Muntenia, Romania. It is composed of seven villages: Dăscălești, Lunca, Măcrina, Nicolești, Plopi, Puieștii de Jos (the commune centre), and Puieștii de Sus.

== Location ==
Puiești is situated in the northeast of Buzău County, about 15 km (9.3 mi) East from the city Râmnicu Sărat, on the border with Vrancea County.

== Demographics ==
Historical population
Year	Pop.	±%
2002	4,571	—
2011	4,146	−9.3%
2021	3,371	−18.7%
Source: Census data

At the 2002 census, the commune had a population of 4,571. At the 2011 census, Puiești had a population of 4,146, while at the 2021 census, the population had decreased to 3,371.

== Economy ==
Most of the inhabitants of this commune practice agriculture in small family farms. There is a church, a police station, a small hospital, a primary school, and a few places to go out like bars and pubs.
