= Vârteșcoiu =

- Commune
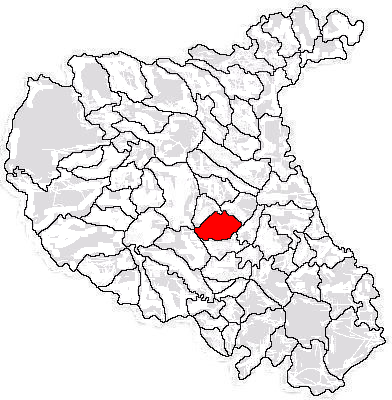
- Location in Vrancea County

- Location in Romania
- Coordinates: 45°44′N 27°5′E
- Country: Romania
- County: Vrancea

Government
  - Mayor (2024–2028): Viorel Mîrza (PSD)
- Area: 38.80 km^{2} (14.98 sq mi)
- Elevation: 122 m (400 ft)
- Population (2021-12-01): 3,421
  - Density: 88.17/km^{2} (228.4/sq mi)
- Time zone: UTC+02:00 (EET)
  - Summer (DST): UTC+03:00 (EEST)
- Postal code: 627405
- Area code: +(40) 237
- Vehicle reg.: VN
- Website: www.virtescoiu.ro

Vârteșcoiu is a commune located in Vrancea County, Muntenia, Romania. It is composed of six villages: Beciu, Faraoanele, Olteni, Pietroasa, Râmniceanca, and Vârteșcoiu.

The commune is located in the central part of the county, on the right bank of the Milcov River.

Historical population
Year	Pop.	±%
2002	3,423	—
2011	3,151	−7.9%
2021	3,421	+8.6%
Source: Census data

A small 13th-century fort discovered at Vârteșcoiu has been suggested as a candidate for the civitas de Mylco (on the Milcov River), the seat of the bishop of the Diocese of Cumania mentioned in a 1278 papal letter (see Roman Catholic Diocese of Cumania: List of bishops).
