= Valea Râmnicului =

- Commune
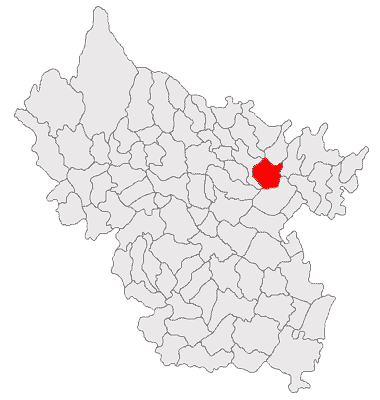
- Location in Buzău County

- Location in Romania
- Coordinates: 45°21′30″N 27°2′40″E
- Country: Romania
- County: Buzău
- Subdivisions: Oreavu, Rubla, Valea Râmnicului

Government
  - Mayor (2020–2024): Marian Galbenu (PSD)
- Area: 56.23 km^{2} (21.71 sq mi)
- Elevation: 119 m (390 ft)
- Population (2021-12-01): 5,180
  - Density: 92.1/km^{2} (239/sq mi)
- Time zone: EET/EEST (UTC+2/+3)
- Postal code: 127660
- Area code: +(40) 238
- Vehicle reg.: BZ
- Website: comunavalearimnicului.ro

Valea Râmnicului is a commune in Buzău County, Muntenia, Romania. It is composed of three villages: Oreavu, Rubla, and Valea Râmnicului.

Historical population
Year	Pop.	±%
2002	5,786	—
2011	5,425	−6.2%
2021	5,180	−4.5%
Source: Census data
