= Ciorăști =

- Commune
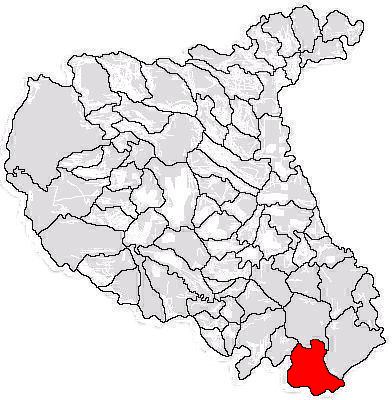
- Location in Vrancea County

- Location in Romania
- Coordinates: 45°26′N 27°18′E
- Country: Romania
- County: Vrancea

Government
  - Mayor (2024–2028): Nicolae-Gabriel Brăicău (PNL)
- Area: 97.68 km^{2} (37.71 sq mi)
- Elevation: 40 m (130 ft)
- Population (2021-12-01): 2,745
  - Density: 28/km^{2} (73/sq mi)
- Time zone: EET/EEST (UTC+2/+3)
- Postal code: 627080
- Area code: +(40) x37
- Vehicle reg.: VN
- Website: comunaciorasti.ro

Ciorăști is a commune located in Vrancea County, Romania. It is composed of seven villages: Ciorăști, Codrești, Mihălceni, Salcia Nouă, Salcia Veche, Satu Nou, and Spătăreasa.

The commune is located at the southeastern extremity of the county, on the banks of the river Râmnicul Sărat.

Historical population
| Year | Pop. | ±% |
|---|---|---|
| 2002 | 3,871 | — |
| 2011 | 3,150 | −18.6% |
| 2021 | 2,745 | −12.9% |
Source: Census data

== Natives ==
- Ioan Dumitrache (1889–1977), a major general during World War II, in command of the 2nd Mountain Division.
