= Broșteni, Vrancea =

Broșteni
- Commune
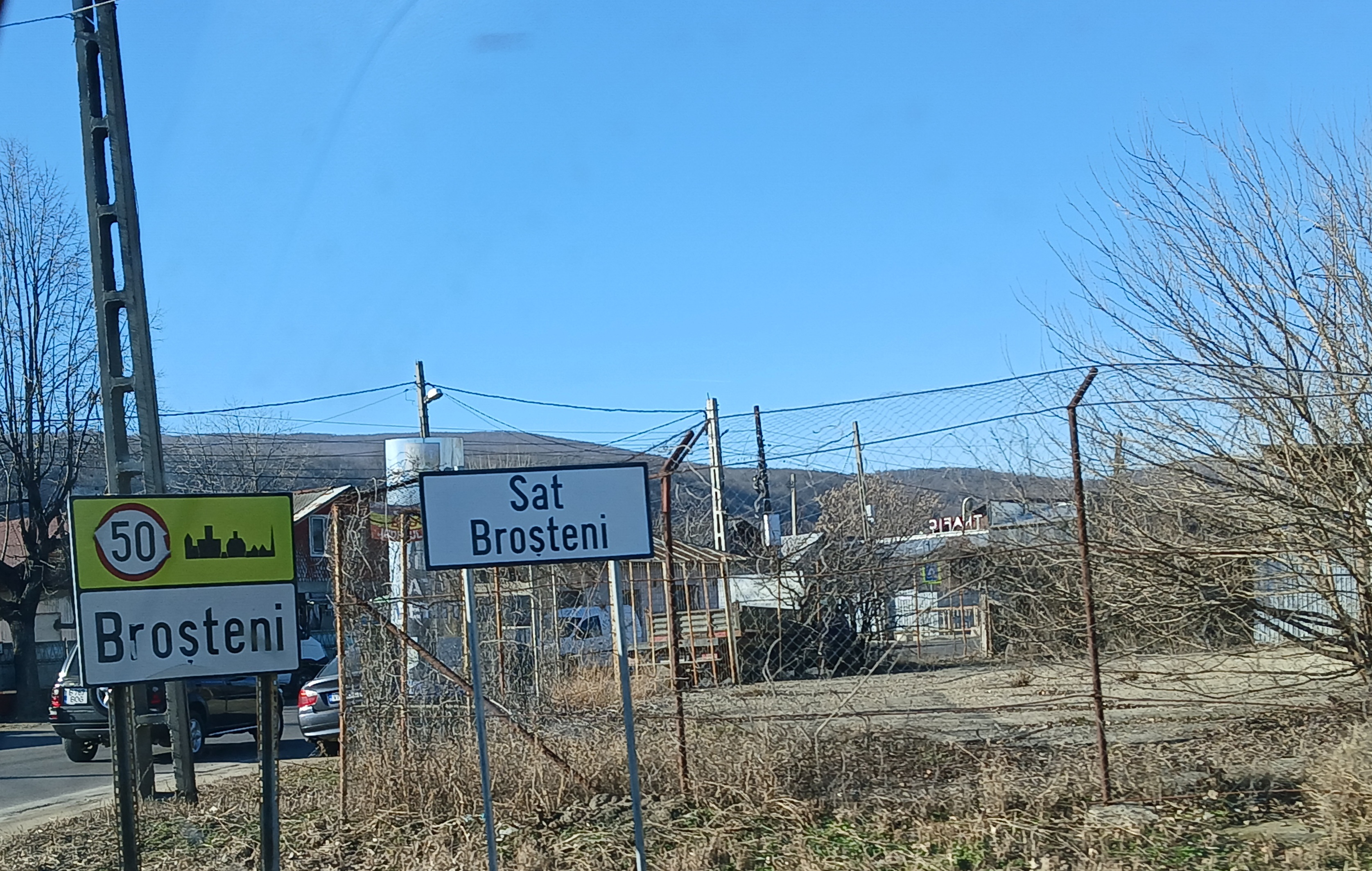
- Entrance sign to Broșteni

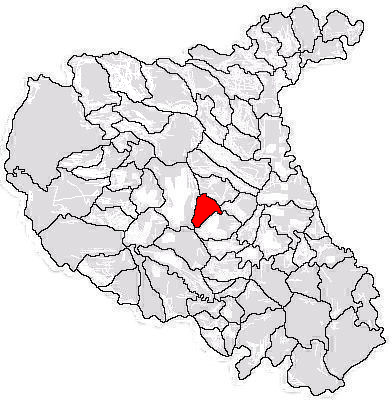
- Location in Vrancea County

- Location in Romania
- Coordinates: 45°45′N 27°02′E
- Country: Romania
- County: Vrancea

Government
  - Mayor (2024–2028): Emilian Florin Dumitriu (PNL)
- Area: 27.13 km^{2} (10.47 sq mi)
- Elevation: 181 m (594 ft)
- Population (2021-12-01): 2,388
  - Density: 88.02/km^{2} (228.0/sq mi)
- Time zone: UTC+02:00 (EET)
  - Summer (DST): UTC+03:00 (EEST)
- Postal code: 627050
- Area code: +(40) x37
- Vehicle reg.: VN
- Website: www.brosteni.primarievn.ro

Broșteni is a commune located in Vrancea County, Muntenia, Romania. It is composed of three villages: Arva, Broșteni, and Pitulușa.

Historical population
Year	Pop.	±%
2002	2,132	—
2011	2,054	−3.7%
2021	2,388	+16.3%
Source: Census data
