= Buda, Buzău =

Buda
- Commune
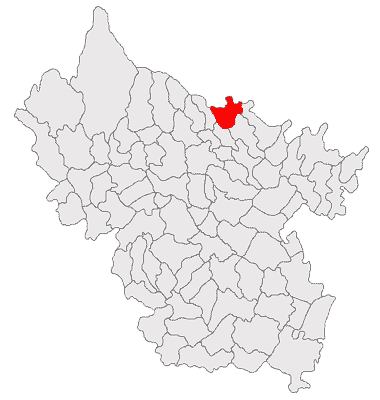
- Location in Buzău County

- Location in Romania
- Coordinates: 45°30′N 26°54′E
- Country: Romania
- County: Buzău
- Subdivisions: Alexandru Odobescu, Buda, Dănulești, Mucești-Dănulești, Spidele, Toropălești, Valea Largă

Government
  - Mayor (2020–2024): Ion Tudose (PSD)
- Area: 44.06 km^{2} (17.01 sq mi)
- Elevation: 279 m (915 ft)
- Population (2021-12-01): 2,896
  - Density: 66/km^{2} (170/sq mi)
- Time zone: EET/EEST (UTC+2/+3)
- Postal code: 127110
- Area code: +(40) 238
- Vehicle reg.: BZ
- Website: www.comuna-buda.ro

Buda is a commune in Buzău County, Muntenia, Romania, located in the vicinity of the Carpathian Mountains. It is composed of seven villages: Alexandru Odobescu, Buda, Dănulești, Mucești-Dănulești, Spidele, Toropălești, and Valea Largă.

Historical population
Year	Pop.	±%
2002	3,281	—
2011	2,870	−12.5%
2021	2,896	+0.9%
Source: Census data
