= Topliceni =

- Commune
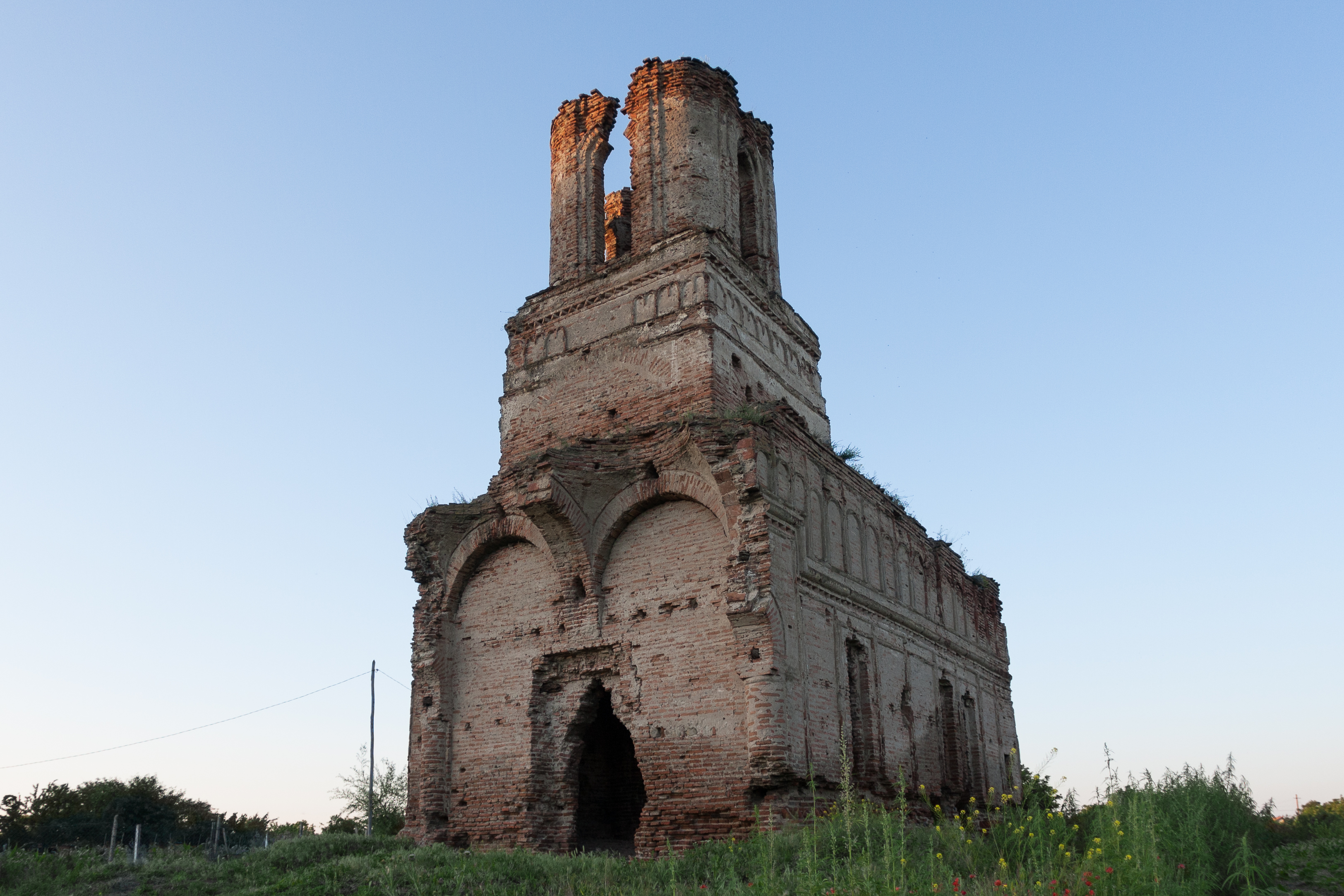
- Ruins of St. John Damaschin Church in Poșta

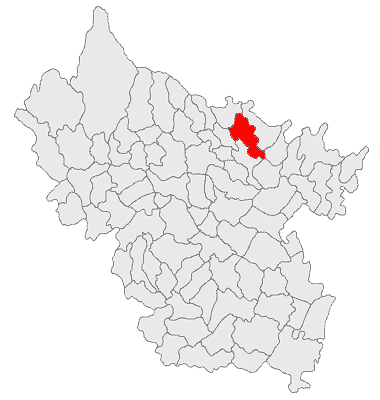
- Location in Buzău County

- Location in Romania
- Coordinates: 45°24′0″N 27°0′40″E
- Country: Romania
- County: Buzău
- Subdivisions: Băbeni, Ceairu, Dedulești, Gura Făget, Poșta, Răducești, Topliceni

Government
  - Mayor (2020–2024): Viorel Panțuru (PSD)
- Area: 67.25 km^{2} (25.97 sq mi)
- Elevation: 150 m (490 ft)
- Population (2021-12-01): 3,987
  - Density: 59.29/km^{2} (153.6/sq mi)
- Time zone: UTC+02:00 (EET)
  - Summer (DST): UTC+03:00 (EEST)
- Postal code: 127630
- Area code: +(40) 238
- Vehicle reg.: BZ
- Website: comunatopliceni.ro

Topliceni is a commune in Buzău County, Muntenia, Romania. It is composed of seven villages: Băbeni, Ceairu, Dedulești, Gura Făgetului, Poșta, Răducești, and Topliceni.

The commune is located in the northern part of the county, right next to the city of Râmnicu Sărat, some 40 km (25 mi) north of the county seat, Buzău.

Historical population
Year	Pop.	±%
2002	4,429	—
2011	4,080	−7.9%
2021	3,987	−2.3%
Source: Census data
