= Râmnicelu, Buzău =

Râmnicelu
- Commune
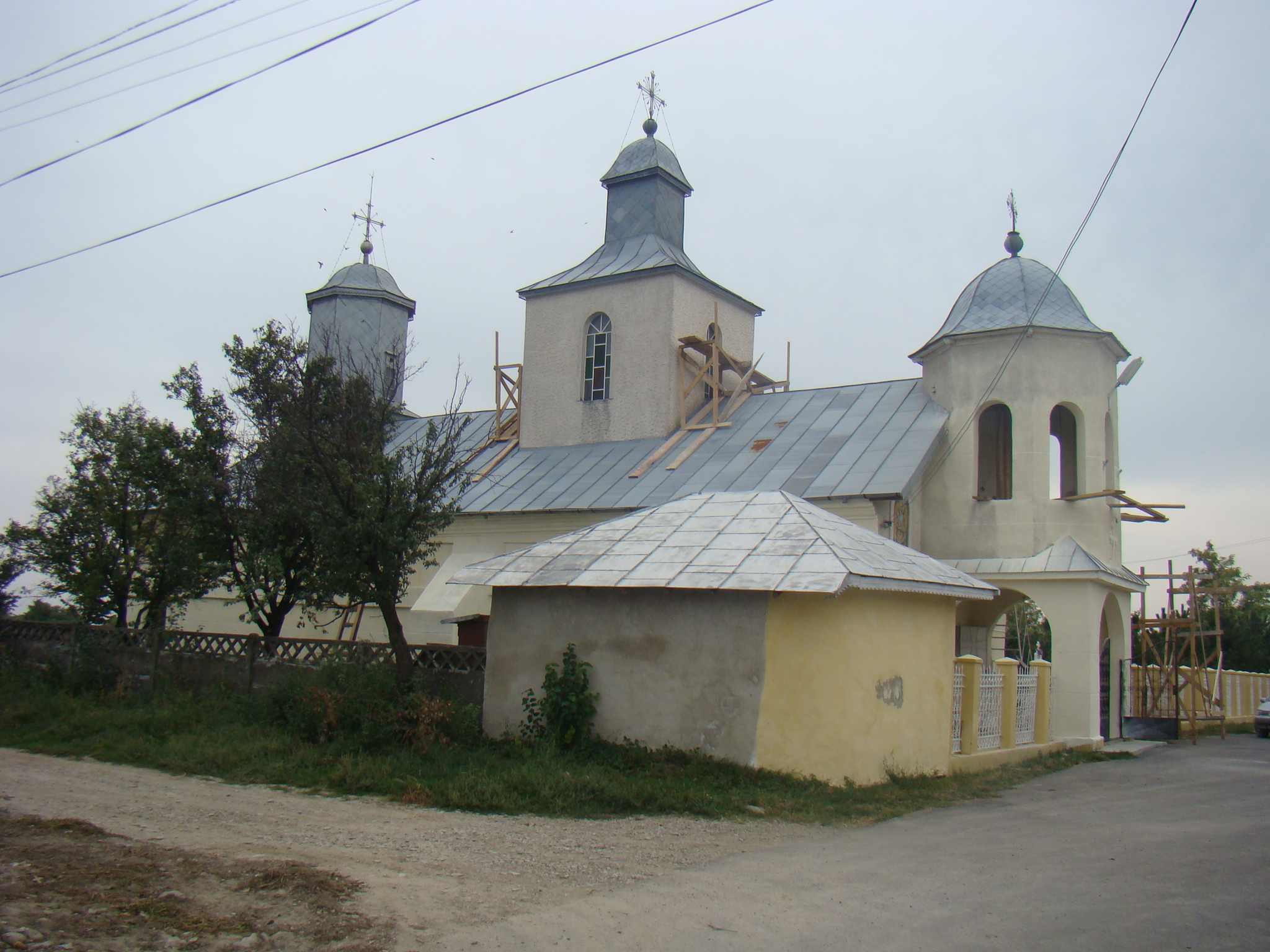
- Church of the Holy Archangels Michael and Gabriel in Râmnicelu

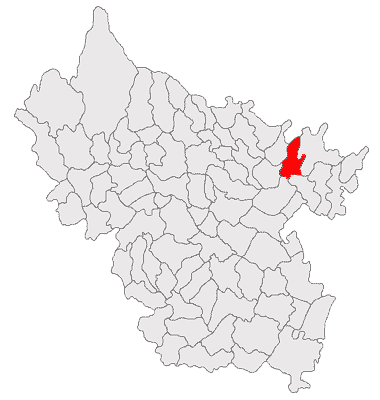
- Location in Buzău County

- Location in Romania
- Coordinates: 45°22′N 27°07′E
- Country: Romania
- County: Buzău
- Subdivisions: Colibași, Fotin, Râmnicelu, Știubei

Government
  - Mayor (2020–2024): Dumitru Stanciu (PSD)
- Area: 48.54 km^{2} (18.74 sq mi)
- Elevation: 86 m (282 ft)
- Population (2021-12-01): 4,726
  - Density: 97.36/km^{2} (252.2/sq mi)
- Time zone: UTC+02:00 (EET)
  - Summer (DST): UTC+03:00 (EEST)
- Postal code: 127510
- Area code: +(40) 238
- Vehicle reg.: BZ
- Website: www.rimnicelu.ro

Râmnicelu is a commune in Buzău County, Muntenia, Romania. It is composed of four villages: Colibași, Fotin, Râmnicelu, and Știubei.

Historical population
| Year | Pop. | ±% |
|---|---|---|
| 2002 | 4,335 | — |
| 2011 | 4,789 | +10.5% |
| 2021 | 4,726 | −1.3% |
Source: Census data

At the 2011 census, the commune had 4,789 inhabitants, of which 57.1% were Romanians and 42.7% were Roma. At the 2021 census, Râmnicelu had a population of 4,726; of those, 45.3% were Romanians and 40.48% Roma.

== See also ==
- Luceafărul Club Râmnicelu
