= Golești, Vrancea =

Golești
- Commune
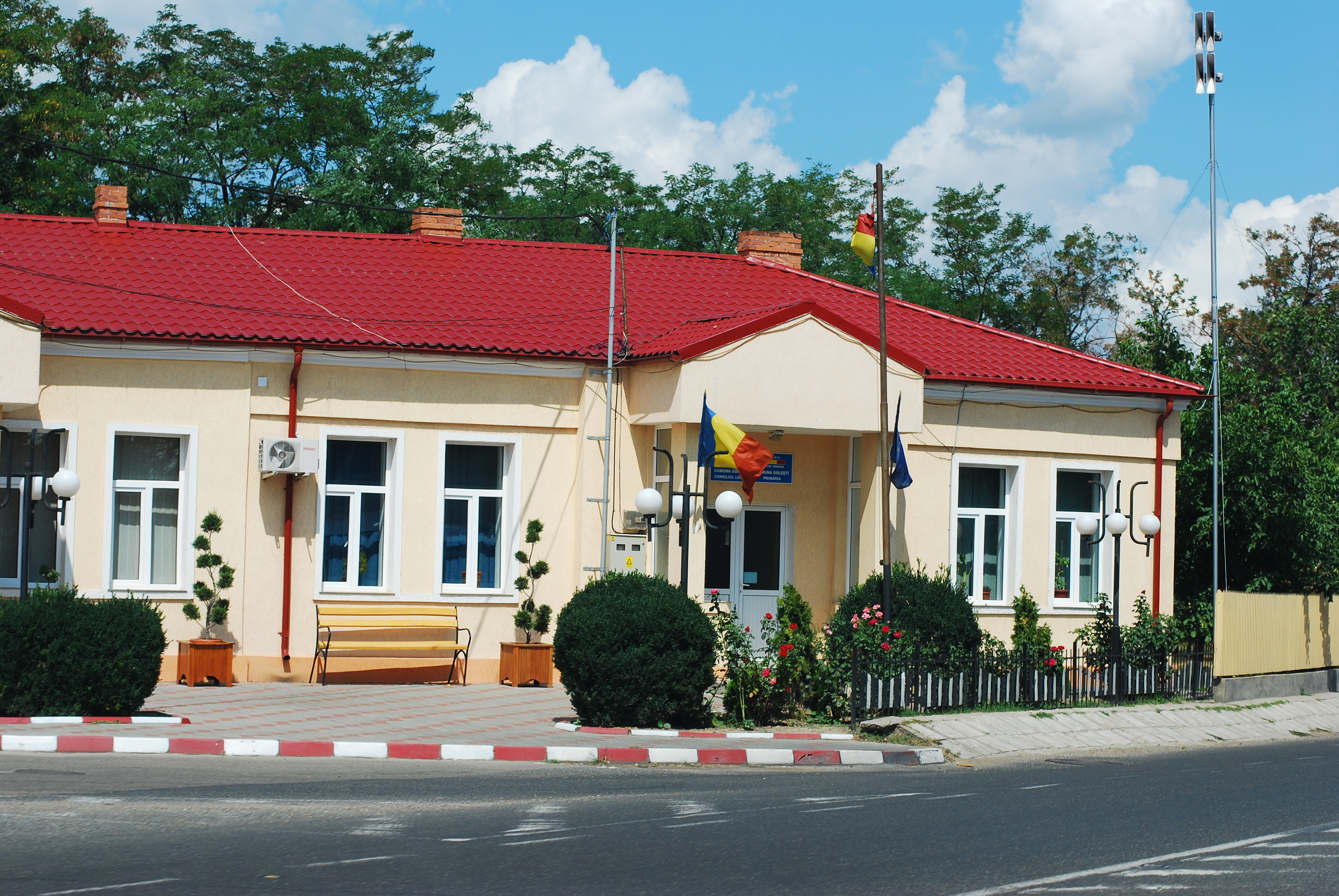
- Golești town hall

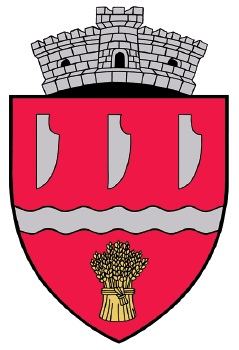
- Coat of arms

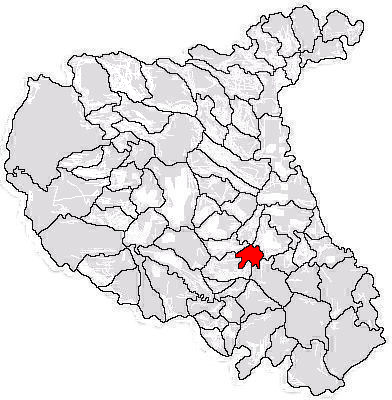
- Location in Vrancea County

- Location in Romania
- Coordinates: 45°40′N 27°8′E
- Country: Romania
- County: Vrancea

Government
  - Mayor (2024–2028): Alexandru Zar (PSD)
- Elevation: 52 m (171 ft)
- Population (2021-12-01): 4,885
- Time zone: UTC+02:00 (EET)
  - Summer (DST): UTC+03:00 (EEST)
- Postal code: 627150
- Area code: +(40) 237
- Vehicle reg.: VN
- Website: comunagolesti-vrancea.ro

Golești is a commune located in Vrancea County, Muntenia, Romania. It is composed of two villages, Ceardac and Golești.

Historical population
Year	Pop.	±%
2002	3,556	—
2011	4,115	+15.7%
2021	4,885	+18.7%
Source: Census data
