= Tâmboești =

- Commune
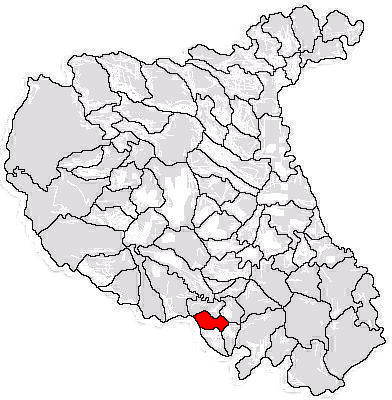
- Location in Vrancea County

- Location in Romania
- Coordinates: 45°31′N 27°3′E
- Country: Romania
- County: Vrancea

Government
  - Mayor (2024–2028): Mariean Pleșea (PNL)
- Area: 24.27 km^{2} (9.37 sq mi)
- Elevation: 184 m (604 ft)
- Population (2021-12-01): 3,151
  - Density: 130/km^{2} (340/sq mi)
- Time zone: EET/EEST (UTC+2/+3)
- Postal code: 627355
- Area code: +(40) 237
- Vehicle reg.: VN
- Website: tamboesti.primarievn.ro

Tâmboești is a commune located in Vrancea County, Romania. It is composed of five villages: Pădureni, Pietroasa, Slimnic, Tâmboești, and Trestieni. It also included the village of Obrejița until 2004, when it was split off to form a separate commune.

== Demographics ==
At the 2011 census, Tâmboești had a population of 2,887; of the inhabitants for whom data were available, 50.3% were Romanians and 49.7% were Roma; 86.6% were Romanian Orthodox, 9.7% Pentecostal, 2.4% Adventist, and 1.2% Old Calendar Romanian Orthodox. At the 2021 census, the population had increased to 3,151; of those, 59% were Roma and 34.75% Romanians.

Historical population
Year	Pop.	±%
2002	3,013	—
2011	2,887	−4.2%
2021	3,151	+9.1%
Source: Census data

== Natives ==
- Ion Gavăț (1900–1978), bobsledder
