= Bălești, Vrancea =

Bălești
- Commune
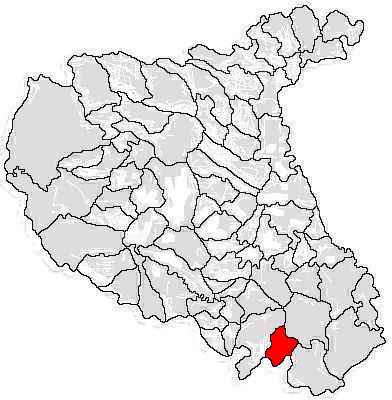
- Location in Vrancea County

- Location in Romania
- Coordinates: 45°26′N 27°14′E
- Country: Romania
- County: Vrancea

Government
  - Mayor (2024–2028): Silviu-Stoica Gheorghe (PNL)
- Area: 39.55 km^{2} (15.27 sq mi)
- Elevation: 50 m (160 ft)
- Population (2021-12-01): 1,938
  - Density: 49/km^{2} (130/sq mi)
- Time zone: EET/EEST (UTC+2/+3)
- Postal code: 627015
- Area code: +(40) 237
- Vehicle reg.: VN
- Website: www.primariabalesti.ro

Bălești is a commune located in Vrancea County, Muntenia, Romania. It is composed of a single village, Bălești.

Historical population
Year	Pop.	±%
2002	2,182	—
2011	1,941	−11.0%
2021	1,938	−0.2%
Source: Census data
