= Podgoria =

- Commune
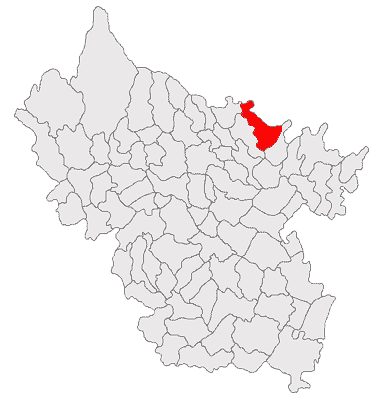
- Location in Buzău County

- Location in Romania
- Coordinates: 45°26′0″N 27°1′26″E
- Country: Romania
- County: Buzău
- Subdivisions: Coțatcu, Oratia, Pleșești, Podgoria, Tăbăcari

Government
  - Mayor (2020–2024): Marius-Viorel Chiru (PSD)
- Area: 51.6 km^{2} (19.9 sq mi)
- Elevation: 227 m (745 ft)
- Population (2021-12-01): 3,266
  - Density: 63.3/km^{2} (164/sq mi)
- Time zone: EET/EEST (UTC+2/+3)
- Postal code: 127480
- Area code: +(40) 238
- Vehicle reg.: BZ
- Website: comunapodgoria.ro

Podgoria is a commune in Buzău County, Muntenia, Romania. It is composed of five villages: Coțatcu, Oratia, Pleșești, Podgoria, and Tăbăcari.

Historical population
| Year | Pop. | ±% |
|---|---|---|
| 2002 | 3,360 | — |
| 2011 | 3,236 | −3.7% |
| 2021 | 3,266 | +0.9% |
Source: Census data

== Natives ==
- Victor Roșca (born 1954), football player and manager
