= Jitia =

- Commune
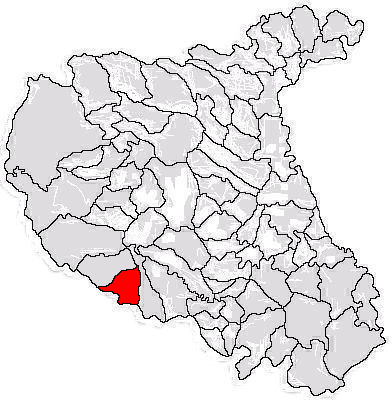
- Location in Vrancea County

- Location in Romania
- Coordinates: 45°35′N 26°45′E
- Country: Romania
- County: Vrancea

Government
  - Mayor (2024–2028): Ion Păun (PSD)
- Area: 45.68 km^{2} (17.64 sq mi)
- Elevation: 480 m (1,570 ft)
- Population (2021-12-01): 1,443
  - Density: 32/km^{2} (82/sq mi)
- Time zone: EET/EEST (UTC+2/+3)
- Postal code: 627185
- Area code: +(40) 237
- Vehicle reg.: VN
- Website: primariajitia.ro

Jitia is a commune located in Vrancea County, Romania. It is composed of five villages: Cerbu, Dealu Sării, Jitia, Jitia de Jos, and Măgura.

Historical population
| Year | Pop. | ±% |
|---|---|---|
| 2002 | 1,718 | — |
| 2011 | 1,609 | −6.3% |
| 2021 | 1,443 | −10.3% |
Source: Census data
