= Tătăranu =

- Commune
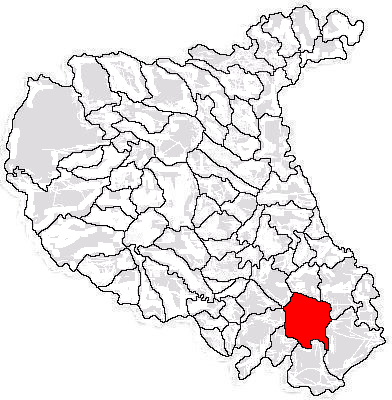
- Location in Vrancea County

- Location in Romania
- Coordinates: 45°31′N 27°19′E
- Country: Romania
- County: Vrancea

Government
  - Mayor (2024–2028): Bănel Bărbieru (PSD)
- Area: 92.2 km^{2} (35.6 sq mi)
- Elevation: 30 m (100 ft)
- Population (2021-12-01): 3,910
  - Density: 42/km^{2} (110/sq mi)
- Time zone: EET/EEST (UTC+2/+3)
- Postal code: 627350
- Area code: +(40) 237
- Vehicle reg.: VN
- Website: tataranu.primarievn.ro

Tătăranu is a commune located in Vrancea County, Romania. It is composed of five villages: Bordeasca Nouă, Bordeasca Veche, Mărtinești, Tătăranu, and Vâjâitoarea.

The commune is located in the southeastern part of the county, on the banks of the Râmnicul Sărat River.

Historical population
Year	Pop.	±%
2002	4,910	—
2011	3,952	−19.5%
2021	3,910	−1.1%
Source: Census data
