= Chiojdeni =

- Commune
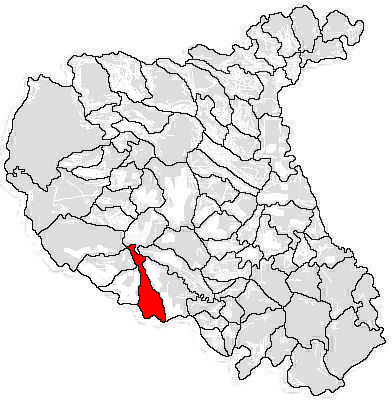
- Location in Vrancea County

- Location in Romania
- Coordinates: 45°33′N 26°52′E
- Country: Romania
- County: Vrancea

Government
  - Mayor (2024–2028): Grigore Constantin (PNL)
- Area: 71.98 km^{2} (27.79 sq mi)
- Elevation: 336 m (1,102 ft)
- Population (2021-12-01): 2,352
  - Density: 33/km^{2} (85/sq mi)
- Time zone: EET/EEST (UTC+2/+3)
- Postal code: 627070
- Area code: +(40) 237
- Vehicle reg.: VN
- Website: www.chiojdeni.primarievn.ro

Chiojdeni is a commune located in Vrancea County, Romania. It is composed of eight villages: Cătăuți, Chiojdeni, Lojnița, Luncile, Mărăcini, Podurile, Seciu, and Tulburea.

Historical population
Year	Pop.	±%
2002	2,439	—
2011	2,322	−4.8%
2021	2,352	+1.3%
Source: Census data
