= Oleșești =

Oleşeşti may refer to several villages in Romania:

- Oleşeşti, a village in Pârscov Commune, Buzău County
- Oleşeşti, a village in Țifești Commune, Vrancea County
