= Zăbrăuț =

River in Romania

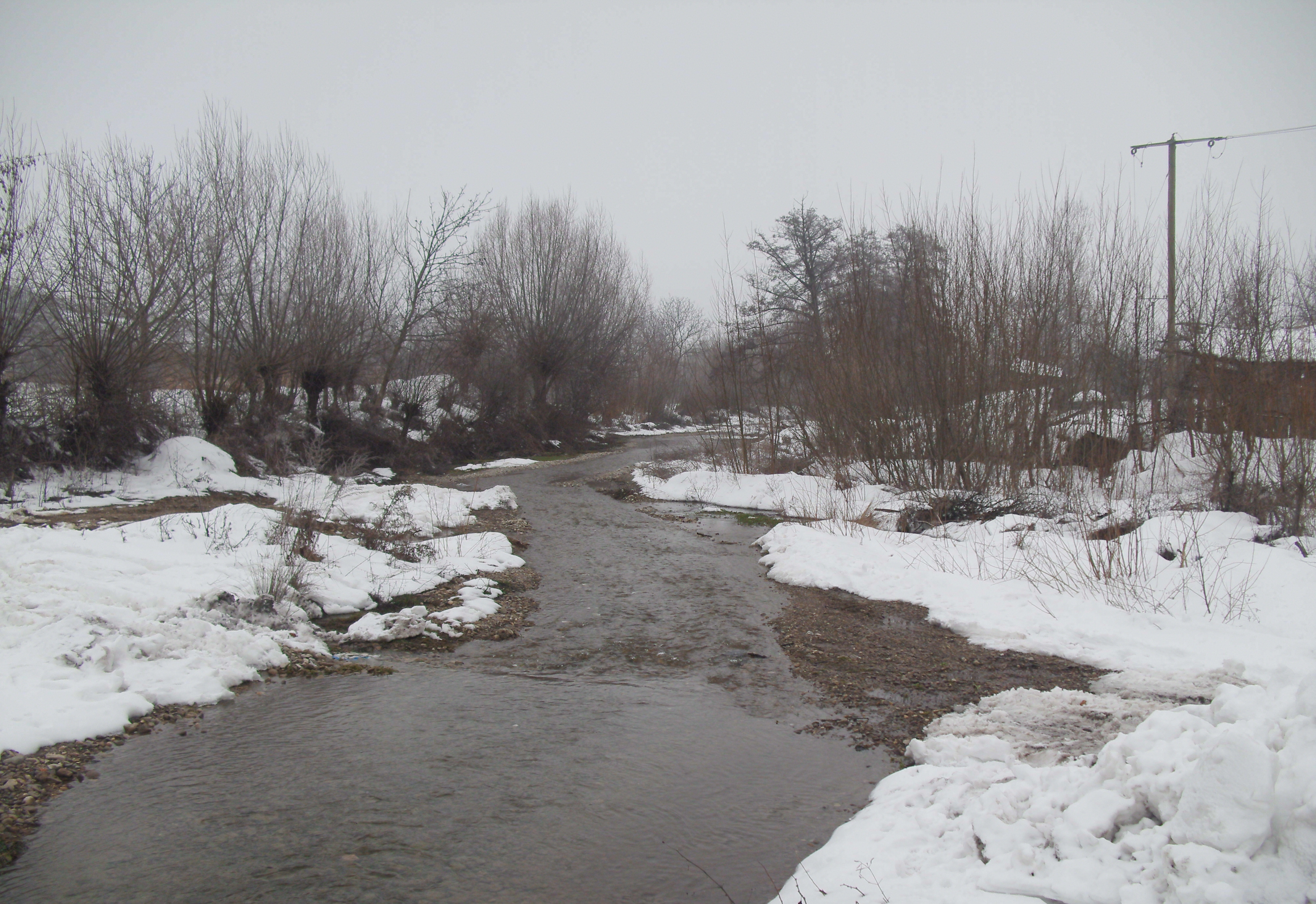

- Location within Romania

Location
- Country: Romania
- Counties: Vrancea County
- Villages: Fitionești, Movilița

Physical characteristics
- Mouth: Siret
  - coordinates: 45.8982°N 27.2759°E
- Length: 41 km (25 mi)
- Basin size: 113 km^{2} (44 sq mi)

Basin features
- Progression: Siret→ Danube→ Black Sea
- Tributaries
  - right: Zăbrăuțul Mic

The Zăbrăuț is a right tributary of the river Siret in Romania. It discharges into the Siret near Pădureni. Its length is 41 km (25 mi) and its basin size is 113 km^{2} (44 sq mi).
