= Vărsătura =

Vărsătura may refer to several villages in Romania:

- Vărsătura, a village in Chiscani Commune, Brăila County
- Vărsătura, a village in Jariștea Commune, Vrancea County
