= Mănăstioara =

Mănăstioara may refer to several villages in Romania:

- Mănăstioara, a village in Uliești Commune, Dâmbovița County
- Mănăstioara, a village in the town of Siret, Suceava County
- Mănăstioara, a village in Udești Commune, Suceava County
- Mănăstioara, a village in Fitionești Commune, Vrancea County
