= Domnești Princely Church =

Orthodox church in Vrancea County, Romania

Coordinates: 46°01′36″N 27°12′41″E

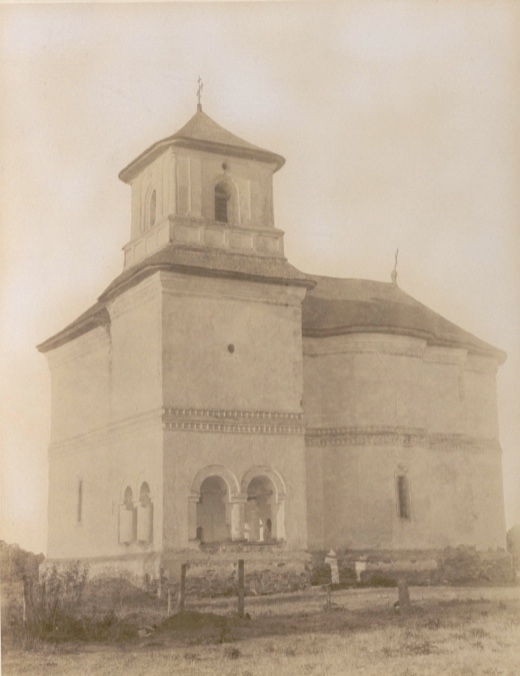
The church in 1893

The Domnești Princely Church (Romanian: Biserica Domnească din Domnești) is a Romanian Orthodox church located in Domnești-Târg village, Pufești Commune, Vrancea County, Romania. It is dedicated to the Dormition of the Mother of God.

The church was begun in 1661, during the reign of Eustratie Dabija, Prince of Moldavia, and completed in 1667 by George Ducas. Sanctified in 1701, it suffered damage during an earthquake in 1741. It was repaired subsequently, and again in 1771–1775.

The church is listed as a historic monument by Romania's Ministry of Culture and Religious Affairs.
