= Bordeștii =

Bordeștii may refer to one of two villages in Romania:

- Bordeștii Poieni, a village in Vidra Commune, Alba County
- Bordeștii de Jos, a village in Bordești Commune, Vrancea County
