= Angel Tîlvăr =

Romanian politician

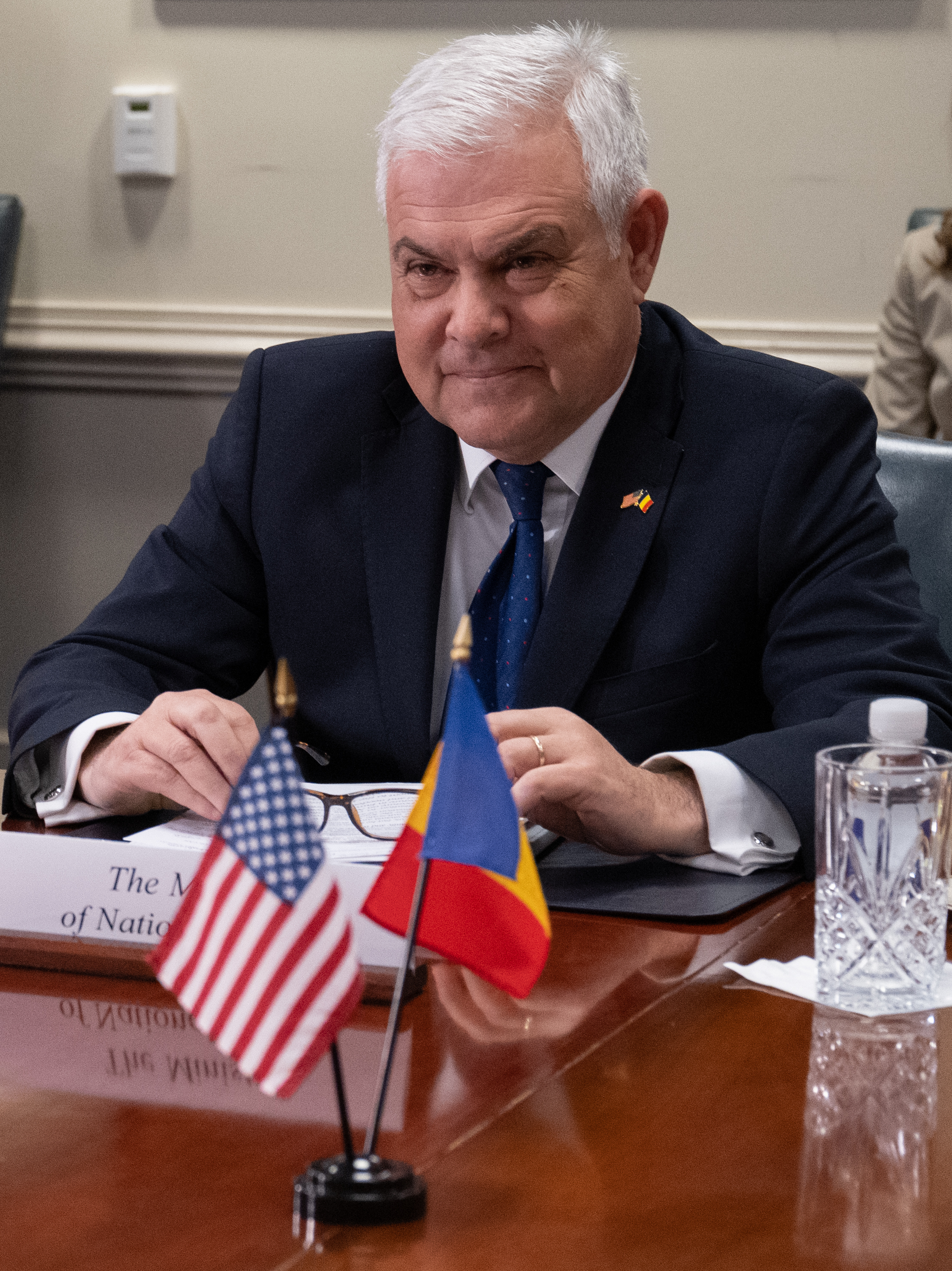
- Tîlvăr in 2023

Minister of National Defence
- In office 31 October 2022 – 23 June 2025
- Prime Minister: Nicolae Ciucă; Marcel Ciolacu; Cătălin Predoiu (acting)
- Preceded by: Vasile Dîncu
- Succeeded by: Ionuț Moșteanu

Personal details
- Born: 11 February 1962 (age 64) Urechești, Galați Region, Romanian People's Republic
- Party: Social Democratic Party
- Education: University of Bucharest; University of Iași

Angel Tîlvăr (Romanian pronunciation: [ˈand͡ʒel ˈtɨlvər]; born 11 February 1962) is a Romanian politician and English teacher who held the position of Minister of National Defense from 31 October 2022 until 23 June 2025. He was elected senator in the 2004–2008 legislature and then a deputy in the legislatures starting in 2008, in Vrancea County on the lists of the Social Democratic Party.

== Biography ==
Born in Urechești, Vrancea, Romania, Tîlvăr graduated in 1985 from the University of Bucharest. He was an English teacher between 1985 and 2004. In the 2004–2008 legislature, Tîlvăr was a member of the friendship parliamentary groups with the Republic of Ivory Coast and the Republic of Estonia. He was a member of the Committee for Education, science, youth and Sport and its secretary, the Committee for Culture, art and mass media (February 2006 – February 2008) and the Committee for human rights, religions, and Minorities (until February 2006). He initiated 20 legislative proposals (of which 6 were promulgated into law) and recorded 98 speeches in 69 parliamentary sessions.

In the 2008–2012 legislature, Tîlvăr was a member of the friendship parliamentary groups with the United Kingdom of Great Britain and Northern Ireland, the Republic of Ecuador, and the Kingdom of Morocco. He was a member of the Committee for Defense, public order and national security, and the Committee for European affairs. He initiated 28 legislative proposals of which 4 were promulgated into law and recorded 100 speeches in 92 parliamentary meetings.

In the 2012–2016 legislature, Tîlvăr was a member of the friendship parliamentary groups with the United Kingdom of Great Britain and Northern Ireland, Oman, and Iraq. He was a member of the Committee for Culture, arts, mass media (from June 2015), in the Committee for European affairs (from September 2014) – President (until December 2014), in the Committee for Education, science, youth and Sport (until September 2014) and in the Committee for European affairs (until June 2014). In December 2014 he was appointed Minister Delegate for Romanians Abroad. Tîlvăr initiated 46 legislative proposals of which 16 were promulgated laws and recorded 95 speeches in 61 parliamentary meetings.
