= Domnești =

Domneşti may refer to:

- Domnești, Argeș, a commune in Argeș County, Romania
- Domnești, Ilfov, a commune in Ilfov County, Romania
- Domneşti, a village in Mărișelu Commune, Bistrița-Năsăud County, Romania
- Domneşti-Sat and Domneşti-Târg, villages in Pufești Commune, Vrancea County
