= Neculai Munteanu =

Romanian dissident

Neculai Constantin Munteanu (n. 16 November 1941, Pufești, Vrancea County) is a Romanian dissident. Through his shows on Radio Free Europe he became known for condemning Nicolae Ceaușescu's regime, which lasted until 1989. His shows were secretly listened to by millions of Romanians.

After the fall of communism, Munteanu hosted a show on Radio Free Europe titled "Eu și câinele meu, Securitatea" ("Me and my dog, the Securitate").

== Personal life ==
In February 2007, Neculai Munteanu revealed that he was gay on his radio show. He stated that, "I must say this because it is true and because I can now say it to people who are tolerant, from a European country, who have learnt that the person close to you can also be different from you, but still human".
