= Valeriu Pantazi =

Romanian painter, poet and writer (1940–2015)

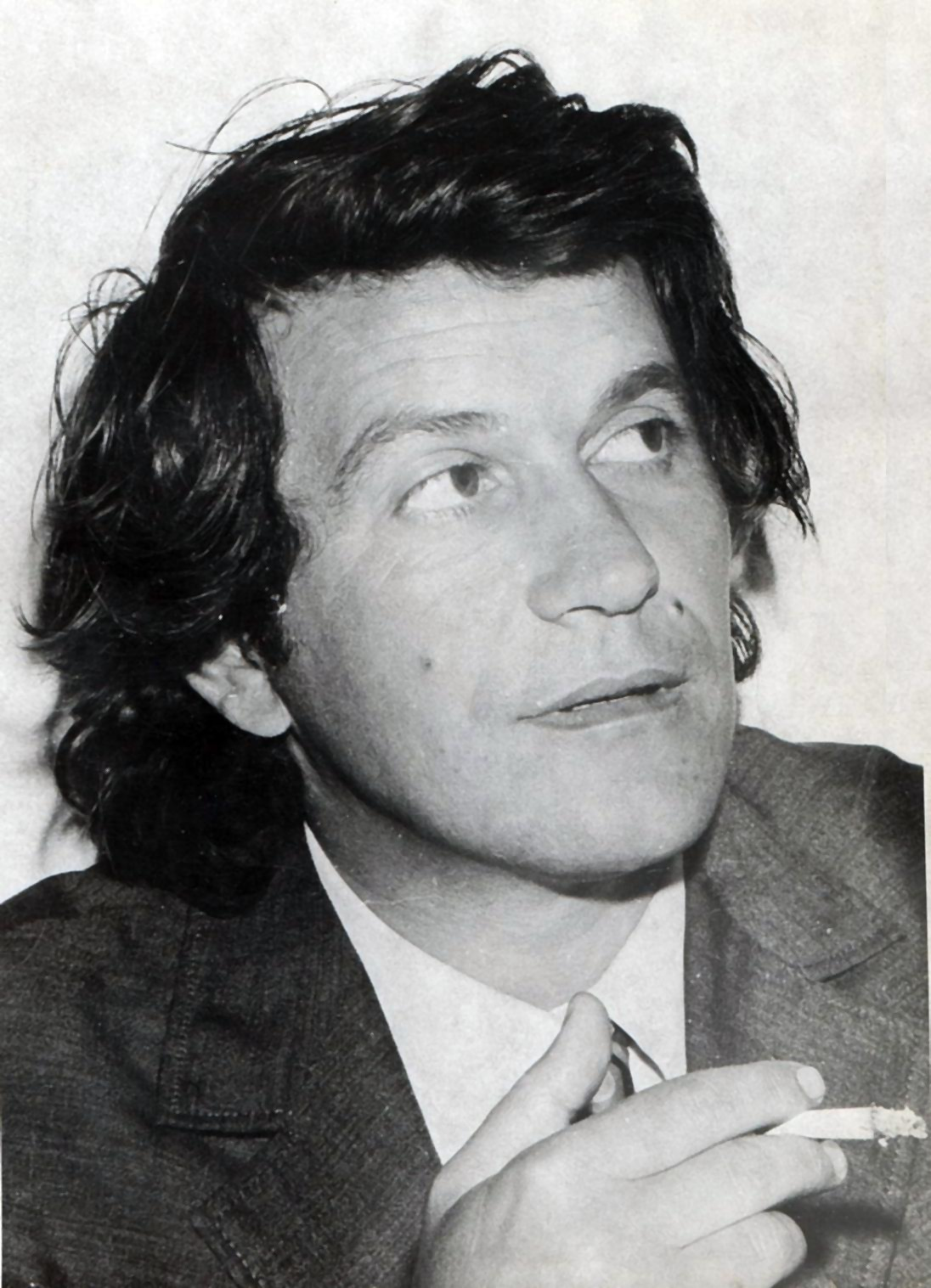
- Pantazi in 1980
- Born: Valeriu Pantazie Constantinescu; 17 May 1940; Urechești, Vrancea County, Kingdom of Romania
- Died: 25 July 2015 (aged 75); Bucharest, Romania
- Resting place: Străulești Cemetery, Bucharest
- Education: Octavian Angheluță; Corneliu Baba; Alexandru Ciucurencu
- Known for: Painting, engraving
- Movement: Post-Impressionism, science fiction, conceptual art, Impressionism, Abstract Expressionism, Cubism, CoBrA
- Spouse: Francisca Stoenescu
- Children: 1

Signature
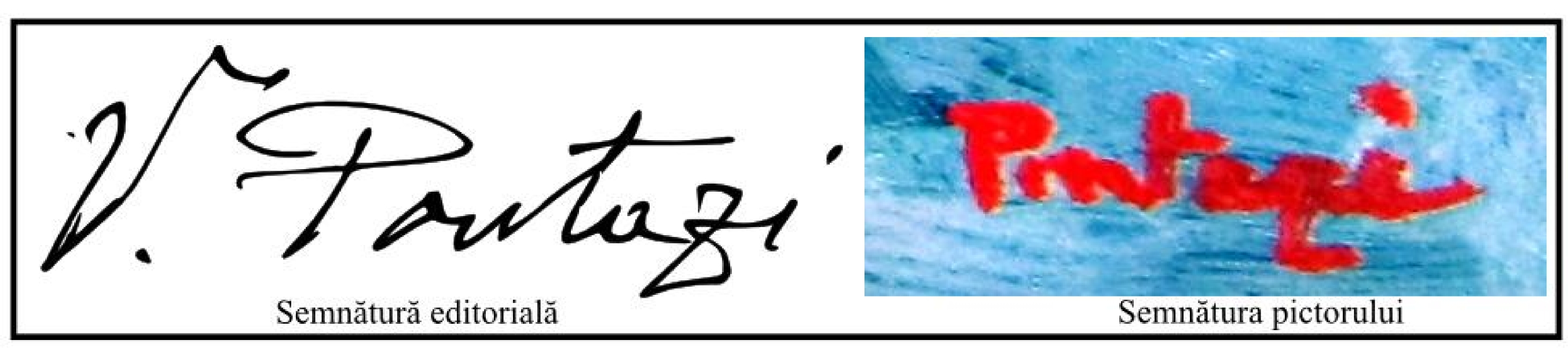

Valeriu Pantazi (born Pantazie Valeriu Constantinescu on 17 May 1940 – 25 July 2015) was a Romanian poet, writer, and painter.

He was born in Urechești (at the time in Râmnicu Sărat County, now in Vrancea County), the son of Octavian Constantinescu and Maria Oprescu. He completed his secondary education at the Bogdan Petriceicu Hasdeu High School in Buzău.

Pantazi died in Bucharest and is buried at Străulești Cemetery.

== Images ==
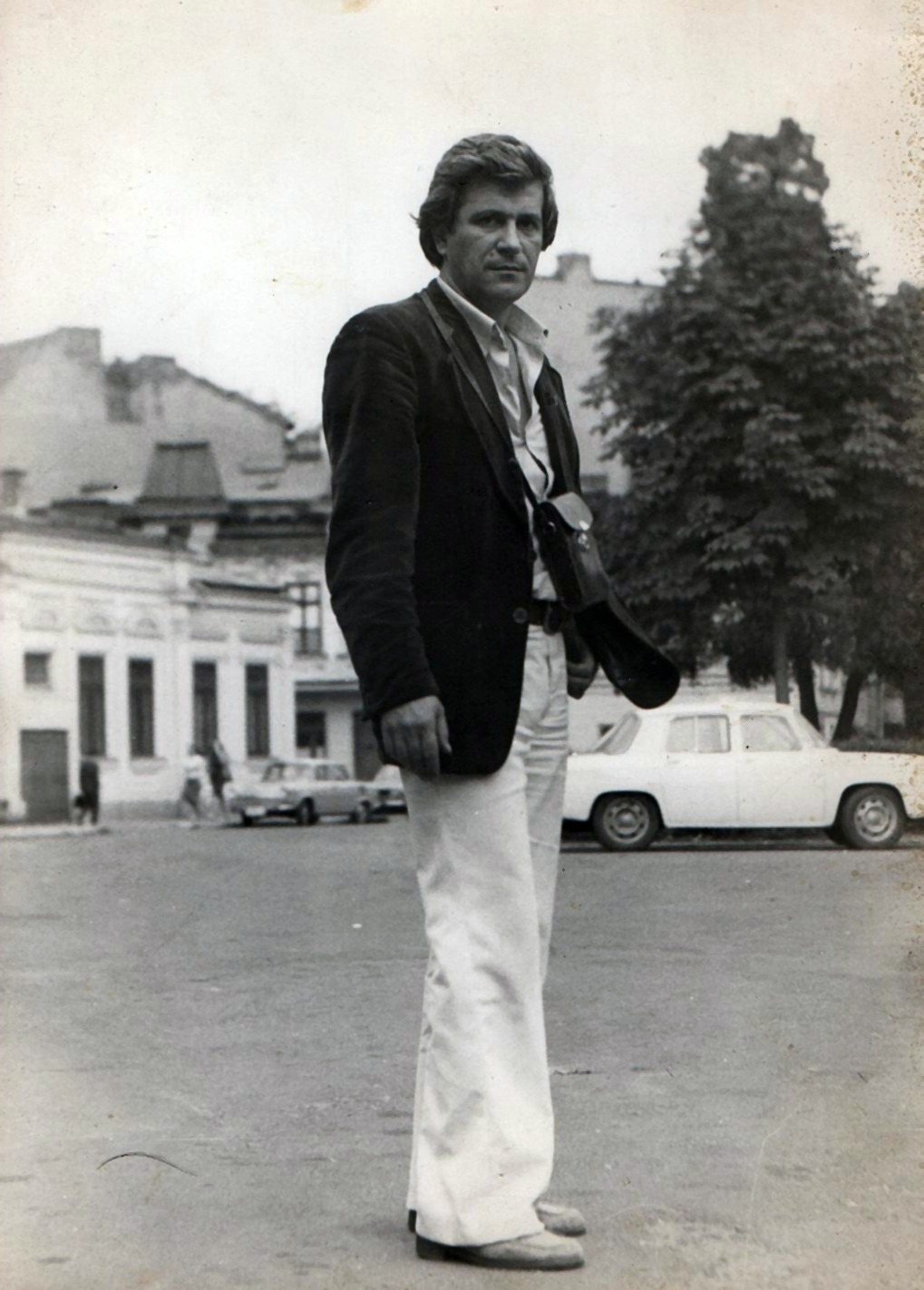
Valeriu Pantazi in 1970

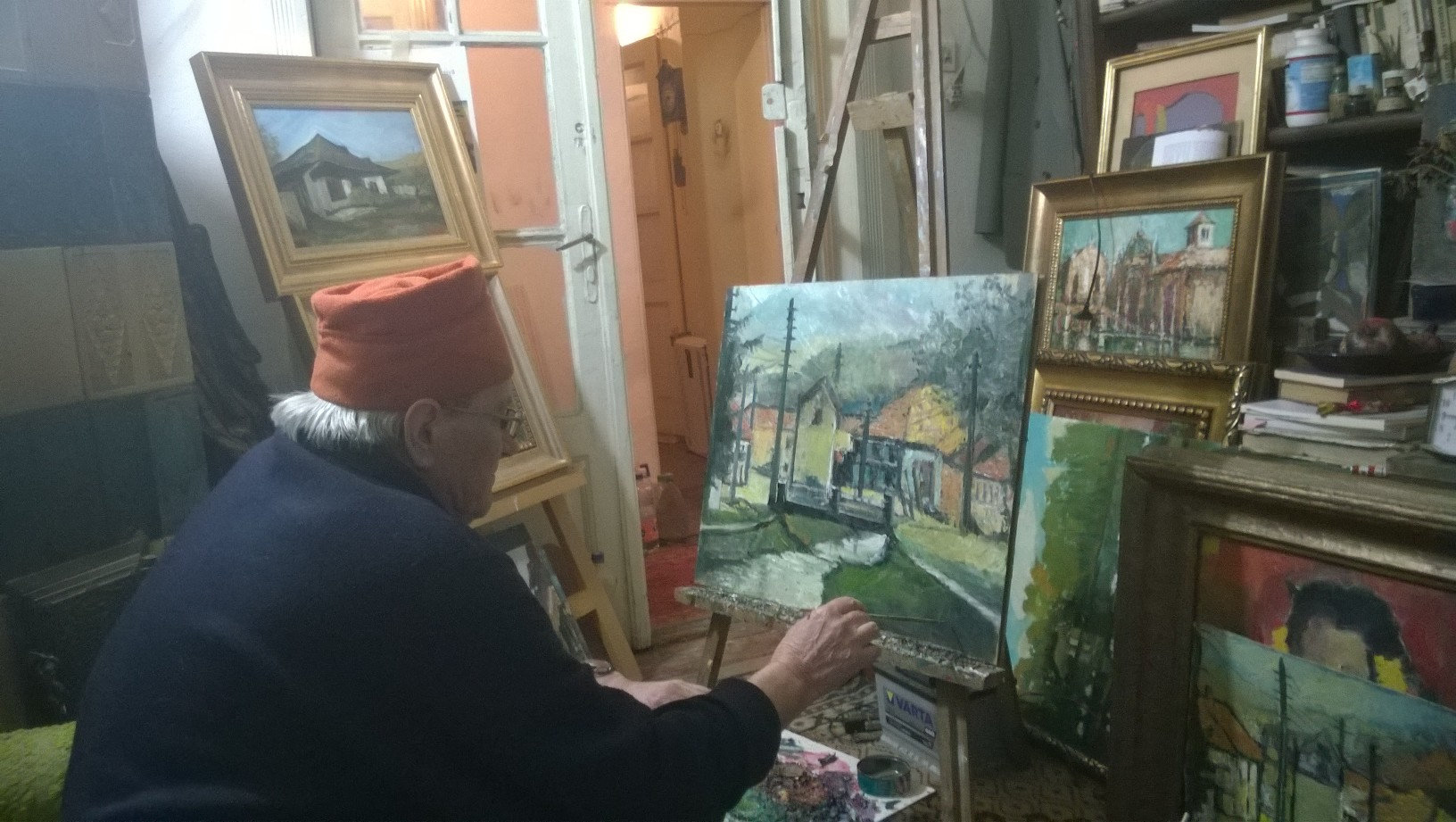
Pantazi in his studio 2014

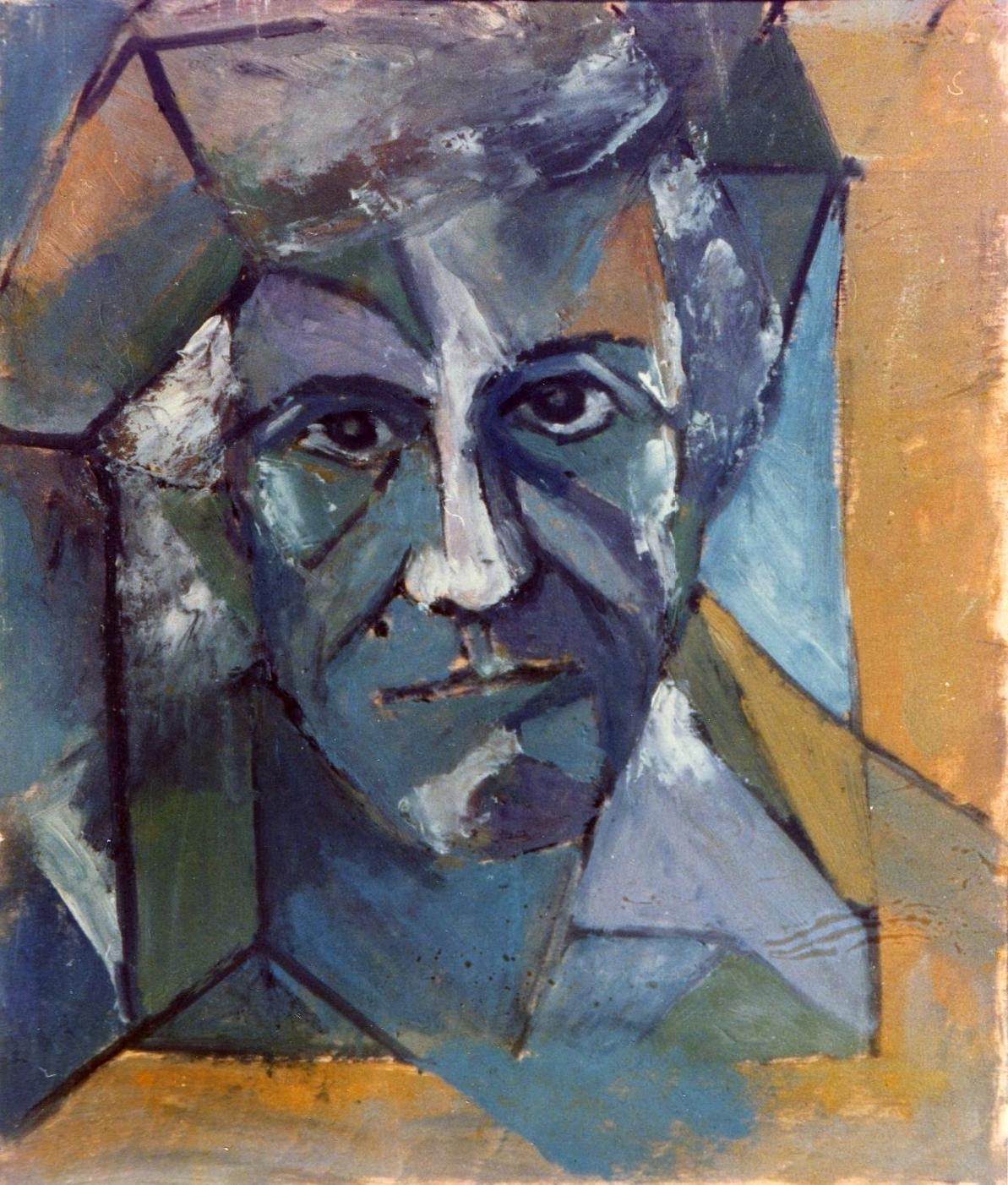
Self portrait (1988)

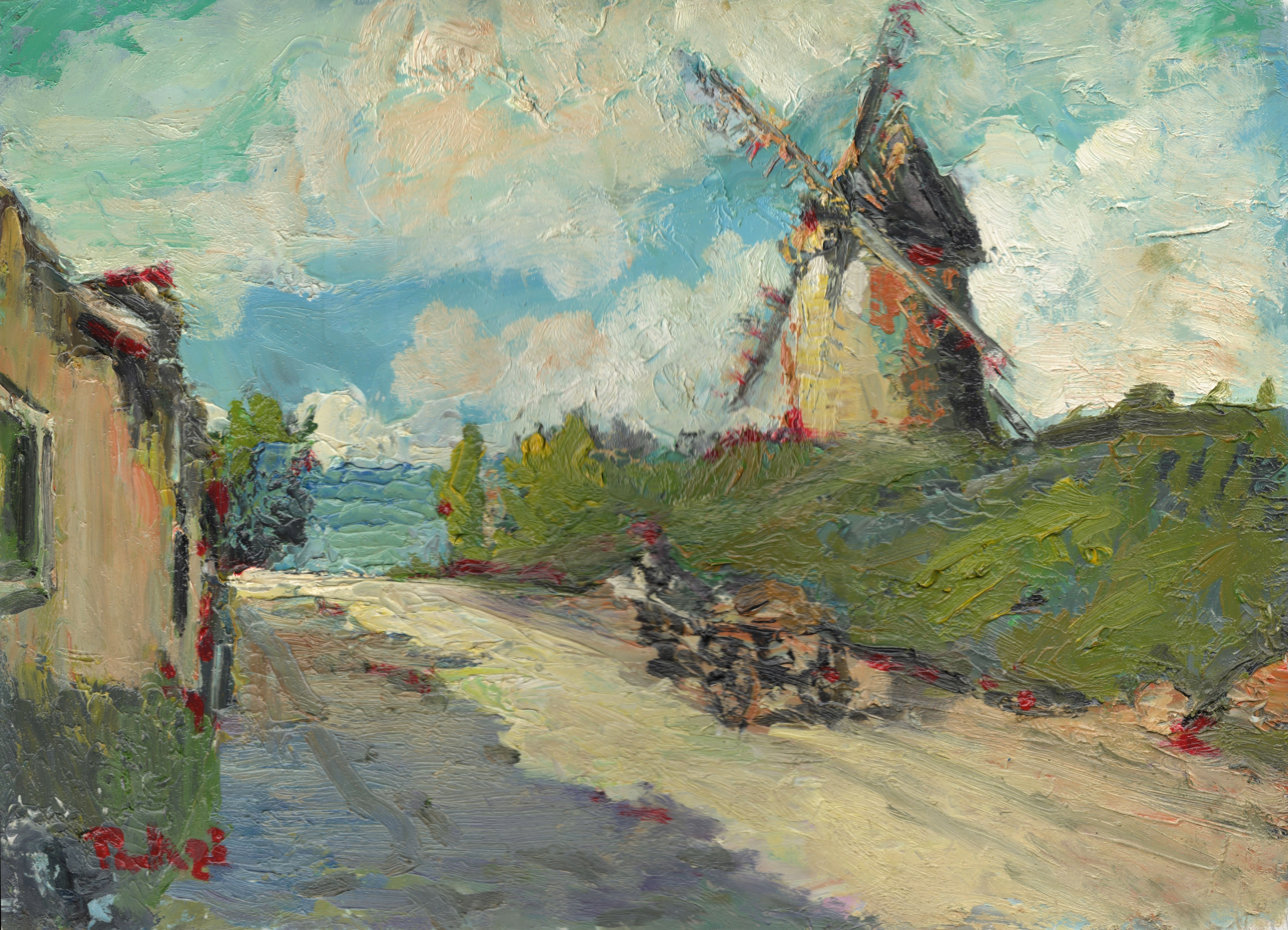
Dutch Windmill (2010)

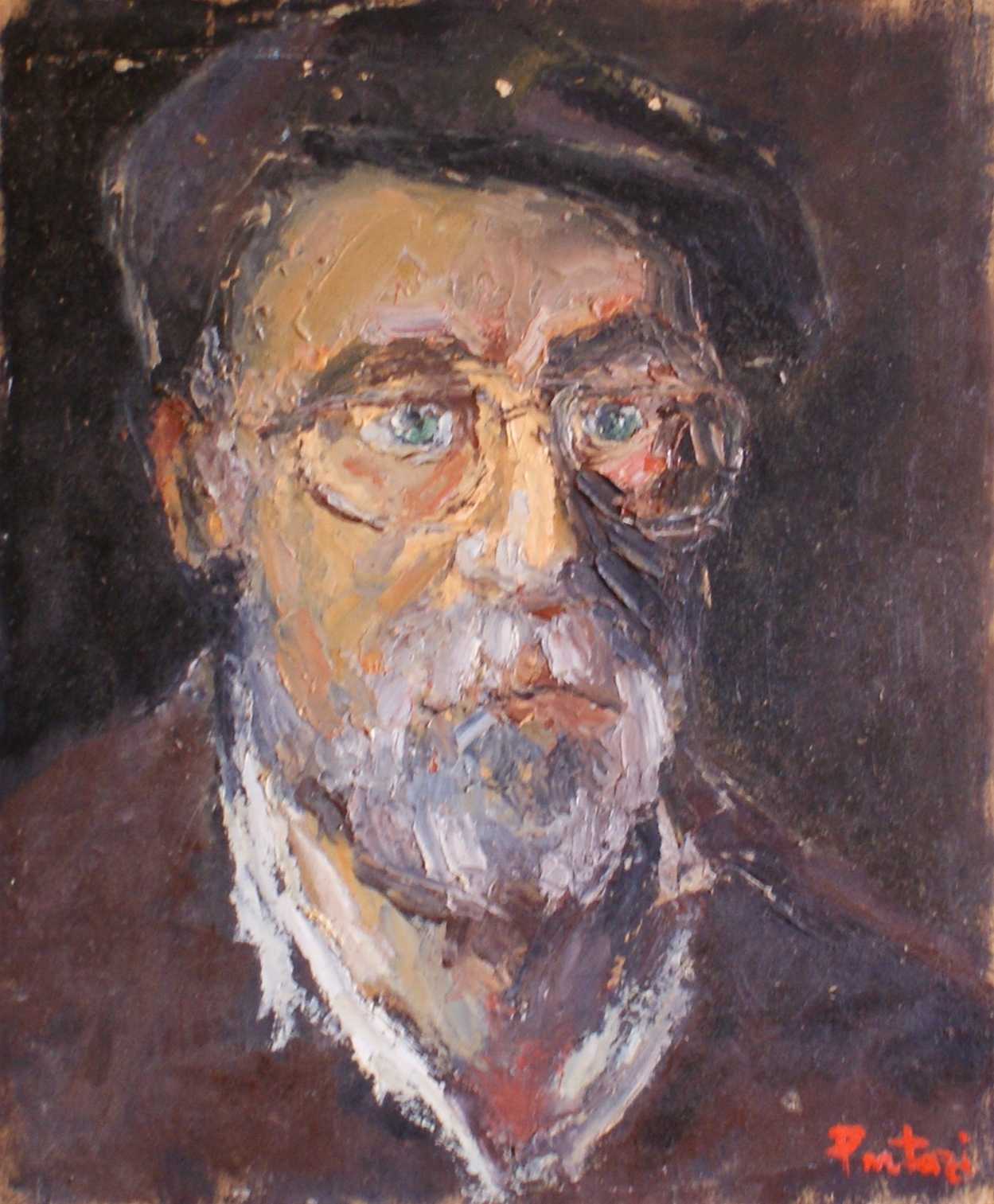
Portrait of the painter Gheorghe Pantelie (2013)

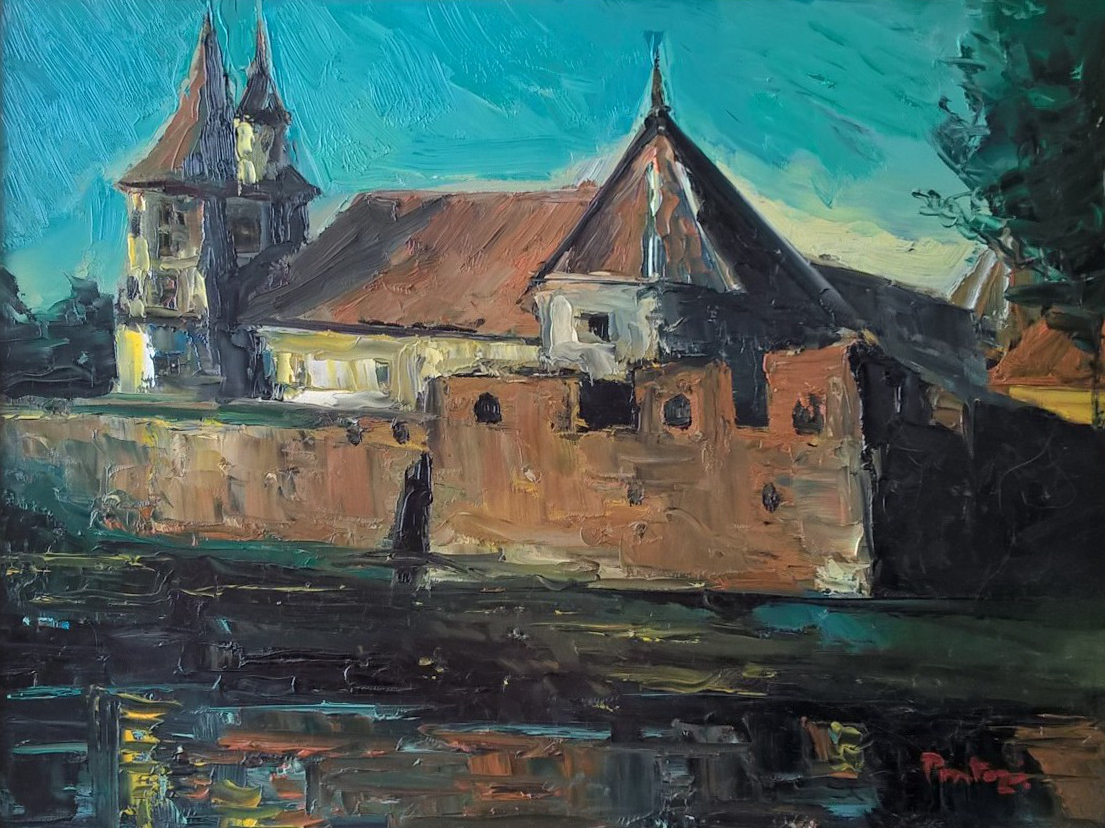
Dusk at Făgăraș Citadel (2013)

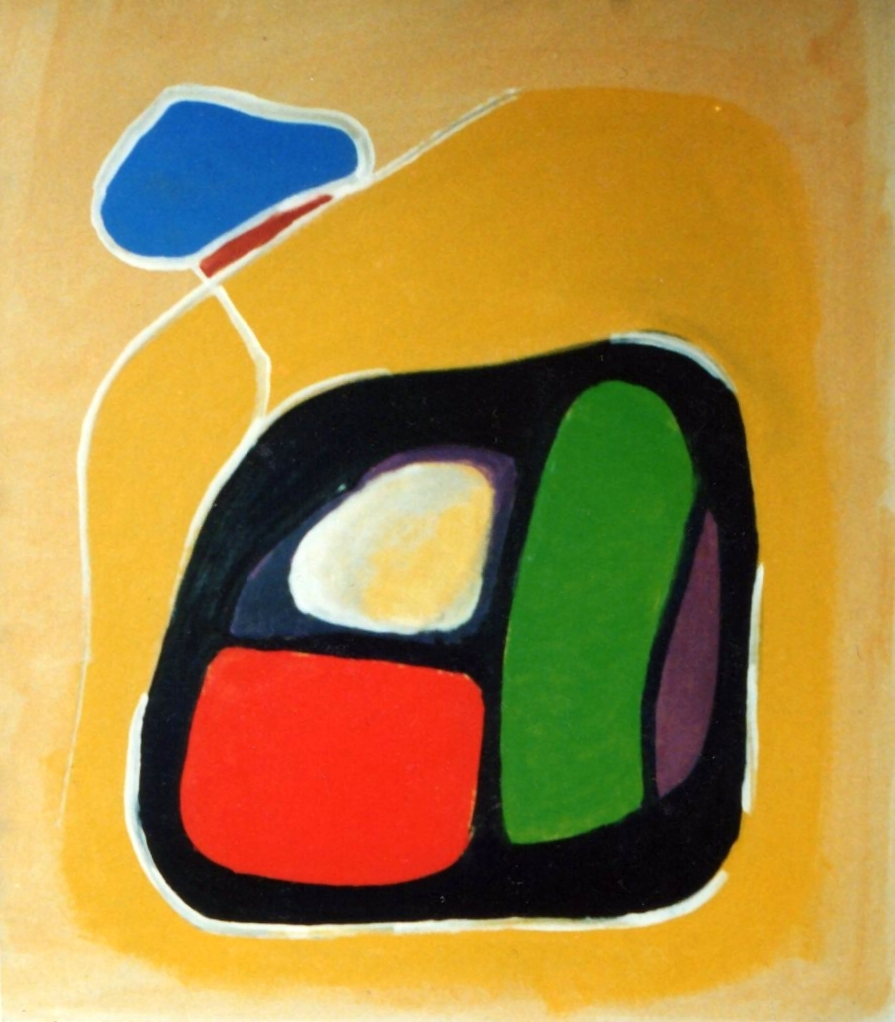
The connection of Heaven with Earth, painted table and sold to the Netherlands (1992)

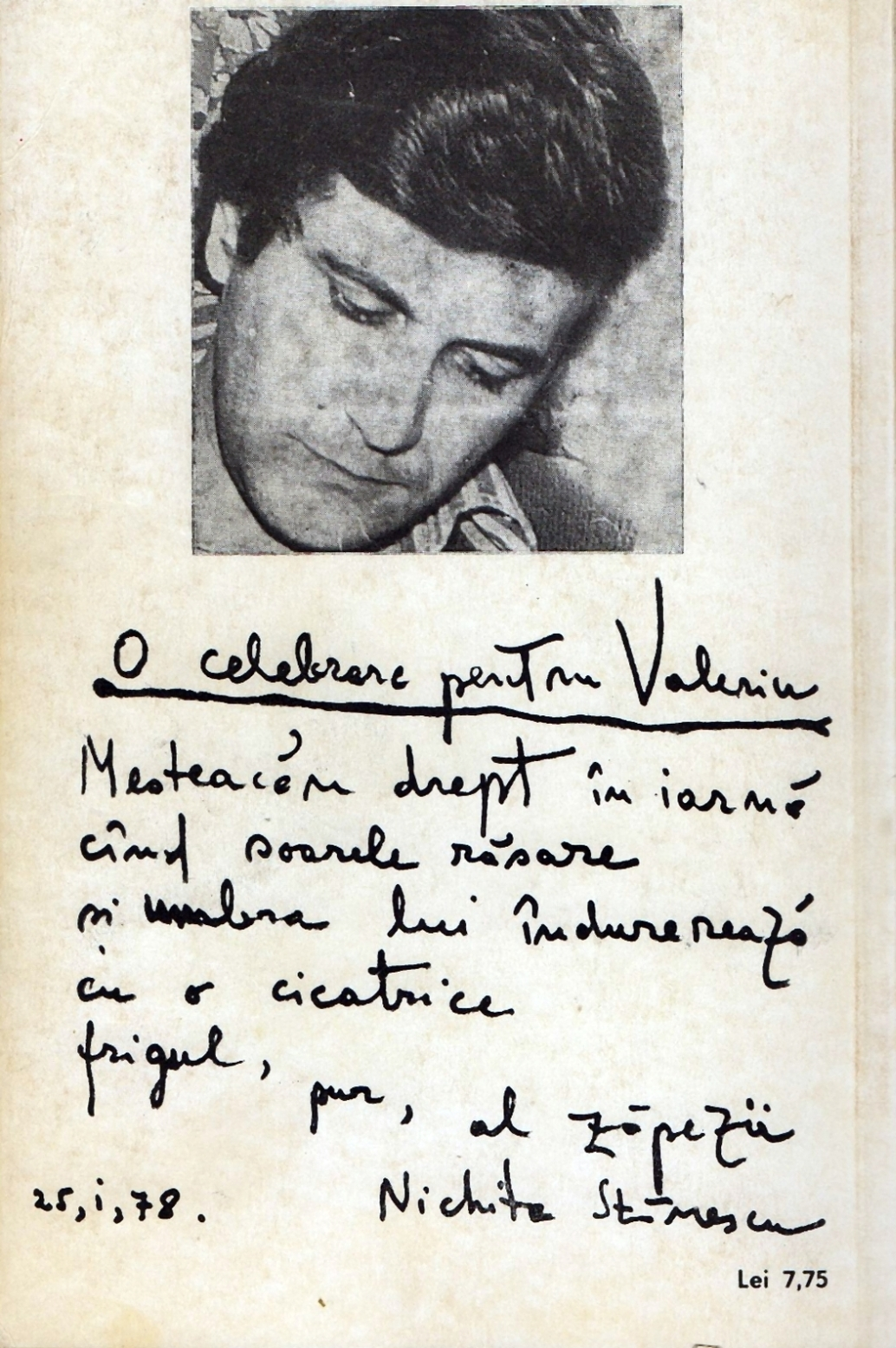
The second volume of coverage to "Celebrări" (1978)

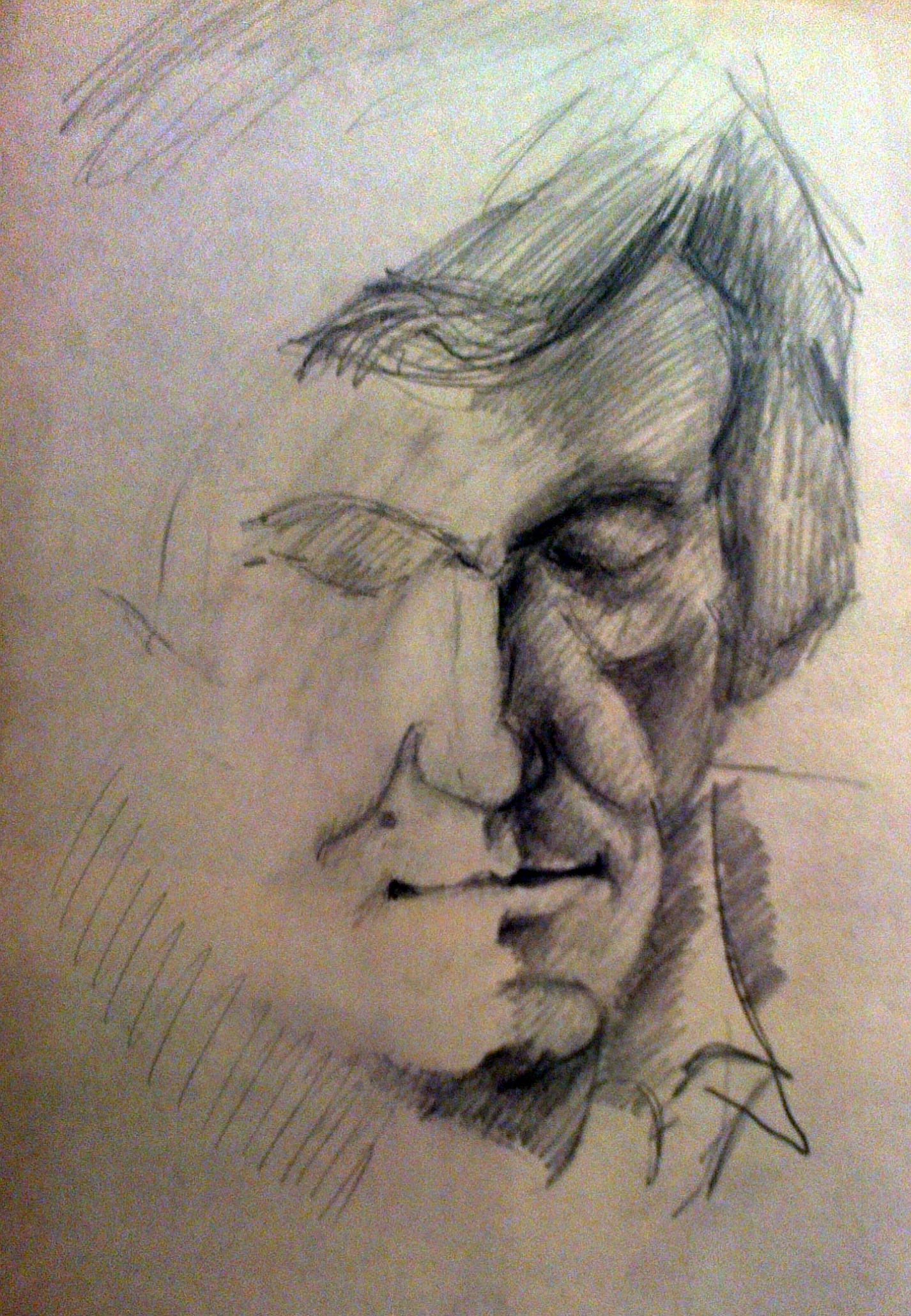
Portrait of Pantazi, by Ion Pantilie

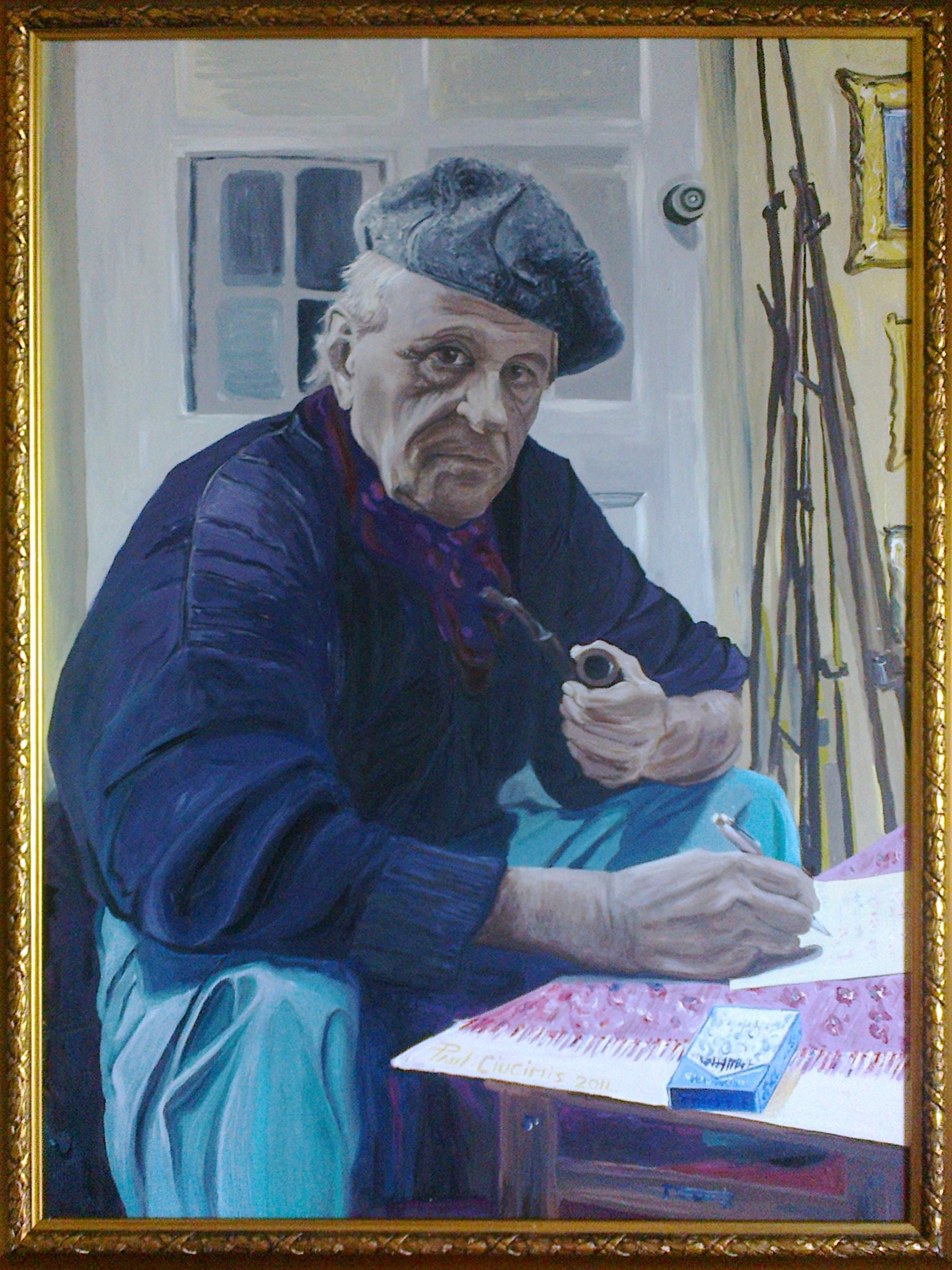
Portrait of Pantazi, by Paul Mecet (2012)

== Bibliography ==
- Constantin Toni Dârțu – Personalități române și faptele lor, 1950 - 2010, volumul 56 (volum de colecție), Editura Studis, Iași, 2013, pp. 442–459, ISBN 978-606-624-002-4
- Eugen Barbu – O istorie polemică și antologică a literaturii române, Editura Eminescu, București, 1976.

Mass-media:

- The weekly magazine of the Writers' Union of Romania – Luceafărul de dimineață, No. 44, December 23, 2009
- The Națiunea weekly, No. 246, April 20, 2004
- The newspaper Dimineața No. 3888, August 12, 2004
