= Nănești =

- Commune
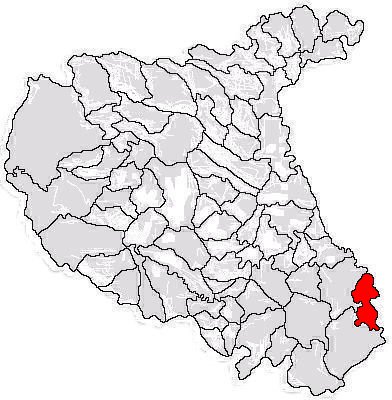
- Location in Vrancea County

- Location in Romania
- Coordinates: 45°33′N 27°30′E
- Country: Romania
- County: Vrancea

Government
  - Mayor (2024–2028): Florin Cezarian Bucșă (PNL)
- Area: 49.51 km^{2} (19.12 sq mi)
- Elevation: 13 m (43 ft)
- Population (2021-12-01): 1,849
  - Density: 37/km^{2} (97/sq mi)
- Time zone: EET/EEST (UTC+2/+3)
- Postal code: 627215
- Area code: +(40) 237
- Vehicle reg.: VN
- Website: www.primariananesti.ro

Nănești is a commune located in Vrancea County, Romania. It is composed of three villages: Călienii Noi, Călienii Vechi, and Nănești.

Historical population
Year	Pop.	±%
2002	2,481	—
2011	2,055	−17.2%
2021	1,849	−10.0%
Source: Census data
