= Andreiașu de Jos =

- Commune
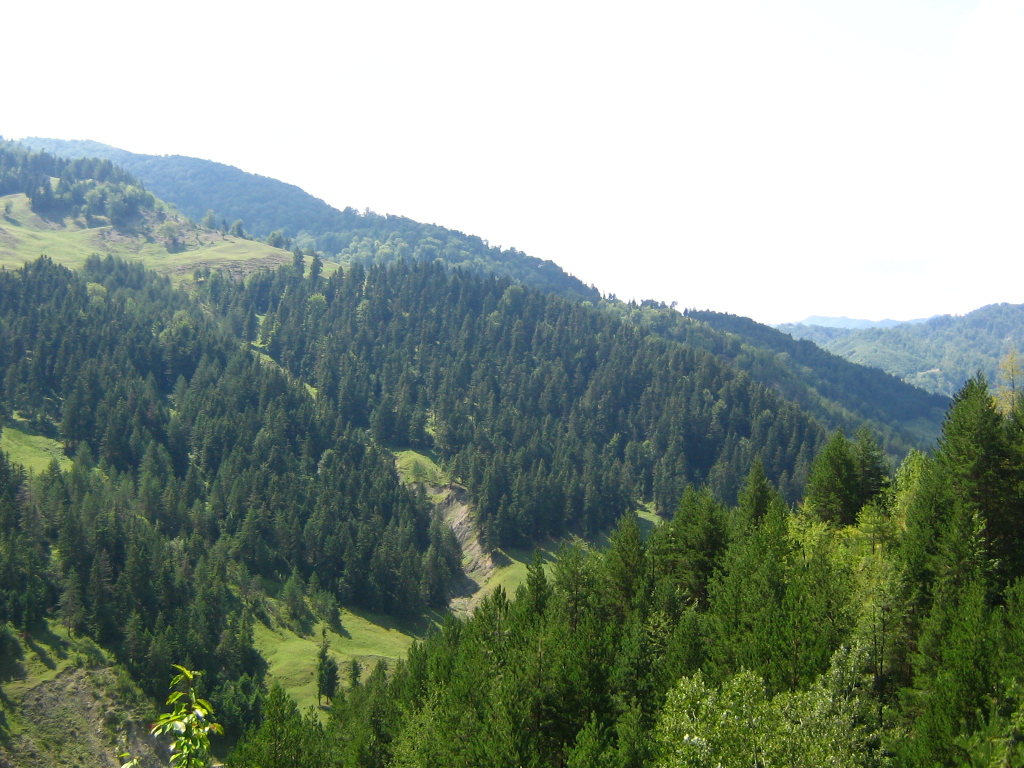
- Focul Viu natural reserve in Andreiașu de Jos

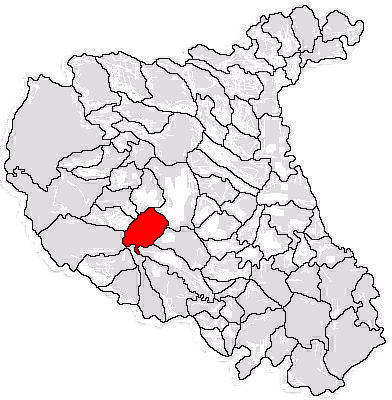
- Location in Vrancea County

- Location in Romania
- Coordinates: 45°45′N 26°50′E
- Country: Romania
- County: Vrancea

Government
  - Mayor (2024–2028): Vasilică Cristian (PSD)
- Area: 103.08 km^{2} (39.80 sq mi)
- Elevation: 493 m (1,617 ft)
- Population (2021-12-01): 1,461
  - Density: 14.17/km^{2} (36.71/sq mi)
- Time zone: UTC+02:00 (EET)
  - Summer (DST): UTC+03:00 (EEST)
- Postal code: 627005
- Area code: +40 x37
- Vehicle reg.: VN
- Website: www.andreiasu.primarievn.ro

Andreiașu de Jos is a commune located in Vrancea County, Muntenia, Romania. It is composed of seven villages: Andreiașu de Jos, Andreiașu de Sus, Arșița, Fetig, Hotaru, Răchitașu, and Titila.

The commune is located in a hilly area, at the foot of the Curvature Carpathians, on the left bank of the Milcov River, the traditional boundary between Wallachia and Moldavia.

Historical population
Year	Pop.	±%
2002	2,008	—
2011	1,655	−17.6%
2021	1,461	−11.7%
Source: Census data
