= Mera, Vrancea =

Mera
- Commune
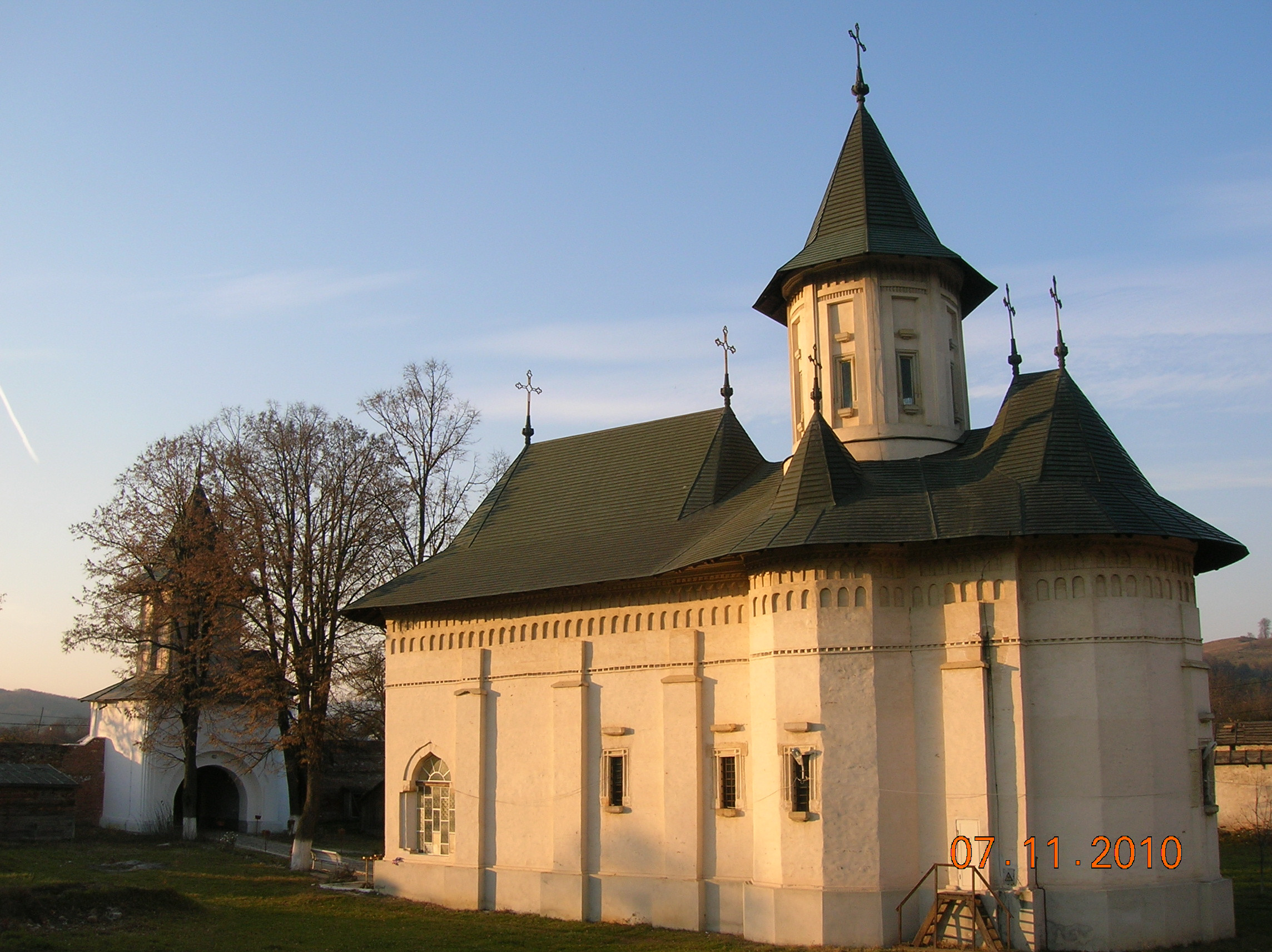
- The church inside Mera monastery

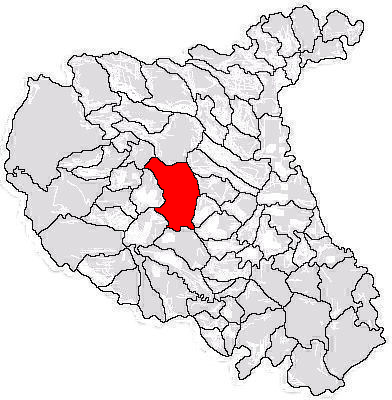
- Location in Vrancea County

- Location in Romania
- Coordinates: 45°46′N 26°56′E
- Country: Romania
- County: Vrancea

Government
  - Mayor (2024–2028): Florin Jan Vasilache (PNL)
- Area: 94.4 km^{2} (36.4 sq mi)
- Elevation: 247 m (810 ft)
- Population (2021-12-01): 3,671
  - Density: 38.9/km^{2} (101/sq mi)
- Time zone: UTC+02:00 (EET)
  - Summer (DST): UTC+03:00 (EEST)
- Postal code: 627200
- Area code: +(40) 237
- Vehicle reg.: VN
- Website: www.mera.primarievn.ro

Mera is a commune in Romania. It is located in Vrancea County. It is composed of five villages: Livada, Mera, Milcovel, Roșioara, and Vulcăneasa.

== Demographics ==
Historical population
Year	Pop.	±%
2002	3,914	—
2011	3,453	−11.8%
2021	3,671	+6.3%
Source: Census data

According to the 2011 National Census data, the commune had 3,453 inhabitants, in decline from 2002, when the census registered 3,914 people. At the 2021 census, Mera had a population of 3,671, of which 93.24% were Romanians.

== History ==
In Mera lies the former Mera monastery, considered a historical monument of national interest. Built in 1685, it is the only religious edifice built by the Moldavian voivode Constantin Cantemir. The complex contains the "Holy Emperors" church, the exterior wall, and administrative buildings.
