= Urechești, Vrancea =

Urechești
- Commune
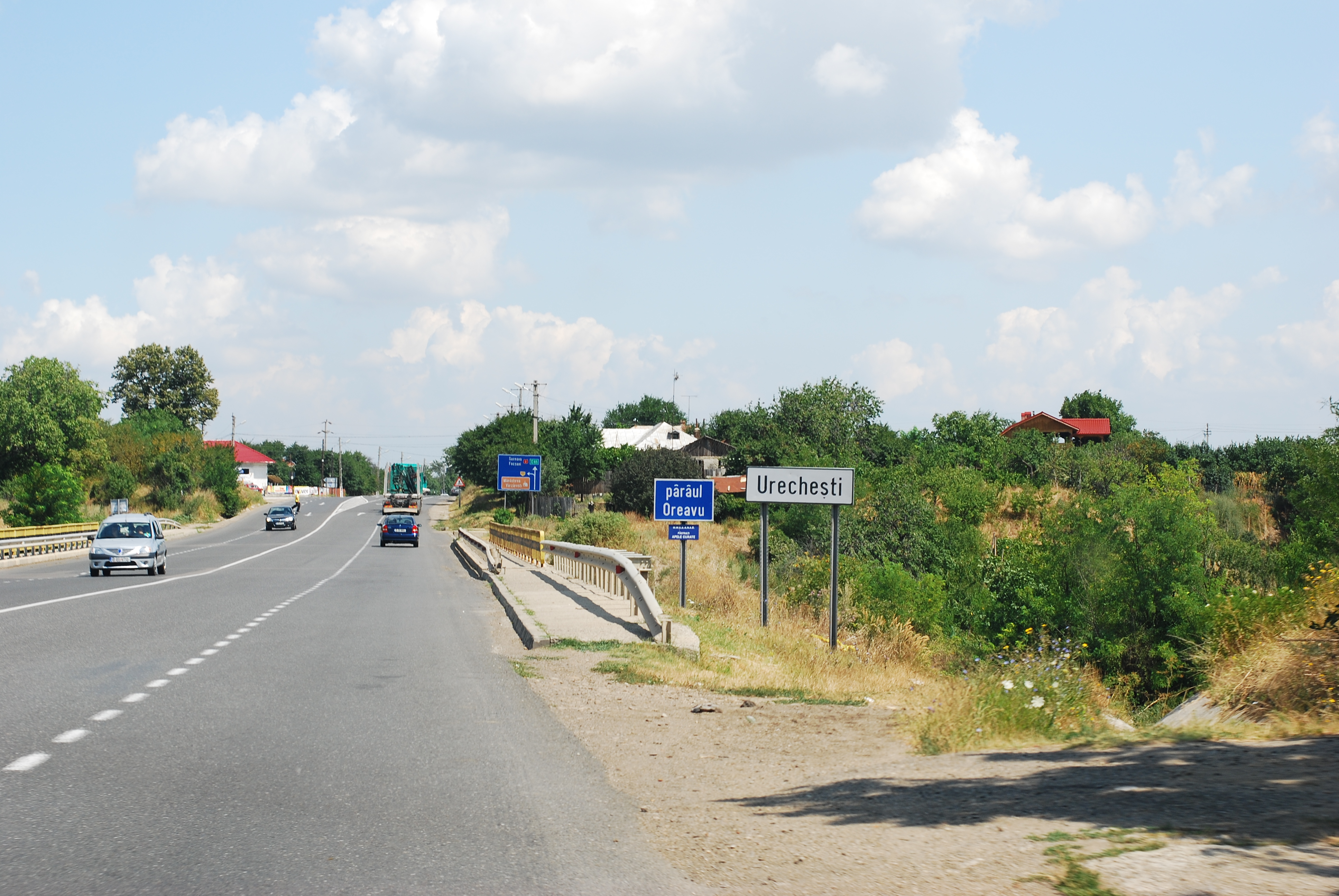
- Entrance in Urechești on DN2

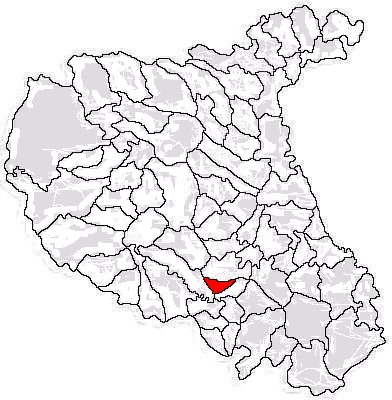
- Location in Vrancea County

- Location in Romania
- Coordinates: 45°36′N 27°04′E
- Country: Romania
- County: Vrancea

Government
  - Mayor (2024–2028): Nistor Bratosin (PNL)
- Area: 17.62 km^{2} (6.80 sq mi)
- Elevation: 155 m (509 ft)
- Population (2021-12-01): 2,783
  - Density: 157.9/km^{2} (409.1/sq mi)
- Time zone: UTC+02:00 (EET)
  - Summer (DST): UTC+03:00 (EEST)
- Postal code: 627385
- Area code: +(40) 237
- Vehicle reg.: VN
- Website: www.primariaurechesti.ro

Urechești is a commune located in Vrancea County, Romania. It is composed of a single village, Urechești. It also included Popești and Terchești villages until 2003, when they were split off to form Popești Commune.

Historical population
Year	Pop.	±%
2002	2,736	—
2011	2,532	−7.5%
2021	2,783	+9.9%
Source: Census data

== Natives ==
- Valeriu Pantazi (1940–2015), poet, writer, and painter
- Angel Tîlvăr (born 1962), politician and current Minister of National Defense
