= Putna-Vrancea Natural Park =

Natural park in Vrancea County Romania

- Parcul Natural Putna-Vrancea
- IUCN category V (protected landscape/seascape)
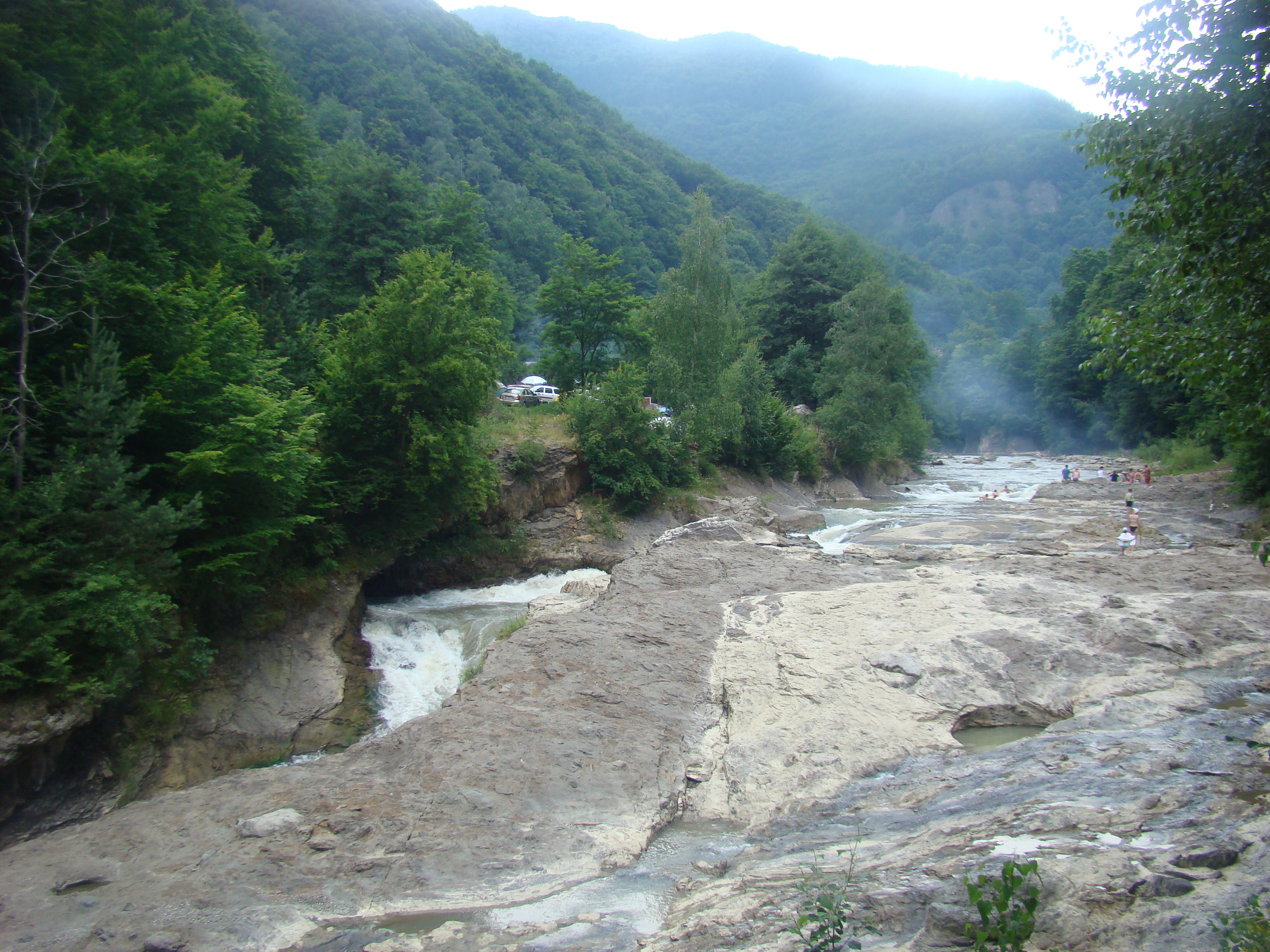
- Putna Waterfall (Putna River)

- Location within Romania
- Location: Romania; Vrancea County
- Nearest city: Târgu Secuiesc
- Coordinates: 45°55′16″N 26°30′11″E
- Area: 30,204 hectares (74,640 acres)
- Established: 2005
- Website: www.putna-vrancea.ro

The Putna-Vrancea Natural Park (Romanian: Parcul Natural Putna-Vrancea) is a protected area (natural park category V IUCN) situated in Romania, in administrative territory of Vrancea County.

== Location ==
The Natural Park is located in the Vrancea Mountains (Eastern Carpathians), in the hydrographical basin of the Putna River. It is situated in the northwestern part of Vrancea County, on the border with Covasna County, and lies on the administrative territories of the communes Nistorești, Păulești, Soveja, and Tulnici. It is traversed by National Road DN2L, which connects Panciu to Lepșa.

== Description ==
The Putna-Vrancea Natural Park, with an area of 26,503 ha (65,490 acres), was declared a natural protected area by the Government Decision Number 2151 of November 30, 2004 (published in the Romanian Official Paper (Monitorul Oficial) Number 38 of January 12, 2005) and represents a mountainous area (crevasses, mountain peaks, valleys, canyons, waterfalls, forests, pastures), with a large variety of flora and fauna.

The nature park overlaps with the Putna-Vrancea site of community Importance as part of the Natura 2000 Network and includes the following nature reserves: Putna Waterfall, Groapa cu Pini, Mount Goru, Lepșa-Zboina Forest, Strâmtura-Coza, and Tișița Valley.

The park has a natural area framed in the Alpine ecoregion, located in the northwestern central sector of the Vrancea Mountains (a geomorphological subunit of the Curvature Carpathians, part of the Eastern Carpathian mountain range), which shelters, protects, and conserves a diverse range of flora and fauna, expressed both at the species level and at the level of terrestrial ecosystems.
