= Popești, Vrancea =

Popești
- Commune
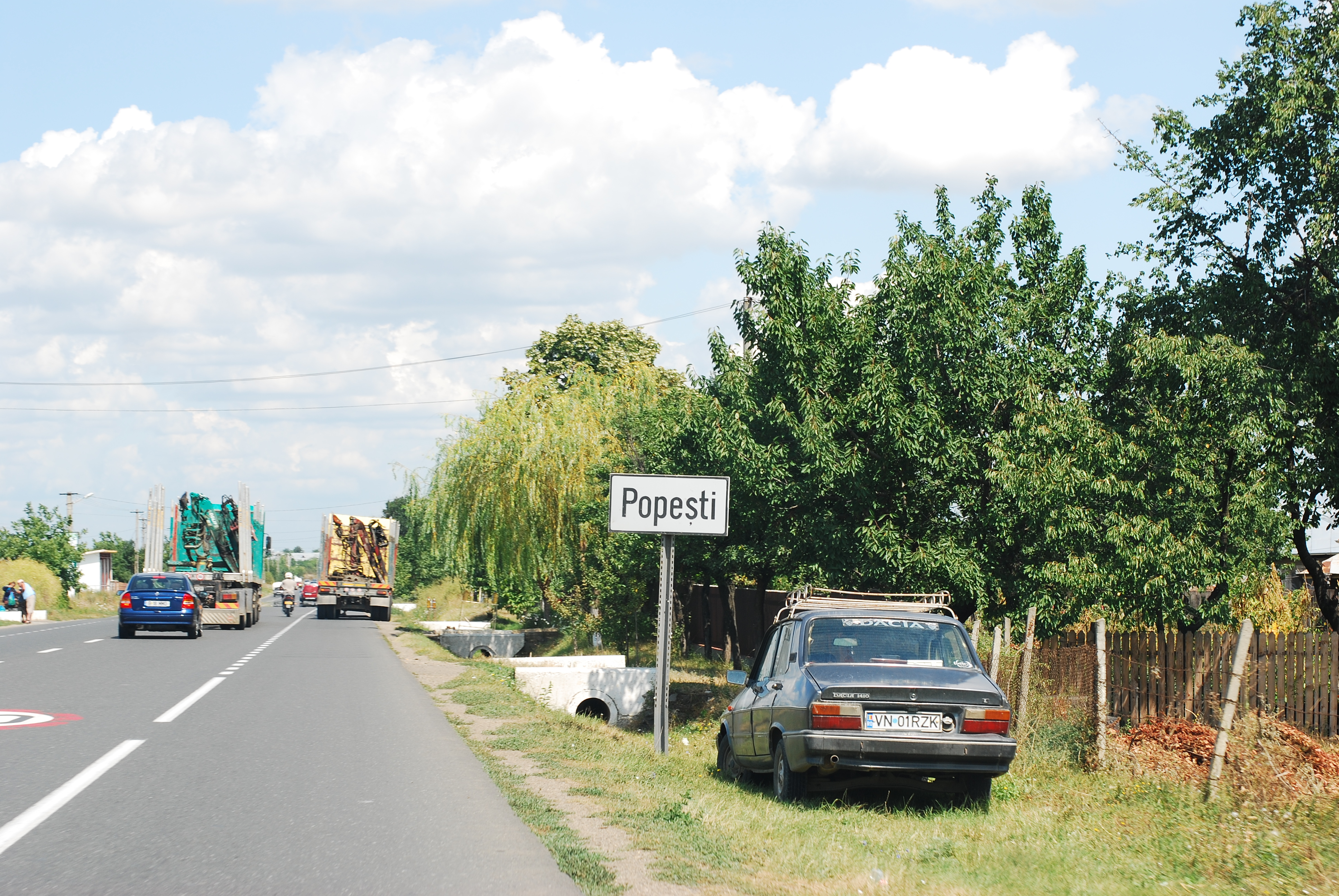
- DN2 entering Popești village

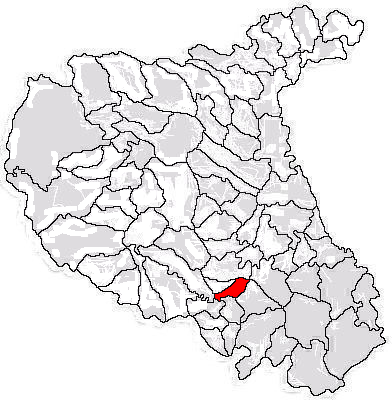
- Location in Vrancea County

- Location in Romania
- Coordinates: 45°35′N 27°06′E
- Country: Romania
- County: Vrancea

Government
  - Mayor (2024–2028): Nicolae Ciocănel (PSD)
- Area: 13.43 km^{2} (5.19 sq mi)
- Elevation: 138 m (453 ft)
- Population (2021-12-01): 2,814
  - Density: 209.5/km^{2} (542.7/sq mi)
- Time zone: UTC+02:00 (EET)
  - Summer (DST): UTC+03:00 (EEST)
- Postal code: 627386
- Area code: +(40) 237
- Vehicle reg.: VN
- Website: www.primariapopestivn.ro

Popești is a commune located in Vrancea County, Romania. It is composed of two villages, Popești and Terchești. These were part of Urechești Commune until 2003, when they were split off.

Historical population
Year	Pop.	±%
2002	3,103	—
2011	2,753	−11.3%
2021	2,814	+2.2%
Source: Census data
