= Poiana Cristei =

- Commune
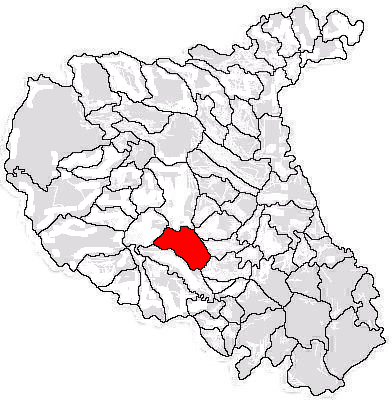
- Location in Vrancea County

- Location in Romania
- Coordinates: 45°39′N 26°59′E
- Country: Romania
- County: Vrancea

Government
  - Mayor (2024–2028): Petruș Vlad (PSD)
- Area: 53.6 km^{2} (20.7 sq mi)
- Elevation: 370 m (1,210 ft)
- Population (2021-12-01): 2,618
  - Density: 49/km^{2} (130/sq mi)
- Time zone: EET/EEST (UTC+2/+3)
- Postal code: 627265
- Area code: +(40) 237
- Vehicle reg.: VN
- Website: www.primariapoianacristeivn.ro

Poiana Cristei is a commune located in Vrancea County, Romania. It is composed of eight villages: Dealu Cucului, Dumbrava, Mahriu, Odobasca, Petreanu, Podu Lacului, Poiana Cristei, and Târâtu.

Historical population
Year	Pop.	±%
2002	2,778	—
2011	2,650	−4.6%
2021	2,618	−1.2%
Source: Census data
