= Păunești =

Păuneşti
- Commune
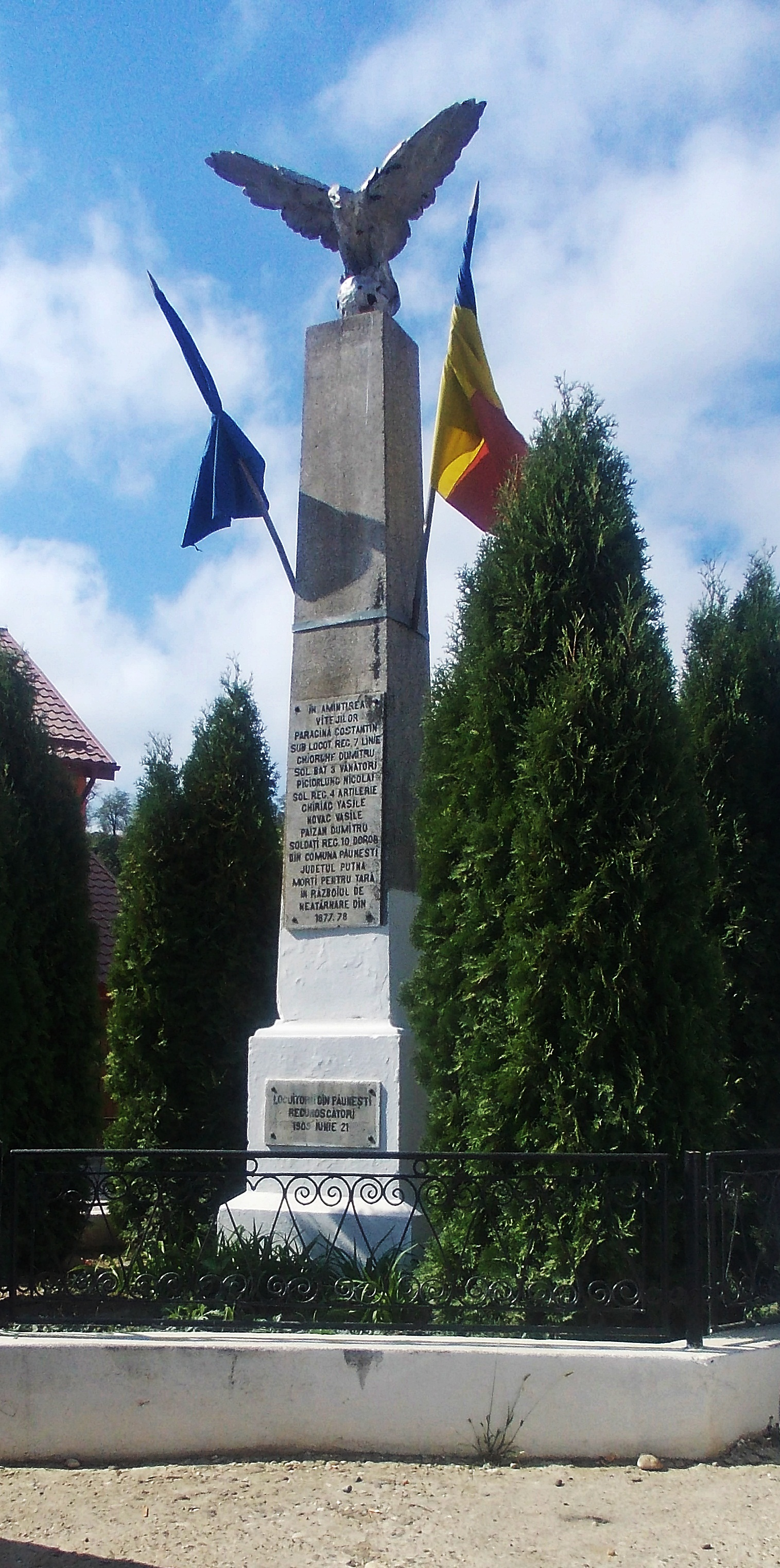
- Heroes Monument

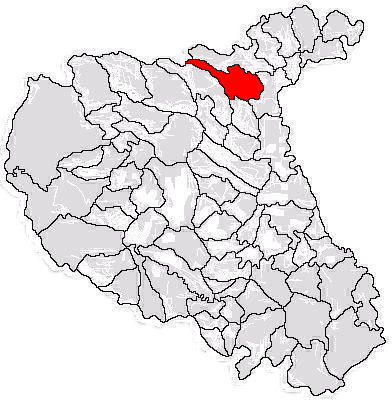
- Location in Vrancea County

- Location in Romania
- Coordinates: 46°02′N 27°07′E
- Country: Romania
- County: Vrancea

Government
  - Mayor (2024–2028): Gheorghe Popa (PNL)
- Area: 73 km^{2} (28 sq mi)
- Elevation: 249 m (817 ft)
- Population (2021-12-01): 5,923
  - Density: 81/km^{2} (210/sq mi)
- Time zone: UTC+02:00 (EET)
  - Summer (DST): UTC+03:00 (EEST)
- Postal code: 627260
- Area code: +(40) 237
- Vehicle reg.: VN
- Website: www.paunesti.ro

Păunești is a commune located in Vrancea County, Romania. It is composed of two villages, Păunești and Viișoara.

Historical population
Year	Pop.	±%
2002	6,724	—
2011	5,898	−12.3%
2021	5,923	+0.4%
Source: Census data

== Natives ==
- Cicerone Manolache (1936–2024), footballer and manager
