= Ploscuțeni =

- Commune
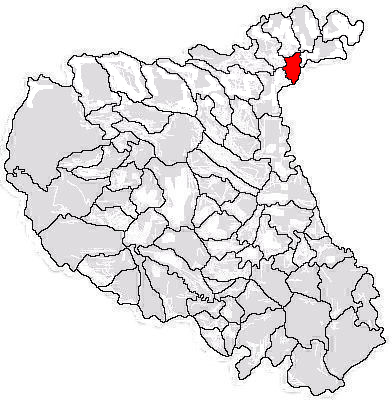
- Location in Vrancea County

- Location in Romania
- Coordinates: 46°5′N 27°16′E
- Country: Romania
- County: Vrancea

Government
  - Mayor (2024–2028): Ștefan Solomon (PSD)
- Area: 12.31 km^{2} (4.75 sq mi)
- Elevation: 87 m (285 ft)
- Population (2021-12-01): 2,672
  - Density: 220/km^{2} (560/sq mi)
- Time zone: EET/EEST (UTC+2/+3)
- Postal code: 627179
- Area code: +(40) 237
- Vehicle reg.: VN
- Website: www.primaria-ploscuteni.ro

Ploscuțeni is a commune located in Vrancea County, Romania. It is composed of two villages, Argea and Ploscuțeni.

== Demographics ==
Historical population
Year	Pop.	±%
2002	3,073	—
2011	3,114	+1.3%
2021	2,672	−14.2%
Source: Census data

At the 2011 census, Ploscuțeni had a population of 3,114; of the inhabitants for whom data were available, 99.9% were Romanians; 72.3% were Roman Catholic and 27.6% Romanian Orthodox. At the 2021 census, the commune had a population of 2,672; of those, 92.18% were Romanians, while for 7.75% the ethnicity was not known.
