= Movilița, Vrancea =

Movilița
- Commune
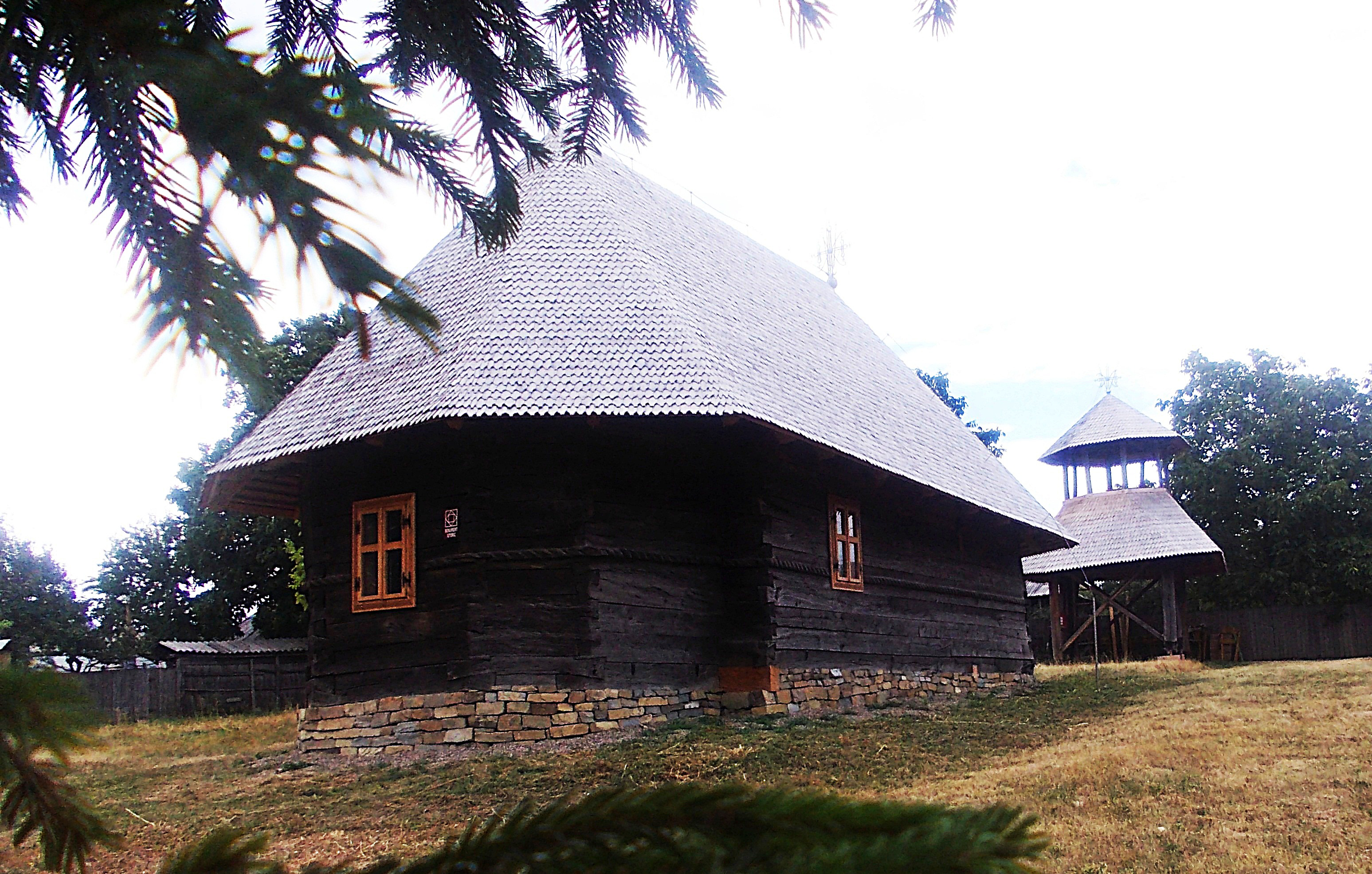
- St. John The Baptist Church in Movilița

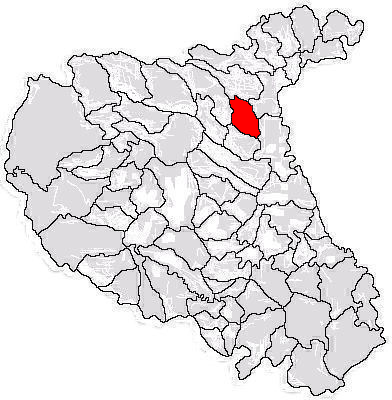
- Location in Vrancea County

- Location in Romania
- Coordinates: 45°57′N 27°06′E
- Country: Romania
- County: Vrancea

Government
  - Mayor (2024–2028): Adrian Grigoraș (USR)
- Area: 50.04 km^{2} (19.32 sq mi)
- Elevation: 227 m (745 ft)
- Population (2021-12-01): 3,476
  - Density: 69.46/km^{2} (179.9/sq mi)
- Time zone: UTC+02:00 (EET)
  - Summer (DST): UTC+03:00 (EEST)
- Postal code: 627210
- Area code: +(40) 237
- Vehicle reg.: VN
- Website: www.movilita.primarievn.ro

Movilița is a commune located in Vrancea County, Romania. It is composed of five villages: Diocheți-Rediu, Frecăței, Movilița, Trotușanu, and Văleni.

Historical population
Year	Pop.	±%
2002	3,962	—
2011	3,183	−19.7%
2021	3,476	+9.2%
Source: Census data
