= Fitionești =

- Commune
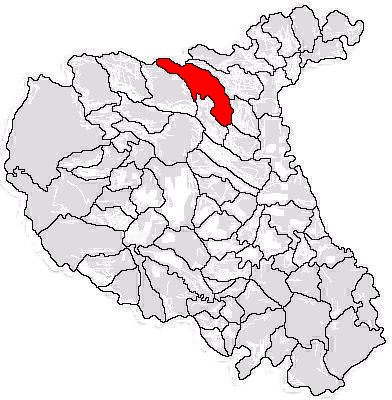
- Location in Vrancea County

- Location in Romania
- Coordinates: 45°59′N 27°03′E
- Country: Romania
- County: Vrancea

Government
  - Mayor (2024–2028): Iordache Cazacu (PSD)
- Area: 79.45 km^{2} (30.68 sq mi)
- Elevation: 251 m (823 ft)
- Population (2021-12-01): 2,318
  - Density: 29/km^{2} (76/sq mi)
- Time zone: EET/EEST (UTC+2/+3)
- Postal code: 627135
- Area code: +(40) 237
- Vehicle reg.: VN
- Website: www.fitionesti.ro

Fitionești is a commune in the center-north hill area of Vrancea County, Western Moldavia, Romania, with a population of 2,318 as of 2021. The commune is composed of five villages: Ciolănești, Fitionești, Ghimicești, Holbănești, and Mănăstioara. Fitionești is said to have taken its name from the Fetion family, an old family of local boyars. The first historical evidence dates back to the Thracian Bronze Age.

== Geography ==
The river Zăbrăuț crosses the village that lies between two hills, surrounded by wooden areas. Fitionești has a varied relief: Bouroș(u) Hill to the East, Valea Rea Valley to the West, followed by Costin Hill; also, Pisc Hill (Pi Chisc) to the northwest, and Ursoaia. Twenty kilometres north of Fitionești, after Glodișteanu Woods, there is Moșinoaiele Monastery (Moșânoaia). These surroundings are proper for (agro)tourism.

The closest town is Panciu, ten kilometres to the South-East, which is virtually the only access way to "civilization", historically also referred to as "la Vale" ("to the fields"). Another neighboring commune is Movilița, to the North-East. To the west, beyond Valea Rea and Costin hill, there is Muncelu village (Străoane commune).

== Economy ==
The inhabitants are mostly farmers. They mainly cultivate maize, beans, and potatoes, also onion, cabbage, radishes, tomatoes, and cucumbers. There are also many vineyards (part of the Panciu vineyard) and orchards in Fitionești. Plums, apples, pears, and sour-cherries are most popular. Also they raise poultry (chicken, geese, ducks, sometimes turkeys), sheep, and cows. They keep horses (they still use them for farming work like ploughing), dogs, and cats.

They produce wine and rachiu (a strong alcoholic drink), cheese, and make some of their clothes at home by hand. Also, some popular home manufacture includes soap, carpets, and brooms, usually for family use, not for selling.

== Social facts ==
- Literacy: some old people are illiterate
- Ethnicity: In 2002, all inhabitants except two (a German and a Hungarian) were ethnic Romanians
- Religion: 2,803 Romanian Orthodox, 5 Roman Catholics, and 51 Protestants
- Institutions: Căminul Cultural, one communal library, four elementary schools (pupils go on to attend the Ioan Slavici High School in Panciu)
- Places of interest: the Moșinoaiele (or Mușinoaiele) Monastery dedicated to the Ascension of the Holy Virgin, located 20 km from the village. The Mușunoaiele hunting fund (boars, brown bears, deer, does, and foxes).

Historical population
Year	Pop.	±%
2002	2,859	—
2011	2,286	−20.0%
2021	2,318	+1.4%
Source: Census data
