= Jariștea =

- Commune
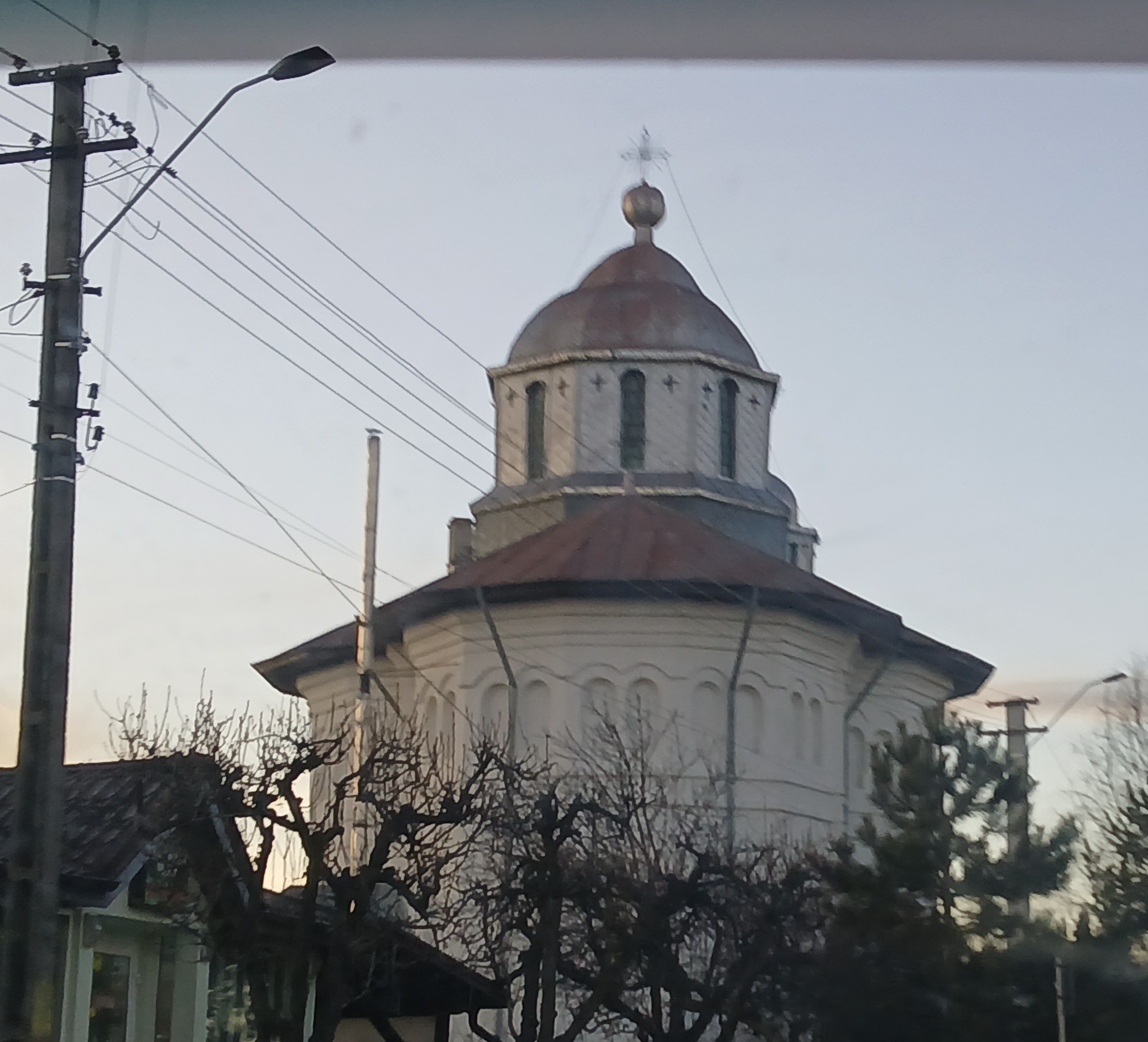
- Orthodox Church in Jariștea

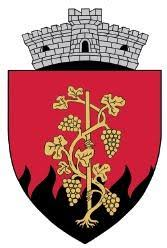
- Coat of arms

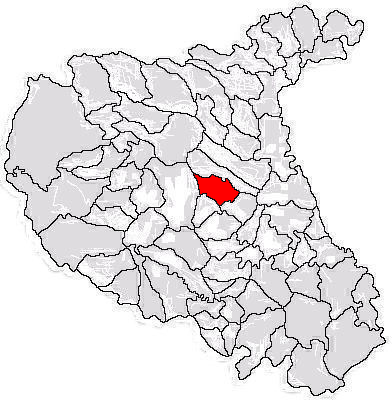
- Location in Vrancea County

- Location in Romania
- Coordinates: 45°47′N 27°4′E
- Country: Romania
- County: Vrancea

Government
  - Mayor (2024–2028): Ciprian Marius Grama (PNL)
- Area: 38.69 km^{2} (14.94 sq mi)
- Elevation: 160 m (520 ft)
- Population (2021-12-01): 4,027
  - Density: 104.1/km^{2} (269.6/sq mi)
- Time zone: UTC+02:00 (EET)
  - Summer (DST): UTC+03:00 (EEST)
- Postal code: 627180
- Area code: +(40) 237
- Vehicle reg.: VN
- Website: primariajaristea.ro

Jariștea is a commune located in Vrancea County, Romania. It is composed of four villages: Jariștea, Pădureni, Scânteia, and Vărsătura.

The Buluc Monastery is in the commune.

Historical population
Year	Pop.	±%
2002	4,070	—
2011	4,204	+3.3%
2021	4,027	−4.2%
Source: Census data
