= Bordești =

- Commune
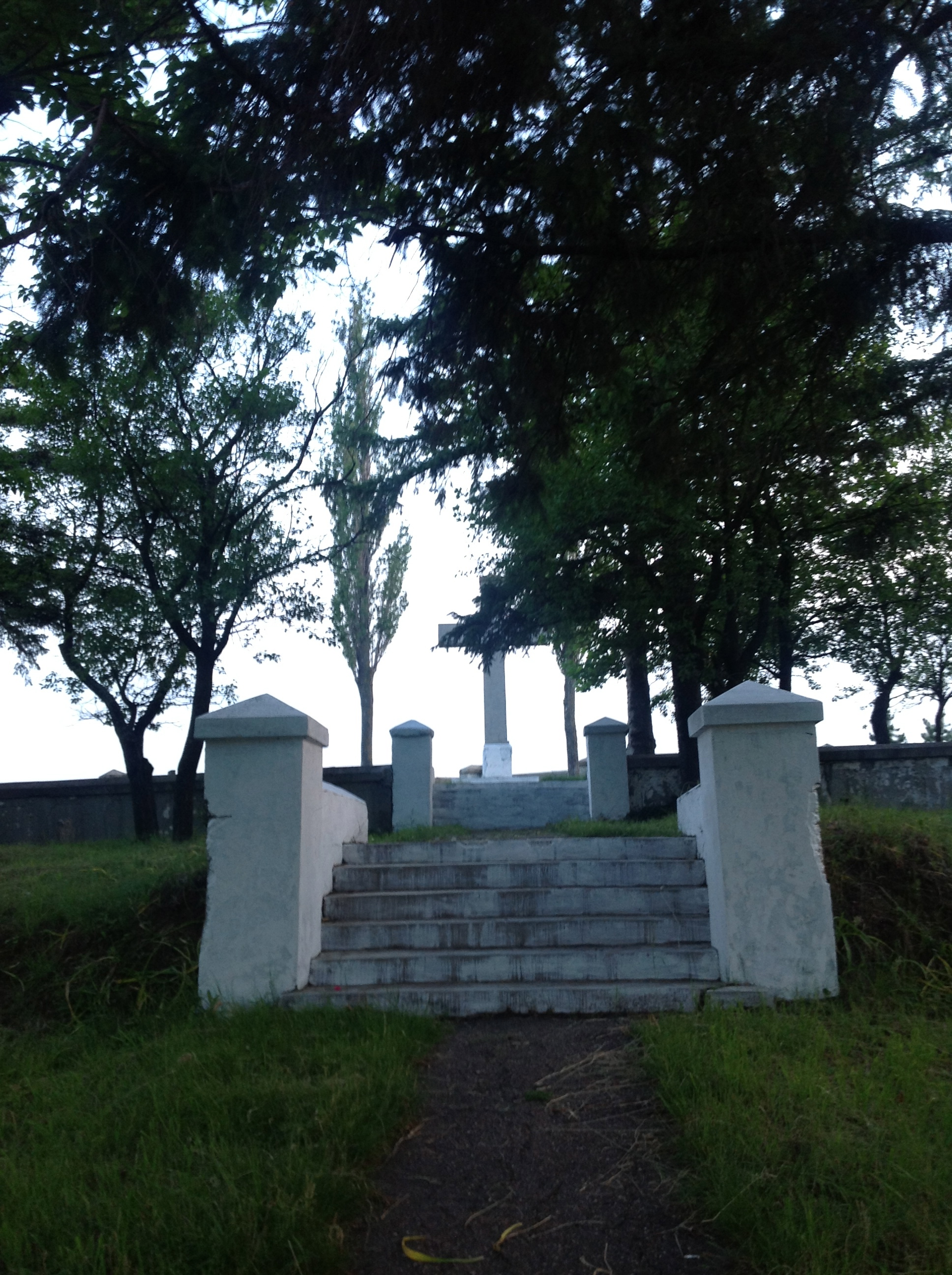
- Romanian and German Soldiers‘ Cemetery (1916–1919) in Bordești

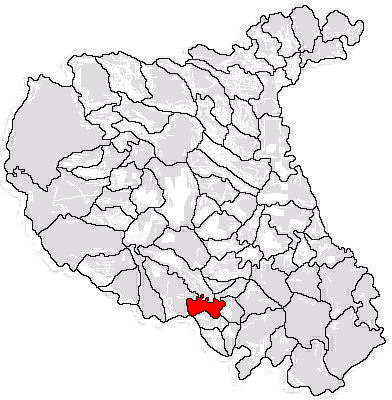
- Location in Vrancea County

- Location in Romania
- Coordinates: 45°33′N 27°02′E
- Country: Romania
- County: Vrancea

Government
  - Mayor (2024–2028): Adrian Gavrilă (PNL)
- Area: 12.9 km^{2} (5.0 sq mi)
- Elevation: 255 m (837 ft)
- Population (2021-12-01): 1,584
  - Density: 123/km^{2} (318/sq mi)
- Time zone: UTC+02:00 (EET)
  - Summer (DST): UTC+03:00 (EEST)
- Postal code: 627045
- Area code: +(40) x37
- Vehicle reg.: VN
- Website: www.comunabordesti.ro

Bordești is a commune located in Vrancea County, Romania. It is composed of two villages, Bordești and Bordeștii de Jos.

Historical population
Year	Pop.	±%
2002	1,799	—
2011	1,683	−6.4%
2021	1,584	−5.9%
Source: Census data
