= Pufești =

- Commune
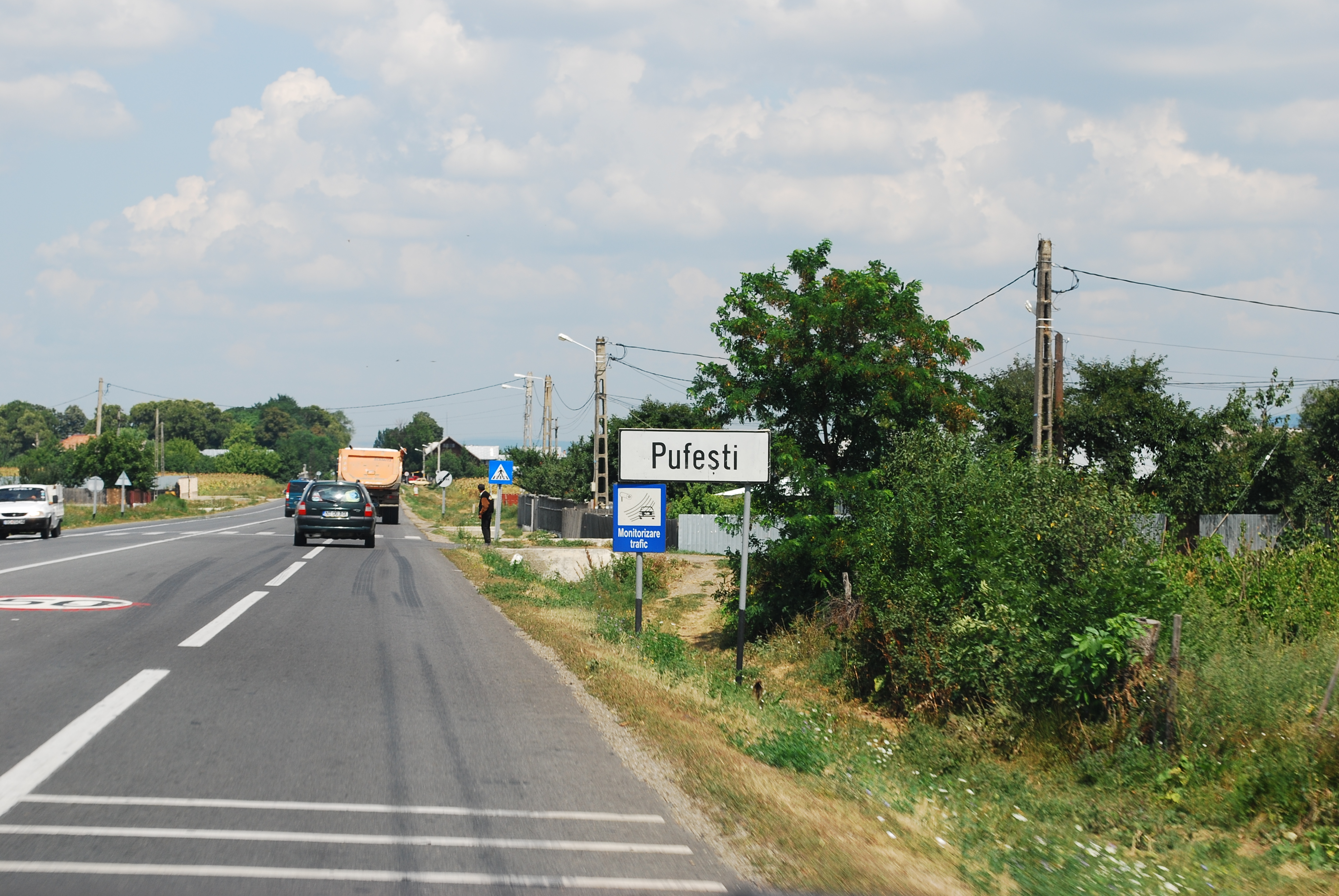
- DN2 entering the village of Pufești

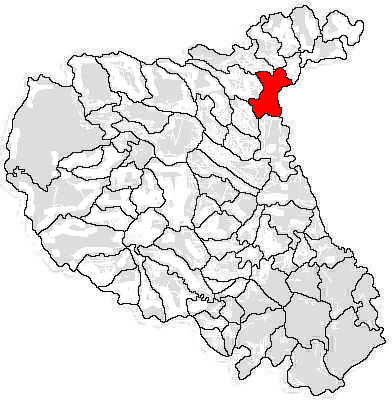
- Location in Vrancea County

- Location in Romania
- Coordinates: 46°00′N 27°12′E
- Country: Romania
- County: Vrancea

Government
  - Mayor (2024–2028): Nicolae Damian (PSD)
- Area: 56.42 km^{2} (21.78 sq mi)
- Elevation: 86 m (282 ft)
- Population (2021-12-01): 4,174
  - Density: 73.98/km^{2} (191.6/sq mi)
- Time zone: UTC+02:00 (EET)
  - Summer (DST): UTC+03:00 (EEST)
- Postal code: 627275
- Area code: +(40) 237
- Vehicle reg.: VN
- Website: primariapufesti.ro

Pufești is a commune located in Vrancea County, Romania. It is composed of four villages: Ciorani, Domnești-Sat, Domnești-Târg, and Pufești.

The commune is located in the northeastern part of Vrancea County, 36 km (22 mi) north of the county seat, Focșani, on the border with Galați County. It lies on the right bank of the Siret River and its tributaries, the Trotuș and Carecna.

The Domnești Princely Church is located in Domnești-Târg.

Historical population
Year	Pop.	±%
2002	4,196	—
2011	3,646	−13.1%
2021	4,174	+14.5%
Source: Census data

== Area ==
It has an area of 56.85 square kilometers.

== Natives ==
- Neculai Munteanu (born 1941), dissident
