= Țifești =

- Commune
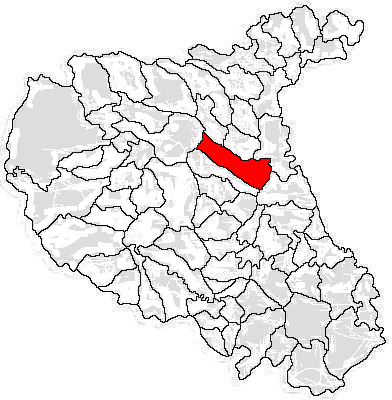
- Location in Vrancea County

- Location in Romania
- Coordinates: 45°51′N 27°06′E
- Country: Romania
- County: Vrancea

Government
  - Mayor (2024–2028): Gabriel Postolache (PNL)
- Area: 77.75 km^{2} (30.02 sq mi)
- Elevation: 175 m (574 ft)
- Population (2021-12-01): 5,028
  - Density: 65/km^{2} (170/sq mi)
- Time zone: EET/EEST (UTC+2/+3)
- Postal code: 627375
- Area code: +(40) 237
- Vehicle reg.: VN
- Website: www.primariatifesti.ro

Țifești is a commune located in Vrancea County, Western Moldavia, Romania. It is composed of eight villages: Bătinești, Clipicești, Igești, Oleșești, Pătrășcani, Sârbi, Țifești, and Vitănești.

Historical population
Year	Pop.	±%
2002	5,199	—
2011	5,197	−0.0%
2021	5,028	−3.3%
Source: Census data
