= Vrancea County =

County of Romania

Vrancea County Județul Vrancea
- County
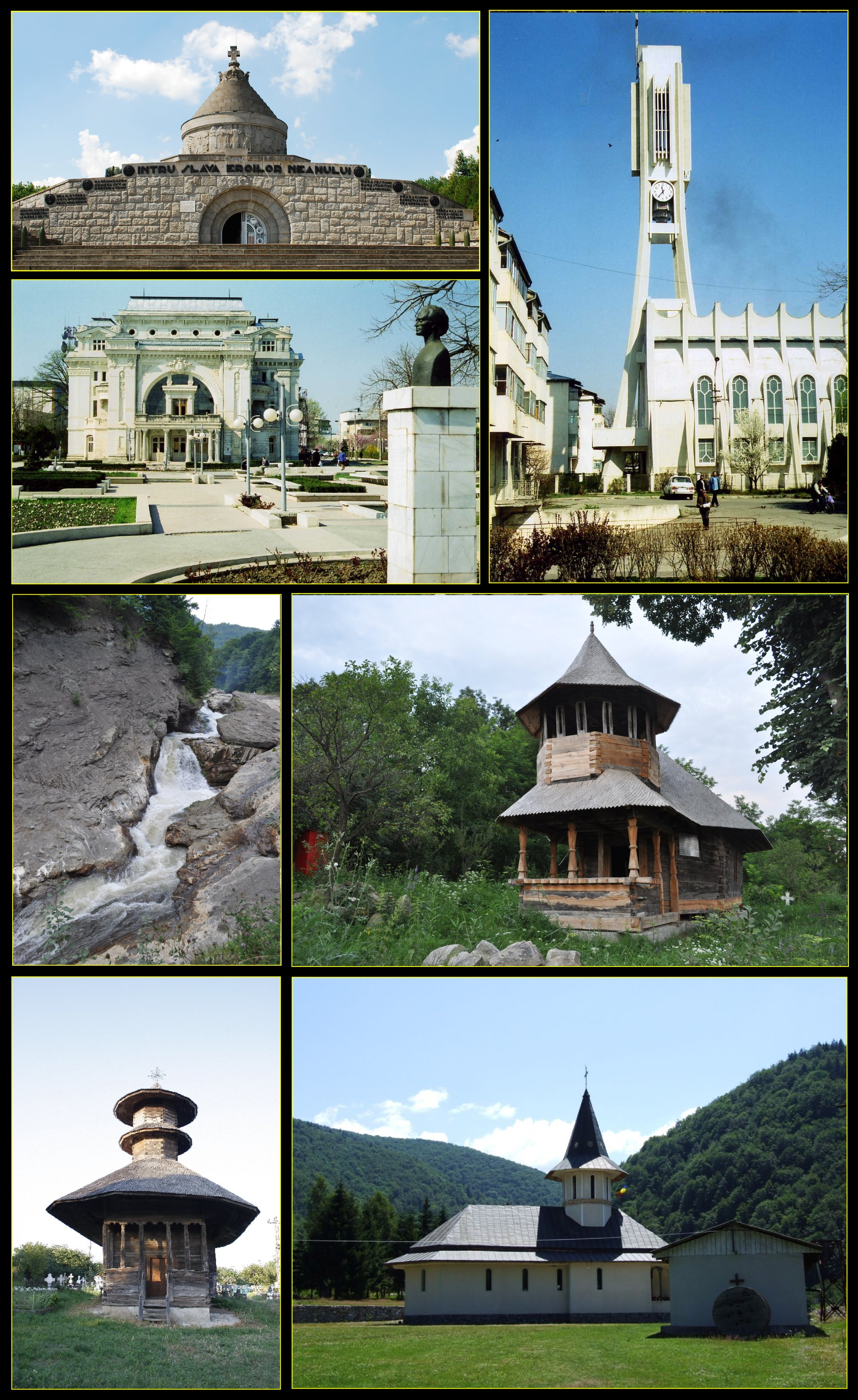

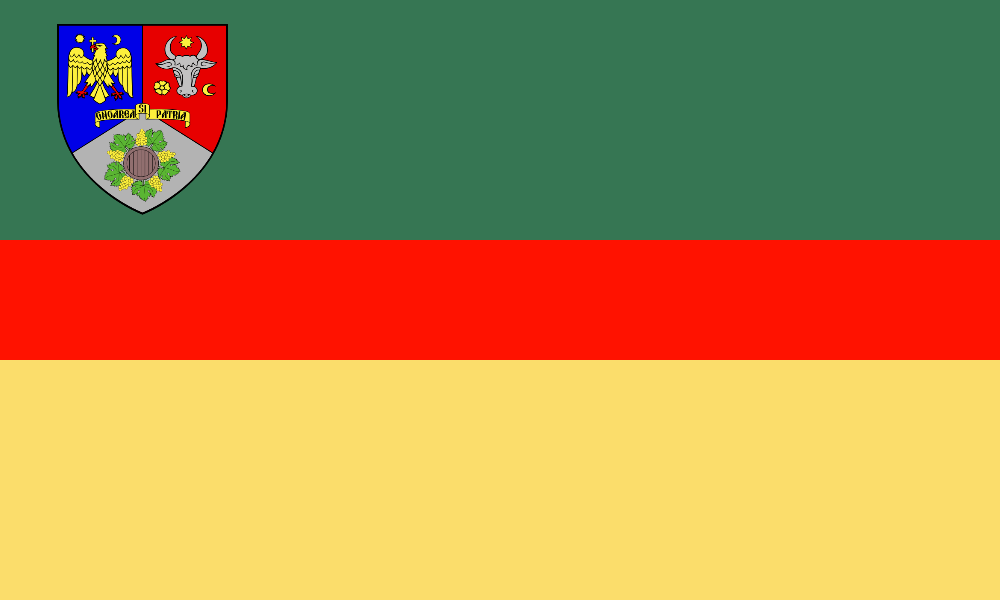
- Flag Coat of arms

- Coordinates: 45.79°N 26.97°E
- Country: Romania
- Development region: Sud-Est
- Historical region: Western Moldavia, Muntenia
- Capital: Focșani

Government
  - President of the County Board: Nicușor Halici (PSD)
  - Prefect: Marius–Eusebiu Iorga

Area
  - Total: 4,857 km^{2} (1,875 sq mi)
  - Rank: 31st

Population (2021-12-01)
  - Total: 335,312
  - Rank: 31st
  - Density: 69.04/km^{2} (178.8/sq mi)
- Telephone code: (+40) 237 or (+40) 337
- ISO 3166 code: RO-VN
- GDP (nominal): US$ 1.82 billion (2015)
- GDP per capita: US$ 5,352 (2015)
- Website: County Council; County Prefecture

Vrancea (Romanian pronunciation: [ˈvrant͡ʃe̯a]) is a county (județ) in Romania, with its seat at Focșani. It is mostly in the historical region of Moldavia but the southern part, below the Milcov River, is in Muntenia.

== Demographics ==
At the 2021 census, the county had a population of 335,312 and a population density of 69.0/km^{2} (178.8/sq mi).

- Romanians – over 98%
- Romani, others – c. 2%.

Year	County population
1948	290,183
1956	326,532 ▲
1966	351,292 ▲
1977	369,740 ▲
1992	392,651 ▲
2002	387,632 ▼
2011	340,310 ▼
2021	335,312 ▼

== Geography ==
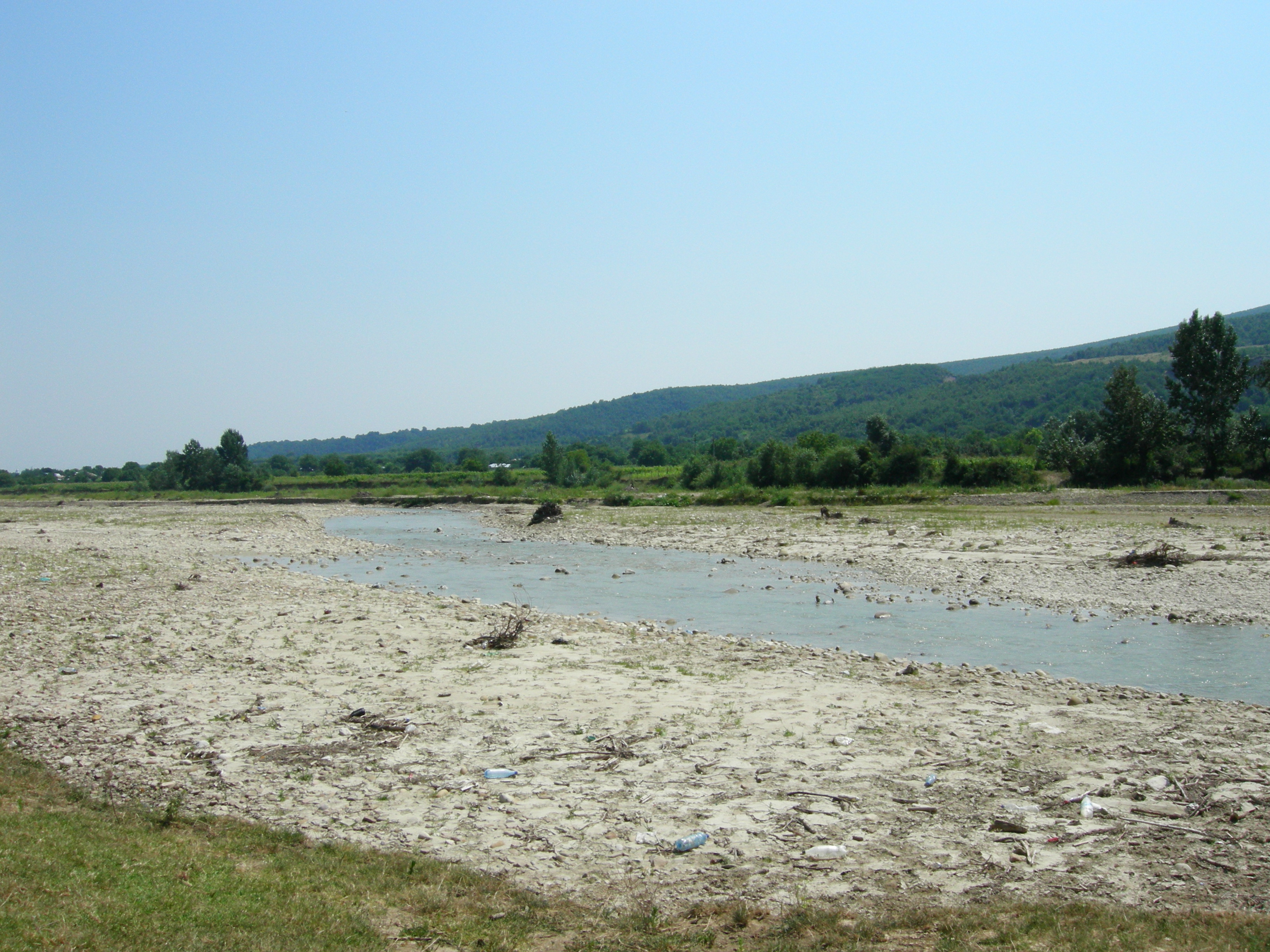
Hills near the Milcov River, which divides Moldavia from Muntenia.

Vrancea County covers an area of 4,857 km^{2} (1,875 sq mi). A curvedly shaped mountainous area, known in Romanian as the Carpații de Curbură, lies in the western part of the county, at the Southern end of the Eastern Carpathians, with heights over 1,400 m (4,600 ft). To the East, the heights decrease into hilly areas and the lower valley of the Siret River.

The main tributary of the Siret, which crosses the county, is the Putna River. A right tributary of the Putna is the Milcov, a river that divides Moldavia from Muntenia.

=== Seismic hazard ===
The territory of Vrancea County is the most seismically active zone of Romania, with yearly earthquakes whose focal depths are between 80 and 160 km (50 and 99 mi) and therefore affect wide regions. This region is sometimes called Europe's "Ring of Fire".

These earthquakes with epicenter in Vrancea are caused by the movements of the nearby fault blocks. Devastating earthquakes measuring 7 to 8 on the Richter scale have been recorded.

The deadliest were the 1977 Vrancea earthquake, which killed over 1,500 people in Romania and Bulgaria, and the 1940 Vrancea earthquake which killed over 1,000 people. The most powerful was the 1802 Vrancea earthquake with an estimated intensity of 7.9 on the moment magnitude scale, but which killed only 4 people. Other notable earthquakes were the 1738 Vrancea earthquake, the 1838 Vrancea earthquake and the 1986 Vrancea earthquake.

=== Neighbours ===
- Vaslui County and Galați County to the East.
- Covasna County to the West.
- Bacău County to the North.
- Buzău County to the South and Brăila County to the South-East.

== Economy ==
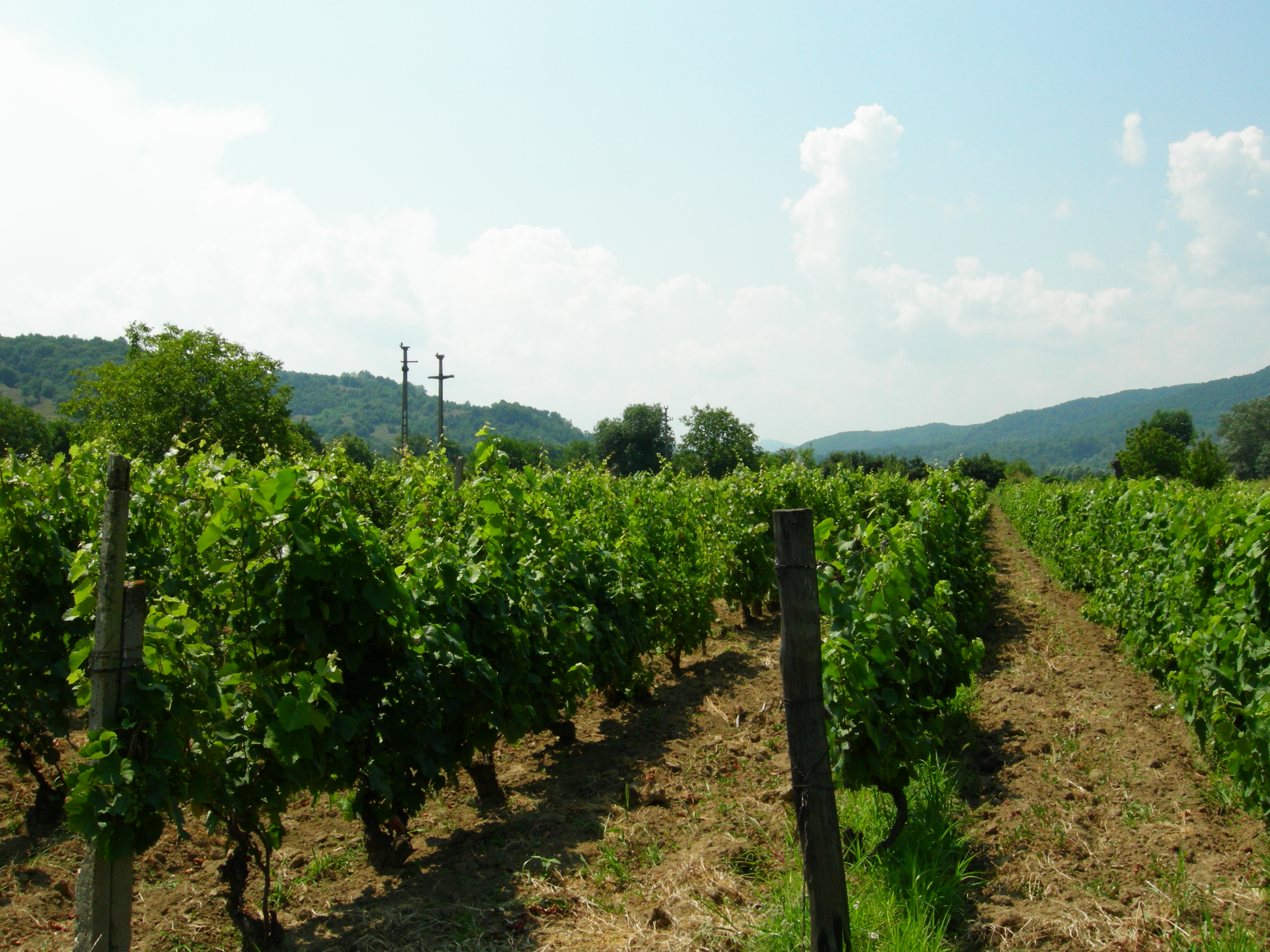
Vineyards near Focșani, the seat of Vrancea County.

The county is famous for its wines, being the biggest wine producer in Romania. Over 11% of the county surface is covered with vines. The county's best known wine regions are Panciu – 8,100 ha (20,000 acres), Odobești – 7,000 ha (17,000 acres), and Cotești.

In addition, the county's main industries are the following:

- Foods and beverages;
- Textiles;
- Paper manufacturing and furniture making;
- Mechanical parts and components;
- Cookware and bakeware production.

== Tourism ==
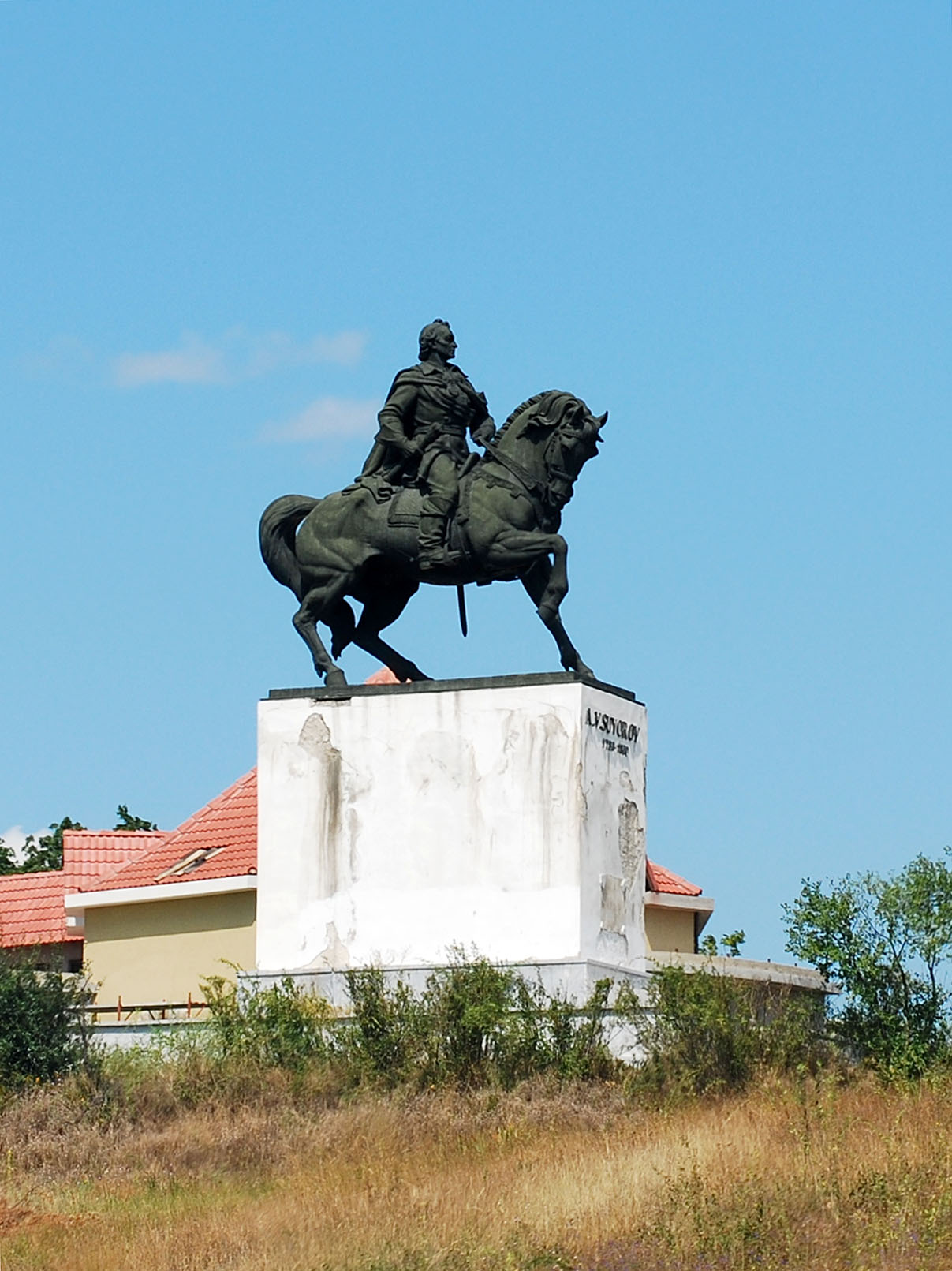
The Suvorov monument near Focșani

County's main destinations:

- The city of Focșani;
- Vrancea Mountains;
- Soveja resort;
- Tulnici – Lepșa – Greșu tourist areas;
- Eternal Fire (Focul viu in Romanian) in Andreiașu;
- Wine tasting and sales around Panciu, Odobești, and Cotești;
- The Mausoleum at Mărășești;
- Putna-Vrancea Natural Park.

== Politics ==
The Vrancea County Council, renewed at the 2024 local elections, consists of 32 councilors, with the following party composition:

Party	Seats	Current County Council
National Liberal Party (PNL)	13	
Social Democratic Party (PSD)	13	
Alliance for the Union of Romanians (AUR)	3	
United Right Alliance (ADU)	3	

== Administrative divisions ==
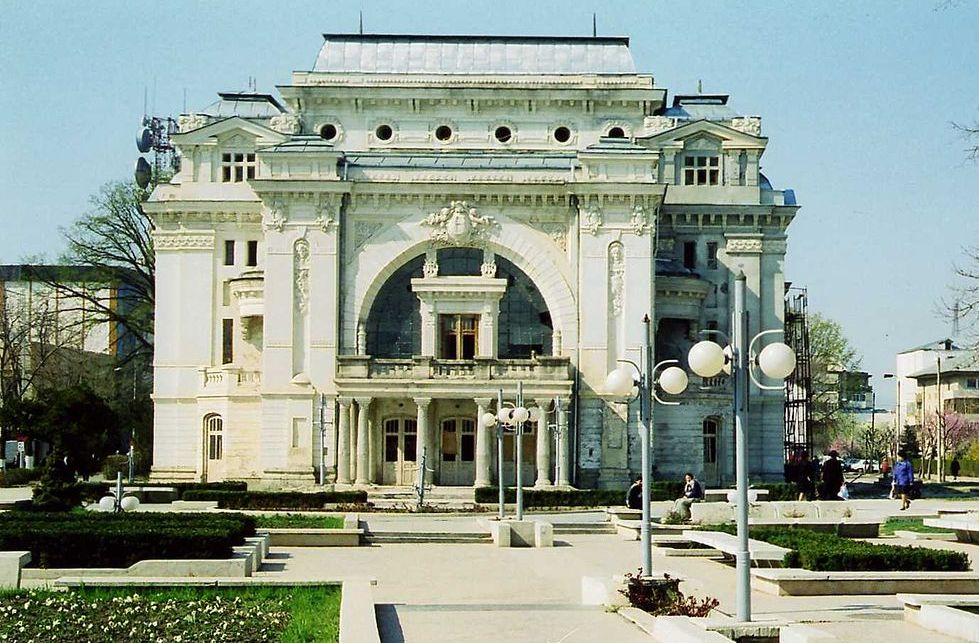
Focșani

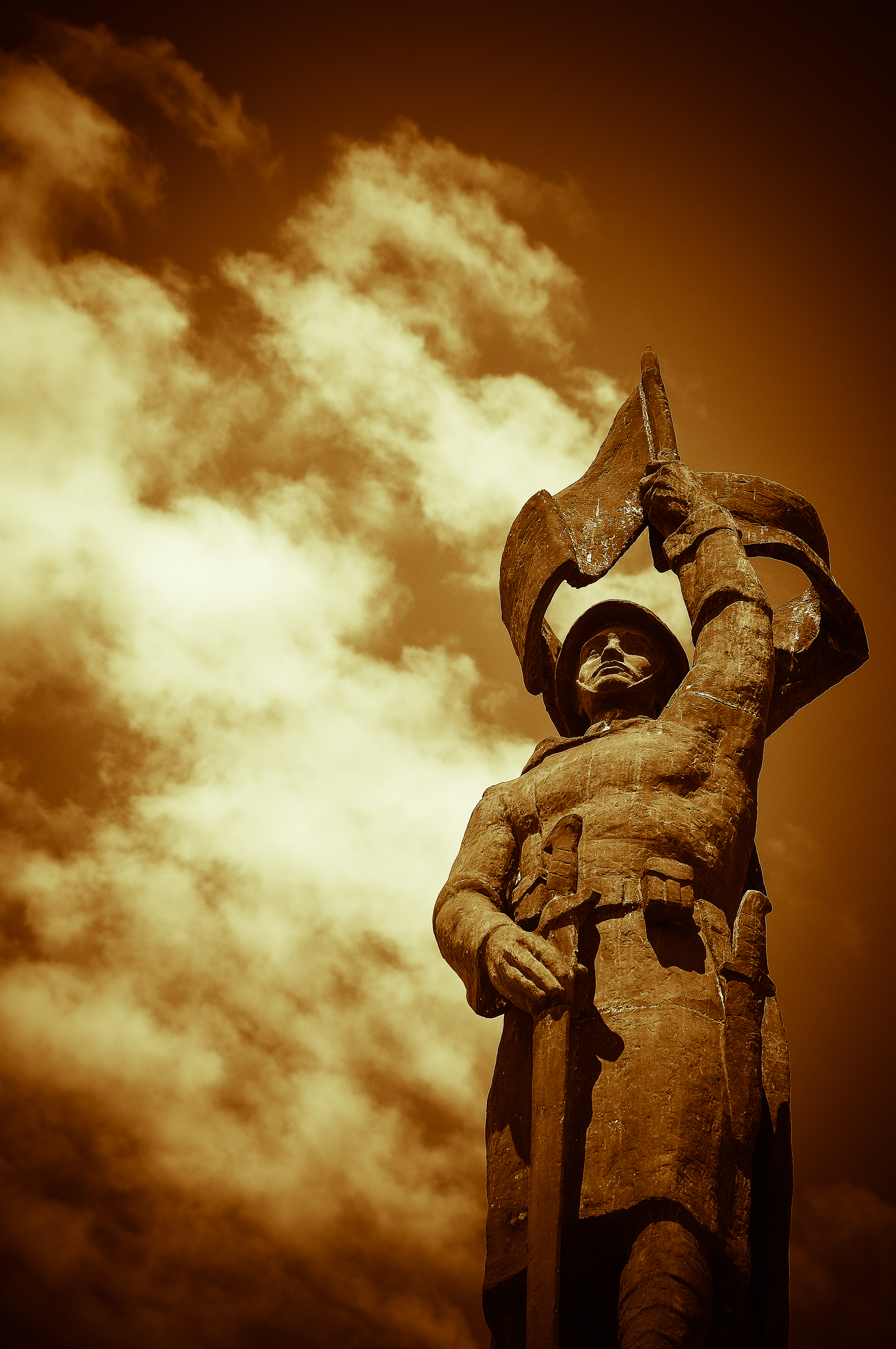
Monument to victims of World War I in Adjud

Vrancea County has 2 municipalities, 3 towns and 68 communes

- Municipalities
  - Adjud
  - Focșani – county seat; population: 66,719 (as of 2021)
- Towns
  - Mărășești
  - Odobești
  - Panciu
- Communes
  - Andreiașu de Jos
  - Bălești
  - Bârsești
  - Biliești
  - Boghești
  - Bolotești
  - Bordești
  - Broșteni
  - Câmpineanca
  - Câmpuri
  - Cârligele
  - Chiojdeni
  - Ciorăști
  - Corbița
  - Cotești
  - Dumbrăveni
  - Dumitrești
  - Fitionești
  - Garoafa
  - Golești
  - Gologanu
  - Gugești
  - Gura Caliței
  - Homocea
  - Jariștea
  - Jitia
  - Măicănești
  - Mera
  - Milcovul
  - Movilița
  - Nănești
  - Năruja
  - Negrilești
  - Nereju
  - Nistorești
  - Obrejița
  - Paltin
  - Păulești
  - Păunești
  - Ploscuțeni
  - Poiana Cristei
  - Popești
  - Pufești
  - Răcoasa
  - Răstoaca
  - Reghiu
  - Ruginești
  - Sihlea
  - Slobozia Bradului
  - Slobozia Ciorăști
  - Soveja
  - Spulber
  - Străoane
  - Suraia
  - Tâmboești
  - Tănăsoaia
  - Tătăranu
  - Tulnici
  - Țifești
  - Urechești
  - Valea Sării
  - Vânători
  - Vârteșcoiu
  - Vidra
  - Vintileasca
  - Vizantea-Livezi
  - Vrâncioaia
  - Vulturu

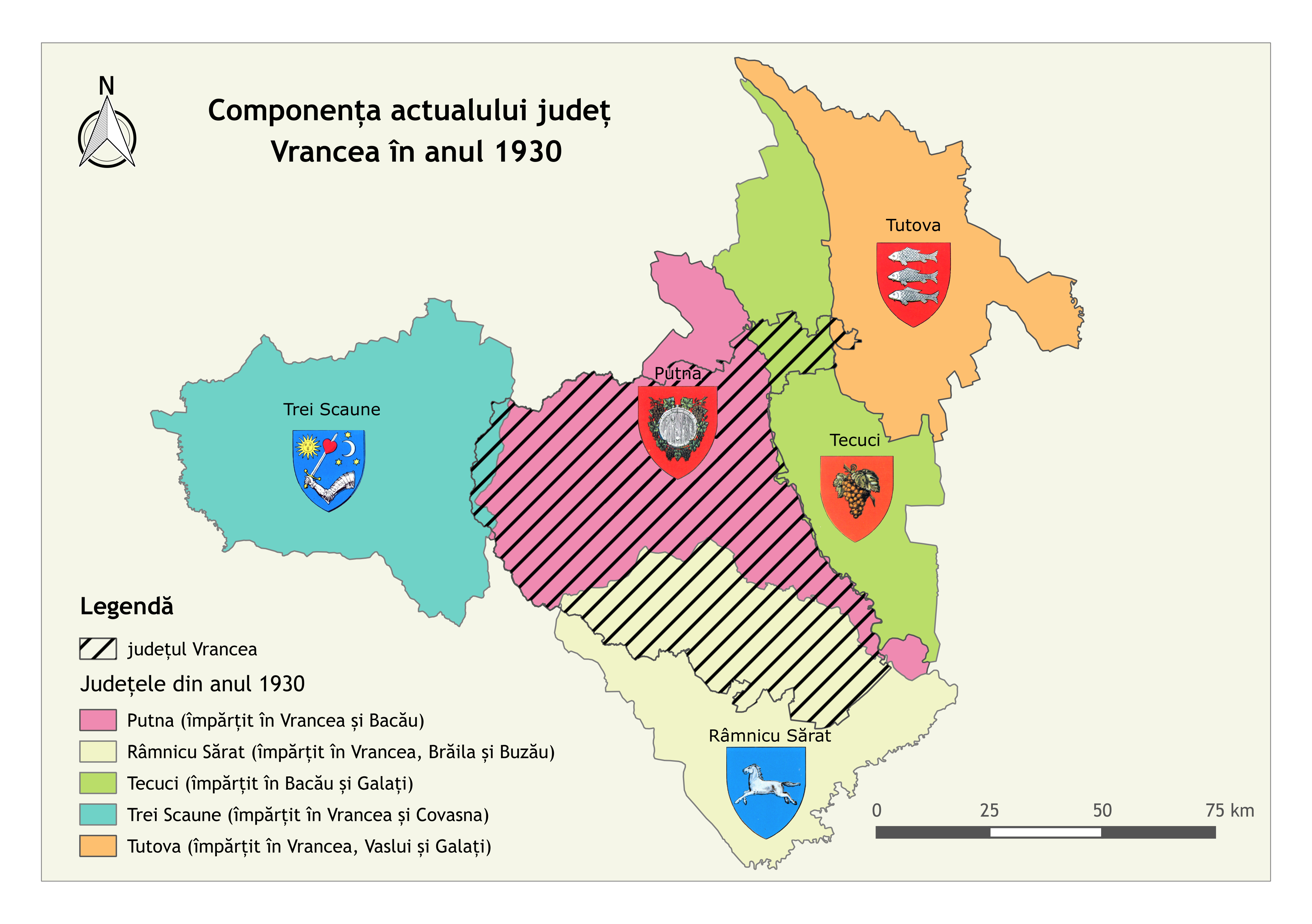
The current day borders of the Vrancea County, superimposed on the Romanian counties of 1930

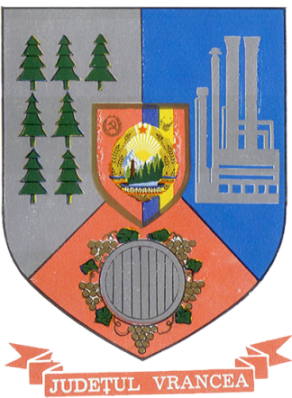
Communist coat of arms of Vrancea County, Socialist Republic of Romania

== See also ==
- Battle of Mărășești
