= Petic =

- Location within Romania

Location
- Country: Romania
- Counties: Vrancea County
- Villages: Țepa

Physical characteristics
- Mouth: Zăbala
  - coordinates: 45.8190°N 26.7781°E
- Length: 12 km (7.5 mi)
- Basin size: 17 km^{2} (6.6 sq mi)

Basin features
- Progression: Zăbala→ Putna→ Siret→ Danube→ Black Sea

The Petic is a left tributary of the river Zăbala in Romania. It flows into the Zăbala near Năruja. Its length is 12 km (7.5 mi) and its basin size is 17 km^{2} (6.6 sq mi).
