= Năruja (river) =

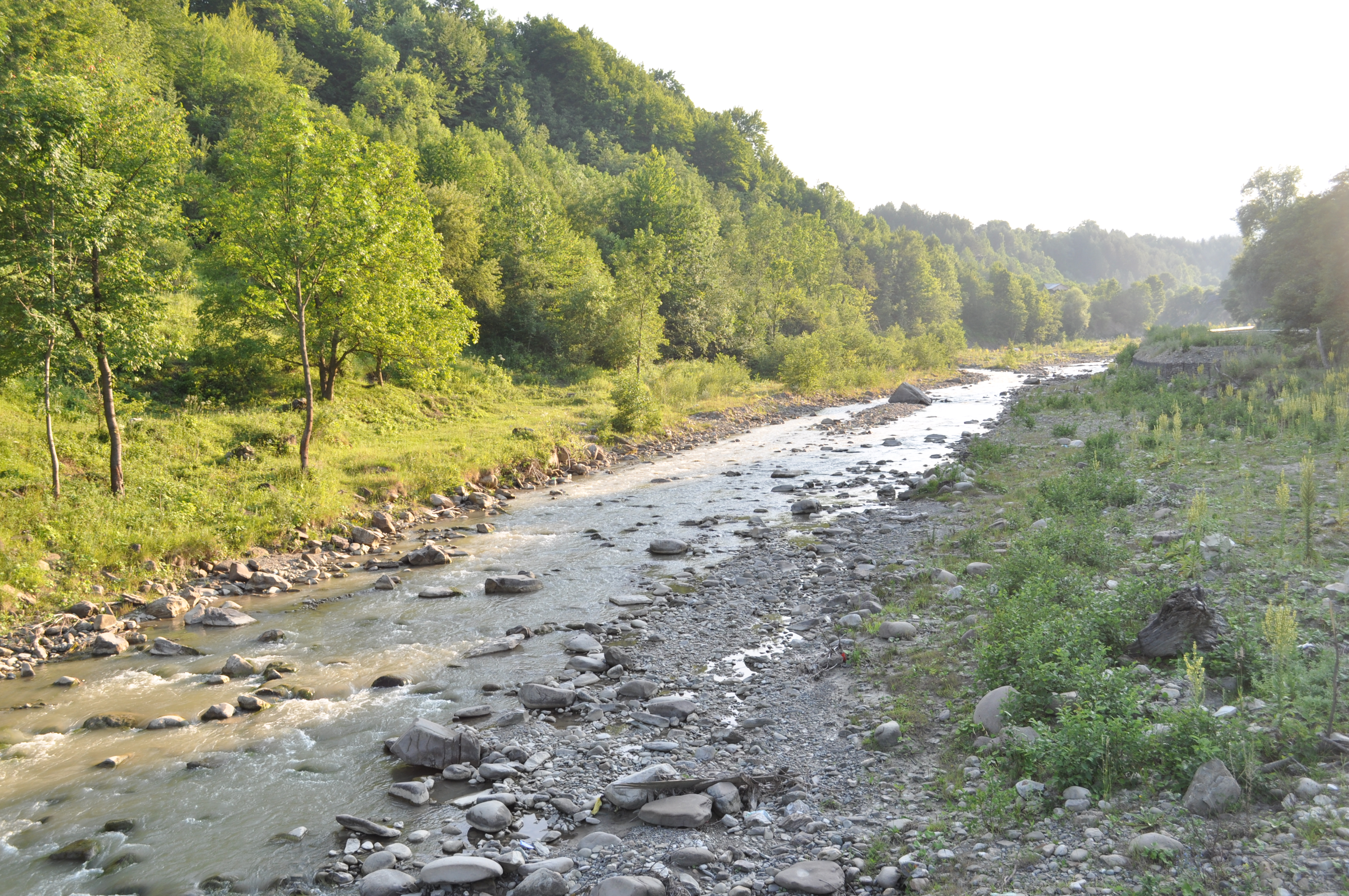

- Location within Romania

Location
- Country: Romania
- Counties: Vrancea County

Physical characteristics
- Source: Vrancea Mountains
- Mouth: Zăbala
  - location: Năruja
  - coordinates: 45.8245°N 26.7832°E
- Length: 31 km (19 mi)
- Basin size: 174 km^{2} (67 sq mi)

Basin features
- Progression: Zăbala→ Putna→ Siret→ Danube→ Black Sea
- Tributaries
  - left: Valea Neagră
  - right: Bălosu, Mișuna, Secătura

The Năruja is a left tributary of the river Zăbala in Romania. It discharges into the Zăbala in the village Năruja. It flows through the villages Brădetu, Valea Neagră, Vetrești-Herăstrău, Nistorești and Năruja. Its length is 31 km (19 mi) and its basin size is 174 km^{2} (67 sq mi).
