= Vidra =

Vidra may refer to the following places:

Romania

- Vidra, Alba, a commune in Alba County
- Vidra, Ilfov, a commune in Ilfov County
- Vidra, Vrancea, a commune in Vrancea County
- Vidra, a village in Vârfurile Commune, Arad County
- Vidra Lake, a reservoir in Vâlcea County
- Vidra, a tributary of the Lotru in Vâlcea County
- Vidra (Putna), a tributary of the Putna in Vrancea County

Other countries

- Vidrà, a municipality in Catalonia, Spain

== See also ==
- Vydra (disambiguation)
- Wydra (disambiguation)
