= Oreavu =

Oreavu may refer to several places in Romania:

- Oreavu, a village in Valea Râmnicului Commune, Buzău County
- Oreavu, a village in Gugești Commune, Vrancea County
- Oreavu (river), a tributary of the Râmna in Vrancea County
