= Țipăul Mare =

- Location within Romania

Location
- Country: Romania
- Counties: Vrancea County
- Villages: Țipău

Physical characteristics
- Mouth: Zăbala
  - coordinates: 45.7600°N 26.7411°E
- Length: 9 km (5.6 mi)
- Basin size: 22 km^{2} (8.5 sq mi)

Basin features
- Progression: Zăbala→ Putna→ Siret→ Danube→ Black Sea

The Țipăul Mare is a left tributary of the river Zăbala in Romania. It flows into the Zăbala near Spulber. Its length is 9 km (5.6 mi) and its basin size is 22 km^{2} (8.5 sq mi).
