= Văsui =

- Location within Romania

Location
- Country: Romania
- Counties: Vrancea County
- Villages: Ploștina, Muncei, Vrâncioaia

Physical characteristics
- Mouth: Putna
  - coordinates: 45.8599°N 26.7676°E
- Length: 12 km (7.5 mi)
- Basin size: 62 km^{2} (24 sq mi)

Basin features
- Progression: Putna→ Siret→ Danube→ Black Sea
- Tributaries
  - left: Hăulișca, Păulești

The Văsui is a right tributary of the river Putna in Romania. It flows into the Putna near Prisaca. Its length is 12 km (7.5 mi) and its basin size is 62 km^{2} (24 sq mi).
