= Paltin-Nistorești mine =

Salt mine in Vrancea County, Romania

- Location: Paltin, Nistorești, Vrancea County, Romania
- Products: Sodium chloride
- Company: Salrom

The Paltin-Nistorești mine is a large salt mine located in eastern Romania in Vrancea County, close to Paltin and Nistorești. Paltin-Nistorești represents one of the largest salt reserves in Romania having estimated reserves of 22 billion tonnes of NaCl.
