= Vizăuți =

- Location within Romania

Location
- Country: Romania
- Counties: Vrancea County
- Villages: Vizantea Mănăstirească

Physical characteristics
- Mouth: Putna
  - coordinates: 45.9166°N 26.9383°E
- Length: 24 km (15 mi)
- Basin size: 86 km^{2} (33 sq mi)

Basin features
- Progression: Putna→ Siret→ Danube→ Black Sea
- Tributaries
  - left: Budulaș, Bejeneci, Turburele, Cârlig
  - right: Găurile

The Vizăuți is a left tributary of the river Putna in Romania. It discharges into the Putna near Vidra. Its length is 24 km (15 mi) and its basin size is 86 km^{2} (33 sq mi).
