= Podu =

Podu (Romanian for "the bridge") starts off the names of several places in Romania. It is also a traditional system of cultivation used by tribes in India, whereby different areas of jungle forest are cleared by burning each year to provide land for crops.

== Places ==
- Podu Broşteni
- Podu Coşnei
- Podu Corbului
- Podu Corbencii
- Podu Cristinii
- Podu Cheii
- Podu Dâmboviţei
- Podu Doamnei
- Podu Grosului
- Podu Hagiului
- Podu Ilfovăţului
- Podu Iloaiei
- Podu Jijiei
- Podu Lacului
- Podu lui Galben
- Podu lui Paul
- Podu Lung
- Podu Muncii
- Podu Nărujei
- Podu Oprii
- Podu Oltului
- Podu Popa Nae
- Podu Pietriş
- Podu Pitarului
- Podu Rizii
- Podu Stoica
- Podu Şchiopului
- Podu Turcului
- Podu Ursului
- Podu Văleni
- Podu Vadului
