= Oreavu (river) =

- Location within Romania

Location
- Country: Romania
- Counties: Vrancea County
- Villages: Odobasca, Urechești

Physical characteristics
- Mouth: Râmna
  - coordinates: 45.5828°N 27.1554°E
- Length: 18 km (11 mi)
- Basin size: 40 km^{2} (15 sq mi)

Basin features
- Progression: Râmna→ Putna→ Siret→ Danube→ Black Sea

The Oreavu is a left tributary of the river Râmna in Romania. It flows into the Râmna in the village Oreavu. Its length is 18 km (11 mi) and its basin size is 40 km^{2} (15 sq mi).
