= Podul =

Podul may refer to:

- Podul Grant, bridge for motorway and lightrail in Bucharest, Romania
- Podul Lung, a village in Sipoteni village, Călăraşi district, Moldova
- Podul Popii, tributary of the river Bașeu in Romania
- Podu (disambiguation), several places in Romania
- Typhoon Podul (disambiguation), used to name five tropical cyclones in the northwestern Pacific Ocean
