= Colacu =

Colacu may refer to several villages in Romania:

- Colacu, a village in the town of Răcari, Dâmboviţa County
- Colacu, a village in Fundu Moldovei Commune, Suceava County
- Colacu, a village in Valea Sării Commune, Vrancea County
