= Vidra (Putna) =

- Location within Romania

Location
- Country: Romania
- Counties: Vrancea County
- Villages: Mesteacănu

Physical characteristics
- Mouth: Putna
  - coordinates: 45.9044°N 26.9009°E
- Length: 11 km (6.8 mi)
- Basin size: 11 km^{2} (4.2 sq mi)

Basin features
- Progression: Putna→ Siret→ Danube→ Black Sea

The Vidra is a left tributary of the river Putna in Romania. It flows into the Putna in the village Vidra. Its length is 11 km (6.8 mi) and its basin size is 11 km^{2} (4.2 sq mi).
