= Deju =

- Location within Romania

Location
- Country: Romania
- Counties: Vrancea County
- Villages: Negrilești

Physical characteristics
- Mouth: Putna
  - location: Negrilești
  - coordinates: 45.9209°N 26.7024°E
- Length: 11 km (6.8 mi)
- Basin size: 34 km^{2} (13 sq mi)

Basin features
- Progression: Putna→ Siret→ Danube→ Black Sea
- Tributaries
  - left: Tighitău

The Deju is a left tributary of the river Putna in Romania. It flows into the Putna near Negrilești. Its length is 11 km (6.8 mi) and its basin size is 34 km^{2} (13 sq mi).
