= Pârâul Mărului =

- Location within Romania

Location
- Country: Romania
- Counties: Vrancea County

Physical characteristics
- Mouth: Putna
  - coordinates: 45.9407°N 26.4689°E
- Length: 7 km (4.3 mi)
- Basin size: 27 km^{2} (10 sq mi)

Basin features
- Progression: Putna→ Siret→ Danube→ Black Sea

The Pârâul Mărului is a left tributary of the river Putna in Romania. It flows into the Putna near Greșu. Its length is 7 km (4.3 mi) and its basin size is 27 km^{2} (10 sq mi).
