= Rașcuța =

- Location within Romania

Location
- Country: Romania
- Counties: Vrancea County

Physical characteristics
- Mouth: Râmna
  - coordinates: 45.6162°N 26.9609°E
- Length: 14 km (8.7 mi)
- Basin size: 68 km^{2} (26 sq mi)

Basin features
- Progression: Râmna→ Putna→ Siret→ Danube→ Black Sea

The Rașcuța is a right tributary of the river Râmna in the country of Romania. It flows into the Râmna near Cocoșari. Its length is 14 km (8.7 mi) and its basin size is 68 km^{2} (26 sq mi).
