= Zăbala (Putna) =

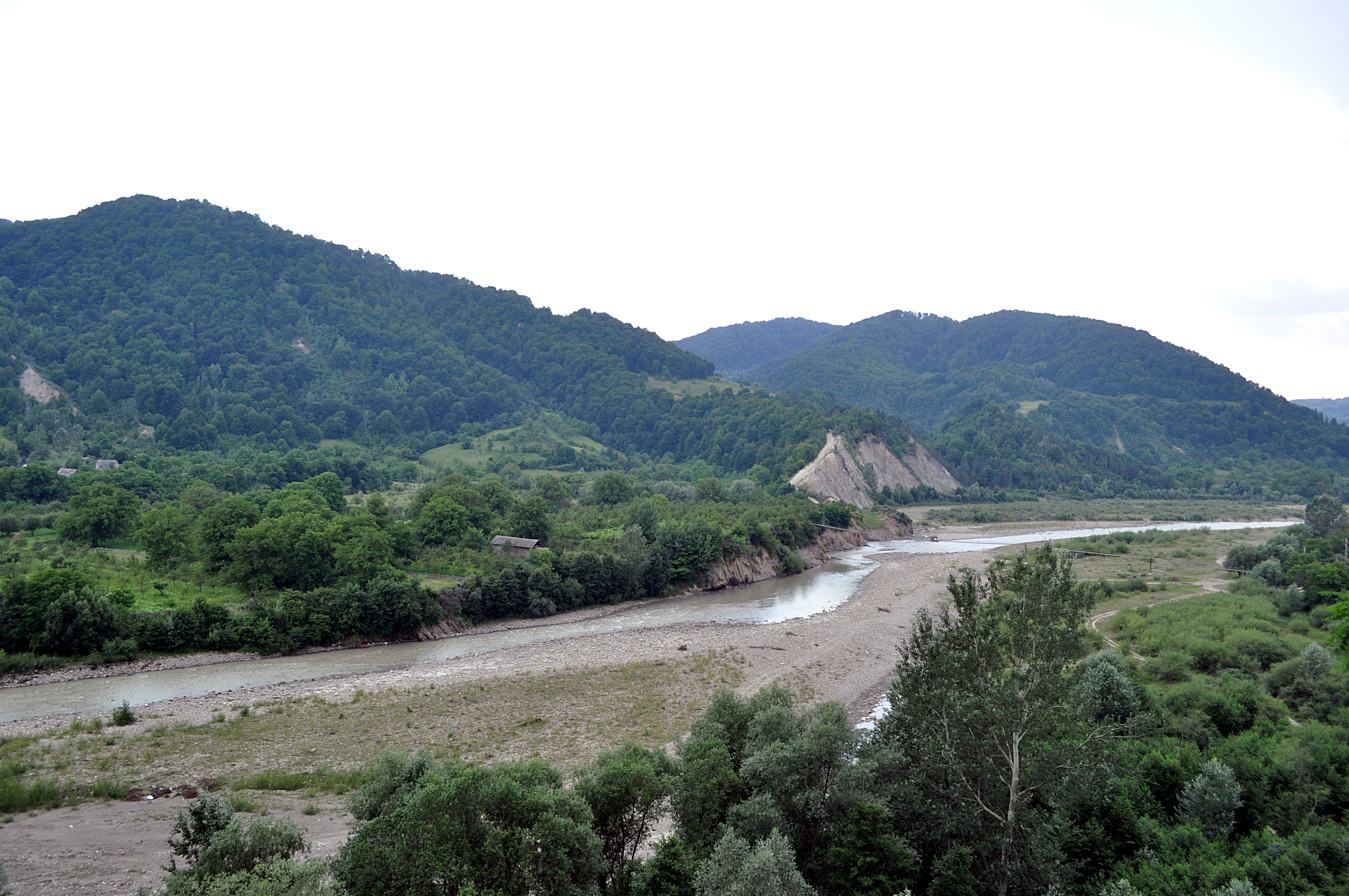
- The Zăbala near Năruja

- Location within Romania

Location
- Country: Romania
- Counties: Vrancea County
- Villages: Nereju, Spulber, Paltin, Năruja

Physical characteristics
- Source: Vrancea Mountains
- Mouth: Putna
  - location: Prisaca
  - coordinates: 45.8576°N 26.7724°E
- Length: 68 km (42 mi)
- Basin size: 544 km^{2} (210 sq mi)

Basin features
- Progression: Putna→ Siret→ Danube→ Black Sea

The Zăbala, also known in its uppermost course as Zăbăluța, is a right tributary of the river Putna in Romania. Its source is in the Vrancea Mountains, close to the sources of the Putna, the Bâsca Mare and the Ghelința. It flows through the communes Nereju, Spulber, Paltin, Năruja. It discharges into the Putna near Valea Sării. Its length is 68 km (42 mi) and its basin size is 544 km^{2} (210 sq mi).

== Tributaries ==
The following rivers are tributaries to the river Zăbala:

- Left: Arișoaia, Măcrișu, Palcău, Țipăul Mare, Petic, Năruja
- Right: Mârdanu, Goru, Căbălașu, Giurgiu, Zârna Mare, Zârna Mică
