= Coza =

Tributary of the river in Romania

- Location within Romania

Location
- Country: Romania
- Counties: Vrancea County

Physical characteristics
- Mouth: Putna
  - coordinates: 45.9076°N 26.6652°E
- Length: 14 km (8.7 mi)
- Basin size: 48 km^{2} (19 sq mi)

Basin features
- Progression: Putna→ Siret→ Danube→ Black Sea
- Tributaries
  - left: Dumbrăvanu
  - right: Alun

The Coza is a right tributary of the river Putna in Romania. It flows into the Putna in the village Coza. Its length is 14 km (8.7 mi) and its basin size is 48 km^{2} (19 sq mi).
