= Șoimul (Putna) =

- Location within Romania

Location
- Country: Romania
- Counties: Vrancea County
- Villages: Vânători

Physical characteristics
- Mouth: Putna
  - coordinates: 45.7433°N 27.2659°E
- Length: 16 km (9.9 mi)
- Basin size: 50 km^{2} (19 sq mi)

Basin features
- Progression: Putna→ Siret→ Danube→ Black Sea

The Șoimul is a right tributary of the river Putna in Romania. It flows into the Putna near Mirceștii Noi. Its length is 16 km (9.9 mi) and its basin size is 50 km^{2} (19 sq mi). Though the river channel was straightened and resectioned and flood control dykes were built, the village of Vânători is frequently flooded by the river, at least four times in the years 2005-2006
