= Poduri (disambiguation) =

Poduri may refer to several places in Romania:

- Poduri, a commune in Bacău County
- Poduri, a village in Câmpeni town, Alba County
- Poduri, a village in Corbi Commune, Argeș County
- Poduri, a village in Valea Largă Commune, Mureș County
- Poduri, a village in Valea Sării Commune, Vrancea County
