= Gălăciuc =

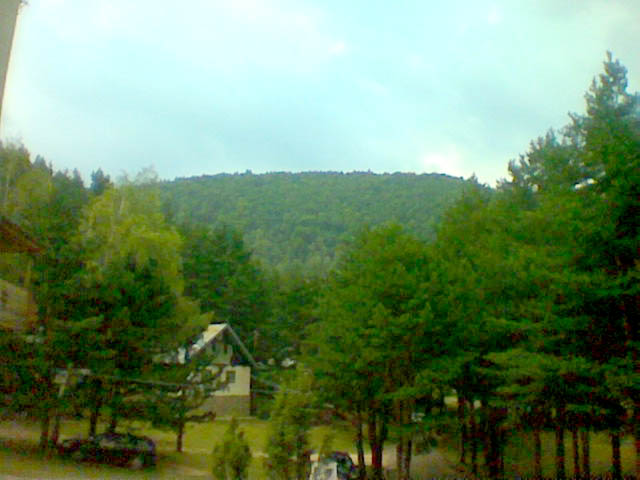
Galaciuc camp in 2004

Gălăciuc (pronounced Gah-lah-chook) is a youth camp in Vrancea county, Romania, 3 km west from Tulnici village, 10 km east of Lepşa resort and 75 km west of Focşani at an altitude of 710 meters, near National Road 2D, in some of the most beautiful and picturesque surroundings in the Carpathians. Built in the 1970s in a very remote, mountainous region, it is the host of some national or international contests such as the Infoeducatie Applied Informatics Contests or The Omega Balkanic Physics contest. The camp can accommodate 390 persons, but the very poor conditions available on site have restricted its official maximum accommodation number to 250.

== Conditions and Accommodation ==
Housing is either in the Main Building, in rooms with 4 beds and the Galaciuc building, rooms with 2 or 3 beds, or wooden buildings with 6 or 8 beds. Most of the buildings existed prior to the opening of the camp, being log-cabins belonging to Vrancea's Forest Management Company.

== Activities ==
Gălăciuc is an excellent venue for paragliding, mountaineering and sightseeing. Its very good position and clean air are the advantages of the camp. 8 km from the camp, in the direction of Lepşa lies the Putna waterfall, with a number of trekking routes, while 10 km away, near Lepşa, there is the Cheile Tişiţei nature preserve and wildlife reservation (with one of the largest population of wild bears in Europe. Trout fishing is possible either in the Putna river or the Lepşa trout farm.

== InfoEducatie ==
Infoeducatie is the most important event in Gălăciuc. Taking place in July or August it is a national software development contest for high-school students in Romania. First taking place in 1994, it is also the oldest one surviving. Students are required to bring a home-made software (any kind is accepted, although educational software falls in a special category) developed by themselves or a website and show it in front of a jury. To be able to enter the contest, you must win a prize (rank 1st, 2nd or 3rd) in local and regional qualification rounds. Sponsors include Google, Orange and Cisco. Although prizes are not high ($350 for first prize in 2004), all students that win a prize are entitled to enroll in some informatics departments of Romanian universities without standard application procedures (they are automatically accepted), thus making the competition rather fierce. Some of the software presented is of commercial grade, including CAD programs and utilities, games, anti-viral software, robots programming and compression tools. A great number of people, IT&C specialists, grow here in this wonderful place Details on the official site of the contest: www.infoeducatie.ro
