= Mătăcina =

Mătăcina may refer to several villages in Romania:

- Mătăcina, in Vințu de Jos Commune, Alba County
- Mătăcina, in Valea Sării Commune, Vrancea County
