= Tișița =

- Location within Romania

Location
- Country: Romania
- Counties: Vrancea County

Physical characteristics
- Mouth: Putna
  - location: Downstream of Lepșa
  - coordinates: 45.9412°N 26.5865°E
- Length: 18 km (11 mi)
- Basin size: 56 km^{2} (22 sq mi)

Basin features
- Progression: Putna→ Siret→ Danube→ Black Sea
- Tributaries
  - left: Tișița Mică
  - right: Haliciu Mare, Haliciu Mic, Cristianul Mic

The Tișița (in its upper course also: Tișița Mare) is a right tributary of the river Putna in Romania. It discharges into the Putna downstream from Lepșa. Its length is 18 km (11 mi) and its basin size is 56 km^{2} (22 sq mi).
