= Vydra =

Vydra may refer to:

- Vydra (river) in the Czech Republic
- Vydra, Ukraine, a village (selo) in Brodivskyi Raion, Lviv Oblast, Ukraine
- 21290 Vydra, a main belt asteroid
- Vydra (surname)

== See also ==
- Wydra (disambiguation)
- Vidra (disambiguation)
