= Ramna (disambiguation) =

Ramna or Râmna may refer to:

- Ramna Thana, a neighborhood in Dhaka, Bangladesh
  - Ramna Park, a public park in the neighborhood
  - Ramna Kali Mandir, an extinct Hindu temple in the park
- Ramna Sharma, an entrepreneur from India
- rivers in Romania:
  - Râmna, a tributary of the Lotru in Vâlcea County
  - Râmna (Putna), a tributary of the Putna in Vrancea County
