= Zârna =

Zârna may refer to the following rivers in Romania:

- Zârna (Râul Doamnei), in Argeș County
- Zârna, a tributary of the Drăgan in Cluj County
- Zârna Mare, a tributary of the Zăbala in Vrancea County
- Zârna Mică, a tributary of the Zăbala in Vrancea County
