= Sturza =

- Location within Romania

Location
- Country: Romania
- Counties: Vrancea County

Physical characteristics
- Mouth: Putna
  - coordinates: 45.6810°N 27.2798°E
- Length: 34 km (21 mi)
- Basin size: 117 km^{2} (45 sq mi)

Basin features
- Progression: Putna→ Siret→ Danube→ Black Sea

The Sturza is a right tributary of the river Putna in Romania. It passes through the city of Focșani and flows into the Putna near Răstoaca. Its length is 34 km (21 mi) and its basin size is 117 km^{2} (45 sq mi).
