= Râmna (Putna) =

- Location within Romania

Location
- Country: Romania
- Counties: Vrancea County
- Villages: Gura Caliței, Gugești, Slobozia Ciorăști

Physical characteristics
- Mouth: Putna
  - coordinates: 45.6533°N 27.3227°E
- Length: 66 km (41 mi)
- Basin size: 415 km^{2} (160 sq mi)

Basin features
- Progression: Putna→ Siret→ Danube→ Black Sea
- Tributaries
  - left: Oreavu, Argintul
  - right: Valea Neagră, Rașcuța

The Râmna is a right tributary of the river Putna in Romania. It discharges into the Putna near Răstoaca. Its length is 66 km (41 mi) and its basin size is 415 km^{2} (160 sq mi).
