= Bârsești =

- Commune
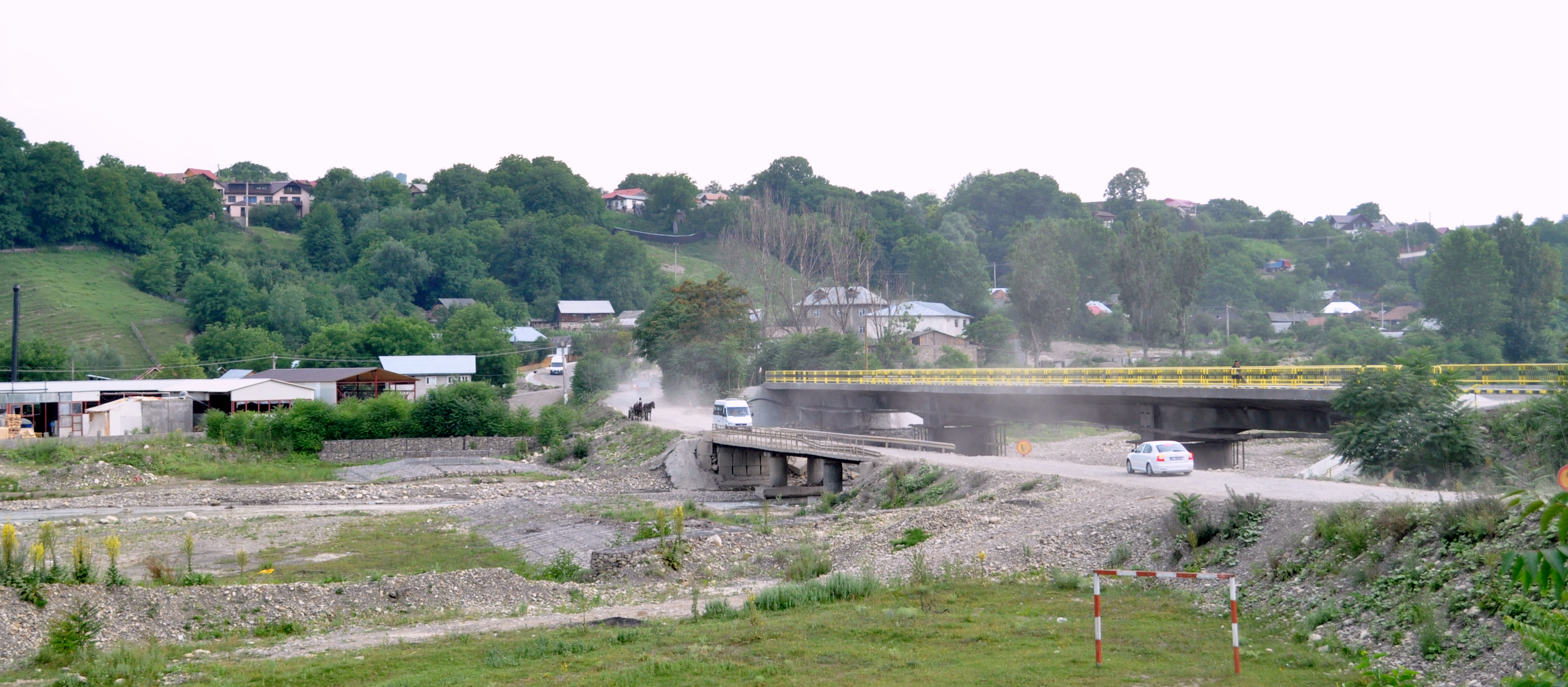
- View of Bârsești

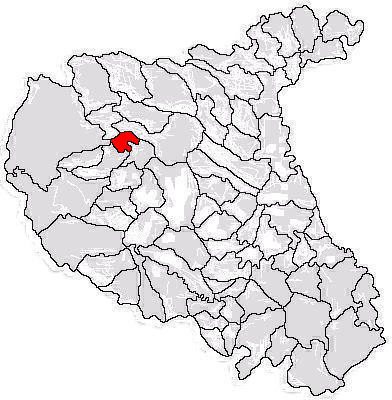
- Location in Vrancea County

- Location in Romania
- Coordinates: 45°55′N 26°44′E
- Country: Romania
- County: Vrancea

Government
  - Mayor (2024–2028): Ștefan Caba (PNL)
- Area: 14.55 km^{2} (5.62 sq mi)
- Elevation: 424 m (1,391 ft)
- Population (2021-12-01): 1,132
  - Density: 77.80/km^{2} (201.5/sq mi)
- Time zone: UTC+02:00 (EET)
  - Summer (DST): UTC+03:00 (EEST)
- Postal code: 627020
- Area code: +(40) 237
- Vehicle reg.: VN
- Website: www.birsesti.primarievn.ro

Bârsești is a commune located in Vrancea County, Western Moldavia, Romania. It is composed of two villages, Bârsești and Topești, and also included Negrilești before it split off as a separate commune in 2003.

The commune is located in the hilly area of the county, on the middle course of the river Putna. It is crossed by the national road DN2D that connects Focșani and Târgu Secuiesc. It is located at a distance of 52 km (32 mi) from Focșani, the county seat.

Historical population
Year	Pop.	±%
2002	1,574	—
2011	1,299	−17.5%
2021	1,132	−12.9%
Source: Census data
