= Perieni =

- Commune
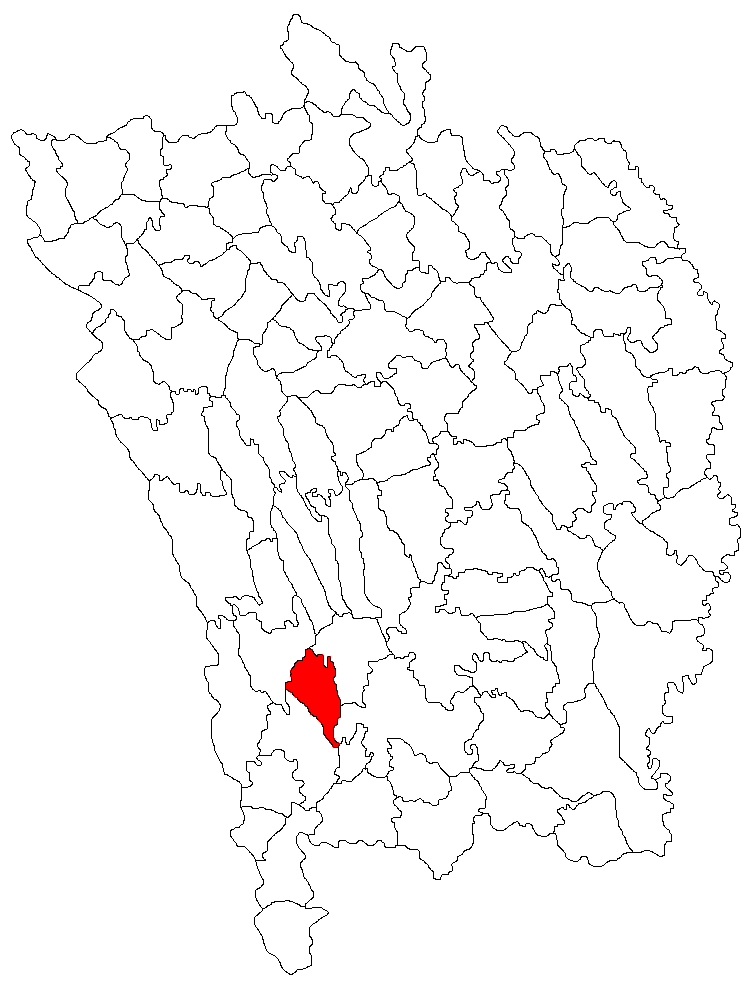
- Location in Vaslui County

- Location in Romania
- Coordinates: 46°18′N 27°37′E
- Country: Romania
- County: Vaslui

Government
  - Mayor (2020–2024): Alexandru Iacob (ALDE)
- Area: 40 km^{2} (20 sq mi)
- Population (2021-12-01): 3,580
  - Density: 90/km^{2} (230/sq mi)
- Time zone: EET/EEST (UTC+2/+3)
- Vehicle reg.: VS

Perieni is a commune in Vaslui County, Western Moldavia, Romania. It is composed of a single village, Perieni. It included four other villages until 2004, when these were split off to form Ciocani Commune.
