= Valeriu Cotea =

- Born: May 11, 1926; Vidra, Vrancea County, Kingdom of Romania
- Died: April 21, 2016 (aged 89); Iași, Romania
- Occupation: Oenologist
- Children: Valeriu V. Cotea

Valeriu D. Cotea (May 11, 1926–April 21, 2016) was a Romanian oenologist. From 1976 to 2000, Cotea represented Romania at the International Organisation of Vine and Wine, based in Paris. He founded and led the Iași-based Oenology Research Centre of the Romanian Academy, based in Iași. He was elected a titular member of the academy in 1993. Cotea died in Iași in 2016 following cardiac arrest provoked by choking on a slice of orange. He was 89.
