= Spulber =

- Commune
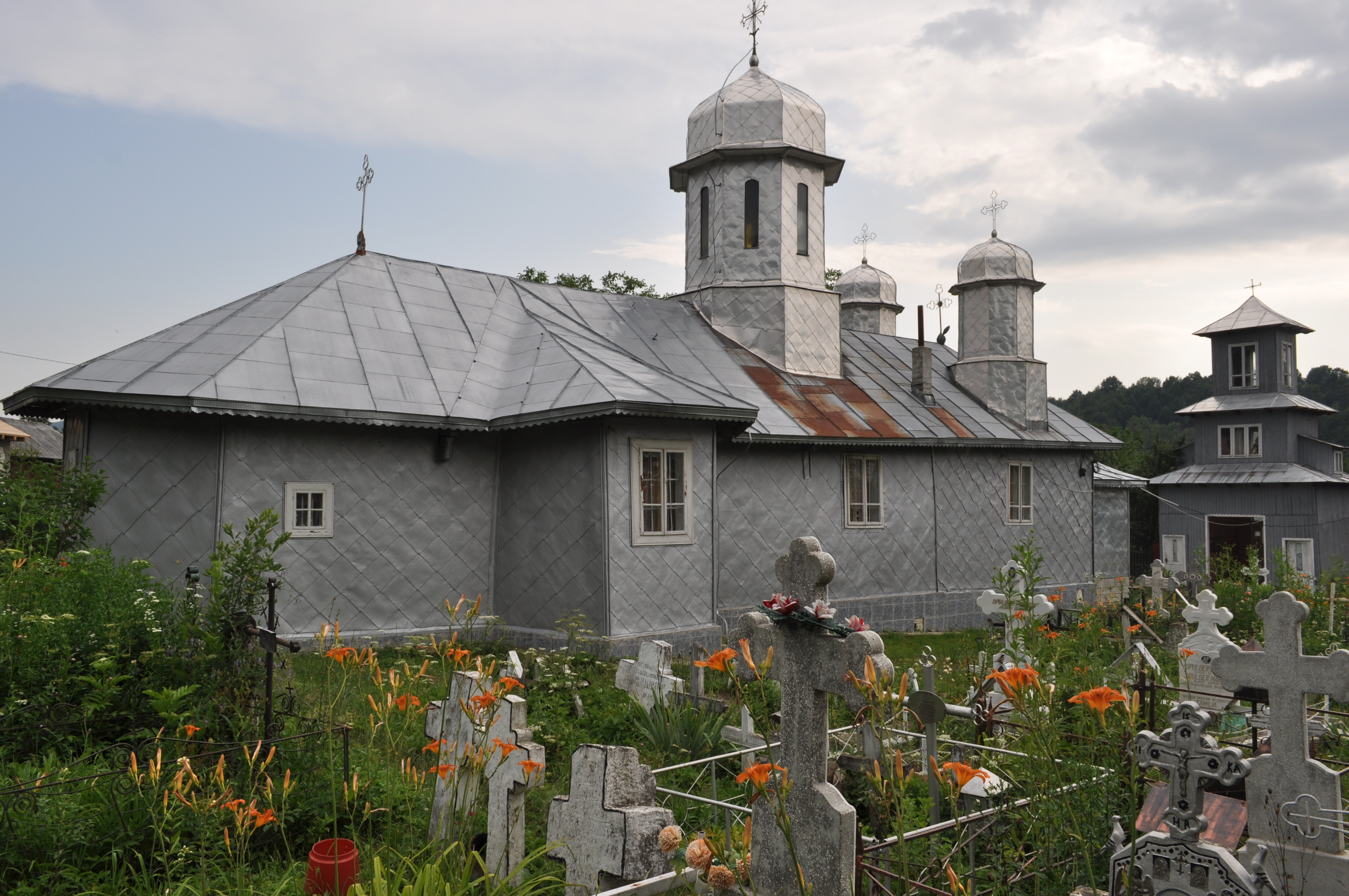
- Wooden church in Spulber Vale

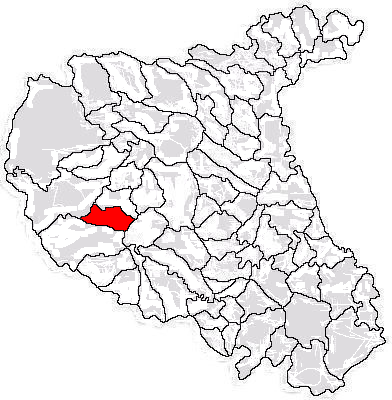
- Location in Vrancea County

- Location in Romania
- Coordinates: 45°45′N 26°45′E
- Country: Romania
- County: Vrancea

Government
  - Mayor (2024–2028): Sorinel-Gicu Vulcan (PNL)
- Area: 21.78 km^{2} (8.41 sq mi)
- Elevation: 330 m (1,080 ft)
- Population (2021-12-01): 1,241
  - Density: 56.98/km^{2} (147.6/sq mi)
- Time zone: UTC+02:00 (EET)
  - Summer (DST): UTC+03:00 (EEST)
- Postal code: 627247
- Area code: +(40) 237
- Vehicle reg.: VN
- Website: www.spulber.primarievn.ro

Spulber is a commune located in Vrancea County, Romania. It is composed of seven villages: Carșochești-Corăbița, Morărești, Păvălari, Spulber, Tojanii de Jos, Tojanii de Sus, and Țipău. These were part of Paltin Commune until 2005, when they were split off.

== Geographical positioning ==
The commune is situated along the river Zăbala, with some villages being spread on the surrounding hills and valleys. The Tojan mountain is situated on the eastern bank of the river, as well as the old local church. Spulber is situated on county road DJ205D and has Nereju to the south and Paltin to the north.

== Economy ==
The chief economic activity is agriculture, with fruit orchards, meadows, and animal breeding as the main activities.

Historical population
Year	Pop.	±%
2002	1,416	—
2011	1,279	−9.7%
2021	1,241	−3.0%
Source: Census data
