= Wydra =

Wydra may refer to:

- Wydra, Silesian Voivodeship, a village in southern Poland
- Wydra (surname), a Polish surname

== See also ==
- Vydra (disambiguation)
