= Lepșa =

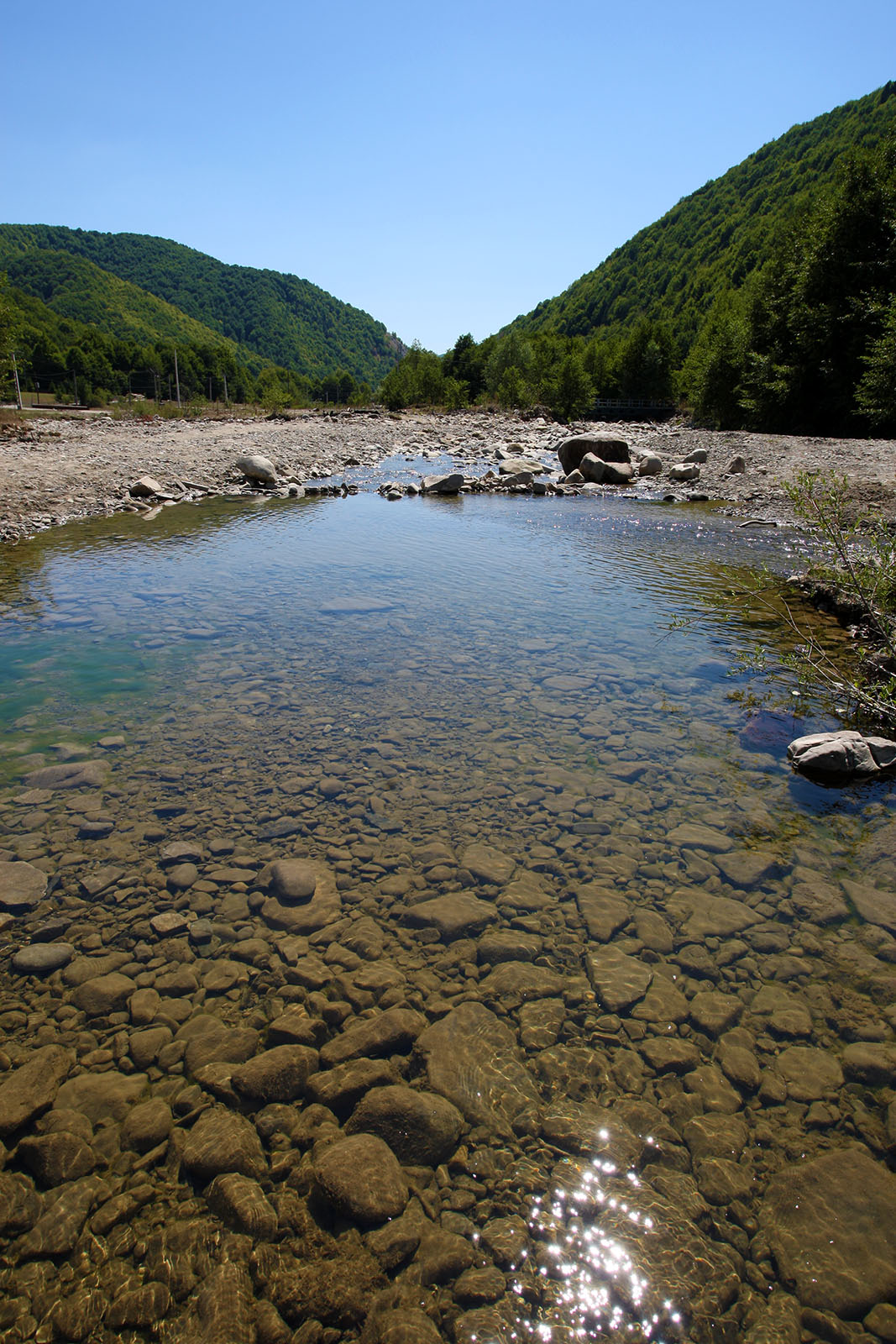

- Location within Romania

Location
- Country: Romania
- Counties: Vrancea County

Physical characteristics
- Source: Mount Tâmla
  - location: Vrancea Mountains
  - coordinates: 46°02′11″N 26°26′32″E
  - elevation: 1,217 m (3,993 ft)
- Mouth: Putna
  - location: Lepșa
  - coordinates: 45°56′54″N 26°34′24″E
  - elevation: 576 m (1,890 ft)
- Length: 17 km (11 mi)
- Basin size: 71 km^{2} (27 sq mi)

Basin features
- Progression: Putna→ Siret→ Danube→ Black Sea
- Tributaries
  - left: Sagău, Lepșuleț
  - right: Corimbat, Strâmba

The Lepșa is a left tributary of the river Putna in Romania. It discharges into the Putna in the village Lepșa. Its length is 17 km (11 mi) and its basin size is 71 km^{2} (27 sq mi).
