= Nereju =

- Commune
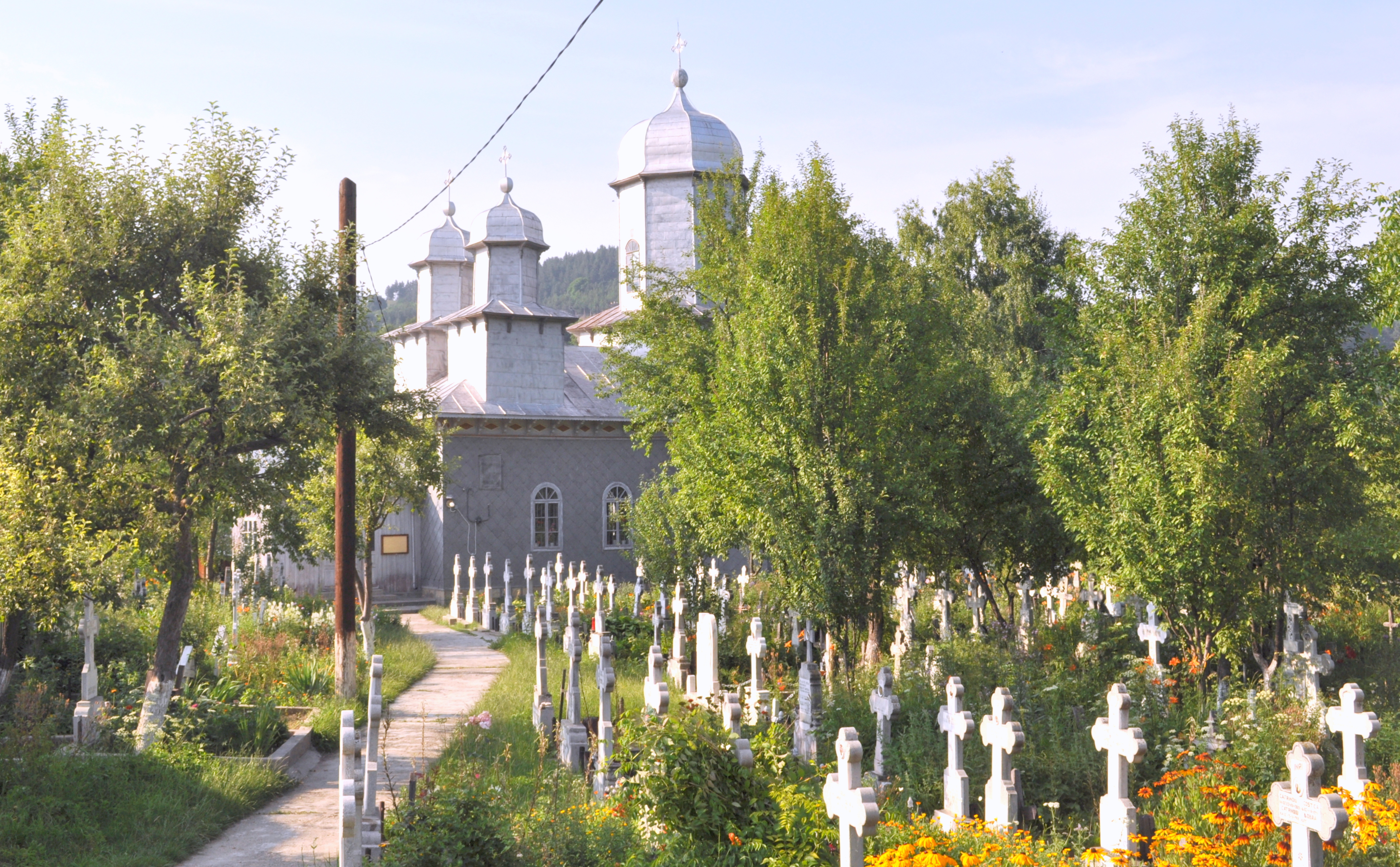
- Orthodox church in Nereju

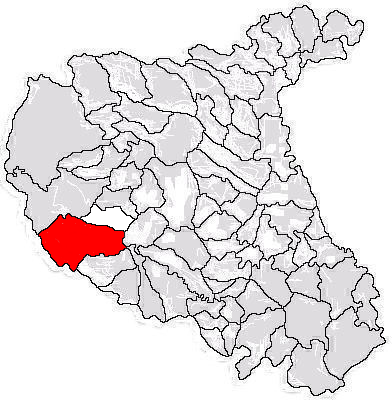
- Location in Vrancea County

- Location in Romania
- Coordinates: 45°43′N 26°43′E
- Country: Romania
- County: Vrancea

Government
  - Mayor (2024–2028): Radu Teodor Beteringhe (PSD)
- Area: 183.8 km^{2} (71.0 sq mi)
- Elevation: 589 m (1,932 ft)
- Population (2021-12-01): 4,240
  - Density: 23.1/km^{2} (59.7/sq mi)
- Time zone: UTC+02:00 (EET)
  - Summer (DST): UTC+03:00 (EEST)
- Postal code: 627225
- Area code: +(40) 237
- Vehicle reg.: VN
- Website: www.primarianereju.ro

Nereju is a commune located in Vrancea County, Romania. It is composed of five villages: Brădăcești, Chiricani (or Chiricari), Nereju, Nereju Mic, and Sahastru.

Nereju, Nereju Mic, and Brădăcești lie along the Zăbala River, while Chiricani and Sahastru are situated on the surrounding hills and valleys.

== History ==
=== 2020 Earthquake ===
On January 31, 2020, a magnitude 4.8 earthquake struck 5 kilometers WNW of the town. The official time of the earthquake was 01:26:47 (UTC).

== Economy ==
Main economic activities are in the wood industry (the surrounding hills are rich in coniferous forests), mountainous ecological agriculture, mountainous tourism, folk arts and traditions.

== Tourism ==
Main touristic sights are:

- Lacul Negru – a natural lake, with an area of 1 ha (2.5 acres), depth 10 m (33 ft), and situated at an altitude of 1,350 m (4,430 ft)
- Mountainous areas Dealul Negru (Black Hill) and Lapoș, at an altitude of 1,400 m (4,600 ft)
- Căldările Zăbalei (Zăbala's Buckets) – a protected area, along the Zăbala River's course

Chipărușul is a local artistic group which features pre-Christian rituals involving masks and other folkloric elements.

The DJ205D road was improved in 2016; the county seat Focșani is some 75 km (47 mi) distant along this route.

Historical population
Year	Pop.	±%
2002	4,228	—
2011	4,187	−1.0%
2021	4,240	+1.3%
Source: Census data

== Natives ==
- Ion Macovei (1885–1950), engineer
