= Vydra (surname) =

Vydra (feminine: Vydrová) is a Czech surname meaning 'otter'. Notable people with the surname include:

- Loukas Vyntra (born 1981), born Lukáš Vydra, Czech-born Greek footballer
- Lukáš Vydra (born 1973), Czech middle-distance runner
- Marek Vydra (born 1975), Czech curler
- Matěj Vydra (born 1992), Czech footballer
- Otakar Vydra (1901–1982), Czech athlete
- Patrik Vydra (born 2003), Czech footballer
- Stanislav Vydra (1741–1804), Czech mathematician
- Václav Vydra (actor, born 1876) (1876–1953), Czech actor
- Václav Vydra (actor born 1956), Czech actor
