= Vrâncioaia =

- Commune
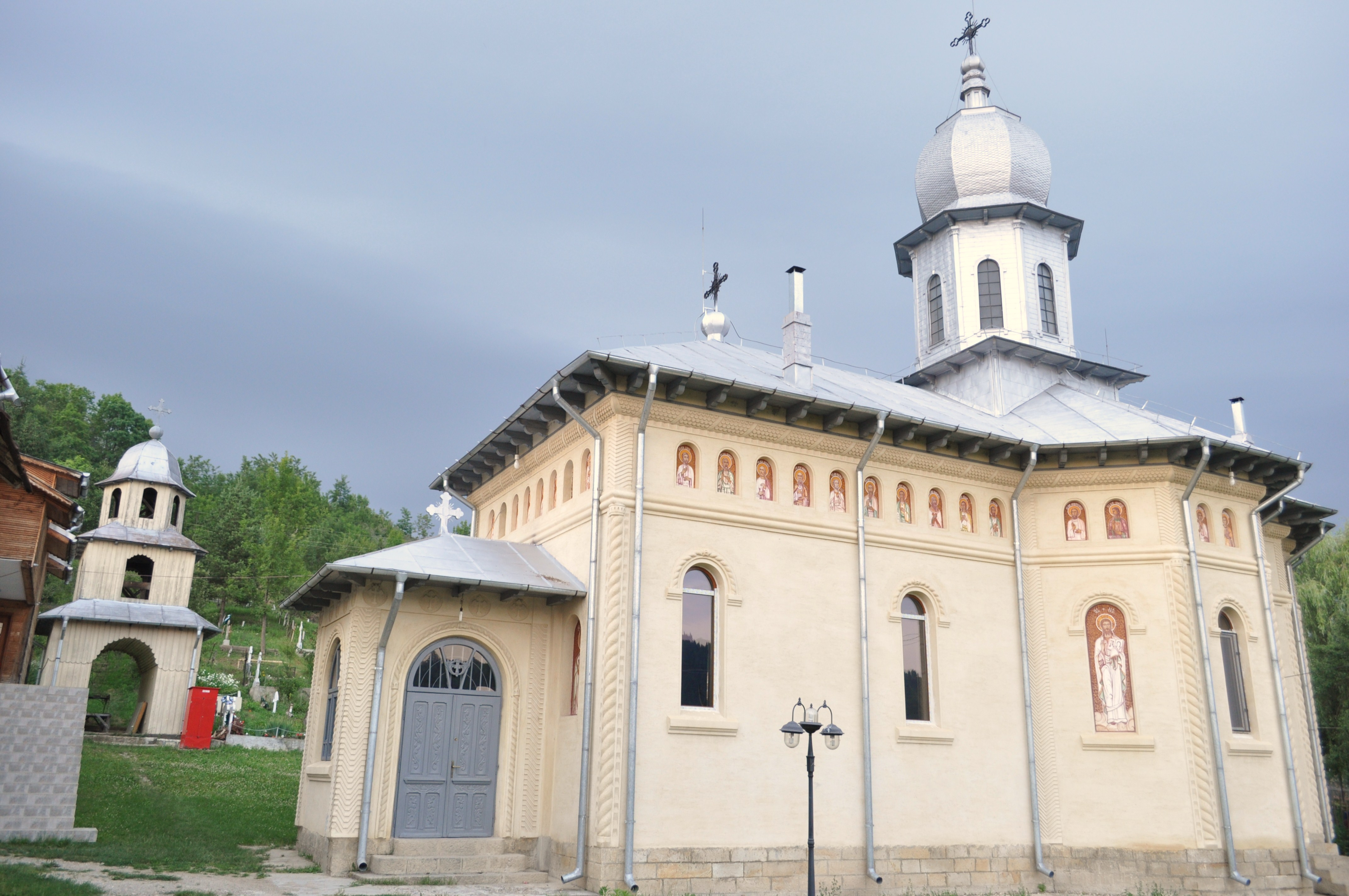
- St. Nicholas Church in Vrâncioaia

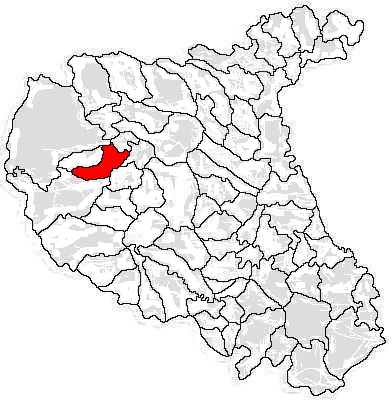
- Location in Vrancea County

- Location in Romania
- Coordinates: 45°51′53″N 26°43′48″E
- Country: Romania
- County: Vrancea

Government
  - Mayor (2024–2028): Ionică Danțiș (PSD)
- Area: 58.9 km^{2} (22.7 sq mi)
- Elevation: 403 m (1,322 ft)
- Population (2021-12-01): 2,162
  - Density: 36.7/km^{2} (95.1/sq mi)
- Time zone: UTC+02:00 (EET)
  - Summer (DST): UTC+03:00 (EEST)
- Postal code: 627445
- Area code: +(40) 237
- Vehicle reg.: VN
- Website: vrancioaia.eprimaria.ro

Vrâncioaia is a commune located in Vrancea County, Romania. It is composed of six villages: Bodești, Muncei, Poiana, Ploștina, Spinești, and Vrâncioaia.

Historical population
Year	Pop.	±%
2002	2,982	—
2011	2,576	−13.6%
2021	2,162	−16.1%
Source: Census data
