= Wydra (surname) =

Wydra is a Polish surname meaning "otter". Notable people with the surname include:

- Dominik Wydra (born 1994), Austrian footballer
- Harald Wydra, British anthropologist
- Karolina Wydra (born 1981), Polish-American actress
- Szymon Wydra (born 1976), Polish rock vocalist
