= Vizantea-Livezi =

- Commune
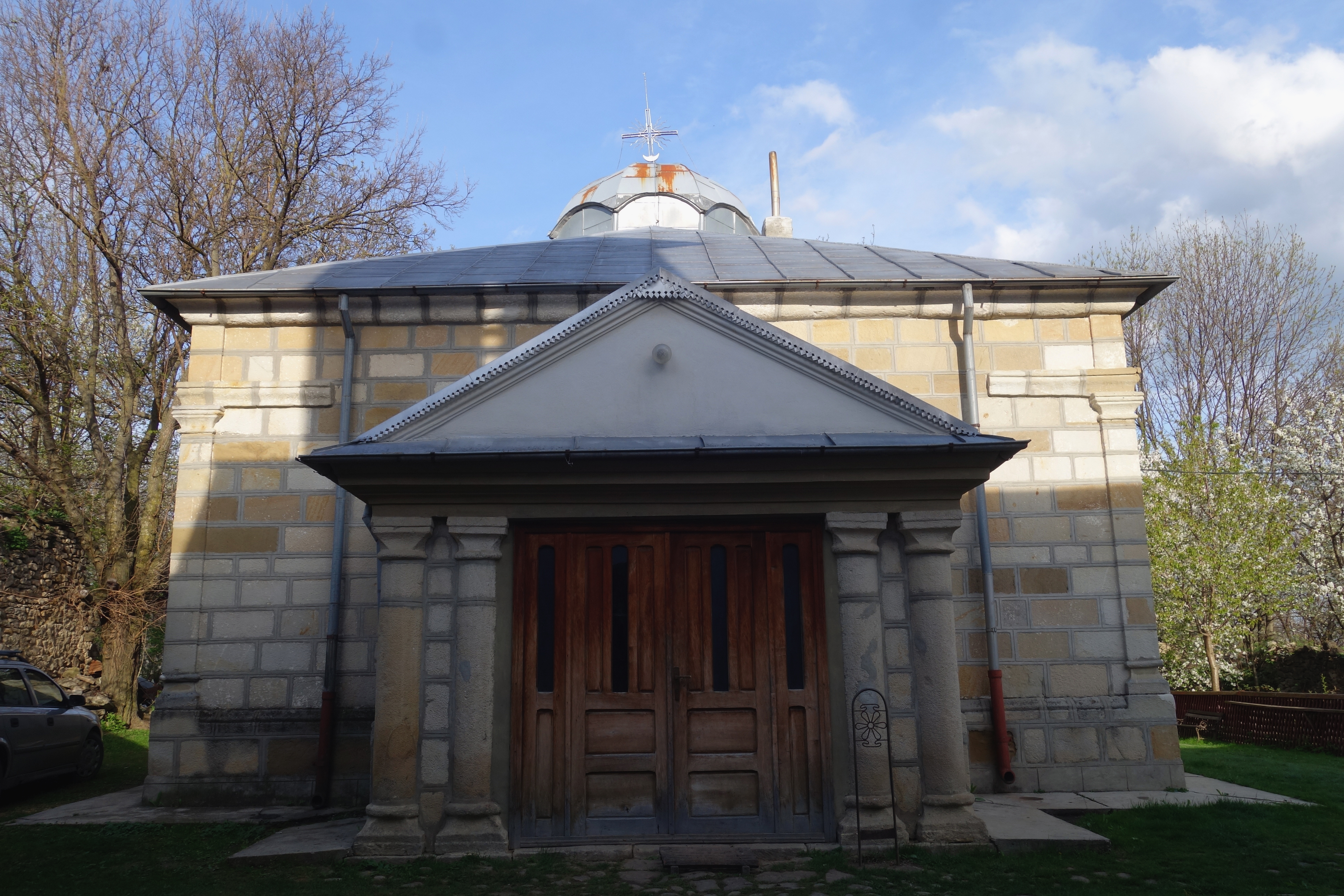
- Vizantea Monastery

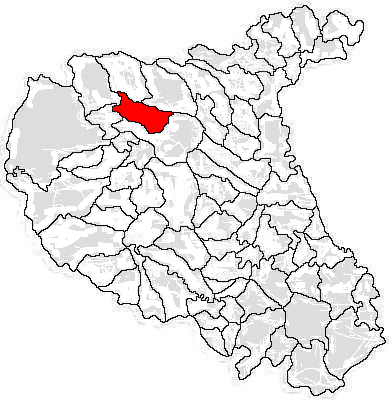
- Location in Vrancea County

- Location in Romania
- Coordinates: 45°57′N 26°50′E
- Country: Romania
- County: Vrancea

Government
  - Mayor (2024–2028): Ciprian Olariu (PNL)
- Area: 77.28 km^{2} (29.84 sq mi)
- Elevation: 337 m (1,106 ft)
- Population (2021-12-01): 3,614
  - Density: 46.77/km^{2} (121.1/sq mi)
- Time zone: UTC+02:00 (EET)
  - Summer (DST): UTC+03:00 (EEST)
- Postal code: 627435
- Area code: +(40) 237
- Vehicle reg.: VN
- Website: www.vizantealivezi.ro

Vizantea-Livezi is a commune located in Vrancea County, Romania. It is composed of five villages: Livezile (the commune center), Mesteacănu, Piscu Radului, Vizantea Mănăstirească, and Vizantea Răzășească. It was formed in 1968 by merging the first three (the former commune of Livezi) with the latter two (the former commune of Vizantea).

Historical population
Year	Pop.	±%
2002	4,220	—
2011	3,793	−10.1%
2021	3,614	−4.7%
Source: Census data

At the 2011 census, the commune had a population of 3,793; of the inhabitants for whom data were available, 99.9% were Romanians; 69.2% were Romanian Orthodox and 30.5% Roman Catholic. At the 2021 census, the population had decreased to 3,614, of which 94.88% were Romanians.
