= Vânători, Vrancea =

Vânători
- Commune
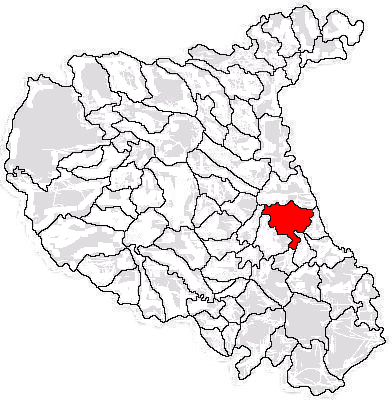
- Location in Vrancea County

- Location in Romania
- Coordinates: 45°44′N 27°15′E
- Country: Romania
- County: Vrancea

Government
  - Mayor (2024–2028): Dănuț Cristian (PSD)
- Area: 86.90 km^{2} (33.55 sq mi)
- Elevation: 41 m (135 ft)
- Population (2021-12-01): 6,624
  - Density: 76/km^{2} (200/sq mi)
- Time zone: EET/EEST (UTC+2/+3)
- Postal code: 627395
- Area code: +(40) 237
- Vehicle reg.: VN
- Website: www.vinatori.primarievn.ro

Vânători is a commune located in Vrancea County, Western Moldavia, Romania. It is composed of seven villages: Balta Raței, Jorăști, Mirceștii Noi, Mirceștii Vechi, Petrești, Rădulești, and Vânători.

Historical population
Year	Pop.	±%
2002	5,529	—
2011	5,164	−6.6%
2021	6,624	+28.3%
Source: Census data
