= Putna (Siret) =

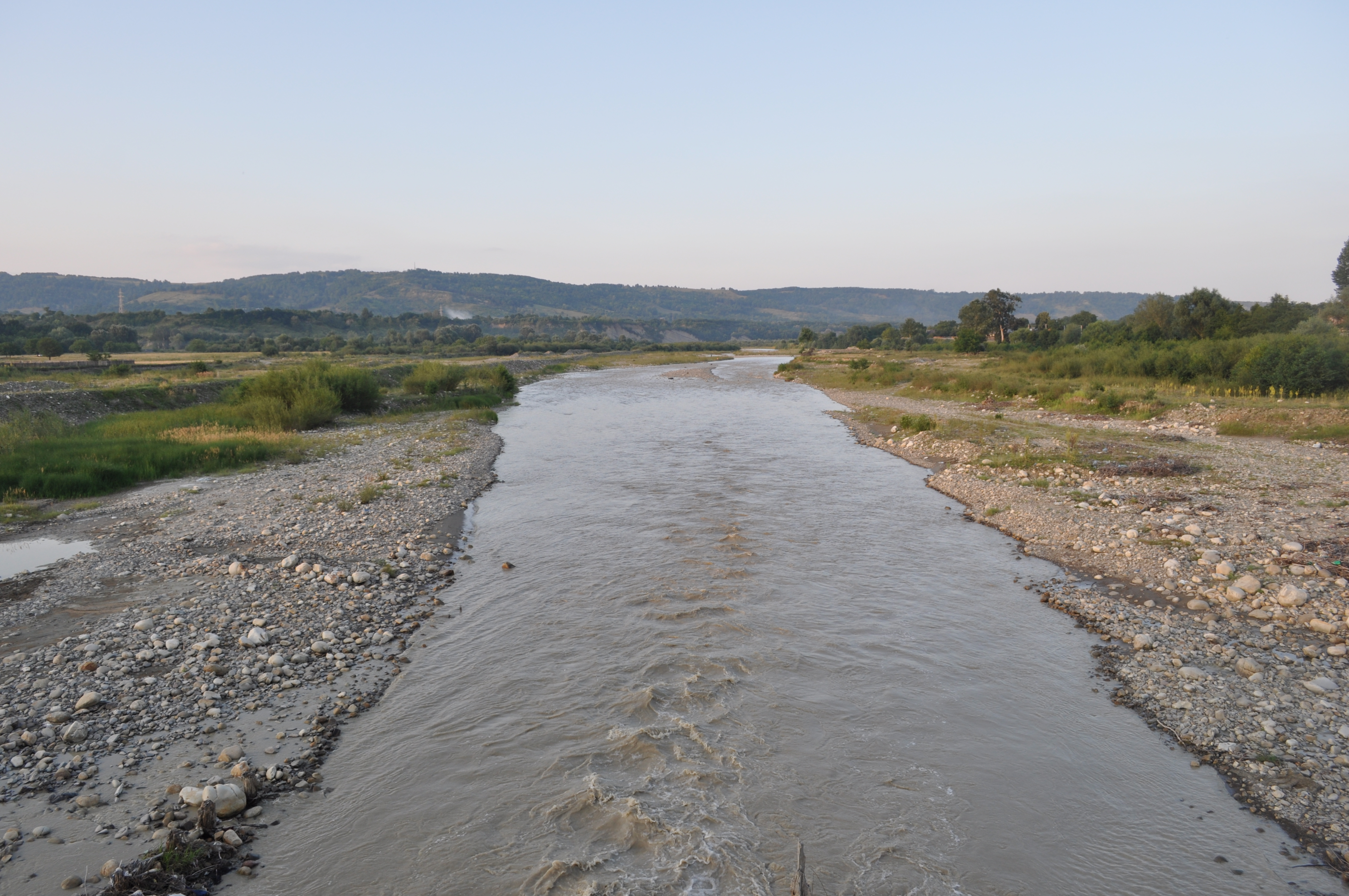

- Location within Romania

Location
- Country: Romania
- Counties: Vrancea County

Physical characteristics
- Source: Lăcăuți-Arișoaia Ridge
  - location: Vrancea Mountains
- Mouth: Siret
  - location: Vulturu
  - coordinates: 45°36′24″N 27°29′49″E
- Length: 153 km (95 mi)
- Basin size: 2,480 km^{2} (960 sq mi)

Basin features
- Progression: Siret→ Danube→ Black Sea
- Tributaries
  - left: Lepșa
  - right: Zăbala, Milcov, Râmna

The Putna is a right tributary of the river Siret in Vrancea County in Romania, in the historical region of Moldavia. It discharges into the Siret in Călienii Noi, near Vulturu.

== Hydrography ==
The Putna's basin has a total surface of 2,480 km^{2} (960 sq mi); 31% of this surface is located in the mountain area, draining the eastern flank of the Vrancea Mountains.

The total length of the Putna from its source to its confluence with the Siret is 153 km (95 mi).

=== Tributaries ===
The following rivers are tributaries to the river Putna (from source to mouth):

- Left: Baba, Șipotu, Valea lui Ilie, Astrog (Stogu), Babovici, Pârâul Mărului, Greșu, Călinu, Slatina, Lepșa, Streiu, Mocearu, Deju, Caciu, Valea Sării, Tichiriș, Vidra, Vizăuți
- Right: Pârâul de sub Arișoaia, Pârâul Bradului, Zburătura, Pârâul Țiganului, Cireșu, Tișița, Pârâul Porcului, Pârâul Câinelui, Carhagău, Coza, Văsui, Zăbala, Chilimetea, Valea Rea, Șoimul, Sturza, Milcov, Râmna

== Towns and villages ==
The following towns and villages are situated along the river Putna, from source to mouth: Greșu, Lepșa, Tulnici, Negrilești, Bârsești, Valea Sării, Vidra, Garoafa, Vânători.
