= Negrilești, Vrancea =

Negrilești
- Commune
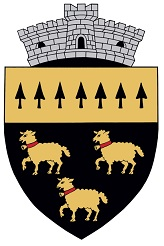
- Coat of arms

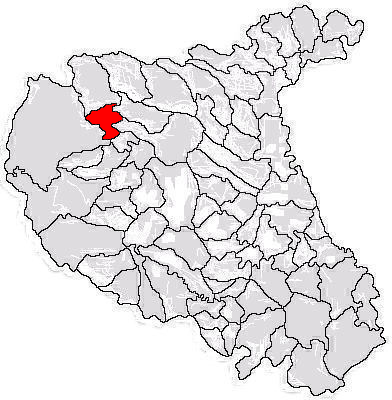
- Location in Vrancea County

- Location in Romania
- Coordinates: 45°56′N 26°42′E
- Country: Romania
- County: Vrancea

Government
  - Mayor (2024–2028): Răzvan-Mihăiță Pantazică (Ind.)
- Area: 34.64 km^{2} (13.37 sq mi)
- Elevation: 495 m (1,624 ft)
- Population (2021-12-01): 1,464
  - Density: 42/km^{2} (110/sq mi)
- Time zone: EET/EEST (UTC+2/+3)
- Postal code: 627021
- Area code: +(40) 237
- Vehicle reg.: VN
- Website: www.primarianegrilesti.ro

Negrilești is a commune located in Vrancea County, Romania. It is composed of a single village, Negrilești. Formerly part of Bârsești, it split off in 2003.

Historical population
Year	Pop.	±%
2002	1,715	—
2011	1,816	+5.9%
2021	1,464	−19.4%
Source: Census data
