= Paltin =

- Commune
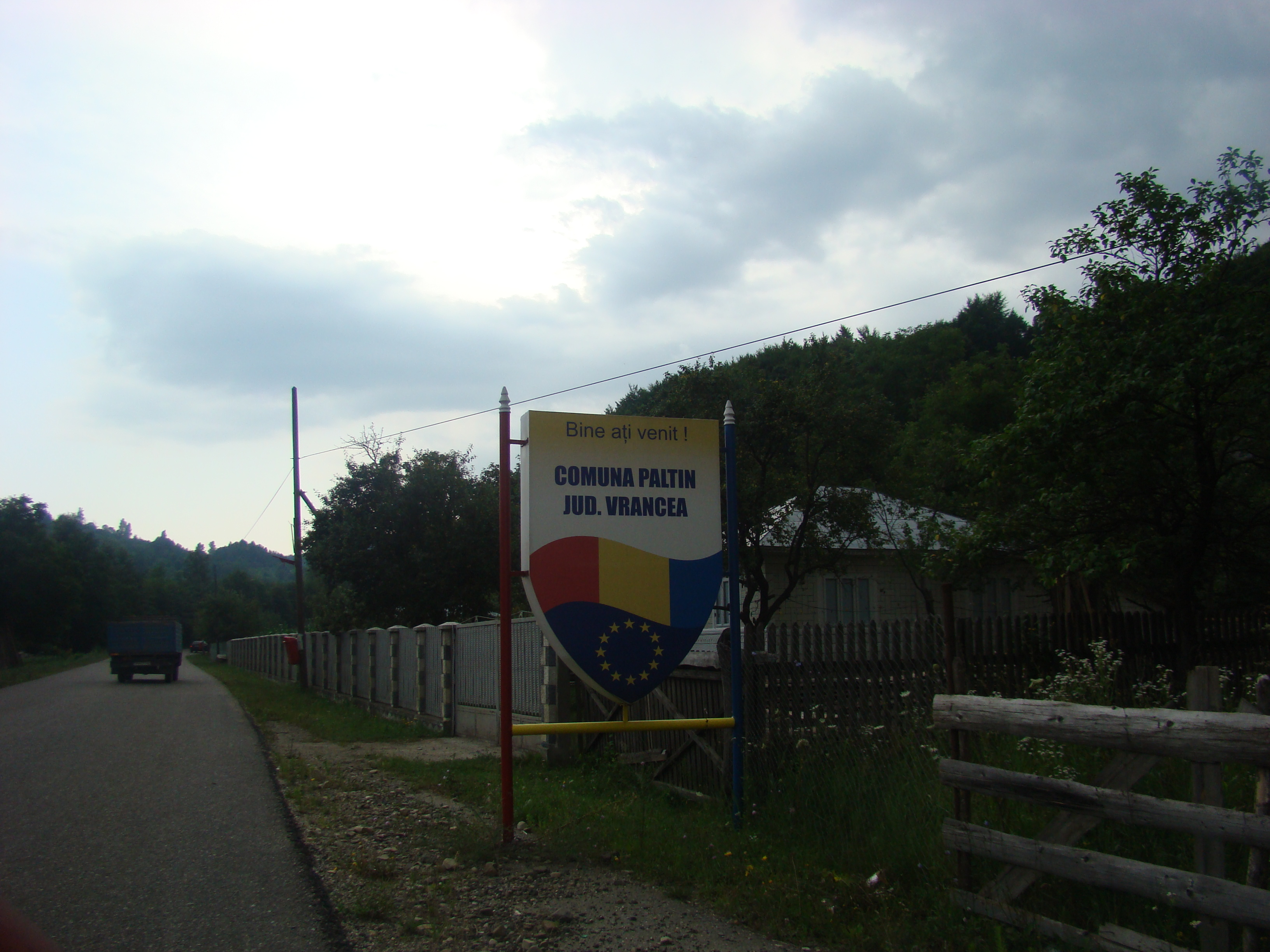
- Entrance sign to the commune

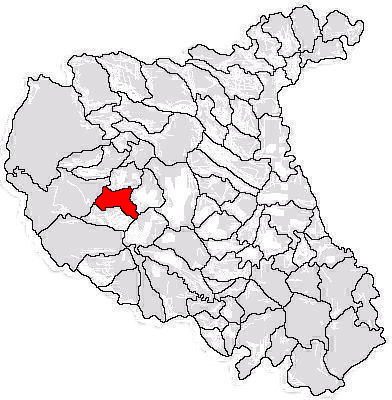
- Location in Vrancea County

- Location in Romania
- Coordinates: 45°46′N 26°43′E
- Country: Romania
- County: Vrancea

Government
  - Mayor (2024–2028): Ion Cocioabă (PSD)
- Area: 37.50 km^{2} (14.48 sq mi)
- Elevation: 453 m (1,486 ft)
- Population (2021-12-01): 1,968
  - Density: 52.48/km^{2} (135.9/sq mi)
- Time zone: UTC+02:00 (EET)
  - Summer (DST): UTC+03:00 (EEST)
- Postal code: 627240
- Area code: +(40) 237
- Vehicle reg.: VN
- Website: www.primariapaltin.ro

Paltin is a commune located in Vrancea County, Romania. It is composed of five villages: Ghebari, Paltin, Prahuda, Țepa, and Vâlcani. It included seven other villages until 2005, when they were split off to form Spulber Commune.

Historical population
Year	Pop.	±%
2002	3,671	—
2011	1,861	−49.3%
2021	1,968	+5.7%
Source: Census data
