= Gugești =

- Commune
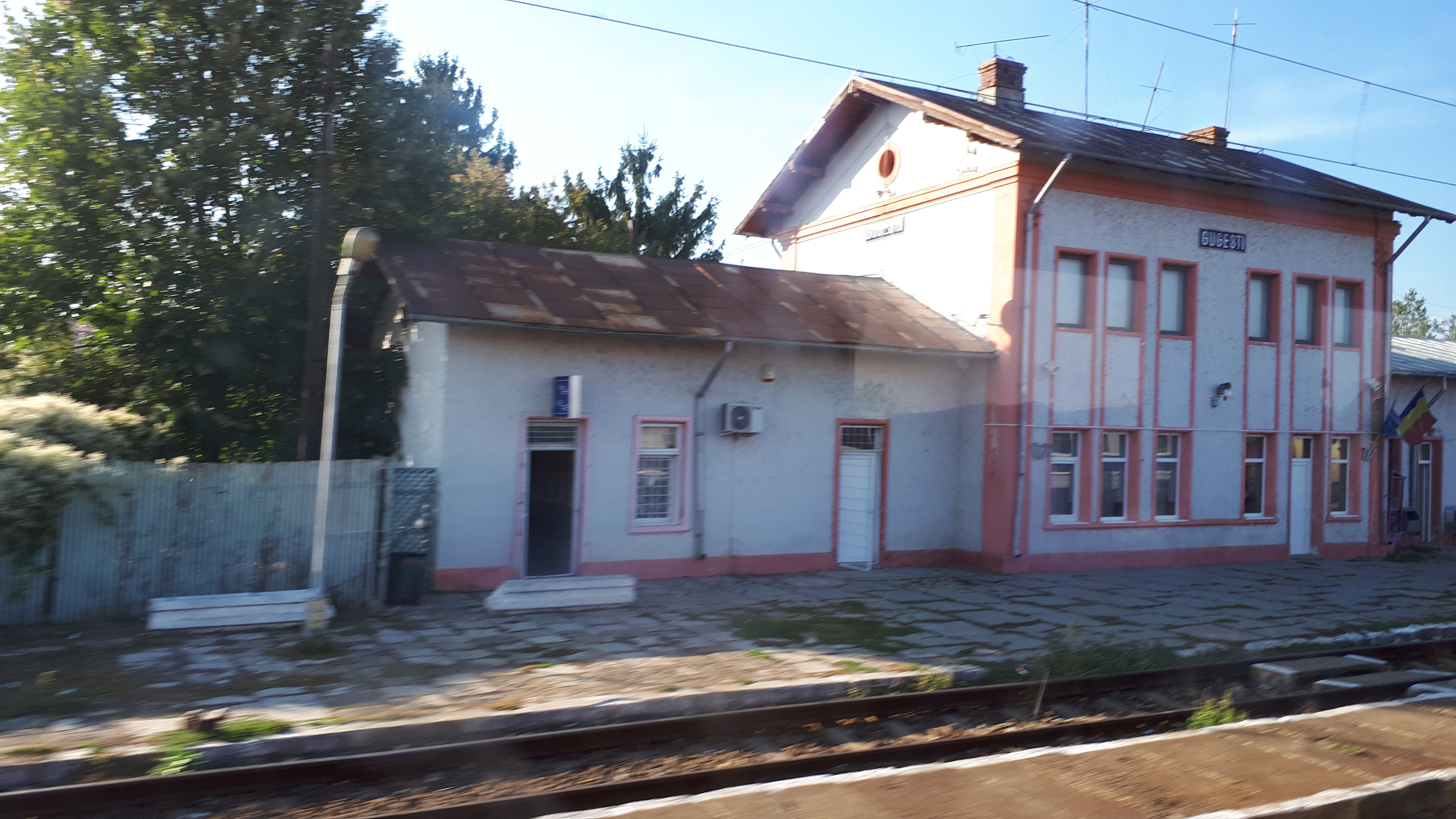
- Gugești railway station

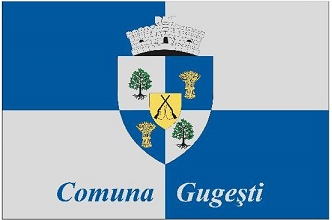
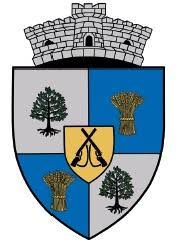
- Flag Coat of arms

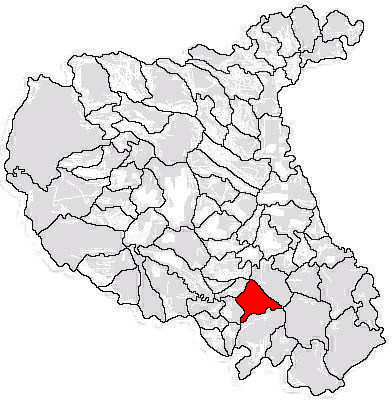
- Location in Vrancea County

- Location in Romania
- Coordinates: 45°34′N 27°08′E
- Country: Romania
- County: Vrancea

Government
  - Mayor (2024–2028): Vasile Vatră (PSD)
- Area: 32.05 km^{2} (12.37 sq mi)
- Elevation: 86 m (282 ft)
- Population (2021-12-01): 6,091
  - Density: 190.0/km^{2} (492.2/sq mi)
- Time zone: UTC+02:00 (EET)
  - Summer (DST): UTC+03:00 (EEST)
- Postal code: 627155
- Area code: +(40) 237
- Vehicle reg.: VN
- Website: primariagugesti.ro

Gugești (Romanian pronunciation: [ɡuˈd͡ʒeʃtʲ]) is a commune located in Vrancea County, Romania. It is composed of two villages, Gugești and Oreavu.

Historical population
Year	Pop.	±%
2002	6,370	—
2011	5,942	−6.7%
2021	6,091	+2.5%
Source: Census data
