= Nistorești =

- Commune
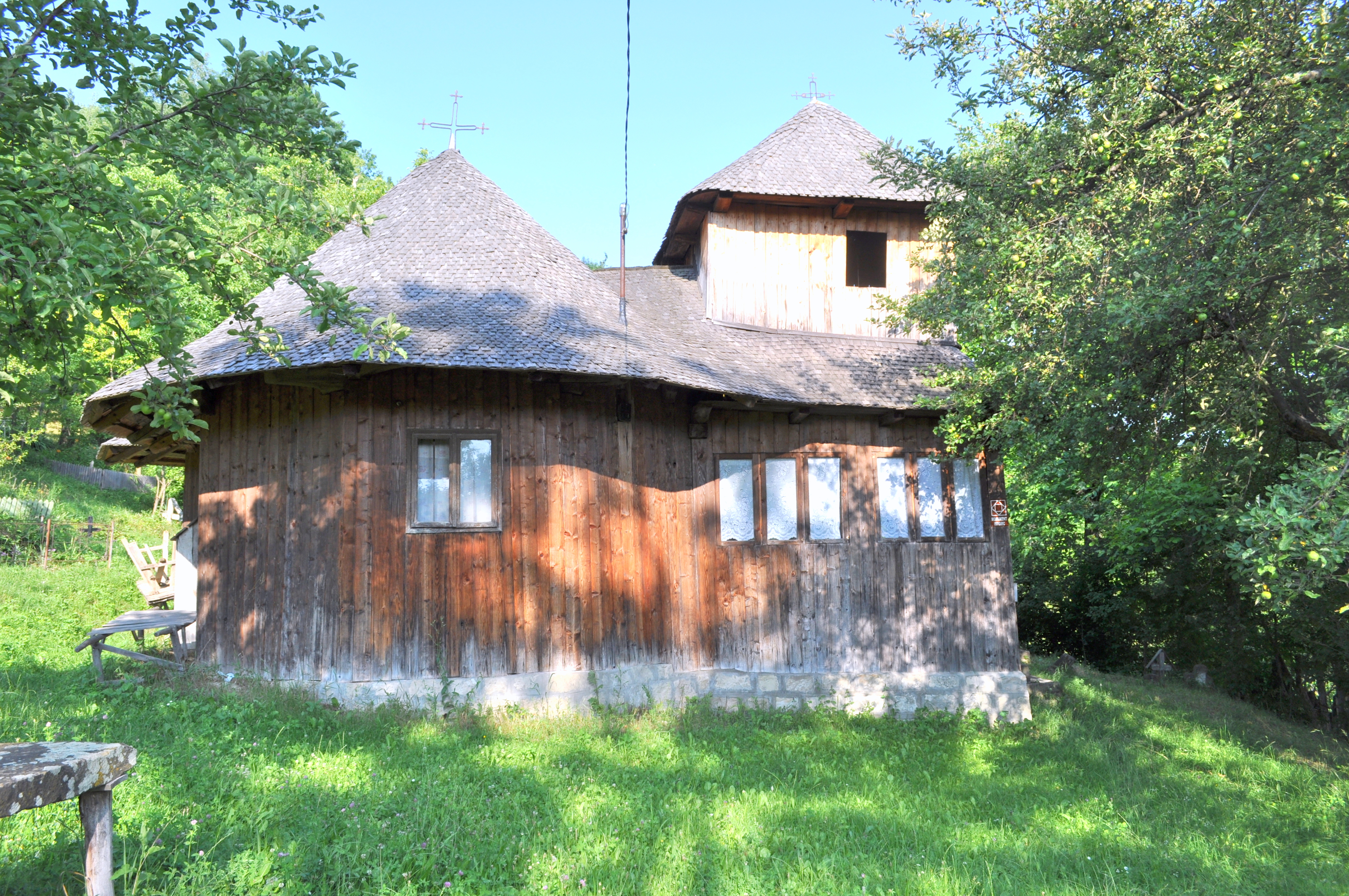
- Wooden church in Nistorești village

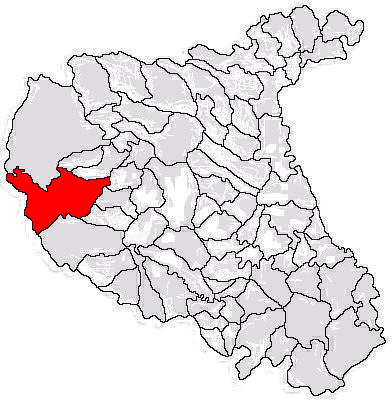
- Location in Vrancea County

- Location in Romania
- Coordinates: 45°49′33″N 26°42′53″E
- Country: Romania
- County: Vrancea

Government
  - Mayor (2024–2028): Teodor Dobre (PSD)
- Area: 250.60 km^{2} (96.76 sq mi)
- Elevation: 414 m (1,358 ft)
- Population (2021-12-01): 1,840
  - Density: 7.34/km^{2} (19.0/sq mi)
- Time zone: UTC+02:00 (EET)
  - Summer (DST): UTC+03:00 (EEST)
- Postal code: 627230
- Area code: +(40) 237
- Vehicle reg.: VN
- Website: www.primarianistoresti.ro

Nistorești is a commune located in Vrancea County, Romania. It is composed of nine villages: Bâtcari, Brădetu, Făgetu, Nistorești, Podu Șchiopului, Românești, Ungureni, Valea Neagră, and Vetrești-Herăstrău.

Historical population
Year	Pop.	±%
2002	2,328	—
2011	1,917	−17.7%
2021	1,840	−4.0%
Source: Census data
