= Năruja =

- Commune
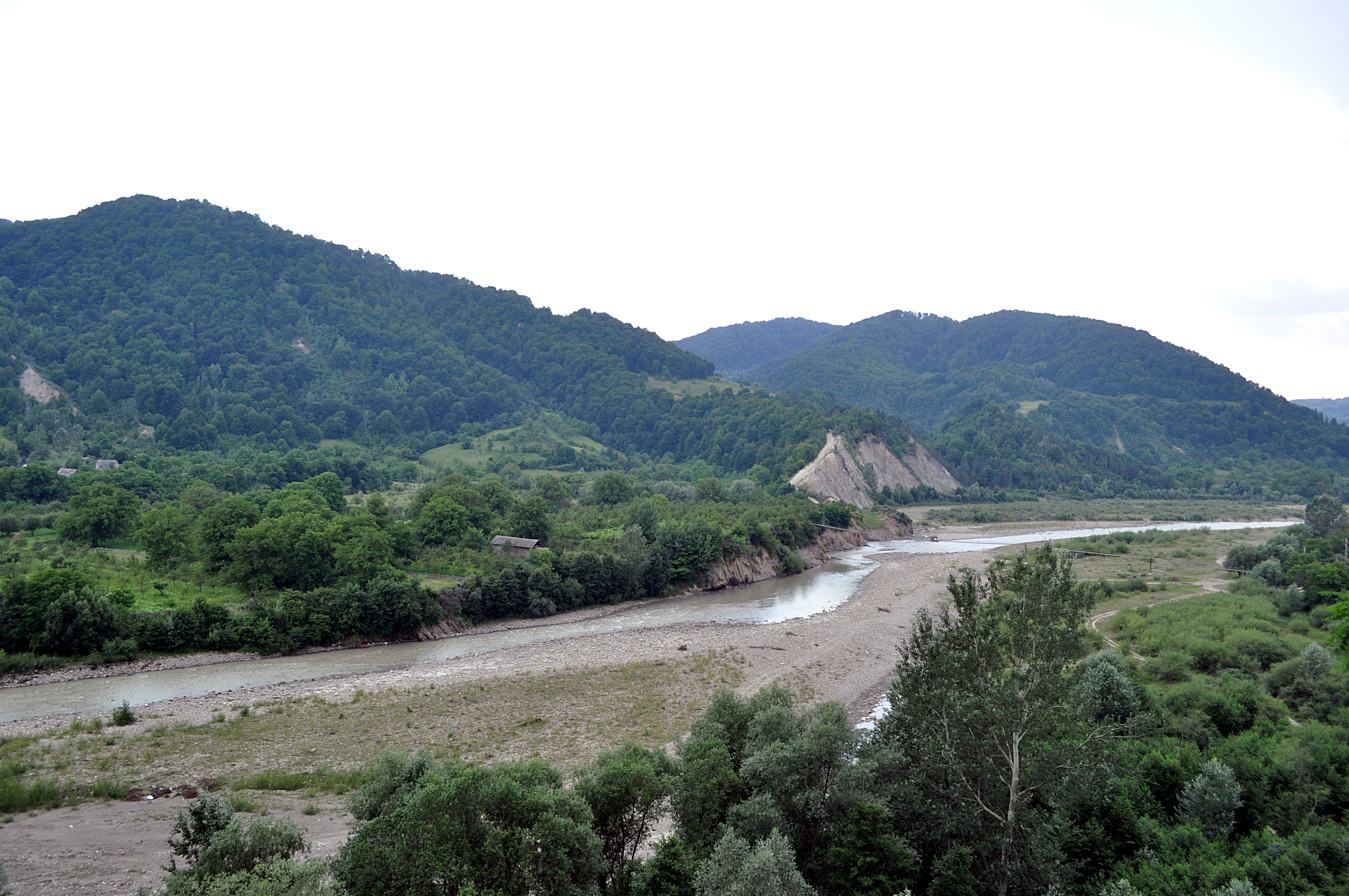
- The Zăbala River flowing through Năruja

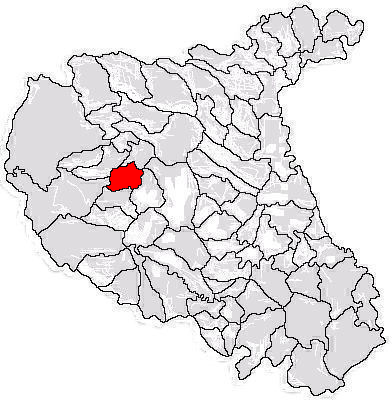
- Location in Vrancea County

- Location in Romania
- Coordinates: 45°50′N 26°47′E
- Country: Romania
- County: Vrancea

Government
  - Mayor (2024–2028): Grigore Mihăeș (PSD)
- Area: 33.37 km^{2} (12.88 sq mi)
- Elevation: 354 m (1,161 ft)
- Population (2021-12-01): 1,806
  - Density: 54.12/km^{2} (140.2/sq mi)
- Time zone: UTC+02:00 (EET)
  - Summer (DST): UTC+03:00 (EEST)
- Postal code: 627220
- Area code: +(40) 237
- Vehicle reg.: VN
- Website: www.primarianaruja.ro

Năruja is a commune located in Vrancea County, Romania. It is composed of five villages: Năruja, Podu Nărujei, Podu Stoica, Rebegari, along with Lunca Narujei.

Historical population
Year	Pop.	±%
2002	1,922	—
2011	1,659	−13.7%
2021	1,806	+8.9%
Source: Census data
