= Vidra, Vrancea =

Vidra
- Commune
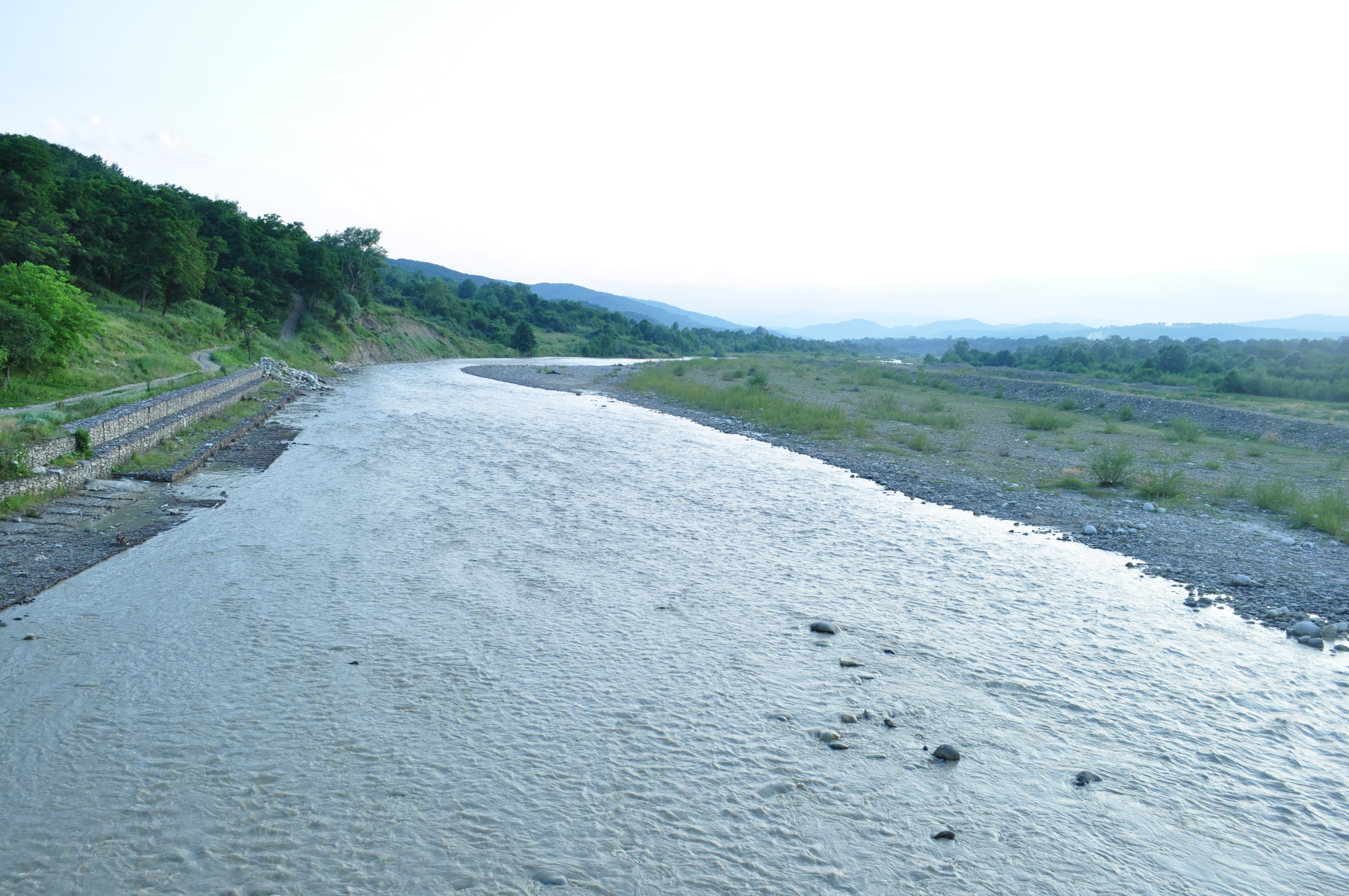
- The Putna River flowing though Vidra

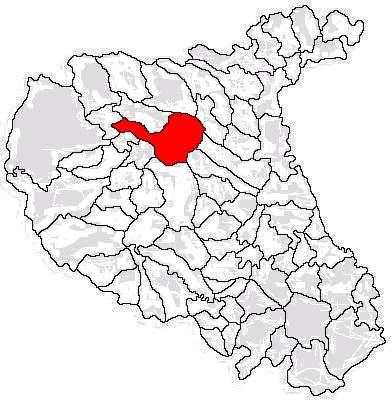
- Location in Vrancea County

- Location in Romania
- Coordinates: 45°55′N 26°54′E
- Country: Romania
- County: Vrancea

Government
  - Mayor (2024–2028): Silviu Pintilie (PSD)
- Area: 122 km^{2} (47 sq mi)
- Elevation: 276 m (906 ft)
- Population (2021-12-01): 5,829
  - Density: 47.8/km^{2} (124/sq mi)
- Time zone: UTC+02:00 (EET)
  - Summer (DST): UTC+03:00 (EEST)
- Postal code: 627415
- Area code: +(40) 237
- Vehicle reg.: VN
- Website: primariavidravn.ro

Vidra is a commune located in Vrancea County, Romania. It is composed of nine villages: Burca, Irești, Ruget, Scafari, Șerbești, Tichiriș, Vidra, Viișoara, and Voloșcani.

Historical population
Year	Pop.	±%
2002	7,469	—
2011	6,295	−15.7%
2021	5,829	−7.4%
Source: Census data

== Natives ==
- Ionel Badiu (born 1989), rugby union player
- Valeriu Cotea (1926–2016), oenologist
