= Tulnici =

- Commune
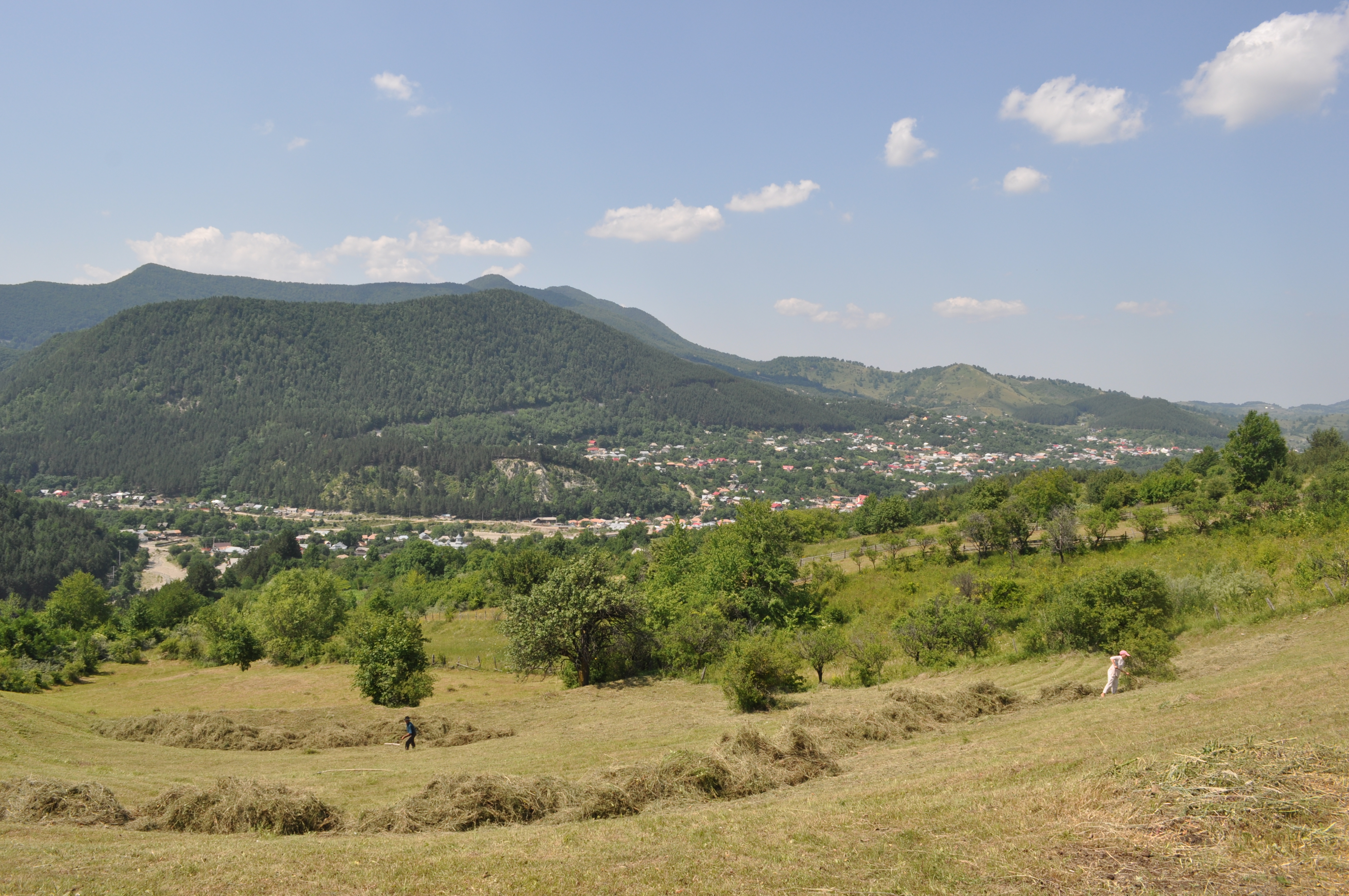
- Tulnici village

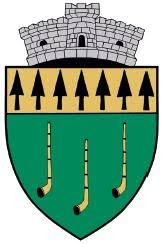
- Coat of arms

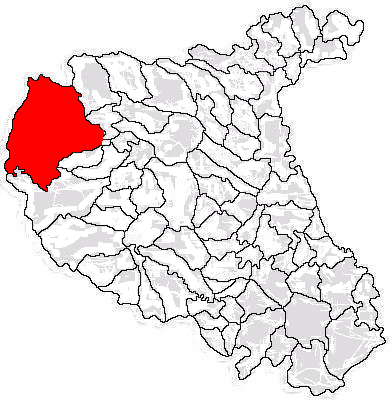
- Location in Vrancea County

- Location in Romania
- Coordinates: 45°55′N 26°40′E
- Country: Romania
- County: Vrancea
- Subdivisions: Coza, Greșu, Lepșa, Tulnici

Government
  - Mayor (2024–2028): Aurel Boțu (PNL)
- Area: 275.76 km^{2} (106.47 sq mi)
- Elevation: 512 m (1,680 ft)
- Population (2021-12-01): 4,137
  - Density: 15.00/km^{2} (38.86/sq mi)
- Time zone: UTC+02:00 (EET)
  - Summer (DST): UTC+03:00 (EEST)
- Postal code: 627305
- Area code: +(40) 237
- Vehicle reg.: VN
- Website: tulnici.primarievn.ro

Tulnici is a commune in Vrancea County, Romania, located in the northwestern part of the county. It is one of the largest administrative areas in Vrancea County, situated at an altitude of 512 m (1,680 ft) above sea level at the foothills of the Vrancea Mountains. The commune is composed of four villages: Coza, Greșu, Lepșan, and Tulnici, extending over an area of 27,576 hectares (68,140 acres). It also included two other villages until 2003, when these were split off to form Păulești Commune. Tulnici was attested around the year 1466.

Historical population
Year	Pop.	±%
2002	3,698	—
2011	3,450	−6.7%
2021	4,137	+19.9%
Source: Census data

== See also ==
- Gălăciuc

== Notes ==
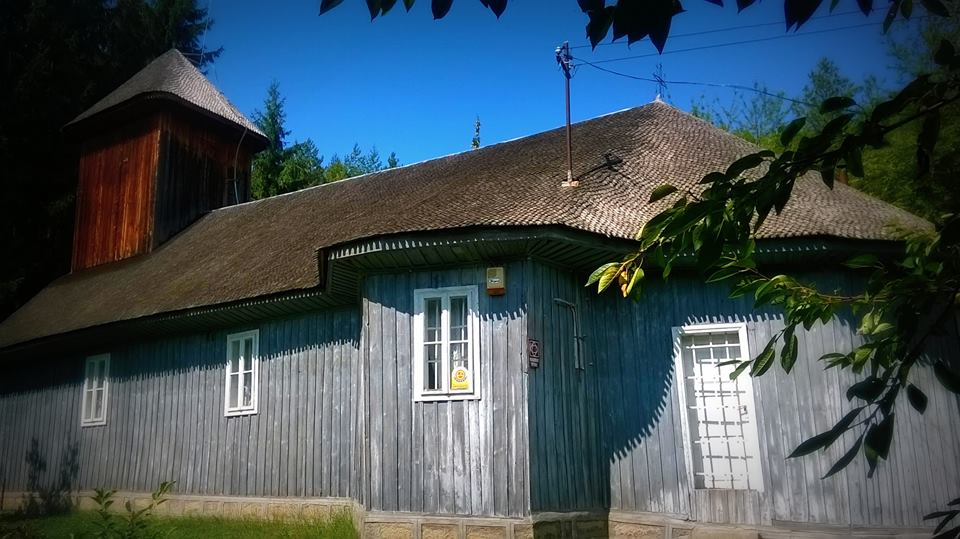
Saint John the Baptist Church in Coza

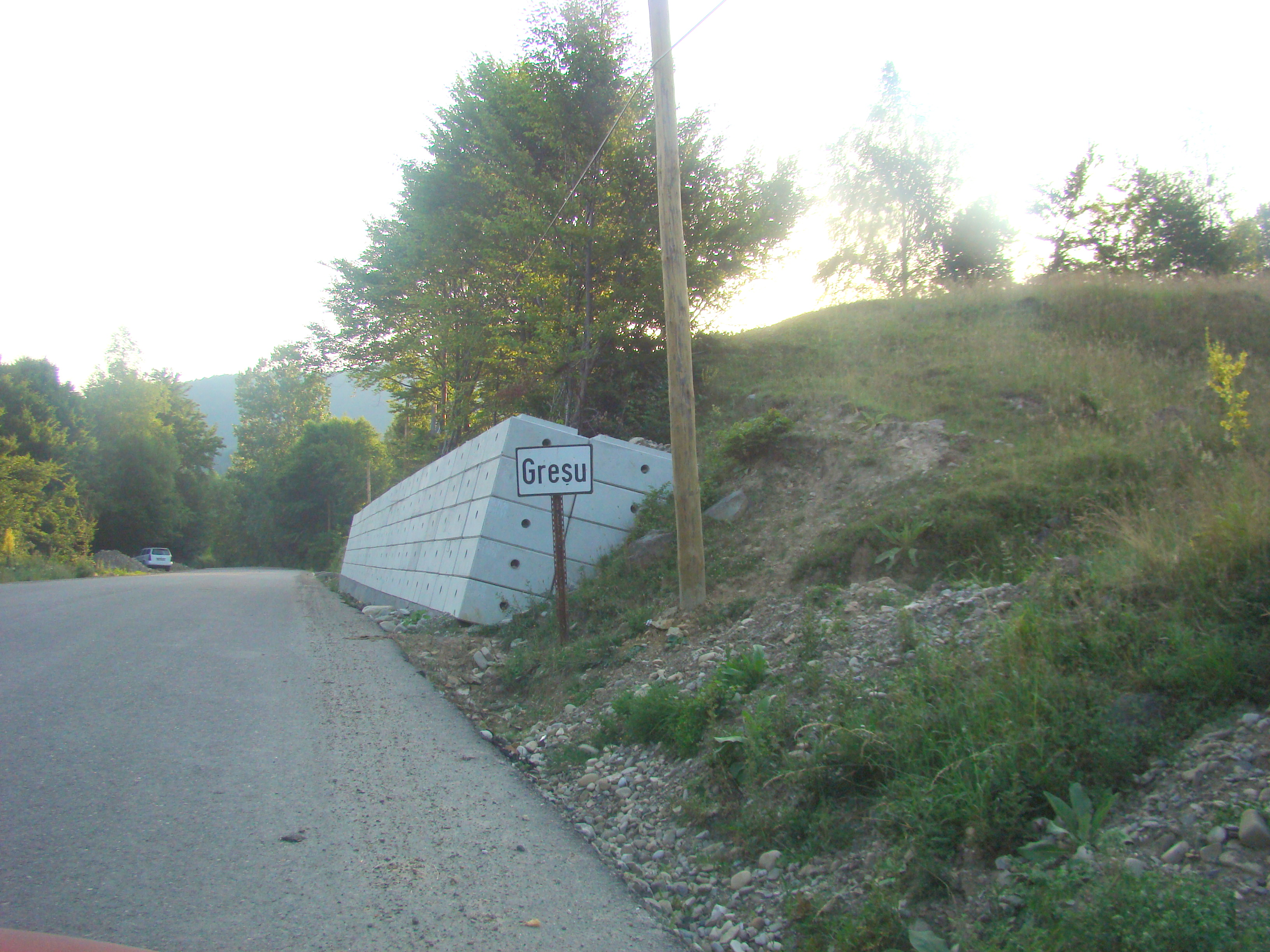
Entry sign to Greșu

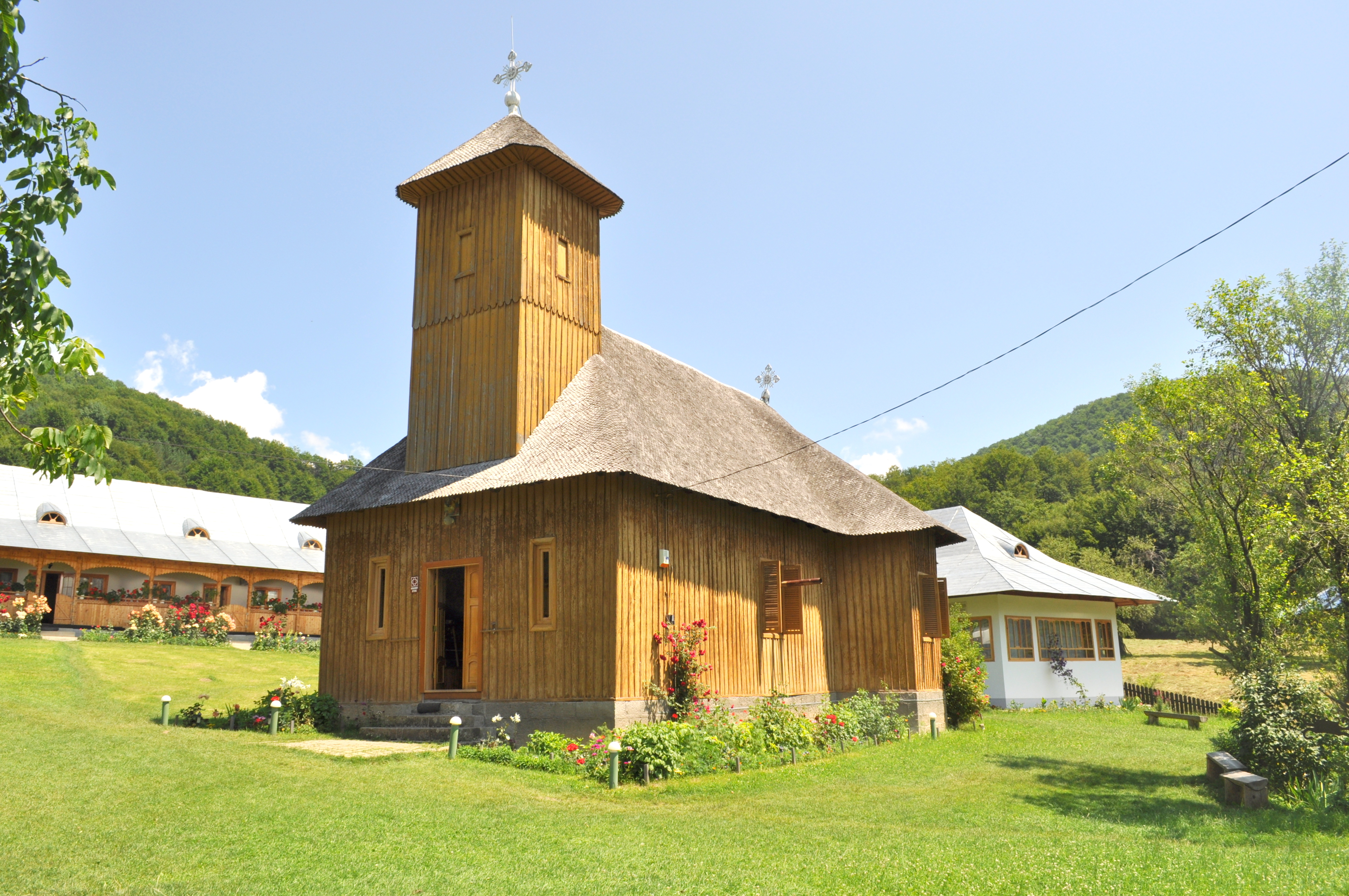
Lepșa Monastery

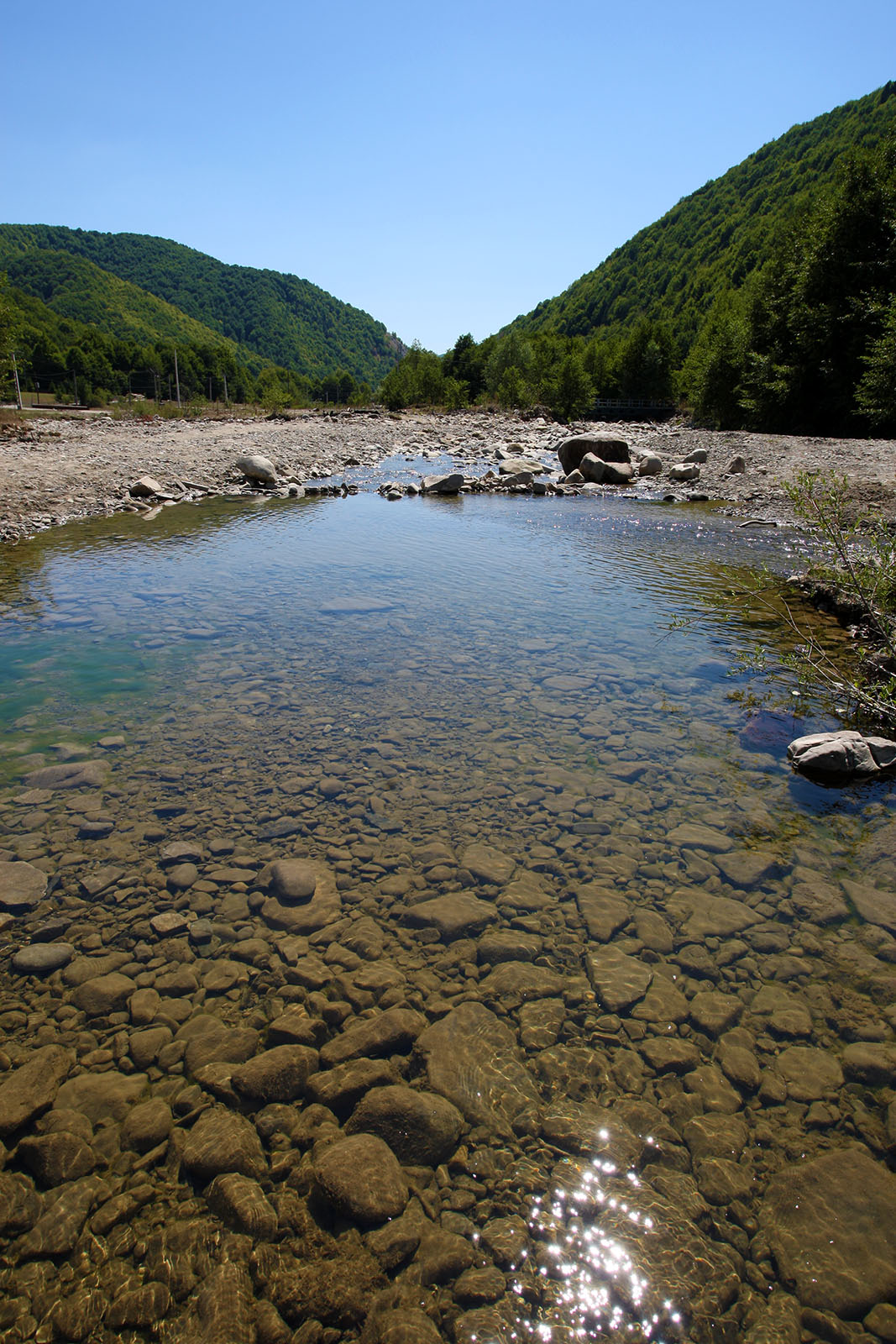
The River Putna in Lepșa
