= Valea Sării =

- Commune
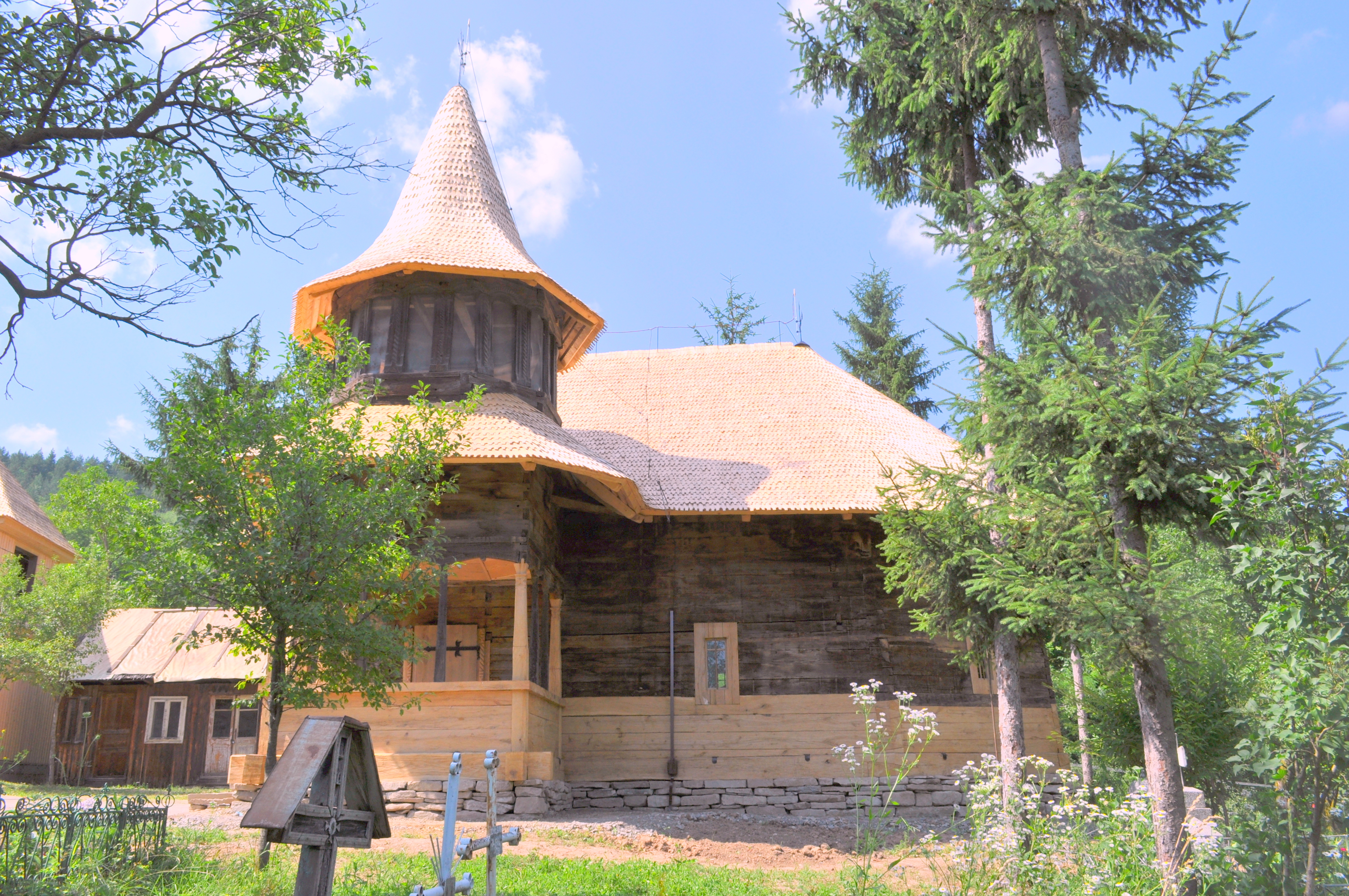
- Wooden church in Valea Sării

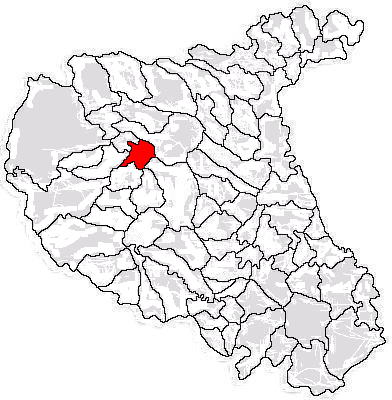
- Location in Vrancea County

- Location in Romania
- Coordinates: 45°53′N 26°47′E
- Country: Romania
- County: Vrancea

Government
  - Mayor (2024–2028): Valentin Marcu (PSD)
- Area: 54.24 km^{2} (20.94 sq mi)
- Elevation: 348 m (1,142 ft)
- Population (2021-12-01): 1,899
  - Density: 35.01/km^{2} (90.68/sq mi)
- Time zone: UTC+02:00 (EET)
  - Summer (DST): UTC+03:00 (EEST)
- Postal code: 627390
- Area code: +(40) 237
- Vehicle reg.: VN
- Website: www.primaria-valea-sarii.ro

Valea Sării is a commune located in Vrancea County, Romania. It is composed of five villages: Colacu, Mătăcina, Poduri, Prisaca, and Valea Sării.

A wayside cross in Prisaca, built in 1941, commemorates the soldiers who died in the Romanian War of Independence and in World War I.

Historical population
| Year | Pop. | ±% |
|---|---|---|
| 2002 | 2,102 | — |
| 2011 | 1,608 | −23.5% |
| 2021 | 1,899 | +18.1% |
Source: Census data
