= Mongol invasion of Thrace =

Mongol invasion of Thrace may refer to:

- Mongol invasion of the Latin Empire (1242)
- Mongol invasion of Byzantine Thrace (1264–1265)
- Battle of the Maritsa river (1284)
- Mongol invasion of Byzantine Thrace (1324)
