= Roman Catholic Diocese of Cumania =

Latin-rite bishopric west of the Siret River 1228

The Roman Catholic Diocese of Cumania was a Latin-rite bishopric west of the Siret River (in present-day Romania) from 1228 to 1241. The lands incorporated into the diocese had been dominated by the nomadic Cumans since about 1100. Catholic missions began after Andrew II of Hungary granted Burzenland to the Teutonic Knights in 1211. After Andrew expelled the Knights from the territory in 1225, Dominican friars continued the Cuman mission. Robert, Archbishop of Esztergom baptized Boricius, an influential Cuman chieftain, two years later.

Robert ordained a Hungarian Dominican friar, Theodoric, as the first bishop of Cumania in early 1228. Pope Gregory IX confirmed Theodoric's consecration on 21 March of that year, and the diocese was subordinate to the Holy See in 1229. The episcopal see was on the Milcov River, but its exact location is unknown. The diocese included Burzenland and lands east of the Carpathian Mountains. Vlachs (Romanians) who belonged to the Orthodox Church were a significant part of the diocese's population. They did not follow the Catholic bishop, and persuaded many Catholic Hungarians and Saxons to accept their Orthodox bishops.

The diocese was destroyed during the Mongol invasion of Europe in 1241, and its property was seized by neighboring landowners. A Franciscan friar was ordained to the see in 1334, but he and his successors (who bore the title Bishop of Milkovia) could not restore the bishopric and its estates.

== History ==
=== Background (before 1211) ===
The Cumans were pagans who worshipped the sky, the earth and other natural elements.

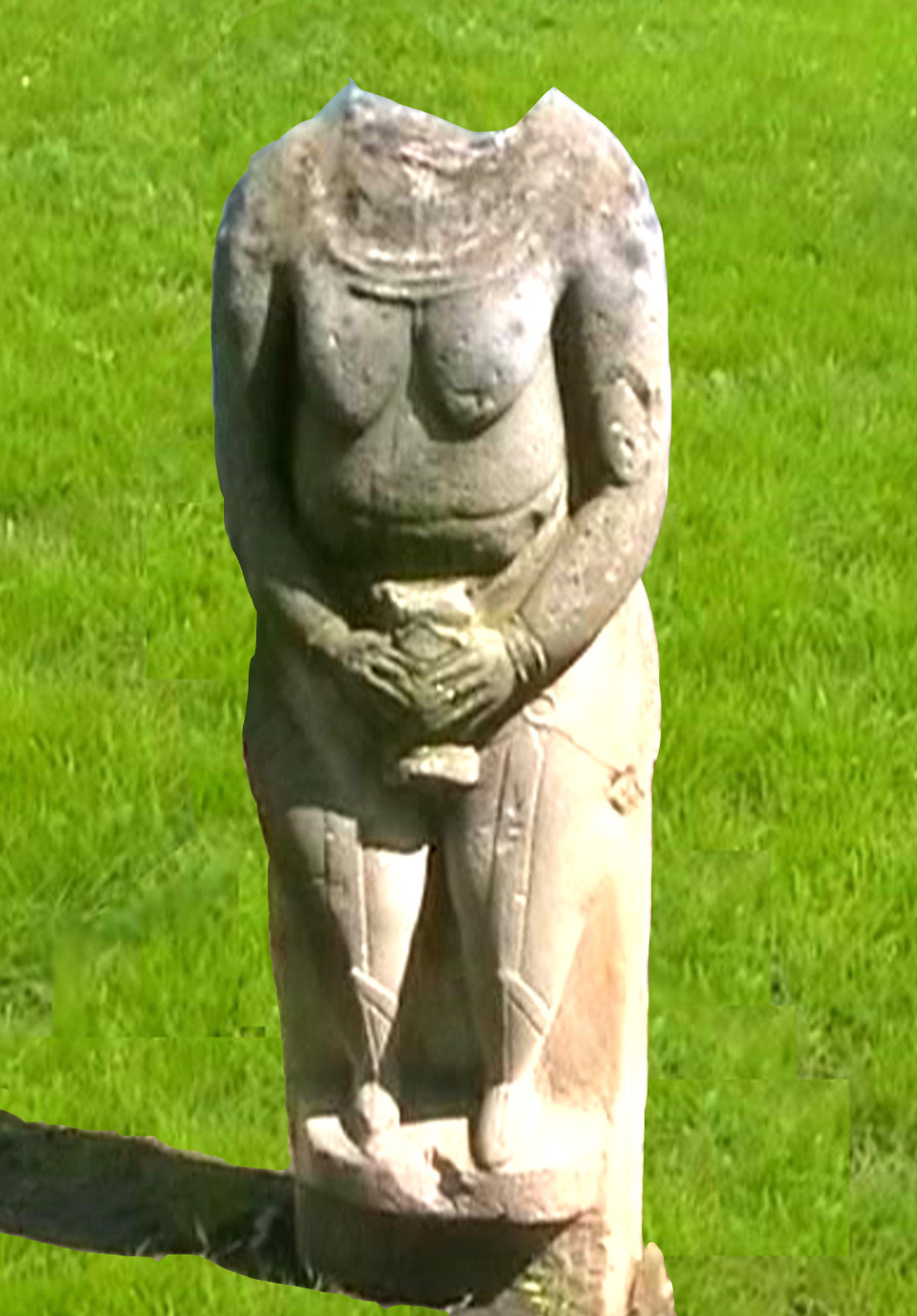
Cuman anthropomorphic female statue originally set up as a funerary stele in today's Ukraine

The nomadic Cumans controlled the lands north of the Lower Danube and east of the Carpathian Mountains after about 1100. Archaeological research indicates that most settlements in the territory had been abandoned by that time. According to John Kinnamos, a Byzantine army which invaded the Kingdom of Hungary in 1166 "had passed through some wearisome and rugged regions and had gone through a land entirely bereft of men" before entering Hungary across the Eastern Carpathians. Twelfth-century Sicilian Muslim geographer Muhammad al-Idrisi wrote that the two Cuman groups (the Black Cumans and White Cumans) were separated from each other by the Dniester River. Describing the eastern borders of the Kingdom of Hungary around 1150, Otto of Freising mentioned the "open land of the Patzinaks and the Falones" (the Pechenegs and Cumans, respectively). He described the territory as a "very fine hunting ground practically untouched by plow and hoe", suggesting a lack of agriculture. However, archaeological research has indicated that local inhabitants practiced agriculture in the Prut-region settlements during the 11th and 12th centuries. According to the Hypatian Codex, Prince Ivan Rostyslavych Berladnik, a claimant to the Principality of Halych (or Galicia), "did harm to the Galician fishermen" on the Lower Danube, implying that portions of the lands between the Eastern Carpathians and the river were controlled by the princes of Halych.

According to Niketas Choniates's chronicle, "the Vlachs, who had heard rumors" of the escape of Andronikos Komnenus (a rebellious cousin of the Byzantine Emperor Manuel I), captured him in 1164 at the borders of Halych. Choniates reported that Vlachs, Slavs and Cumans also inhabited the lands between the Carpathians and the Lower Danube, and the Vlachs' cooperation with the Cumans against the Byzantine Empire is well-documented. According to Anna Comnena, local Vlachs showed "the way through the passes" of the Balkan Mountains to Cumans who invaded the Byzantine lands south of the Lower Danube in 1094. Peter and Asen, leaders of the 1186 rebellion of the Bulgarians and Vlachs against Byzantine rule, crossed the Lower Danube to seek assistance from the Cumans in the summer of 1186 and returned "with their Cuman auxiliaries" to continue the fight. "Cumans, with a division of Vlachs, crossed" the Lower Danube and invaded Thrace in 1199.

However, conflicts between the Cumans and the Vlachs were also recorded. According to a 1250 royal charter, King Andrew I of Hungary dispatched Joachim, Count of Hermannstadt, to lead an army of Saxon, Vlach, Székely and Pecheneg warriors to assist Boril in Bulgaria after "three chieftains from Cumania" rebelled against Boril of Bulgaria in the early 1210s. The reference to the Vlachs' participation in Joachim's campaign is some of the earliest evidence of Vlach communities subjected to Hungarian rule. The Vlachs had a special status, distinct from other commoners in the Kingdom of Hungary. They paid in-kind taxes, such as a quinquagesima (one-fiftieth) on their herds; being Orthodox, they were exempt from the tithes paid by Catholic peasants.

=== Conversion of Cuman tribes (1211–1228) ===
King Andrew II of Hungary granted Burzenland in southeastern Transylvania to the Teutonic Knights in 1211, tasking them with defending his kingdom's borders and converting the neighboring Cumans. The king also authorized the Knights to erect wooden fortresses and expand their authority over the Carpathians. The Knights were allowed to invite colonists to their lands, and settlers were exempted from church tithes. According to a non-authentic papal bull written almost a decade later, their territory extended as far as the lower Danube and the "borders of the Brodniks" (the Siret region) in 1222. Papal letters also stated that an unspecified number of Cumans and their wives and children were willing to convert after the Knights defeated them. The Cumans' power diminished sharply after the Mongol victory over a coalition of Rus' princes and Cuman chieftains in the 23 May 1223 Battle of the Kalka River.

The Teutonic Knights attempted to overthrow King Andrew, and asked Pope Honorius III to protect their lands. The king invaded the Knights' domain, expelling them in 1225. Andrew made his oldest son, Béla, Duke of Transylvania the following year. Duke Béla, who wanted to expand his authority over the neighboring Cuman tribes, supported the Dominican friars' missionary activities.

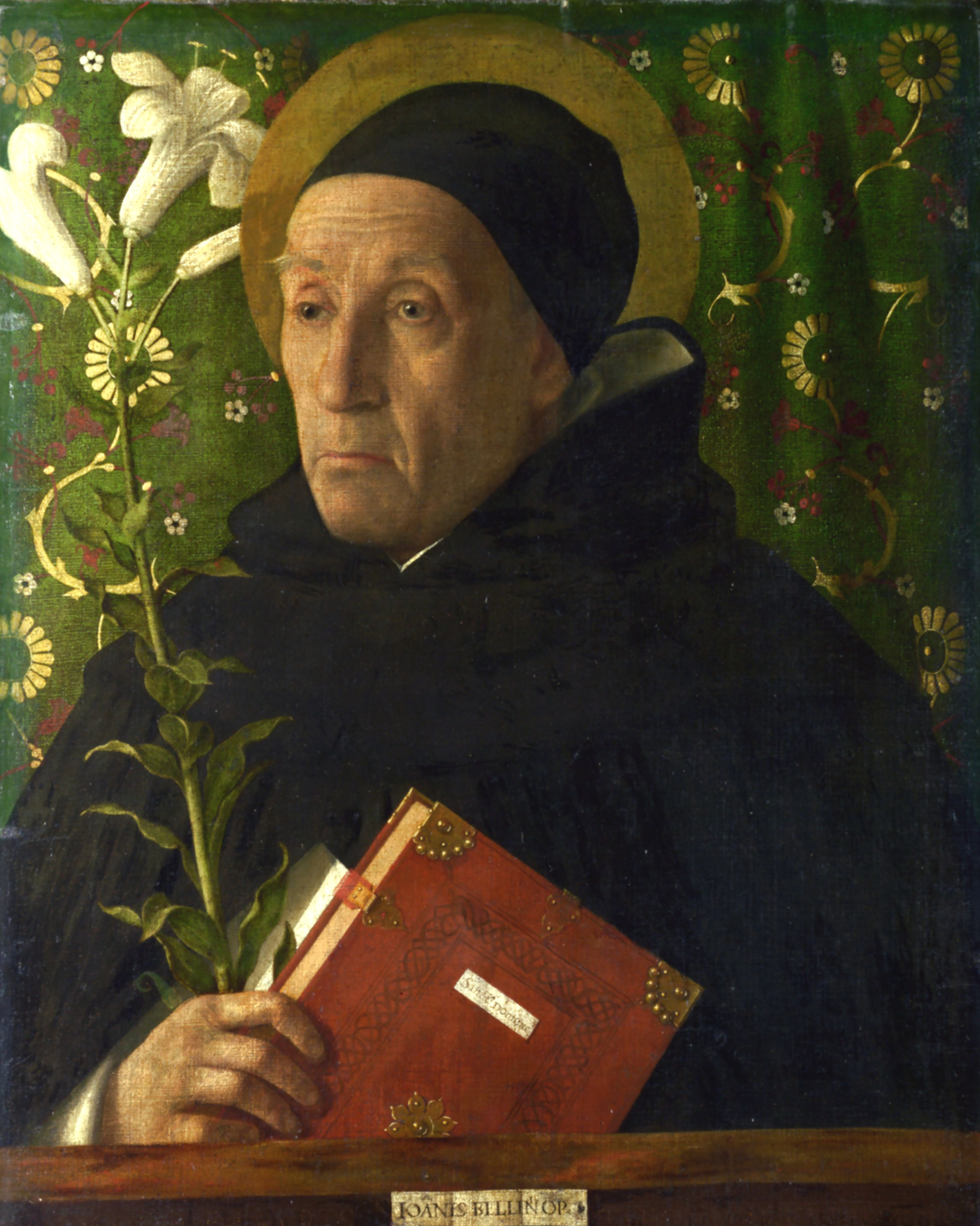
Giovanni Bellini's portrait of St. Dominic, who decided to convert the Cumans before his death

According to Friar Rudolf of Faenza's testimony during Saint Dominic's canonization, the founder of the Dominican Order "wanted to save all men, Christian and Saracens, but especially the Cumans and other pagans" and expressed "his desire to go to the Cumans and other infidels". The Dominican province of Hungary, one of the order's first territories, was created in the early 1220s. Paulus Hungarus, its first head, "decided to send some virtuous brothers" to the Cumans in the early 1220s; according to The Lives of the Brethren, written during the 1250s by Friar Gerard de Frachet, they were unsuccessful and returned. De Frachet wrote that the next Dominican mission to the Cumans reached the Dnieper River, but the friars "suffered hunger, thirst, lack of covering and persecutions; some of them were held captive and two were killed".

Historian Claudia F. Dobre wrote that the "way for the Cumans' conversion was opened" after their defeat at the Kalka River, due to Duke Béla's support of the Dominican missionaries. The nearly-contemporaneous Alberic of Trois-Fontaines wrote that a Cuman chieftain's son visited Robert, Archbishop of Esztergom in Hungary in 1227, asking the archbishop to baptize him and his 12 retainers. The Cuman nobleman also reported that his father and his 2,000 subjects were also willing to come to Transylvania to be baptized. Robert accepted the offer and went to Transylvania with three Hungarian prelates: Bartholomew le Gros, Bishop of Pécs; Bartholomew, Bishop of Veszprém, and Raynald of Belleville, Bishop of Transylvania. According to the chronicle of Emo of Friesland, they met the Cuman chieftain "Boricius, fourth in rank among the major Cuman leaders" and baptized him and his retainers in the presence of Duke Béla.

The number of Cumans baptised with their chief varies from source to source. Emo specified a "large number", Alberic noted 15,000, and the Austrian chronicles Vatzonis, Leobiense and Claustroneuburgense described 10,000 converts. According to The Lives of the Brethren, another Cuman chieftain who was "an even more important leader" was baptized "with about a thousand of his kinsmen". In a 31 July 1228 letter to Archbishop Robert of Esztergom, Pope Gregory IX expressed joy at the missionaries' success in "Cumania" and the neighboring "land of the Brodniks".

=== Creation and fall (1228–1241) ===
The conversion of thousands of Cumans was followed by the creation of the bishopric of Cumania. According to Alberic of Trois-Fontaines, Archbishop Robert of Esztergom consecrated Theodoric bishop of the new diocese in 1228. The consecration of Theodoric, who had been a monk in the Dominican province of Hungary, was confirmed by Pope Gregory on 21 March. The pope urged the head of the Hungarian Dominicans to send new missionaries to the Cumans and praised Duke Béla, who had decided to visit Cumania with Archbishop Robert.

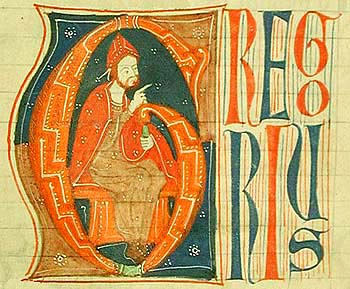
Pope Gregory IX, who confirmed the establishment of the Diocese of Cumania

According to Pope Gregory's 1228 letter, the nomadic Cumans were willing to settle in newly established villages and towns and build churches. However, relations between the Cumans and their priests were often tense; the pope advised Bishop Theodoric of Cumania in 1229 to show mercy to the newly converted Cumans who had attacked clerics and not punish them for minor crimes. The pope exempted the Diocese of Cumania from the authority of the Archbishops of Esztergom on 13 September 1229, subjecting its bishop directly to the Holy See. Gregory IX urged King Andrew II of Hungary to allow the Teutonic Knights to return to Cumania in at least four letters between 1231 and 1234. Nevertheless, Hungary remained the principal ally of the Holy See in Southeastern Europe; Andrew II emphasized his claim to the newly conquered lands by adopting the title "King of Cumania" in the early 1230s. Pope Gregory wrote to Duke Béla on 25 October 1234, reminding him of his previous offer to build a church in Cumania and encouraging him to grant estates to the bishop of Cumania.

The pope's next letter, written on 14 November 1234, stated that there were "certain people within the Cuman bishopric named 'Walati'" (Vlachs). The Vlachs did not receive their sacraments from the Catholic bishop, but "from some pseudo-bishops of the Greek rite". According to the pope, the Vlachs persuaded "Hungarians, Saxons and other Catholics" who had settled in Cumania to join the Orthodox church. Gregory IX authorized Bishop Theodoric to consecrate a Catholic bishop for the Vlachs, and asked Duke Béla to help Theodoric impose his authority over the Vlachs. The pope's letter suggests that the Vlachs were a significant group (possibly the majority) among the peoples of Cumania, and they had their own local church hierarchy.

The Mongols again invaded the easternmost regions of the "Cuman steppes", forcing tens of thousands of Cumans to seek refuge in Hungary or Bulgaria around 1240. The Bishopric of Cumania was destroyed during the Mongol invasion of Central Europe in 1241. According to the contemporaneous Roger of Torre Maggiore, Bochetor and "other kings" led the Mongol army to the "land of the bishop of the Cumans" and annihilated the local army. The invaders destroyed the episcopal see and murdered many Dominican friars:

After much hard work, by God's help, a convent was established, and the brothers began to preach confidently among the people. Only God can count the number of people who were converted to the faith of our Lord Jesus Christ day after day. While the brothers' fervour and zeal for the conversion of these pagans was increasing more and more, God's hidden judgment permitted a persecution from the [Mongols]. This not only impeded the preaching of our brothers, but forced many of them to go sooner to the heavenly kingdom. Up to ninety brothers flew to the kingdom of heaven, some by the sword, others by arrows, spears or fire. The mission to these pagans was interrupted while, as a result of the [Mongol] persecution, the Cumans were scattered to different parts of Greece, Bulgaria, Serbia and other nearby regions. Finally most of them came to Hungary, where the king welcomed them.

— Friar Gerard de Frachet: The Lives of the Brethren

=== Aftermath (after 1241) ===
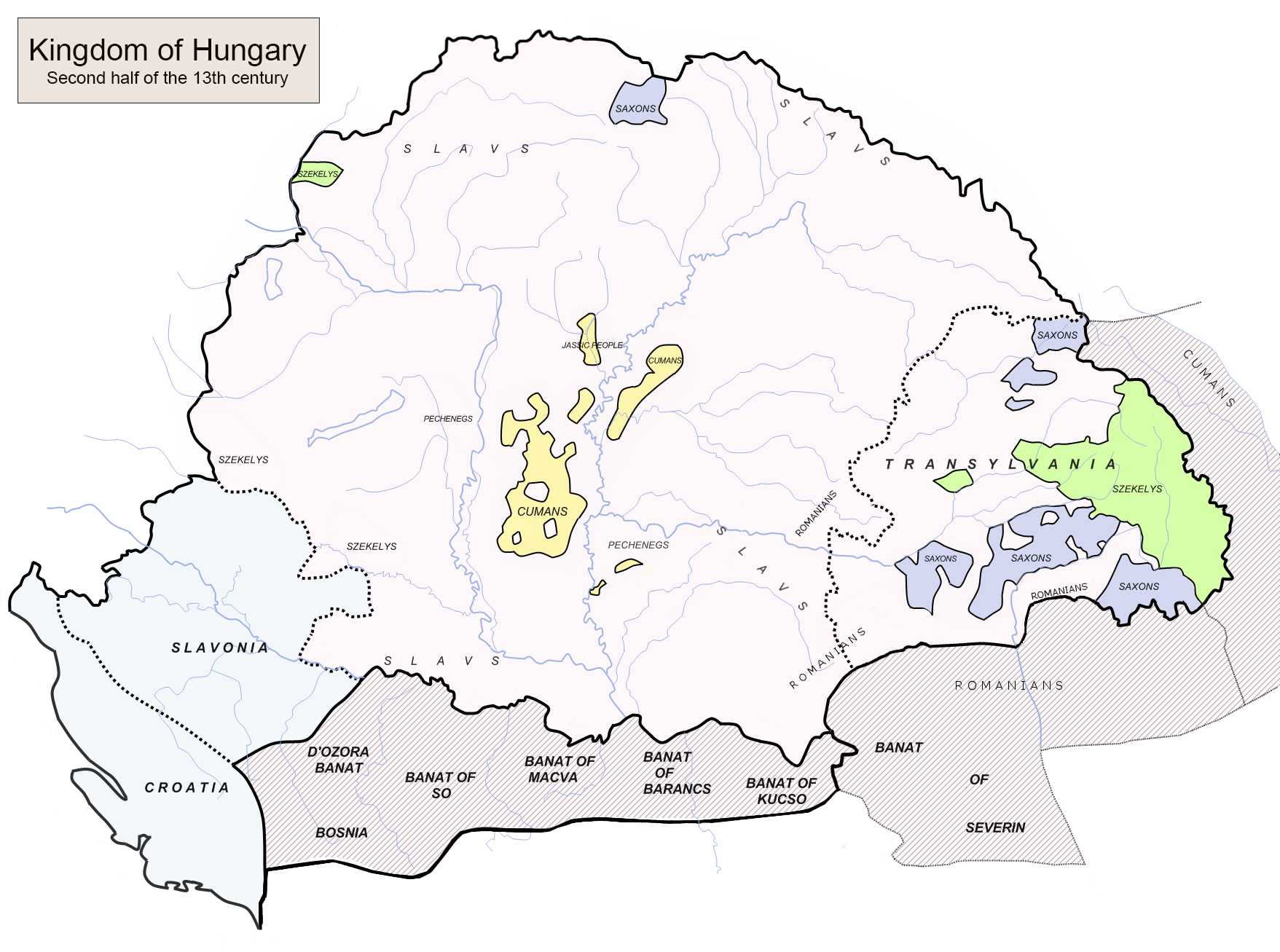
The Kingdom of Hungary in the second half of the 13th century (the grey area east of the Székelys and the Banate of Severin was included in the bishopric of Cumania)

The Mongols conquered the steppes as far as the Lower Danube. They massacred or enslaved many Cumans, but significant Cuman groups survived and preserved their separate identity in the Mongol Empire until the end of the 14th century. The Holy See did not abandon the idea of proselytizing in Cumania after the Mongol invasion, and Pope Innocent IV praised the Dominicans for their successful missions to the Cumans in 1253. However, Pope Nicholas III mentioned in a 7 October 1278 letter that Catholics had disappeared from the Diocese of Cumania because no bishop lived there since the destruction of the episcopal see. The pope urged Philip, Bishop of Fermo (his legate in Hungary) to investigate the situation in the former bishopric.

Franciscan friars played an important role in Catholic missions to the lands east of the Carpathians. The Holy See had authorized the order to administer the sacraments, build churches and grant indulgences in Cumania in 1239, renewing the authorization six years later. Missionaries risked their lives in the lands subject to the Mongols in the first half of the 14th century; "Saracens" murdered Friar Pietro da Unghera near Transylvania in 1314, and Friars Blasius and Marcus were martyred in Siret in 1340.

Pope John XXII considered restoring the bishopric in 1332. In a letter addressed to Csanád Telegdi, the Archbishop of Esztergom, he wrote that "the powerful of those lands" had seized the property of the Diocese of Cumania. Hoping to receive royal support for his plan, the pope decided to make the Franciscan Vitus de Monteferreo (Charles I of Hungary's chaplain) bishop of Milkovia. Although the pope confirmed Vitus's ordination two years later, no evidence exists that the bishop ever visited his diocese. Other bishops were ordained to the see of Milkovia during the next century, but their attempts to regain the properties of the Diocese of Cumania were unsuccessful.

== Territory and see ==
The borders of the Diocese of Cumania cannot be exactly determined. Roger of Torre Maggiore wrote that the Mongols crossed the Siret River before entering the Diocese of Cumania, which indicates that the river was the diocese's eastern border. A 1235 list of the Premonstratensians' houses in Hungary noted that "Corona" (now Brașov in Romania) was in the Cumanian diocese, suggesting that it included southeastern Transylvania. According to historian Victor Spinei, "Southeastern Transylvania was included within the bishopric most likely to secure a constant source of revenue from the collection of tithes for the emerging ecclesiastical structure during the first years after the conversion of the Cumans". Spinei wrote that the Trotuș River must have formed the diocese's northeastern border, and the Buzău River its southeastern frontier.

The location of the episcopal see is the subject of scholarly debate. In his 1278 letter, Pope Nicholas III wrote that the civitas de Mylco (on the Milcov River) was the seat of the Cumanian bishop. Nicolae Iorga identified civitas de Mylco with Odobești; Constantin C. Giurescu with Reghiu and then with Odobești, and Carol Auner with the Crăciuna Citadel at Câmpineanca. According to archaeologists Adrian Andrei Rusu and Anton Paragină, the see of the bishopric was in Focșani or Vârteșcoiu (where small 13th-century forts were excavated). Two Cuman chieftains were buried "in the chapel of the Blessed Virgin", according to The Lives of the Brethren, indicating that at least one chapel was built in the see of the bishopric. The 1278 letter of Pope Nicholas also referred to the cathedral which had been destroyed by the Mongols. The Dominican Theodoric served as bishop under Robert, Archbishop of Esztergom from 1228 to 1234 or later; papal documents note an unnamed bishop of Cumania in 1235 and 1238.

== Sources ==
=== Primary sources ===
- Anna Comnena: The Alexiad (Translated by E. R. A. Sewter) (1969). Penguin Books. ISBN 978-0-14-044958-7.
- Deeds of John and Manuel Comnenus by John Kinnamos (Translated by Charles M. Brand) (1976). Columbia University Press. ISBN 0-231-04080-6.
- "Master Roger's Epistle to the Sorrowful Lament upon the Destruction of the Kingdom of Hungary by the Tatars" (Translated and Annotated by János M. Bak and Martyn Rady) (2010). In Rady, Martyn; Veszprémy, László; Bak, János M. (2010); Anonymus and Master Roger; CEU Press; ISBN 978-963-9776-95-1.
- O City of Byzantium, Annals of Niketas Choniatēs (Translated by Harry J. Magoulias) (1984). Wayne State University Press. ISBN 978-0-8143-1764-8.
- The Deeds of Frederick Barbarossa by Otto of Freising and his Continuator, Rahewin (Translated and annotated with an introduction by Charles Christopher Mierow with the collaboration of Richard Emery) (2004). Columbia University Press. ISBN 0-231-13419-3.

=== Secondary sources ===
- Curta, Florin (2006). Southeastern Europe in the Middle Ages, 500–1250. Cambridge University Press. ISBN 978-0-521-89452-4.
- Dobre, Claudia Florentina (2009). Mendicants in Moldavia: Mission in an Orthodox Land. Aurel Verlag und Handel Gmbh. ISBN 978-3-938759-12-7.
- Engel, Pál (2001). The Realm of St Stephen: A History of Medieval Hungary, 895–1526. I.B. Tauris Publishers. ISBN 1-86064-061-3.
- Kristó, Gyula (2003). Early Transylvania (895–1324). Lucidus Kiadó. ISBN 963-9465-12-7.
- Makkai, László (1994). "The Emergence of the Estates (1172–1526)". In Köpeczi, Béla; Barta, Gábor; Bóna, István; Makkai, László; Szász, Zoltán; Borus, Judit (eds.). History of Transylvania. Akadémiai Kiadó. pp. 178–243. ISBN 963-05-6703-2.
- Pop, Ioan-Aurel (2013). "De manibus Valachorum scismaticorum...": Romanians and Power in the Mediaeval Kingdom of Hungary: The Thirteenth and Fourteenth Centuries. Peter Lang Edition. ISBN 978-3-631-64866-7.
- Rădvan, Laurenţiu (2010). At Europe's Borders: Medieval Towns in the Romanian Principalities. BRILL. ISBN 978-90-04-18010-9.
- Sălăgean, Tudor (2005). "Romanian Society in the Early Middle Ages (9th–14th Centuries AD)". In Pop, Ioan-Aurel; Bolovan, Ioan (eds.). History of Romania: Compendium. Romanian Cultural Institute (Center for Transylvanian Studies). pp. 133–207. ISBN 978-973-7784-12-4.
- Spinei, Victor (1986). Moldavia in the 11th–14th Centuries. Editura Academiei Republicii Socialiste Româna.
- Spinei, Victor (2008). "The Cuman bishopric—Genesis and evolution". In Curta, Florin; Kovalev, Roman (eds.). The Other Europe in the Middle Ages: Avars, Bulgars, Khazars, and Cumans. Brill. pp. 413–456. ISBN 978-90-04-16389-8.
- Spinei, Victor (2009). The Romanians and the Turkic Nomads North of the Danube Delta from the Tenth to the Mid-Thirteenth century. BRILL. ISBN 978-90-04-17536-5.
- Zsoldos, Attila (2011). Magyarország világi archontológiája, 1000–1301 [Secular Archontology of Hungary, 1000–1301]. História, MTA Történettudományi Intézete. ISBN 978-963-9627-38-3.
