= Bortsov =

Bortsov (masculine, Russian: Борцов) or Bortsova (feminine, Russian: Борцова) is a Russian surname. Notable people with the surname include:

- Nikolay Bortsov (1945–2023), Russian politician
- Viktor Bortsov (1934–2008), Russian Soviet actor
- Vladimir Bortsov (born 1974), Kazakhstani cross-country skier

== See also ==
- Bortz (surname)
