= Chronicon Austriacum =

The conventional title Chronicon Austriacum has been used for several medieval chronicles:

- Chronicon Austriacum anonymi (973–1327)
- Breve chronicon Austriacum (1018–1279)
- Chronicon Vatzonis (12th–13th centuries), also called the Chronicon Austriacum
- Annales Zwetlenses (12th–14th centuries), also called the Zwetlensis monachi chronicon Austriacum
- Breve chronicon Austriacum Mellicense ad annum 1157
- Chronicon rhythmicum Austriacum (c. 1270)
- Breve chronicon Austriacum (1402–1443)
- Chronicon Austriae (1463), also called the Chronicon Austriacum
- Breve chronicon Austriacum Mellicense ad annum 1464
- Chronicon Austriacarum (1454–1467), also called the Anonymi Chronicon Austriacum
- Österreichische Chronik (1488), also called the Chronicon Austriacum
