= Frumușeni Mosaics =

Set of millennium-old mosaics

The Frumușeni Mosaics are a set of millennium-old mosaics discovered in Romania at "Fântâna Turcului" (Turk's Well), close to the locality of Frumușeni, on the left bank of the river Mureș, near the city of Arad. The area of the discovery corresponds with the former Bizere Monastery of the 11th-16th centuries (see Details).

== Discovery ==
The archaeological excavations from the Frumușeni site, Fântânele, Arad County, were done by the research team composed of dr. Adrian Andrei Rusu (Institute of Archaeology and Art History in Cluj-Napoca), drd. George Pascu Hurezan (Arad County Museum Complex), dr. Peter Hugel (Arad County Museum Complex) and drd. Ileana Burnichioiu ("1 Decembrie 1918" University in Alba Iulia). The mosaic was discovered in August 2003.

Further excavations also identified a complex of monumental buildings (a 23m x 8m two-level palace/port, two churches, a tower with a well, palisades, ditches and other construction components—portal, frieze, colons, mouldings, capitals, window enclosures, arches—local and imported ceramics, sculpted pieces, coins, book binders, adornments, fragments of apparel pieces, bronze vessels, knives, crossbow bolts, spurs, glass panes, plates, dishes and pots, candles. The area was the witness of the discovery of a well, shedding light on the reason for its name. Also discovered was a cemetery, consisting of three hundred graves.

Authorities plan to raise a museum pavilion over the site. This project is also supported by the Austrian Institute of Archeology, as well as the University of Vienna. The land on which the discovery was made, was ceded to the new museum by the local authorities.

== Details ==
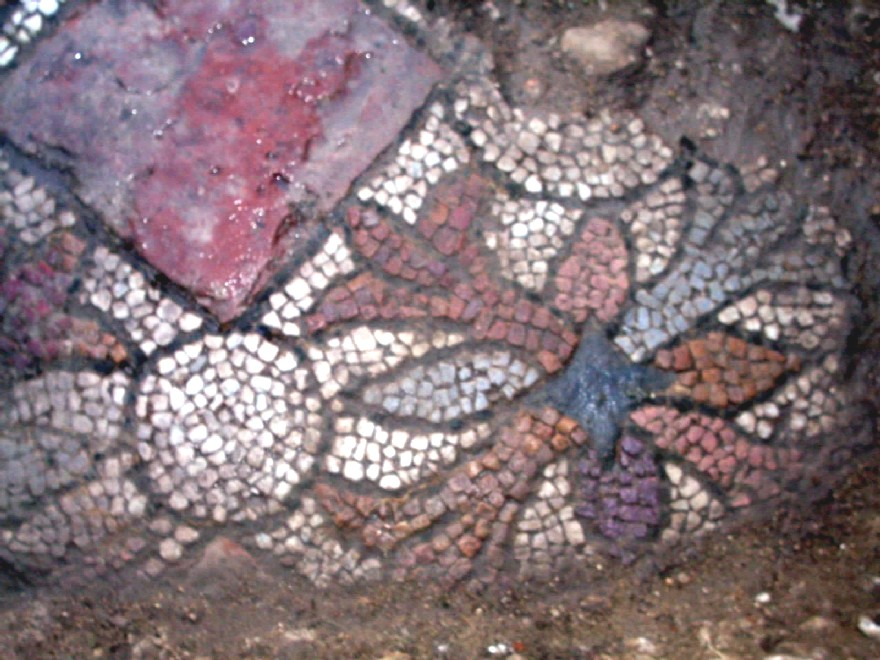
Fragment of the mosaic

The mosaics were discovered inside the ruins of a former Roman Catholic monastery, the Bizere Monastery, which functioned between the 12th and 16th century. During this period the area belonged to the Kingdom of Hungary. The mosaic is believed to have constituted the floor of the church.

The speculations concerning the Eastern Orthodox origin of the mosaics cannot be fully proved, since the style and the possible dating of the finds can also have very strong Italian connections. The archaeological evidence in itself insufficient to decide whether the monastery was of western or eastern rite. Even the possible Byzantine origin of the mosaics does not support convincingly the Orthodox identification of the place, because in one hand of the very strong relationship between the Kingdom of Hungary (see Béla III's Byzantine connections), and on the other hand the ground plan and the architectural appearance of the building-complex rather represents a classical western liturgical space.

The surface is constituted by several polychrome mosaics, grouped into three 4.5m by 1.3m panels, beautifully crafted, depicting real or fantastic animal, floral, solar and geometric representations. The bestiary, containing a wolf-headed centaur, a half dog-half boar, a winged he-goat, a bear, a rabbit, a predator bird catching a fish, seems to illustrate the allegorical battle between good and evil. The mosaics also contain several crosses with equal arms, framed by squares, and superposed by a flower, suggesting the path to salvation.

The discovery of the Orthodox church only confirms an older hypothesis of Romanian historiography, which suggests that Catholic orders (Cistercians, Benedictines), had taken over from the Orthodox Christians a series of monasteries, one of which is the Bistra Monastery (toponym transformed into Bizere). The Catholic monastery ended its existence in 1551, after an Ottoman invasion.

== See also ==
- Romania in the Middle Ages
- History of Christianity in Romania
