= Humbert of Romans =

French Dominican friar (died 1277)

The Most Reverend Humbert of Romans OP
- Master of the Order of Preachers
- Church: Catholic Church
- In office: 1254–1263
- Predecessor: Raymond of Penyafort
- Successor: John of Vercelli

Personal details
- Born: c. 1190-1200 Romans-sur-Isère, France
- Died: 14 July 1277 (aged 76–87) Valence, Drôme, France
- Denomination: Catholic
- Occupation: Priest, academic, theologian

Humbert of Romans, OP (c. 1190-1200, Romans-sur-Isère – 14 July 1277, Valence, Drôme, France) was a French Dominican friar who served as the fifth Master General of the Order of Preachers from 1254 to 1263.

== Early career ==
Humbert was born at Romans-sur-Isère around 1194. In 1215, he attended the University of Paris where he studied both Arts and then canon law. A man of deep piety, subsequently, although he had thought about joining the Carthusians (whom his brother had joined), he entered the Dominican Order on 30 November 1224. After his profession, he was appointed lector of theology at the Dominican priory in Lyon during 1226 and, by 1237, he had become prior of that monastery. In 1240 he was appointed as the Prior Provincial of Tuscany. His presence in Italy led to support for his candidacy in the papal conclave of 1241 (although the Orsini and other noble Romans families seem to have opposed his election).

Humbert returned to France in 1244 as Prior Provincial of the country, replacing Hugh of Saint-Cher, who had been made a cardinal, the first from their Order. During his time as Provincial in his native land, Humbert was charged with producing a lectionary for use by the whole Order.

== Master General ==
Humbert was elected as Master General of the Dominican Order in 1254. His first achievement was the re-organization (and consequent standardization) of the Order's liturgy. A new edition of the Order's Constitutions was prepared, and measures were taken to improve discipline in the Order's houses. He issued new Constitutions for all nuns associated with the Dominican Order, based on those he himself had drawn up while serving as Provincial of France. He instituted the formal collection of information of two of the Order's members, Dominic, the founder, and the martyred Peter of Verona, with the intention of seeking their canonization. As a result of this search for information, Friar Gerald de Frachet produced his Vitae fratrum (Lives of the Brothers).

Humbert was a great lover of languages, and encouraged linguistic studies among the Dominicans, primarily Arabic, because of the missionary work friars were pursuing amongst those led astray or forced to convert by Muslims in the Middle East.

In 1255, he was called to adjudicate a dispute on the Constitutions of the Carthusian monks. In 1256, he became the godfather of one of the children of King Louis IX of France; and, in 1258, the same king asked for his advice regarding the settlement of a dispute between various noble families. Humbert further encouraged the missionary activities of the friars, and schools to teach Oriental languages were established in Spain.

In governing, he demonstrated both indulgence and severity when either was required, and he combined a broad outlook with a genius for detail. Under his rule, the Order flourished in Italy, Germany, Spain, France, and England. Humbert sent missionaries to the Greeks, Hungarians, Saracens, Armenians, Syrians, Ethiopians, and Tartars. He regulated the liturgy of the Divine Office, determined the suffrages for the dead, commanded the history of the Order be recorded, and even issued minute decrees concerning the election of superiors, the reading of the Constitutions at meals, the transfer of friars from one house to another and other pertinent regulations.

Opposition to the presence of both Dominicans and Franciscans at the University of Paris during the mid-1250s led to his issuing a joint encyclical with the Franciscan Minister General, urging that the two Orders - often in bitter dispute - should work together for their survival and the maintenance of their university chairs.

Humbert resigned his position as Master of the Order in 1263 at the General Chapter held in London, probably on account of his failing health.

== Writings ==
Humbert's literary production was geared mainly to the demands of his Order. He composed a Letter on Regular Observance (Epistola de regularis observantia disciplinae); a commentary on the Rule of Saint Augustine (the Rule which had been adopted by the Dominicans in 1220, though in a modified form); and a treatise on the responsibilities of various roles within the order (Instructiones de officiis ordinis fratrum Praedicatorum). He also composed a number of materials to help train Dominican preachers, including a collection of exempla, or sermon illustrations, entitled De dono timoris; a treatise On Preaching (De eruditione praedicatorum), instructing preachers with moral and practical advice; and a series of 'sketches' for use in composing sermons. One of these series contained outlines for 100 ad status sermons, detailing what should be preached to a great variety of different audiences, from hermits to cathedral canons, and from noblemen to maidservants. Another series outlined 100 sermons for use on various occasions, both for religious occasions such as synods and ecclesiastical councils, and for secular occasions such as at tournaments or before a royal parliament.

Humbert also composed the Opus tripartitum, one of a number of texts by leading intellectuals commissioned by Gregory X to be presented at the Second Council of Lyon in 1274. This document defended church reform, discussed the relationship of the Church to Arabs, analyzed the causes and effects of the East–West Schism, proposed ways to go about the re-establishment of Christian unity between the two wings of Christianity and promoted the mission to the heathens. It also touched on the recovery of the Holy Land and defended it against criticism of crusading.

== External sources ==
- Humbert of Romans, Treatise on Preaching, trans. Dominican Students Province of St. Joseph, ed. Walter M. Conlon (London, 1955).
- Humbert of Romans, Opera de vita regulari, ed. J. J. Berthier, 2 vols. (Rome, 1888). (Volume 1, Volume 2)
- Edward Tracy Brett, Humbert of Romans: His Life and Views of Thirteenth-Century Society (Toronto, 1984).

Catholic Church titles
Preceded by John of Wildeshausen	Master General of the Dominican Order; 1254–1263	Succeeded by John of Vercelli
