= Bortz =

Bortz or Börtz is a surname. Notable people include:

- Bortz (chieftain), 13th-century Cuman chieftain
- Analia Bortz (born 1967), Argentine medical doctor and rabbi
- Chris Bortz (born 1973), American politician
- Cindy Bortz, American figure skater
- Daniel Börtz (born 1943), Swedish composer
- Mark Bortz (born 1961), American football player
- Rudolf Bortz (born 1938), German sports shooter
- Walter Bortz II (1930–2023), American researcher and medical doctor
- Walter M. Bortz III (1944–2023), American university president
