= Bortz (chieftain) =

Bortz, also Boricius (Hungarian: Borc), was a Cuman chieftain in the 13th century. He voluntarily converted to Christianity in 1227, acknowledging the suzerainty of the Kingdom of Hungary. Within a year, the Roman Catholic Diocese of Cumania was established in Bortz's land along the river Siret in present-day Romania.

== Name ==
His name appears in various forms in contemporary records. A papal letter from 1227 refers to him as Bortz, in addition to certain documents of the Dominican Order, while the chronicle of Emo of Friesland calls him Boricius. It is widely regarded that he is identical with that Begovars, who led the Cumans that helped Duke Béla with his attack on the Kingdom of Galicia–Volhynia in 1229 or 1230, according to the Galician–Volhynian Chronicle. The Commentariolum de provinciae Hungariae originibus (1259) and subsequent narratives of the Dominicans in Hungary distinguishes two baptized Cuman chiefs from that time: the first prince is called as Brut, Brutus, Bruch, Bauch, Barc or Biutus, while the name of the second chieftain is recorded as Bembroch, Bernborch, Breroth, Bibrech or Membrok. According to Hungarian historian György Györffy, the second leader (Membrok) was the son of Bortz. Romanian historian Ioan Ferenț considered Bortz and Membrok were the same person. Hungarian historian Maria Magdolna Tatár also referred the two names to a single person.

The name Bortz is can be identified with the Turkic word "bars", which means "panther" or "leopard" (György Györffy), or "burč", which was used in the meaning of "pepper", or "borč" (but least probably), an equivalent to "debt" (Vladimir Drimba). According to Szilvia Kovács, this correlation is supported by the Old East Slavic version of his name (Begovars), as the first element of the name can be connected with Turkic "bey" of "beg".

== Life ==
It is plausible his tribe – Burčoğli (Old East Slavic: Burchebichi, Hungarian: Borcsol) – lived in the territory between the rivers Dnieper and Oril in present-day Ukraine. According to the chronicle of Emo of Friesland, Bortz (Boricius) was "fourth in rank among the major Cuman leaders". According to Kovács, following the Battle of the Kalka River (1223), the hierarchy within the Cuman people was the following: Bastyj functioned as the supreme chieftain of the Cumans, Köten and Bačman took the second or third place, while Bortz was fourth among them. After the defeat, Bortz and his people fled westbound, and his group (also known as "Danubian Cumans") settled down in the area between Lower Danube and the southeastern Carpathians. His residence was Karabuna, later known as Tatarbunary (present-day in Ukraine), where other Cuman tribes were already settled in the previous decades.

The way for the Cumans' conversion was opened after their defeat at the Kalka River. Bortz and other Cumans sought assistance from Hungary in order to prevent a possible next Mongol invasion. King Andrew II of Hungary made his oldest son, Béla, Duke of Transylvania in 1226. Duke Béla, who wanted to expand his authority over the neighboring Cuman tribes, supported the Dominican friars' missionary activities. The nearly-contemporaneous Alberic of Trois-Fontaines wrote that a Cuman chieftain's son (possibly Membrok) visited Robert, Archbishop of Esztergom in Hungary in 1227, asking the prelate to baptize him and his 12 retainers. Membrok also reported that his father and his 2,000 subjects were also willing to come to Transylvania to be baptized. Robert accepted the offer and went to Transylvania with three Hungarian prelates: Bartholomew le Gros, Bishop of Pécs; Bartholomew, Bishop of Veszprém, and Raynald of Belleville, Bishop of Transylvania. According to the chronicle of Emo, they met the Cuman chieftain Bortz and baptized him and his retainers in the presence of Duke Béla. Bortz also submitted himself and his people to the Hungarian monarch; a Dominican account claims that King Andrew II became the godfather of Membrok. It is possible that Robert and his three suffragans crossed the border across the Carpathian Mountains and the baptisms took place in Cumania. The number of Cumans baptised with their chief varies from source to source. Emo specified a "large number", Alberic noted 15,000, and the Austrian chronicles Vatzonis, Leobiense and Claustroneuburgense described 10,000 converts. In exchange for Bortz's oath of fealty, Andrew II granted privileges of freedom to the Cumans and their possession of land in Transylvania. The conversion of thousands of Cumans was followed by the creation of the Catholic bishopric of Cumania. According to Alberic, Archbishop Robert consecrated the Dominican friar Theodoric bishop of the new diocese in 1228. The territory of the bishopric overlapped Bortz's domain along the tributary Milcov.

Béla's youngest brother, Andrew, Prince of Halych, was expelled from his principality in the spring of 1229 or 1230. Béla decided to help him to regain his throne. The duke launched military campaign against Daniel of Galicia, receiving support from Bortz and his tribe. Béla crossed the Carpathian Mountains and laid siege to Halych together with his Cuman allies in 1229 or 1230. Daniel was supported by other Cumans too, under the leadership of Köten. It is possible, Bortz and his army joined Béla's forces from outside the mountains. The Hungarian expedition ended in failure, Béla could not seize Halych and withdrew his troops. A papal diploma narrates that Bortz and his converted Cumans were under constant threat from three sides, the Sultanate of Rum, the neighboring pagan Cumans and Brodnici, and Orthodox Vlachs (including Romanians) and Bulgarians. Because of their danger, Pope Gregory IX declared that he exempted "Cumania" (i.e. Bortz's land) from the authority of king of Hungary on 1 October 1229, subjecting them directly to the tutelage of the Holy See. Bortz died "as a good Christian" prior to the first Mongol invasion of Hungary in 1241, before the episcopal church was built in 1234, according to Dominican sources. He was buried in the Virgin Mary chapel built by the Dominicans in Buda.

== Sources ==
- Berend, Nora (2001). At the Gate of Christendom: Jews, Muslims and "Pagans" in Medieval Hungary, c. 1000–c.1300. Cambridge University Press. ISBN 978-0-521-02720-5.
- Kovács, Szilvia (2005). "Bortz, a Cuman chief in the 13th century". Acta Orientalia Academiae Scientiarum Hungaricae (in Hungarian). 58 (3). Hungarian Academy of Sciences: 255–266. ISSN 0001-6446.
- Spinei, Victor (2008). "The Cuman bishopric—Genesis and evolution". In Curta, Florin; Kovalev, Roman (eds.). The Other Europe in the Middle Ages: Avars, Bulgars, Khazars, and Cumans. Brill. pp. 413–456. ISBN 978-90-04-16389-8.
- Tatár, Maria Magdolna (2018). "Bortz and Membrok, etymology of two Cuman names from the 13th century". In Apatóczky, Ákos Bertalan (ed.). Ideas behind symbols – languages behind scripts. Proceedings of the 60th Meeting of the Permanent International Altaistic Conference (PIAC) August 27 – September 1, 2017 Székesfehérvár, Hungary. University of Szeged. pp. 107–115. ISBN 978-963-306-663-8.
