= Battle of the Maritsa river (1284) =

- Part of the Mongol invasion of Europe
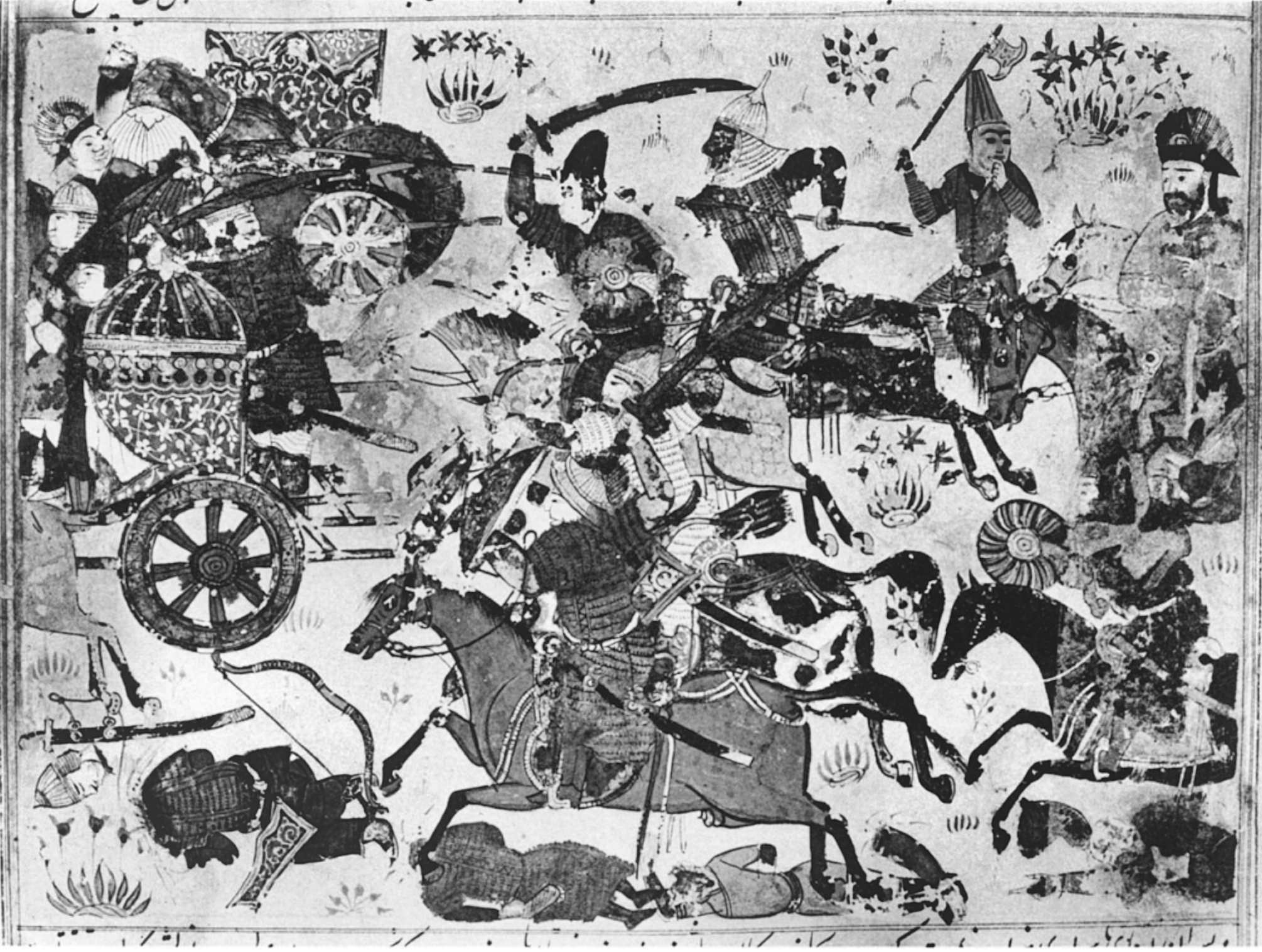
- 14th century Jami' al-tawarikh depiction of Mongol cavalry in battle during the era of Nogai Khan (c. 1260 - 1300)
Date	1284
Location	Maritsa river (present-day Western Thrace, Greece)
Result	Byzantine victory

Belligerents
Golden Horde	Byzantine Empire

Commanders and leaders
Unknown	Oumbertopoulos

Strength
100,000 (according to George Pachymeres) (Note: Modern historians consider this figure to be inflated, and Angeliki E. Laiou reasoned that the strength of the Mongol army was closer to 10,000 cavalry.)	Fewer than the Mongols

Casualties and losses
Most of the army	Unknown

The Battle of the Maritsa river in 1284 was fought between an invading Mongol host from the Golden Horde and a Byzantine army near the Maritsa River. When the Mongols crossed into Byzantine Thrace, they were attacked by a regional Byzantine force under the command of Kouropalates Oumbertopoulos. Although numerically inferior, the Byzantines inflicted a crushing defeat on the Mongols, which forced the remnants of their army to withdraw. Oumbertopoulos was richly rewarded by Emperor Andronikos II for this military accomplishment.

== Background ==
During the early years of Emperor Michael VIII Palaiologos, Byzantine Thrace faced its first attack by the Golden Horde, which succeeded in forcing the Byzantines to release Sultan Kaykaus II of Rum from captivity. For the remainder of his reign, Michael VIII pursued friendly relations wiith the Golden Horde and ultimately succeeded in striking an alliance, by marrying his illegitimate daughter Euphrosyne to Nogai Khan. These efforts bore fruit, as Nogai Khan aided the Byzantines in the war against Ivaylo of Bulgaria. However, following the death of Michael VIII, relations between the Golden Horde and the Byzantines, under Andronikos II, began to deteriorate again.

The Haemus and Anatolia in 1265

In 1284, a large Mongol army drawn from the domains and subjects of the Golden Horde (given the antiquarian name "Scythian" in the Greek text of George Pachymeres), supposedly consisting of 100,000 horsemen, amassed in the territories north of the Danube, with the intention to conduct a plundering expedition into territories south of the river. The Mongols devastated and pillaged a wide area within the domains of the Second Bulgarian Empire, until they encamped near the Haemus mountains. It may have been during this campaign that the region of Saqchi (modern Isaccea, Dobruja) came under the suzerainty of the Golden Horde. Encouraged by the initial success of their campaign, the Mongols decided to carry their invasion further south into the Byzantine regions of Macedonia and Thrace, in search of more plunder.

== Battle ==
Chain mail armour and helmet, an example of some types of equipment used by Mongol warriors in Europe

By the time the Mongols began their advance into Byzantine territory, the strategos of Mesembria and its surrounding territories, Kouropalates Oumbertopoulos, had become aware of their movements. Oumbertopoulos, whom Pachymeres emphasises as a disciplined and faithful man, did not wait for support or orders from the emperor in Constantinople, but acted on his own initiative. The strategos mustered the troops stationed in the areas under his command and marched out to meet the invaders, eventually encountering them near the Maritsa river. Although his men were heavily outnumbered by the enemy host, Oumbertopoulos was undeterred and conducted a rapid assault against the Mongols. In the ensuing battle, the Byzantines managed to shatter the Mongol lines and destroy most of their army. Part of the Mongol force was killed by Byzantine soldiers in the combat, while others drowned as they attempted to flee across the Maritsa during the rout. A few Mongols managed to swim across the river and, unfamiliar with the region, had to flee back north through difficult and roadless terrain.

== Aftermath ==
When Andronikos II learned of the brilliant and unexpected Byzantine victory over the Mongols, he made a public prayer in gratitude to God, before rewarding his general Oumbertopoulos with a number of gifts, such as garments, gold and horses, and also bestowed upon him the rank of grand papias. Despite the Mongol defeat in 1284, the Byzantines remained cautious of the power of the Golden Horde. Over the following decades Andronikos II attempted to renew peaceful relations with the Horde, in order to prevent further attacks into Thrace, continuing the policy of his father by marrying princesses to Toqta (following his victory over Nogai in c. 1299), and to his successor Özbeg Khan. Nevertheless, from 1320 onwards, Byzantine Thrace suffered a further series of attacks from the Golden Horde, culminating in a major incursion in 1324.

== Bibliography ==
- Niebuhr, Barthold Georg (1835). Corpus scriptorum historiae byzantinae: Georgii Pachymeris de Michaele et Andronico Palaeologis libri tredecim. Vol. 2. Bonnae: Impensis Ed. Weberi.
- Jackson, Peter (2014) [2005]. The Mongols and the West, 1221-1410. London and New York: Routledge. ISBN 9781317878995.
- Laiou, Angeliki E. (1972). Constantinople and the Latins: The Foreign Policy of Andronicus II, 1282–1328. Harvard University Press. ISBN 0674-16535-7.
- Kyriakidis, Savvas (2011). Warfare in Late Byzantium, 1204–1453. Brill. pp. 190–191.
- Bosch, Ursula Victoria (1965), Kaiser Andronikos III. Palaiologos. Versuch einer Darstellung der byzantinischen Geschichte in den Jahren 1321–1341 (in German), Adolf M. Hakkert
