= Baldwin of Hainaut =

13th-century knight and diplomat

Baldwin of Hainaut (French: Baudouin de Hainaut, Latin: Balduinus de Hannonia or Haynaco) was a knight and diplomat of the Latin Empire of Constantinople. He undertook important missions to the Cumans (1240) and the Mongols (1251–52).

Baldwin was originally from the County of Hainaut. The historian Charles Verlinden argues that he was the same person as Baldwin of Avesnes.

According to Aubrey of Trois Fontaines, Baldwin married a daughter of the Cuman king Saronius (Note: Greek Syrgianis, perhaps from Cuman Sičgan.) in 1241. Another daughter of Saronius married the nobleman William of Merry, while a daughter of Saronius' co-regent Jonas married Narjot III de Toucy. The daughters of Saronius were baptized Christians. Baldwin had probably been sent on a diplomatic mission to the Cumans in 1240.

In 1251–52, Baldwin was sent on a diplomatic mission to the Mongol Empire. Through his Cuman wife he may have acquired knowledge of Cuman, a Turkic language, which would have been useful on any voyage into Mongol territory. He visited the court of Sartaq at Sarai and then the imperial court of Möngke Khan at Karakorum. Historians do not agree on the purpose of this mission. Jean Richard argues that the Latin Empire had been forced to make submission to the Mongols and pay tribute following the Mongol invasion in 1242. Baldwin of Hainaut was sent to renew submission to the Great Khan Güyük, elected in 1246. Güyük died and was succeeded by Möngke before Baldwin arrived in Karakorum. Aleksandar Uzelac, on the other hand, argues that Baldwin was probably merely seeking an alliance, since William of Rubruck, who went on a mission to Mongolia in 1253, does not mention the Latin Empire in his list of tributaries to the Mongols.

William of Rubruck, before setting out on his mission, stopped in Constantinople to confer with Baldwin. In his subsequent report to King Louis IX of France, he says that Baldwin told Sartaq that Louis was the most powerful ruler in the west. Baldwin also told William that "the only surprising thing he had seen" was that the khan was always moving uphill, since the rivers only flowed from east to west. This seems to be a reference to the fact that the rivers west of the Altai Mountains all flow in this direction, as had been noted by Yelü Chucai already in 1229.

Baldwin may be the origin of the rumour that Sartaq was secretly a Christian, since this rumour was reported to Louis IX by Philippe de Toucy shortly after Baldwin's return through Sartaq's lands. Philippe was the son of Narjot III and thus belonged to the same social circle as Baldwin.

== Sources ==
- Giebfried, John (2014). "Crusader Constantinople as a Gateway to the Mongol World". Academia.edu.
- Hamilton, Bernard (2014). "The Latin Empire and Western Contacts with Asia". In Nikolaos G. Chrissis; Mike Carr (eds.). Contact and Conflict in Frankish Greece and the Aegean, 1204–1453: Crusade, Relition and Trade between Latins, Greeks and Turks. Ashgate. pp. 43–62.
- Jackson, Peter; Morgan, David, eds. (1990). The Mission of Friar William of Rubruck: His Journey to the Court of the Great Khan Möngke, 1253–1255. London: Hakluyt Society.
- Madgearu, Alexandru (2016). The Asanids: The Political and Military History of the Second Bulgarian Empire (1185–1280). Leiden: Brill.
- Richard, Jean (1992). "À propos de la mission de Baudouin de Hainaut: l'empire latin de Constantinople et les mongols". Journal des Savants. 1992 (1): 115–21. doi:10.3406/jds.1992.1554.
- Vásáry, István (2005). Cumans and Tatars: Oriental Military in the Pre-Ottoman Balkans, 1185–1365. Cambridge University Press.
