= Câmpineanca =

- Commune
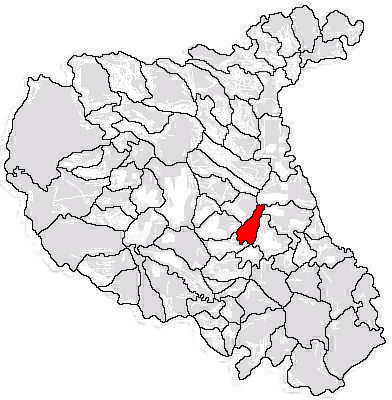
- Location in Vrancea County

- Location in Romania
- Coordinates: 45°42′N 27°8′E
- Country: Romania
- County: Vrancea

Government
  - Mayor (2024–2028): Tudorel Ivan (PSD)
- Area: 19.57 km^{2} (7.56 sq mi)
- Elevation: 78 m (256 ft)
- Population (2021-12-01): 4,595
  - Density: 234.8/km^{2} (608.1/sq mi)
- Time zone: UTC+02:00 (EET)
  - Summer (DST): UTC+03:00 (EEST)
- Postal code: 627055
- Area code: +(40) x37
- Vehicle reg.: VN
- Website: www.campineanca.primarievn.ro

Câmpineanca is a commune located in Vrancea County, Romania. It is composed of three villages: Câmpineanca, Pietroasa, and Vâlcele.

The Crăciuna Citadel excavated at Câmpineanca has been suggested as a candidate for the civitas de Mylco (on the Milcov River), the seat of the bishop of the Diocese of Cumania mentioned in a 1278 papal letter (see Roman Catholic Diocese of Cumania: List of bishops).

Historical population
Year	Pop.	±%
2002	3,160	—
2011	3,501	+10.8%
2021	4,595	+31.2%
Source: Census data
