= John of Vercelli =

Blessed John of Vercelli O.P.
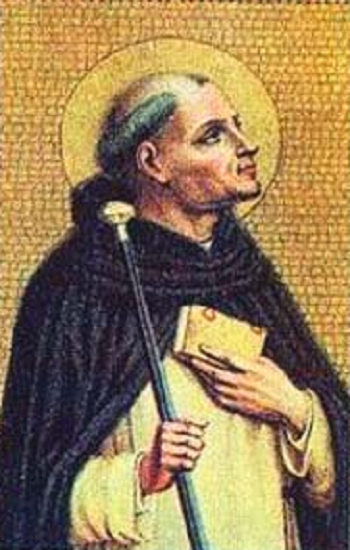

Master General of the Order of Preachers
- Born: c. 1205; Mosso Santa Maria; Biella, Italy
- Died: 30 November 1283 (aged 78); Montpellier, France
- Venerated in: Roman Catholic Church (Dominican Order)
- Beatified: 7 September 1903, Rome by Pope Pius X
- Attributes: Dominican habit Book
- Patronage: Confraternity of the most Holy Names of God and Jesus ('The Holy Name Society')

John of Vercelli (Giovanni da Vercelli) (c. 1205 – 30 November 1283) was the sixth Master General of the Dominican Order (1264-1283).

== Early life and education ==
John was born in 1205 to the Garbella family in Mosso Santa Maria in the Province of Biella, in the Piedmont region of Italy. He did his initial studies in Paris (one could not graduate in the Arts before the age of 21, and only after a minimum of six years of study), and then studied canon law in Paris, Pavia, and Vercelli before he joined the Dominican friars during the 1240s.

The Emperor Frederick II died on December 13, 1250. Pope Innocent IV's exile was over. He left Lyons on April 19, 1251, and arrived in his home town, Genoa, on May 18. From Genoa he began the difficult task of getting back the territories of the Catholic Church lost to the Emperor Frederick, and reconstructing the effective operation of the church hierarchy in northern and central Italy. One of his problems was the rise and flourishing of heresy in the Po Valley. On June 11, 1251, the pope issued instructions from Genoa to Vincentius of Milan and Joannes of Vercelli, to undertake the office of inquisitor, jointly or severally, in Venice and other parts of Lombardy. These were not the only inquisitors appointed. On the same day, and with the same form letter ("Misericors et Miserator"), the pope also appointed Peter of Verona and Vivianus of Bergamo to the same task in the area of Cremona and other cities of Lombardy. No doubt there were others, now unattested. The pope was also prepared to take on Frederick's sons Manfred and Enzo (Ezolino) of Sardinia, as he indicated in a letter to the Dominican Bishop of Treviso and the Prior of Mantua.

Umberto de Romans, the fifth Master General, elected in 1253, held the General Chapter in Buda, Hungary, on May 31, 1254. At the conclusion of the meeting, he appointed John of Vercelli as the Master General's Vicar to Hungary. Later (1255-1257) he was appointed Prior of the Dominican monastery in Bologna.

== Prior of Lombardy ==
In 1257, at the Provincial Chapter for Lombardy held at Novara, he was elected Prior Provincial of Lombardy. At that time the province contained thirty convents of the Order. During his administration three new convents were founded, at Turin, Chieri and Tortona. He served as Prior of Lombardy for seven years. One of the major and continuing problems in his province was the rise and spread of heresy, especially Catharism. The inquisitorial machine was being constructed, as John's own service in Venice a few years earlier indicates. These new inquisitors were directing one question after another to Rome, and were overwhelming the Curia with their concerns. Alexander replied, urging them to act boldly and independently, against any manner or quality of person, but to continue to consult the Holy See in difficult cases. On March 23, 1262, the new pope, Urban IV, sent a mandate to John of Vercelli, authorizing him, in consultation with other discreet members of his Order, to appoint up to eight Dominican friars as inquisitors in the Province of Lombardy and the March of Genoa. He was also authorized to remove inquisitors from office who proved inadequate and to replace them; he could delegate this task to his vicar.

As Prior of Lombardy he was expected to see to the election of a delegate (diffinitor) to the annual General Chapter, and to preside over the Provincial Chapter in Lombardy. In 1258, the General Chapter was held at Toulouse, and the Provincial Chapter at Milan. He took part in the General Chapter at Valenciennes, on April 13, 1259, and held the Provincial Chapter in Bologna. In 1260 the General Chapter was in Strasbourg, and John presided over the provincial General Chapter, which was held at Ferrara. In 1261 the General Chapter was held at Barcelona, and the Provincial Chapter at Milan. In 1262, both meetings took place in Bologna. In 1263 the General Chapter was held in London, and the Provincial Chapter at Venice.

== Master General ==
On June 7, 1264, he was elected as Master General by the General Chapter, held in Paris, under the presidency of Pierre of Tarentaise, the future Pope Innocent V. John held the post of Master General until his death. Known for his tireless energy and his commitment to simplicity, John made personal visits—typically on foot—to almost all the Dominican houses, urging his fellow friars to observe faithfully the Rule and Constitutions of the Order.

In 1267, an event of paramount importance for the Dominican Order took place in Bologna. Already in 1262, under the fifth Master General, the decision had been taken by the General Chapter to provide a more imposing resting place for their founder, Dominic Guzman, than his remains currently enjoyed. John of Vercelli and the members of the Order carried that plan to completion, providing a new shrine for Dominic's body in the apse of their church. Already on March 15, 1267, Pope Clement IV provided a bull, granting a series of indulgences for those visiting the shrine during the week centered on Dominic's feast day. On May 27, 1267, Pope Innocent sent his blessing with his best wishes for an agreeable assembly to the General Congregation which was about to meet. On June 5, 1267, the translation actually took place in a grand ceremony, with John and the delegates assembled for the General Chapter taking part, with the attendance of Archbishop Filippo of Ravenna, Bishop Ottaviano de' Ubaldinis of Bologna, Bishop Tommaso de' Ubaldinis of Imola, and other bishops. Before being placed in the shrine, the head and relics were shown publicly.

John is known to have consulted Thomas Aquinas officially on several occasions on matters pertaining to theology and the teaching of Pierre de Tarantaise.

During his administration, Pope Gregory X entrusted the Dominican Order with the task of trying to establish peace among the warring States of the Italian peninsula. Additionally, John was also given the task of preparing a framework for the Second Council of Lyons, held in 1274 in an attempt to unify the Eastern and Western Churches. In the course of this work, he met and worked with the Minister General of the Friars Minor, Jerome of Ascoli (who would later become Pope Nicholas IV). Both were later sent by the Holy See to negotiate a disagreement with King Philip III of France.

== 1276-1277—Five popes ==
Following the Council, Pope Gregory again looked to the Dominican friars, this time to spread devotion to the Holy Name of Jesus. John took the task to heart, requiring that every Dominican church contain an altar dedicated to the Holy Name. The Society of the Holy Name was formed to combat blasphemy and profanation of this name. Pope Gregory returned to Italy at the end of 1275, but illness ensured that he never reached Rome. He died at Arezzo on January 10, 1276. His new regulations for conclaves "Ubi Periculum", promulgated at the Council of Lyons, were applied for the first time, and a one-day Conclave (January 20–21, 1276), produced a new pope, the Dominican Innocent V. The General Chapter that year met in Pisa in May, and the pope sent his greetings to his brethren, but he died suddenly on June 22, 1276. The Conclave to elect his successor began on July 2, and lasted ten days. Cardinal Ottobono Fieschi was elected on July 11, 1276, and took the name Adrian V. In August, even before his consecration and coronation, he travelled to Viterbo, partially to escape the Roman summer, but also because he wished to meet with the Emperor-elect Rudolf. He died in Viterbo only thirty-seven days after his election, on August 18. At some point during this whirlwind of disasters, John of Vercelli reached the Papal Curia. This was not surprising, since, after a General Chapter, and this one in Pisa, the leaders of the Order of Preachers would have business of all sorts to do with the Curia; the decision to go to Rome was much happier, since one of their own had been elected pope. After his death, they had no alternative but to wait until the new pope was willing and able to do business with them. The death of Adrian V at Viterbo meant that the Dominican leaders were in Viterbo for the third Conclave of 1276. It should have begun on August 29 or 30, but there were disorders in the town, caused, it seems by curial agitators who wanted a quick election. The cardinals were forced to remonstrate with the disorderly mob, and they sent three Dominicans, the Archbishop of Corinth (Petrus de Confluentia), the Master General of the Dominicans (John of Vercelli), and the Procurator General (Ioannes Vereschi), to carry their reproof to the citizens of Viterbo and the unruly Curia. Insults were hurled at the messengers, and stones were thrown. Once order was restored, however, the Conclave began, and in one day, on September 8, produced a new pope, Cardinal Peter Julian of Lisbon, who chose to be called John XXI.

On October 15, Pope John XXI appointed John of Vercellae, as well as Hieronymus, the Minister General of the Franciscans, as Apostolic Legates to go to France to arrange a peace between King Philip and King Alfonso X of Castile. The urgency of their mission was repeated in a letter from the College of Cardinals, written during the Sede Vacante following the death of Pope John XXI on May 16, 1277. Pope Nicholas III repeated the same urgent wish for peace directly to King Philip III of France and King Alfonso X of Castile, with a recommendation for John of Vercellae and Hieronymus Masci. On March 12, 1278, Hieronymus Masci was named a cardinal, but the legates had their orders reinforced by a letter from Nicholas III dated April 4, 1278. Another letter was sent to Masci on April 23, urging him to conclude the embassy as soon as possible, since his services were urgently needed in the Roman Curia.

== Later Years, 1278–1283 ==
Late in his life, on May 15, 1278, John was appointed by Pope Nicholas III to the position of Latin Patriarch of Jerusalem. It was a promotion to the prelacy which he did not welcome and which he wished to decline. After consideration and with considerable reluctance, the pope wrote John a long letter (October 1, 1278) rehearsing the reasons why he should not ask to be released from the episcopal office, addressing him in the letter as Joannes electus Hierosolymitanus, quondam Ordinis Fratrum Praedicatorum Magister (John, Bishop-Elect of Jerusalem and former Master of the Order of Preachers). The Pope was still firm in his refusal to release Bishop-elect John, in letters to King Philip of France and King Alfonso of Castile on November 29, 1278. It was finally after the intervention and persuasion of Nicholas III's nephew, Cardinal Latino Malabranca Orsini, that the pope finally relented and restored John of Vercelli to the office of Master General of his Order.

The General Chapter of the Order of Preachers was held in Montpellier in 1283. The Chapter decided that the next Chapter would be held in Bologna. But John of Vercelli died on 30 November 1283 in the convent of the Dominicans in Montpellier, France.

== General Chapters held by John of Vercelli as Master General ==
John of Vercelli insisted on the rule instituted by Dominic himself that Friars of the Order should travel on foot, never using a horse or a wheeled vehicle. The table below demonstrates the peripatetic nature of John's life as Master General, never staying in one convent for very long, but constantly pursuing his visitations of one province after another, one convent after another. The site of each General Chapter had been decided at the General Chapter the year before (with the proviso that emergency circumstances might allow the Master General to choose another site), and therefore John's itinerary every year would include the goal of reaching the chosen site at the appropriate time each Spring.

Chapter	Year	Location
XLV	1265	Montpellier
XLVI	1266	Trier
XLVII	1267	Bologna
XLVIII	1268	Viterbo
XLIX	1269	Paris
L	1270	Milan
LI	1271	Montpellier
LII	1272	Florence
LIII	1273	Pest
LIV	1274	Lyons
LV	1275	Bologna
LVI	1276	Pisa
LVII	1277	Bordeaux
LVIII	1278	Milan
LIX	1279	Paris
LX	1280	Oxford
LXI	1281	Florence
LXII	1282	Vienne
LXIII	1283	Montpellier

== Patronage ==
John of Vercelli is the patron of the Confraternity of the most Holy Names of God and Jesus ('The Holy Name Society').

== Bibliography ==
- Jacobus Quetif and Jacobus Echard, Scriptores Ordinis Praedicatorum recensiti, notisque historicis et criticis illustrati Tomus primus (Paris 1717), pp. 210–212.
- A. Touron, Histoire des hommes illustres de l' Ordre de Saint Dominique Tome premier (Paris 1743), pp. 418–440.
- Joseph Pie Mothon, Storia del culto prestato nella Chiesa da tempo immemorabile al B. Giovanni da Vercelli (Vercelli 1900).
- Joseph Pie Mothon, Vita del B. Giovanni da Vercelli: sesto Maestro Generale dell'Ordine dei Predicatori (Vercelli: G. Chiais, 1903).
- Daniel Antonin Mortier, Histoire des Maîtres généraux de l' Ordre des Frères Prêcheurs II (Paris 1905).
- G. Donna Doldenico, "B. Giovanni Garbella da Vercelli," Memorie domenicane 69 (1952), pp. 259–265.
- William A. Hinnebusch, The History of the Dominican Order. 2 Vols (NY: Alba House 1973).
- William A. Hinnebusch, "The Dominican Order and Learning," History of the Dominican Order II, pp. 3–18.
- Daniele Penone, I domenicani nei secoli: panorama storico dell'Ordine dei frati predicatori (Bologna: Edizioni Studio Domenicano, 1998) pp. 88–101.
- Luigi Canetti, "Giovanni da Vercelli," Dizionario Biografico degli Italiani Volume 56 (2001).

Preceded by Humbert de Romans	Master General of the Dominican Order; 1264–1283	Succeeded by Munio de Zamora
