= Adrian Andrei Rusu =

Adrian Andrei Rusu (born 8 November 1951) is a researcher in Romanian medieval archaeology. He is also a researcher at the Institute of Archaeology and Art History in Cluj-Napoca.

Born in Mediaș, he attended elementary school and high school in his native city, after which he studied at the University of Cluj, graduating in 1974. From 1974 to 1988 he worked at the Central University Library of Cluj-Napoca and in 1990 he joined the faculty of Babeș-Bolyai University. He is a principal researcher at the Bizere Monastery site in Frumușeni, Arad County.

== Publications ==
- Ctitori și biserici din Țara Hațegului până la 1700 (in Romanian) (first ed.). Satu Mare: Editura Muzeului Sătmărean. 1997. ISBN 973-97339-7-2. OCLC 41272712.
- Ioan de Hunedoara și Românii din vremea sa: studii (in Romanian). Cluj-Napoca: Presa Universitară. 1999. ISBN 973-595-030-8. OCLC 47181605.
- Dicționarul mănăstirilor din Transilvania, Banat, Crișana și Maramureș (in Romanian). Cluj-Napoca: Presa Universitară. 2000. ISBN 973-8095-70-0. OCLC 51608471.

== See also ==
- Frumușeni Mosaics
