= Fântânele, Arad =

Fântânele
- Commune
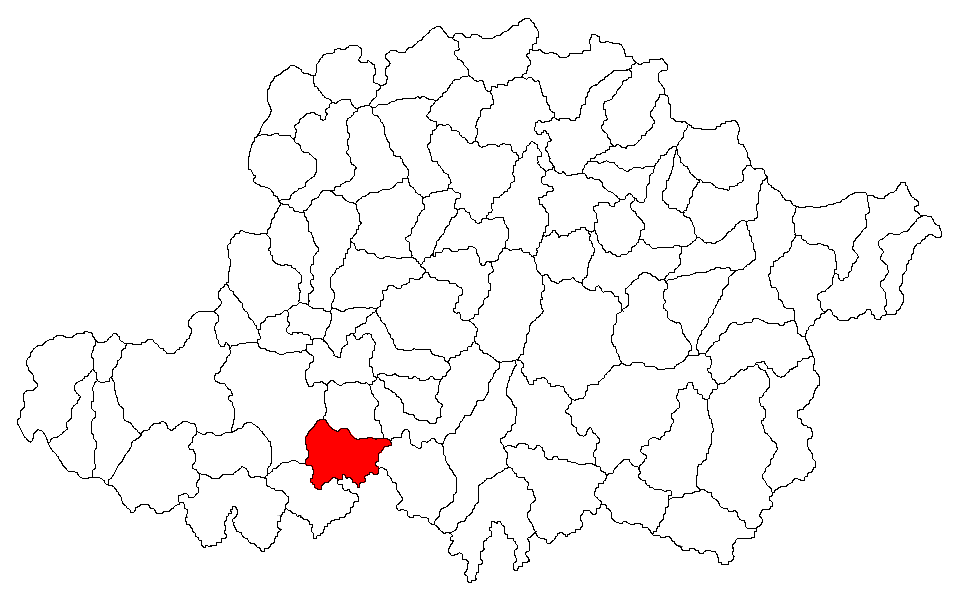
- Location in Arad County

- Location in Romania
- Coordinates: 46.1217°N 21.4031°E
- Country: Romania
- County: Arad
- Population (2021-12-01): 3,273
- Time zone: EET/EEST (UTC+2/+3)
- Vehicle reg.: AR

Fântânele (German: Engelsbrunn; Hungarian: Angyalkút) is a commune in Arad County, Romania. The commune is situated on the Vingăi Plateau, on the left bank of the Mureș River. It is composed of two villages: Fântânele (situated 10 km from Arad) and Tisa Nouă (Wiesenheid; Réthát). It also included Aluniș and Frumușeni villages until 2004, when they were split off.

== Population ==
According to the 2002 census, the population of the commune is 5692 (4975 Romanians, 378 Hungarians, 159 Slovaks, 112 Germans, 31 Romani and 29 others.

== History ==
The first documentary record of Fântânele dates back to 1457, while Tisa Nouă to 1135.

== Economy ==
Although the economy of the commune is prevalent agricultural, grain, technical crops and fodder-plant growing are widespread, vegetable growing and cattle raising are also practised, and the secondary and tertiary economic sectors have also developed recently.

== Tourism ==
The locality is included in the area with cultural value of national interest. In Fântânele village one can visit the Roman Catholic church called "Îngerul Păzitor" (1780) and the Kover-Appel castle dating back to the 19th century with its surrounding park and architectural complex.
