= Mongol invasion of the Latin Empire =

1242 conflict

- Part of the Mongol invasion of Europe
Date	1242
Location	Thrace
Result	Mongol victory

Belligerents
Mongol Empire	Latin Empire

Commanders and leaders
Kadan; Batu Khan	Baldwin II (POW)

In the summer of 1242, a Mongol force invaded the Latin Empire of Constantinople. This force, a detachment of the army under Kadan then devastating Bulgaria, entered the empire from the north. It was met by the Emperor Baldwin II, who was victorious in a first encounter but was subsequently defeated.

The encounters probably took place in Thrace, but little can be said about them owing to the paucity of sources. Subsequent relations between Baldwin and the Mongol khans have been taken as evidence by some that Baldwin was captured and forced to make submission to the Mongols and pay tribute. Together with the major Mongol invasion of Anatolia the following year (1243), the Mongol defeat of Baldwin precipitated a power shift in the Aegean world.

== Sources ==
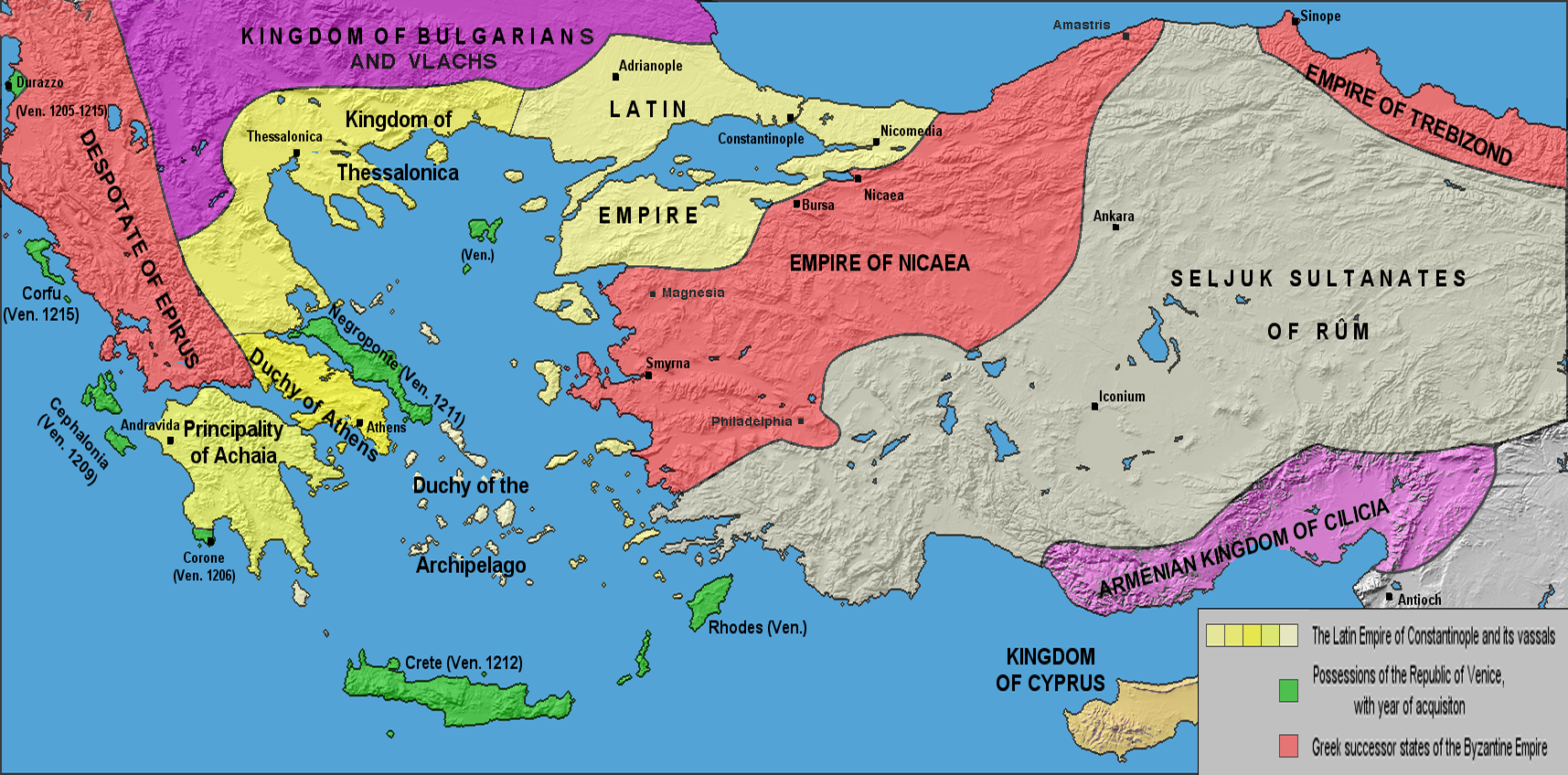
The Aegean world in the early 13th century. Adrianople was the chief city of Thrace.

There is only one primary source that explicitly mentions a Mongol raid into the Latin Empire: the anonymous Austrian Chronicle completed about 1327. Its account was copied into the Chronicle of Leoben and the Annals of Heiligenkreuz. The event is dated to 1243, an obvious error for 1242. According to these Austrian chronicles:

Tatars and Cumans, meeting no resistance or opposition, withdrew from Hungary with an endless booty of gold and silver, garments and animals, leading many captives of both sexes to the scandal of the Christians. Entering Greece, they depopulated the entire land except for the castles and well-fortified cities. But the king of Constantinople, named Baldwin, went out in battle against them, at first he was victorious, but the second time he was defeated by them.

A brief account in the Chronography of the Syriac prelate Bar Hebraeus (died 1286) must refer to the Mongol invasions of Bulgaria and Thrace in 1242, although it is mis-dated to 1232:

And the Khan continued to wax strong. And he prepared to attack Constantinople from the quarter of the Bulgarians. And the kings of the Franks heard of this, and they gathered together and they met Batu in battle, and they broke him and made him flee.

This passage seems to confirm that the Mongol armies in Bulgaria, which were under the overall command of Batu, attacked in the direction of Constantinople and were defeated at some point either by the Bulgars or the Latins.

John of Garland in his epic poem On the Triumph of the Church, which he completed about 1252 while teaching at the University of Paris, lists the victims of the expansion of the Mongol Empire:

The avenger arriving from the East mows down everything he encounters
And subdues the West with his sword.
The leaders of Armenia are dead, the lords of Syria surrender,
The Black Sea groans at the yoke of subjection.
The Caucasus bows, the Danube offers up its weapons in surrender,
Thrace, defeated, mourns its leader.

As Thrace was part of the Latin Empire, John implies that its ruler, Baldwin II, was killed while defending the region against the Mongols. While this was not so, there is evidence that the rumour of Baldwin's death was circulating in western Europe in 1242. Philippe Mouskes in his Rhymed Chronicle of French history, which goes up to 1242, reports that in that year news reached the French court "from Greece ... that the emperor was dead." Prince Geoffrey II of Achaea, who was married to Baldwin's sister Agnes, even sailed with an army to Constantinople on the basis of this rumour, perhaps hoping to seize the throne. There is contrary evidence from papal letters, however, indicating that the false rumour of Baldwin's death was current in Europe only between the fall of 1243 and early 1244.

The historian Joseph von Hammer-Purgstall in the 19th century was the first modern historian to notice the passage in the Chronicon Austriacum and attribute the attack to Kadan's army then passing through Bulgaria.

== Invasion ==
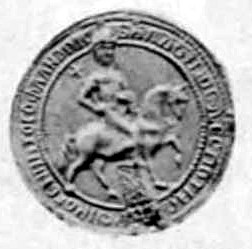
Baldwin II portrayed as a king on horseback on his seal.

Baldwin II had made an alliance with some Cumans under their leaders Saronius and Jonas by 1239. It seems likely that he was giving shelter to Cumans fleeing the Mongols. The same act of giving shelter to the Mongols' Cuman enemies was the pretext for the Mongol invasion of Hungary, and probably also for the invasion of Bulgaria. It is likely that the attack on the Latin Empire resulted from the same motive: to punish the protectors of the Cumans.

Baldwin II was in Constantinople on 12 February 1242, when he addressed a letter to King Louis IX of France. He was again in Constantinople when he addressed a letter to Louis's influential mother, Blanche of Castile, on 5 August 1243. The Mongol invasion must have taken place between these dates, since it drew Baldwin away from the capital. The sources indicate only that the battles took place in Greece, a broad term in medieval sources, which could mean all the territory claimed by the Latin and Byzantine empires. It definitely included Thrace, which was part of the Latin Empire and bordered Bulgaria, which makes it the likely location of the Mongol raids.

According to the Chronicon Austriacum, Baldwin fought two battles with the invading force, which included some Cuman allies of the Mongols. Historians have offered several explanations of the Austrian chronicle's two battles and for Baldwin's motive in riding out to meet the invader. Peter Jackson suggests that Baldwin's initial victory may have come at the expense of these Cumans before the Mongol force arrived to defeat him. John Giebfried, on the other hand, suggests that the two battles may in fact be two phases of a single battle, making Baldwin II the victim of a feigned retreat. He argues, however, that Baldwin possessed sufficiently strong forces to have defeated a Mongol army. He had an alliance of his own with a group of Cumans and had recruited a large army in western Europe for his crusade against Tzurulon in 1239. Jean Richard suggests that in 1242 Baldwin may have been defending his Cuman allies when they came under Mongol attack. Henry Howorth suggests that he had been called to the defence of the young ruler of Bulgaria, Kaliman I, who was his vassal.

Baldwin may have been captured after his defeat, which would explain how rumours of his death originated. In that event, he was likely forced to accept Mongol overlordship and to make annual tribute payments in return for release.

== Aftermath ==
By 1251 or 1252, Baldwin II certainly had diplomatic relations with the Mongol Empire, since he sent an ambassador, Baldwin of Hainaut, all the way to the imperial Mongol capital of Karakorum. In 1253, he gave William of Rubruck, a Franciscan missionary, letters of recommendation for Sartaq, the son of Batu, khan of the Golden Horde. Batu was Kadan's superior in 1242 and his army had also invaded Bulgaria.

Jean Richard suggests that Baldwin of Hainaut's mission was a renewal of submission, since a new khan had been elected since 1242. The Latin Empire is not listed by William of Rubruck among the tributaries of the Mongol Empire, however, nor was Baldwin II excommunicated for accepting Mongol overlordship as Bohemond V of Antioch was.

The Mongol invasion of the Latin Empire took place just a year before the Mongols' crushing victory over the Seljuks of Anatolia at the Battle of Köse Dağ (26 June 1243). Although Baldwin II had negotiated an alliance with the Seljuks in 1241, it was the Byzantine emperor John III Vatatzes who provided aid to the Seljuks, his erstwhile enemies, at a critical juncture in 1242 while they were under Mongol attack. As a result, the position of Vatatzes was strengthened with regards to the rump Seljuk state and the position of Baldwin, defeated by the Mongols himself, was weakened. Moreover, a two-year truce between Baldwin and Vatatzes expired on 24 June 1243. The Byzantine emperor seems to have taken advantage of Baldwin's situation to attempt to retake Constantinople, albeit unsuccessfully, as reported in the chronicle of Martin da Canal.

== Sources ==
- Giebfried, John (2013). "The Mongol Invasions and the Aegean World (1241–61)". Mediterranean Historical Review. 28 (2): 129–39. doi:10.1080/09518967.2013.837640. S2CID 162681768.
- Hammer-Purgstall, Joseph von (1840). Geschichte der goldenen Horde in Kiptschak, das ist: Der Mongolen in Russland. Pest: C. A. Hartleben.
- Howorth, Henry H. (1880). History of the Mongols from the 9th to the 19th Century, Part II: The So-Called Tartars of Russia and Central Asia, Division I. New York: Burt Franklin. ISBN 978-0-343-14643-6.
- Jackson, Peter (2005). The Mongols and the West, 1221–1410. Routledge.
- Longnon, Jean (1969). "The Frankish States in Greece, 1204–1311" (PDF). In R. L. Wolff; H. W. Hazard (eds.). A History of the Crusades, Volume 2: The Later Crusades, 1189–1311. University of Minnesota Press. pp. 234–74.
- Madgearu, Alexandru (2016). The Asanids: The Political and Military History of the Second Bulgarian Empire (1185–1280). Leiden: Brill.
- Richard, Jean (1992). "À propos de la mission de Baudouin de Hainaut: l'empire latin de Constantinople et les mongols". Journal des Savants. 1 (1): 115–121. doi:10.3406/jds.1992.1554.
- Van Tricht, Filip (2019). The Horoscope of Emperor Baldwin II: Political and Sociocultural Dynamics in Latin–Byzantine Constantinople. Leiden: Brill.
- Vásáry, István (2005). Cumans and Tatars: Oriental Military in the Pre-Ottoman Balkans, 1185–1365. Cambridge University Press.
