= Anonymi Chronicon Austriacum =

The Anonymi Chronicon Austriacum (Anonymous Austrian chronicle) is an anonymous Middle Latin chronicle that covers the years 973–1327. It was first published in 1793 by Adrian Rauch alongside the Annales Zwetlenses, both from a paper manuscript he found in the Bibliotheca Palatina Vindobonensis (Palatine Library of Vienna).

It is an important source for the late 13th and early 14th century in Austria. It also contains pertinent information about France during the reigns of the German kings Adolf (1292–98) and Albert I (1298–1308). It is the only source for the Mongol raid in the Latin Empire in 1242. Its account of this raid was copied into the Chronicon Leobiense and the Continuatio Sancrucensis.

== Editions ==
- "Anonymi Chronicon Austriacum", in Adrian Rauch (ed.), Rerum Austriacarum Scriptores, vol. 2 (Vienna, 1793), pp. 209–312.
- "Chronicon Austriacum anonymi", in Ferenc Albin Gombos (ed.), Catalogus fontium historiae Hungaricae aevo ducum et regum ex stirpe Arpad descendentium ab anno Christi dccc usque ad annum mccci, vol. 1 (Budapest, 1937), pp. 504–18.
