= Analia Bortz =

Argentine medical doctor and rabbi

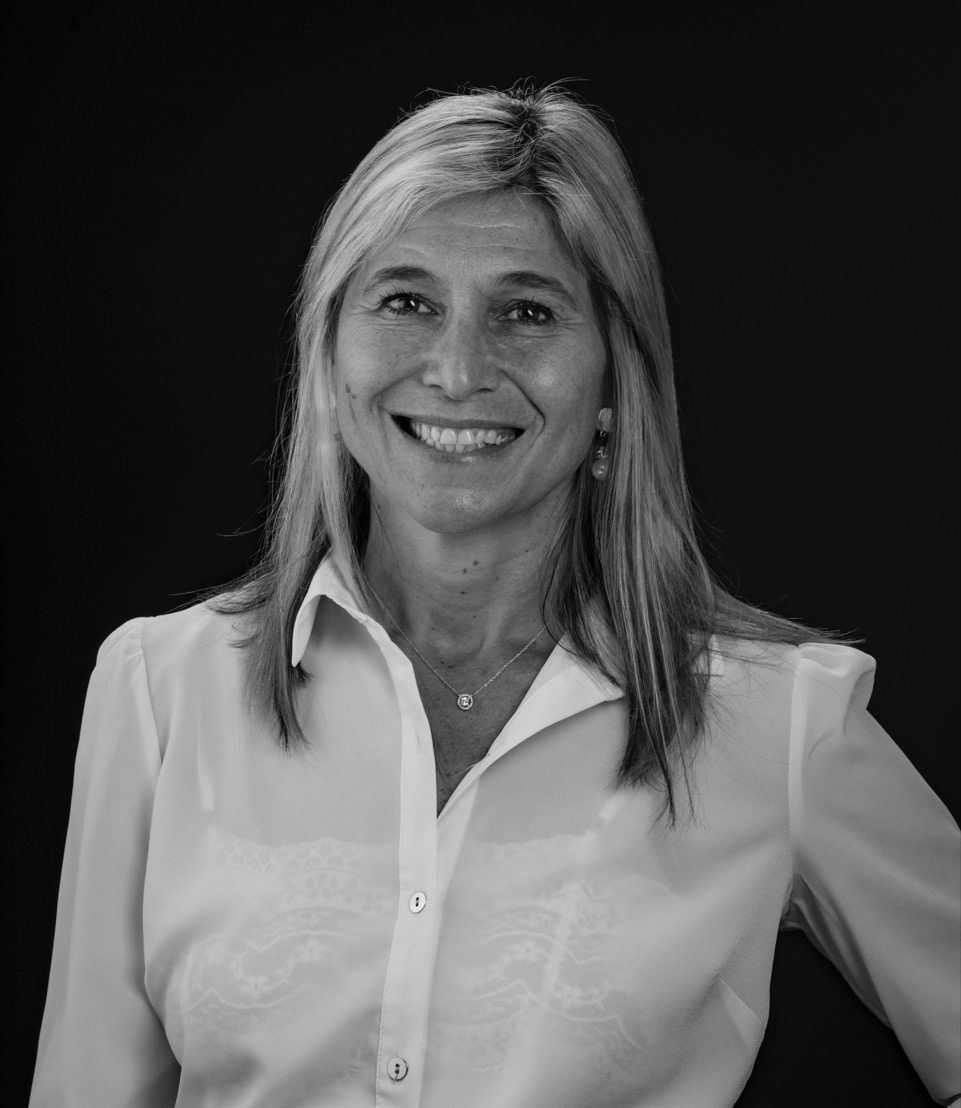

Personal life
- Born: 1967 (age 58–59) Buenos Aires
- Spouse: Rabbi Mario Karpuj
- Education: University of Buenos Aires, MD; Seminario Rabínico Latinoamericano, semikhah; Catholic University of Valparaiso, PhD; OR-ZSE, Hungary
- Occupation: Rabbi and bio-ethicist Founder co-Director Center for Ethics, The Vatican-Universidad Abarvanel- Seminario Rabinico LatinoAmericano

Religious life
- Religion: Judaism

Jewish leader
- Synagogue: Congregation Or Hadash Founder Rabbi Emerita Congregation Or Hadash

Analia Bortz (born February 1967) is an Argentine medical doctor with postdoctoral studies in bioethics. She became the first female Latin American rabbi when ordained in Jerusalem at the Seminario Rabinico Latinoamericano in 1994. In 2003, she and her husband, Rabbi Mario Karpuj, founded Congregation Or Hadash in Sandy Springs, Georgia. In 2018 Rabbi Dr. Analia Bortz was chosen as 1 of the most influential women in the world by the BBC. In 2023 Rabbi Dr. Bortz became the Founding co-director at the Center for Ethics at the Vatican and the University Abarvanel- Seminario Rabinico LatinoAmericano. In February 2024 Rabbi Dr. Analia Bortz launched the first Center for Ethics at the Vatican, in collaboration with Pope Francis, and Monseñor Vicenzo Paglia.

== Education and early life ==
Bortz was born in February 1967 in Buenos Aires to two doctors as parents. Her maternal grandparents emigrated to Argentina from Poland between the two World Wars, and her paternal great-grandparents emigrated from Russia in 1881 as early Jewish gauchos. She grew up in a very Zionist Jewish community and attended a Jewish day school. When Bortz was 14, she met Mario Karpuj, her future husband, when he was on a school trip to Buenos Aires. They married about eight years later.

== Career ==
Due to her familial background, Bortz began studying medicine. Early in her education, she became interested in a more holistic and spiritual approach to the human body, which was not addressed in medical school until the fourth year. Based on this interest, Bortz began sitting in on classes at the Seminario Rabínico Latinoamericano during her time as a medical student at the University of Buenos Aires. She continued her medical studies, earning her medical degree in 1990, and was ordained as a rabbi four years later. She obtained her PhD in Ethics from the Catholic University of Valparaiso.

In the aftermath of the AMIA bombing, Bortz and Karpuj were actively involved in identifying bodies and supporting the deceaseds' loved ones. At the time, they had one child and decided they did not want to raise their family there. They moved to Chile, where they had another child. Five years later, the immigrated to the United States, settling in Atlanta, Georgia. They worked at Ahavath Achim Synagogue for three years before establishing their synagogue, Congregation Or Hadash in 2003.

In 2004, Bortz joined the second cohort of the Shalom Hartman Institute in Jerusalem's Rabbinic Leadership Initiative, graduating as a Senior Rabbinic Fellow in 2007. Bortz is a 2017 graduate and facilitator of the Center for Compassionate Integrity and Secular Ethics at Life University. She also taught at the Florence Melton Adult School, a Hebrew University of Jerusalem project.

As a vocal activist against anti-Semitism, Bortz has spoken twice at the UN (2015 and 2016)

In 2017, Bortz publishedThe Voice of Silence: A Rabbi's Journey into a Trappist Monastery and Other Contemplation (2017), which is about her silent retreat at the Christian monastery called Monastery of the Holy Spirit. She went there after having vocal cord strain and polyps and being advised to stop speaking for a long time.

In 2020, Bortz and Karpuj moved to Israel.

== Bioethics and medical activism ==
As a doctor and rabbi, Bortz has worked in bioethics. She helped create the Bioethics Committees in Chile and Children's Healthcare of Atlanta.

Bortz founded the Jewish Fertility Foundations of Atlanta and "Hope for Seeds" for couples struggling with infertility and sterility.

Bortz is an active member of JScreen advocating for research and prophylaxis of genetic disorders with greater incidence in the Ashkenazi Jewish population.

In 2017, Bortz co-founded "BaKeN (in the Nest): "בריאות-קהילה-נפש", an initiative to create positive and loving enforcement for those with mental health illness and for caregivers who support them, combating the societal stigmatization of mental illness.

== Honors ==
- 2011: Recipient of a YWCA Women of Achievement award for her work on infertility.
- 2011: Nominated as Jewish Hero of the Year
- 2013-2015: Rabbinic Advisory Board member of the Shalom Hartman Institute in Jerusalem and North America
- 2015: Delegate of BEINGS (BIOTECH and Ethical Imagination) at Emory University
- 2014: Listed among Tablet Magazine's "15 American Rabbis You Haven't Heard Of, But Should".
- 2018: BBC 100 Women
- 2019: Forward 50 The Makers and the Shakers of America's Most Influential Leaders
- 2019-2020: American Jewish World Service (AJWS) Global Justice Fellow
- 2021: Honorary Doctor of Divinity Degree, Jewish Theological Seminary
- 2022 Acceptance as a PhD in Or-ZSE, Hungary
- 2024 Founding director of the Center for Ethics, Isaac Abarbanel University Institute, launched at the Vatican.

== Publications ==
=== Books ===
- The Voice of Silence, A Rabbi's Journey into a Trappist Monastery and Other Contemplations, Westbow-Nelson Publishing 2019. ISBN 978-1512793949
- My Come-to-Jesus Moment with the Rabbi : A Dark, but Often Humorous Journey through Depression, Mountain Arbor Press, 2020. ISBN 978-1631837814

=== Chapters and Articles ===
- Chapter in The Women's Torah Commentary
- Chapter in The Women's Haftarah Commentary: New Insights from Women Rabbis on the 54 Weekly Haftarah Portions, the 5 Megillot & Special Shabbatot
- "Theologia: Jutzpa?" Maj-Shavot.
- "En la búsqueda Permanente de la Respuesta Divina." Majshavot. 2013. ("Permanent seekers of God's Answers: Struggles with Bioethical quests")
- Beware of the Tent Peg: Jael and the Hermeneutics of Subversion
- A Female Interpretation on Emmanuel Levinas' "Other"
- Deborah and Jael in Judges 4 & 5: And the Women Prevail
- Contextualizing the Book of Judges: History webHistoriography through Male and Female lenses
