= Frumușeni =

- Commune
- Location in Romania
- Coordinates: 46.1°N 21.4833°E
- Country: Romania
- County: Arad
- Population (2021-12-01): 2,600
- Time zone: EET/EEST (UTC+2/+3)
- Vehicle reg.: AR

Frumușeni (German: Schöndorf; Hungarian: Szépfalu) is a commune in Arad County, Romania. It lies in the north-eastern part of the Vinga Plateau. It is composed of two villages, Aluniș (Traunau; Cseralja) and Frumușeni (situated at 17 km from Arad). These were part of Fântânele Commune until 2004, when they were split off.

== Population ==
According to the last census, the population of the commune counts 2690 inhabitants, out of which 98.5% are Romanians, 0.6% Hungarians, 0.8% Germans and 0.1% are of other or undeclared nationalities.

== History ==
The first documentary record of Frumușeni dates back to 1080–1090, although the traces of inhabitance on this area originate from the Bronze Age. On the territory of the commune, at the place known as "Dosul Caprei" a reinforced settlement belonging to the period mentioned above and two settlements originating from the Iron Age have been discovered.

Aluniş was founded in 1785 (as Traunau) during the Josephine colonization, primarily by German speaking, Catholic settlers. It belonged to the parish of Guttenbrunn until 1788, when it became an independent parish. The parish church was inaugurated in October, 1813. This church was later replaced by the present one, which was inaugurated on November 7, 1839.

== Economy ==
The economy of the commune is mainly agricultural, both component sectors are well-developed.

== Tourism ==
Due to the value of the built fond, as well as the form and organization of the households, the architectural complex of the locality has been included in the area with cultural value of national interest.
