= The Lives of the Brethren =

The Lives of the Brethren (Latin: Vitae Fratrum) is an early account of the first members of the Order of Preachers, also known as the Dominicans. Vitae Fratrum is potentially confusing as there are several works which are often abbreviated to that name. The book that records the early history of the Dominican order is the Vitae Fratrum Ordinis Praedicatorum. This is to be distinguished from other works such as the Vitae fratrum eremitarum Ordinis Sancti Pauli Primi Eremitae, which is a fifteenth-century account of the Pauline Hermits in Hungary, or the Liber vitasfratrum of Jordan of Quedlinburg, which recounts the early history of the Order of Saint Augustine.

== History of the text ==
The Lives of the Brethren was written between about 1255 to 1260 by Gerard de Frachet. Gerard (also known as Gerald) was born in Chalons (Haute Vienne) in Aquitaine, joined the Order of Preachers (Dominicans) in around 1225, and died at Limoges sometime between 1271 and 1281.

The book was written as a result of a request from the General Chapter in 1256 which was anxious to collect eyewitness accounts of the doings and sayings of the early friars before the first generation of the order died. The text of the Vitae Fratrum is based largely on the submissions made by friars as well as separate writings from Bartholomew of Trent and Jordan of Saxony, covering in all the period from about 1206 to 1260.

The Latin text was edited and published as Vitae fratrum ordinis praedicatorum, ed. B. M. Reichert, MOPH., Louvain, 1896. Placid Conway, O.P. translated a version from later manuscripts than were used for the critical edition, which was published as Lives of the Brethren of the Order of Preachers 1206–1259, translated by Placid Conway, O.P. and edited with notes and introduction by Bede Jarrett, O.P., Blackfriars Publications, London, 1955. Recently, Joseph Kenny, O.P. has translated the work directly from the critical edition.
