= Mongol invasion of Byzantine Thrace (1324) =

1324 Golden Horde military campaign

- Part of the Mongol invasion of Europe
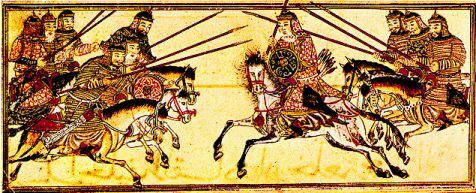
- Artistic depiction of Mongol lancers in a battle, c. 13th–14th centuries
Date	June–July 1324
Location	Thrace, modern-day northeastern Greece and western Turkey
Result	Byzantine victory

Belligerents
Golden Horde; Second Bulgarian Empire	Byzantine Empire

Commanders and leaders
Taitah; Toglu Turgan; Tachbou-Khan	Andronikos III; John Kantakouzenos

Strength
120,000 according to John Kantakouzenos; 300,000 according to Giovanni Villani	Fewer than the Mongols

Mongols of the Golden Horde launched a large-scale invasion of the Byzantine-held territories in Thrace in mid-1324. The Mongol armies, which included the commanders Taitah and Toglu Turgan, attacked with alacrity and dealt widespread destruction, killing or capturing many Byzantine citizens. However, following the initial shock of these incursions, Emperor Andronikos III Palaiologos reorganised Byzantine defensive strategy and began leading forces in pursuit of the Mongol raiding columns. Facing military setbacks, most notably a battlefield defeat against the Byzantines at Promusulos, the Mongol forces were eventually driven out and forced to retreat from Thrace.

== Background ==
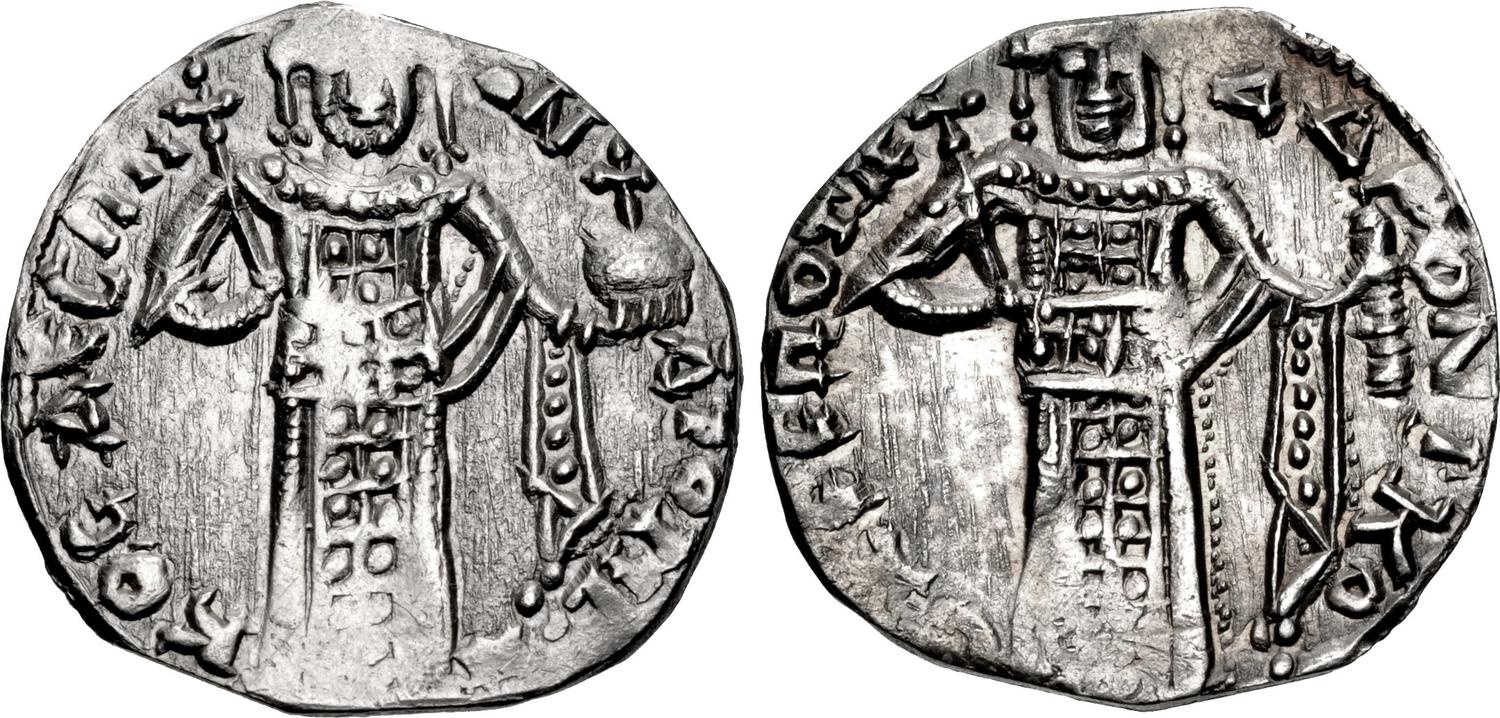
Basilikon depicting Emperor Andronikos II and his rebelling grandson Andronikos III

In the early 14th century, Byzantine Thrace was subject to repeated incursions by the Mongols of the Golden Horde. The Emperor Andronikos II attempted a diplomatic solution to prevent these attacks by sending imperial princesses in marriage, both to Khan Toqta and to his successor Özbeg, yet this policy failed to deter raiders. In 1320, a small Mongol warband raided as far as Adrianople, while the following year a far larger army ravaged Thrace while Anronikos III campaigned against Andronikos II near Constantinople. Although the latter inflicted devastation on Byzantine lands, the regional governors of Thrace had managed to evacuate most of the local populace into fortified towns and cities before the arrival of the Mongols, which limited the human cost of the incursion, as the Mongols did not attempt to besiege these settlements during their raid. In 1322, the Byzantine Empire became engaged in a war against the Bulgarian Empire, after the forces of George II attacked Thrace and occupied the city of Philipopolis. During Andronikos' subsequent attempt to recapture the city, the Bulgarian garrison within the city, commanded by Ivan the Russian, included Mongol troops, demonstrating that the Bulgarians enjoyed the support of their Golden Horde sovereigns in their conflict with Byzantines. With the Byzantine forces in Thrace arrayed against the Bulgarians, the Golden Horde used the opportunity to initiate a new invasion into Thrace far larger than before. According to John Kantakouzenos, the invading Mongol army numbered 120,000, while the Florentine chronicler Giovanni Villani claimed the strength of the force to have been 300,000 horsemen. Modern historians however consider these figures inflated. Nonetheless, the invading force was very large and Kantakouzenos describes the division of the army into several Mingghan and Tumen units (described as Chiliarchs and Myriarchs in Greek), according to Mongol military organisation. Two commanders of this invasion force named in Kantakouzenos' account were Taitah and Toglu Turgan. (Note: Invasions from the Golden horde reached such intensity that in the 1320s, the Mongols came to be considered the main existential threat to the Byzantine Empire by several Western and Muslim commentators.) (Note: John Kantakouzenos noted that following the war, some of Andronikos III's supporters began spreading rumours that Andronikos II had secretly contacted Özbeg Khan to encourage the invasion, with the intention of weakening Andronikos III and his powerbase. Kantakouzenos himself dismissed these claims, but modern scholarship on the matter is divided. Ursula Victoria Bosch argued that the Mongol invasion was prompted by Andronikos II, while Angeliki Laiou considered this to be an unlikely possibility.)

== Invasion ==
=== Mongol raids in Thrace ===
Taitah and Toglu advanced rapidly towards the fertile valleys of central Thrace, and this time the swiftness of the attack allowed them to inflict greater damage on the local populace, many of whom were unable to reach fortified locales in time. The Mongols established an encampment, from which they dispatched columns to ravage the area. This state of affairs continued over 40 days, over which time the Mongols inflicted severe devastation; Giovanni Villani writes, with considerable exaggeration, that 150,000 people were killed or enslaved in Thrace during this invasion, with considerable quantities of loot also being collected by Taitah and Toglu's forces. Although Andronikos III was unable to muster the entirety of his forces, as many of his men were garrisoning cities and fortresses positioned against the Bulgarians, he collected as many men as possible into a field army and attempted to intercept Mongol raiding columns in Thrace. However, after a 15-day campaign, in which the Byzantines failed to catch any of the swift-riding warbands, Andronikos and his men retired to Adrianople, as the city contained enough supplies to provision the whole army.

=== Battle of Promusulos ===
Having initially met little success in his efforts to repulse the Mongols, Andronikos resolved to march out against the enemy once again. Leaving the greater part of his army to defend Adrianople, he marched out, alongside his Domestikos John Kantakouzenos, with his cavalry forces to renew his attempt to engage the Mongols. The Byzantines advanced towards Didymoteicho, but on their march sighted an advancing Mongol army near the fortress of Promusulos, which had collected a large train of booty and captives. Andronikos positioned his men in a concealed area, where he consulted Kantakouzenos and his other officers on how to proceed. Although inferior in numbers to the Mongols, the Byzantine leadership decided to attack, as their usually mobile enemies were weighed down by their loot. When Andronikos announced the decision to his men they readily agreed, being eager to avenge the atrocities inflicted by the Mongols on Thrace. The Byzantines then dismounted their horses to conduct prayers, before remounting to prepare for battle.

With his soldiers in high spirits, Andronikos began his attack against the Mongols. Witnessing the advance of the Byzantines, the Mongols who had encamped near Promusulos quickly formed for battle and marched out to meet them. An additional Mongol force that had encamped at the Hebrus River nearby also moved to attack Andronikos, and as a result the Byzantines were vastly outnumbered at the time battle was joined. (Note: According to John Kantakouzenos, the Mongol cavalry was ten times as numerous as Andronikos' force at the battle of Promusulos.) The ensuing battle was fiercely contested, but eventually the Byzantine attack shattered the Mongol lines. Andronikos' men killed large numbers of their enemy and captured others before chasing the routing Mongols. During the pursuit, the Byzantines managed to pin part of the Mongol army against the Hebrus River and force them into it to drown, with only 28 of the Mongol warriors managing to swim across to safety. After their victory, the Byzantines looted the Mongol corpses and wagons, while freeing the Thracians who had been enslaved. Andronikos and his men then continued their journey until they reached Didymoteicho, with the spoils of their victory in toe.

=== Maneuvering and mediatotion at the Tundzha river ===
Basilikon depicting Emperor Andronikos III next to Saint Demetrius

Once news of the defeat reached Taitah and Toglu, they sent a contingent of elite troops to the site of Promusulos in hopes of defeating Andronikos III and rescuing survivors. As the Byzantines had already departed to Didymoteicho and no survivors were found, the troops buried their dead before departing Thrace, heading back to the heartlands of the Golden Horde. Meanwhile, Andronikos soon left Didymoteicho to pursue the rest of the Mongols near the city of Tzernomianos. After a rapid advance, he defeated and put to flight another Mongol column near Morrha. During his pursuit of this force, he was re-joined by the rest of his men, who had marched from Adrianople to meet him. The troops from Adrianople congratulated the emperor for the successes he had achieved, and with his forces reunited, Andronikos moved towards the main column of the Mongol army, hoping to attack it as it crossed the Tundzha River. When the Byzantines arrived at the Tundzha, they found that the enemy had already crossed it, but the appearance of Andronikos' 100-man vanguard caused the Mongol army to halt its retreat and array for battle on the opposite bank. Neither side attempted to join battle however, as the Mongols correctly suspected that the Byzantines had far more soldiers nearby concealed from their view, and the Tundzha river that separated the opposing forces was overflowing. The Byzantines likewise were cautious of joining battle with the numerically superior Mongols, and ultimately the two sides entered dialogue.

Andronikos disguised his himself as a common cavalryman and went with a detachment to the banks of the Tundzha, where he was met by one of the Mongol commanders, Tachbou-Khan, with a retinue of equal size. Andronikos used an interpreter familiar with the language of the Golden Horde to denigrate the Mongol tactics used during the invasion as being cowardly, comparing them to thieves who only attacked defenceless civilians while evading the Byzantine armies. Tachbou simply replied that he and his comrades had launched their raiding invasion under orders from the khan, and then asked the Byzantine delegation whether they had been responsible for the recent destruction of the Mongol army at Promusulos. Andronikos III feigned ignorance in claiming his men had not caused this, but also argued that this was a warranted outcome for invaders brutalizing a foreign people, to which Tachbou agreed but decried the mercilessness shown to the Mongol warriors at Promusulos. The delegations then separated and the Mongols continued their retreat to the Pontic Steppe, with Tachbou still oblivious to the fact he had spoken in person to the Byzantine emperor. Another part of the Mongol army remained in Thrace for several days thereafter to continue raiding. On the basis of Nicephorus Gregoras, Andronikos may have engaged and defeated contingents of this force in further battles, which ultimately compelled this army to follow the others in withdrawing to the steppe, but Gregoras' claim that the Byzantines destroyed the invading forces in their entirety is exaggerated.

== Aftermath ==
Following the retreat of the Mongols in 1324, large-scale raids from the Golden Horde subsided until the late 1330s. Diplomatic exchanges followed, and Andronikos likely continued the previously established Palaiologan policy by marrying one of his daughters to the khan, with the strategic aim of isolating Bulgaria from the support of the Golden Horde. (Note: The Maghrebi traveller Ibn Battuta noted that in 1332, after visiting Özbeg at Sarai, the khan allowed him to accompany one of his wives, a Byzantine princess, on her journey to visit her father in Constantinople. At the time, the Emperor could only have been Andronikos III.) In early 1337, a Mongol force crossed the Danube to raid Thrace, where they encountered and annihilated an army of Turks which had crossed into Europe from Anatolia, also with the intention to raid Thrace. The continuation of Mongol raids prompted John Kantakouzenos to rebuild and fortify Arcadiopolis in 1341, intending to bolster Byzantine defences over the passageways into central Thrace. Around this time, Mongol forces subdued and occupied the port city of Vicina Macaria on the Danube. However, in 1341 an embassy under Demetrios Kydones sent by Andronikos III to Özbeg Khan succeeded in discouraging a major campaign targeting Constantinople that the khan had planned. The continuation of Mongol raids the late 1330s nonetheless brought further devastation to Thrace, weakening one of the empire's economic cores at a time when the Byzantines faced mounting military pressure from the Ottomans, who gradually conquered remaining Byzantine Anatolian possessions and began raiding Thrace themselves.

== Bibliography ==
- Kaldellis, Anthony (2023). The New Roman Empire: A History of Byzantium. Oxford University Press. ISBN 978-0197549322.
- Jackson, Peter (2014) [2005]. The Mongols and the West, 1221-1410. London and New York: Routledge. ISBN 9781317878995.
- Laiou, Angeliki E. (1972). Constantinople and the Latins: The Foreign Policy of Andronicus II, 1282–1328. Harvard University Press. ISBN 0674-16535-7.
- Bosch, Ursula Victoria (1965), Kaiser Andronikos III. Palaiologos. Versuch einer Darstellung der byzantinischen Geschichte in den Jahren 1321–1341 (in German), Adolf M. Hakkert
- Niebuhr, Barthold Georg (1828). Corpus scriptorum historiae byzantinae. Vol. 26. Bonnae: Impensis Ed. Weberi.
- Kyriakidis, Savvas (2011). Warfare in Late Byzantium, 1204–1453. Brill. pp. 190–191.
- Shukurov, Rustam (2016). The Byzantine Turks, 1204–1461. BRILL. ISBN 9789004307759.
- Parisot, Valentin (1845). Cantacuzène, homme d'état et historien (in French). Paris: Firmin Didot Frères.
