= Anonymus Leobiensis =

Anonymus Leobiensis (Anonymous of Leoben) or Chronicon Leobiense (Chronicle of Leoben) is the conventional name for a Latin chronicle written in or shortly after 1345. It covers the years from the incarnation of Christ down to 1345 with an emphasis on the Holy Roman Empire and the Papacy. The author was certainly a cleric and a native of Leoben in the Duchy of Styria (today in Austria). He has been tentatively identified with Conrad of Leoben, a lecturer at the Dominican church in Vienna.

The main sources for the Anonymus Leobiensis are the Liber certarum historiarum of John of Viktring and the Chronicon pontificum et imperatorum of Martin of Opava. A copy of the former was kept at the court of the Duke of Austria in Vienna, while a copy of Martin of Opava's chronicle was expanded in Leoben around 1300, relying on local and Viennese annals and the works of Alexander of Roes. It also borrowed from the Anonymi Chronicon Austriacum of around 1327, which is the original source for the account of the Mongol invasion of the Latin Empire in 1242.
