= Veronica Drăgan =

Romanian entrepreneur

- Born: Daniela Veronica Gușă; 12 July 1973 (age 52); Turda, Cluj County, Socialist Republic of Romania
- Spouse: Iosif Constantin Drăgan (m. 1995; died 2008)
- Children: 3
- Father: Ștefan Gușă

Veronica Gușă de Drăgan (born 12 July 1973) is a Romanian entrepreneur and the widow of Iosif Constantin Drăgan.

== Early and personal life ==
Drăgan was born Daniela Veronica Gușă as the daughter of Ștefan Gușă, a Romanian Army General involved in the 1989 Romanian Revolution who died of cancer in 1994. She was married to Iosif Constantin Drăgan and they had three sons together. At the time of their wedding in 1995, the groom was 78 and the bride, a recent university graduate, was 22.

== Wealth ==
After the death of her husband, Drăgan became the richest Romanian. According to Forbes Romania ranking from 2010, she had an estimated fortune of about 900 million euros.

=== Inheritance ===
Drăgan owns Grupul Drăgan, which includes ButanGas, the Drăgan Foundation, the General Ștefan Gușă Foundation, the Nagard publishing house, the local dailies Renașterea Bănățeană and Redeșteptarea, Ten TV, Drăgan European University of Lugoj, Veroniki Life medical clinic, and Veroniki Art gallery.

=== Reorganization of the holding company ===
One year after her husband's death, Drăgan decided to move the entire family business to a new structure, called Veroniki Holding SpA. Thus, in addition to ButanGas (industrial group with activities in Italy, Albania, Serbia, Greece, Bulgaria, and Romania and a turnover of ButanGas Romania estimated at about 70 million euros), the group is now part of Romconstruct Top, a company acquired for the development of a wind farm in Siliștea, Constanța County.
