= Crang =

Crang may refer to:

- Crâng (disambiguation), the name of some villages in Romania
- Crâng Park, a park in Buzău, Romania
- Mike Crang, a reader in cultural geography at Durham University, UK

== See also ==
- Krang, a villain in the Teenage Mutant Ninja Turtles series
- Krang (disambiguation)
