= Buzău =

City and county seat of Buzău County, Romania

- Municipality
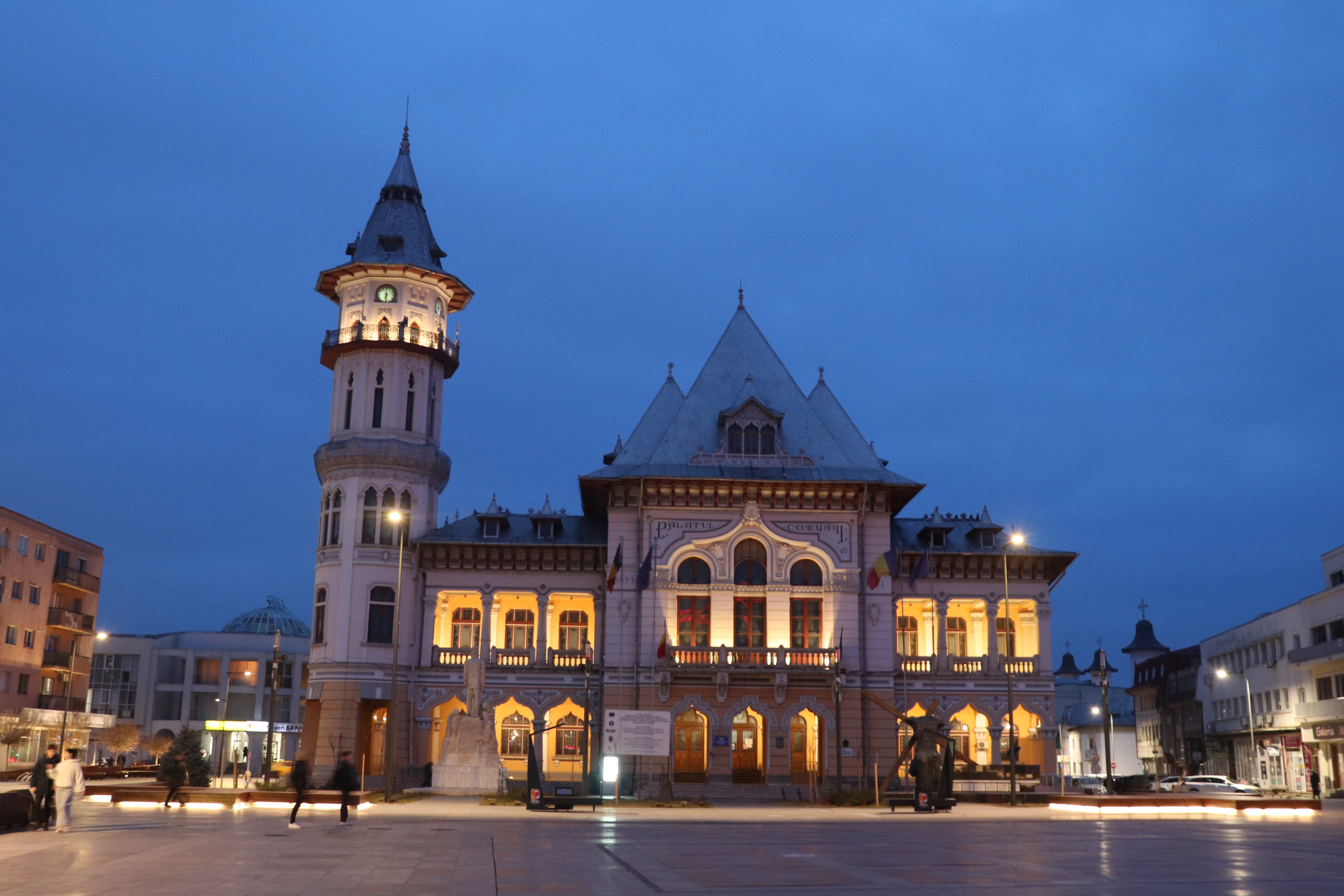
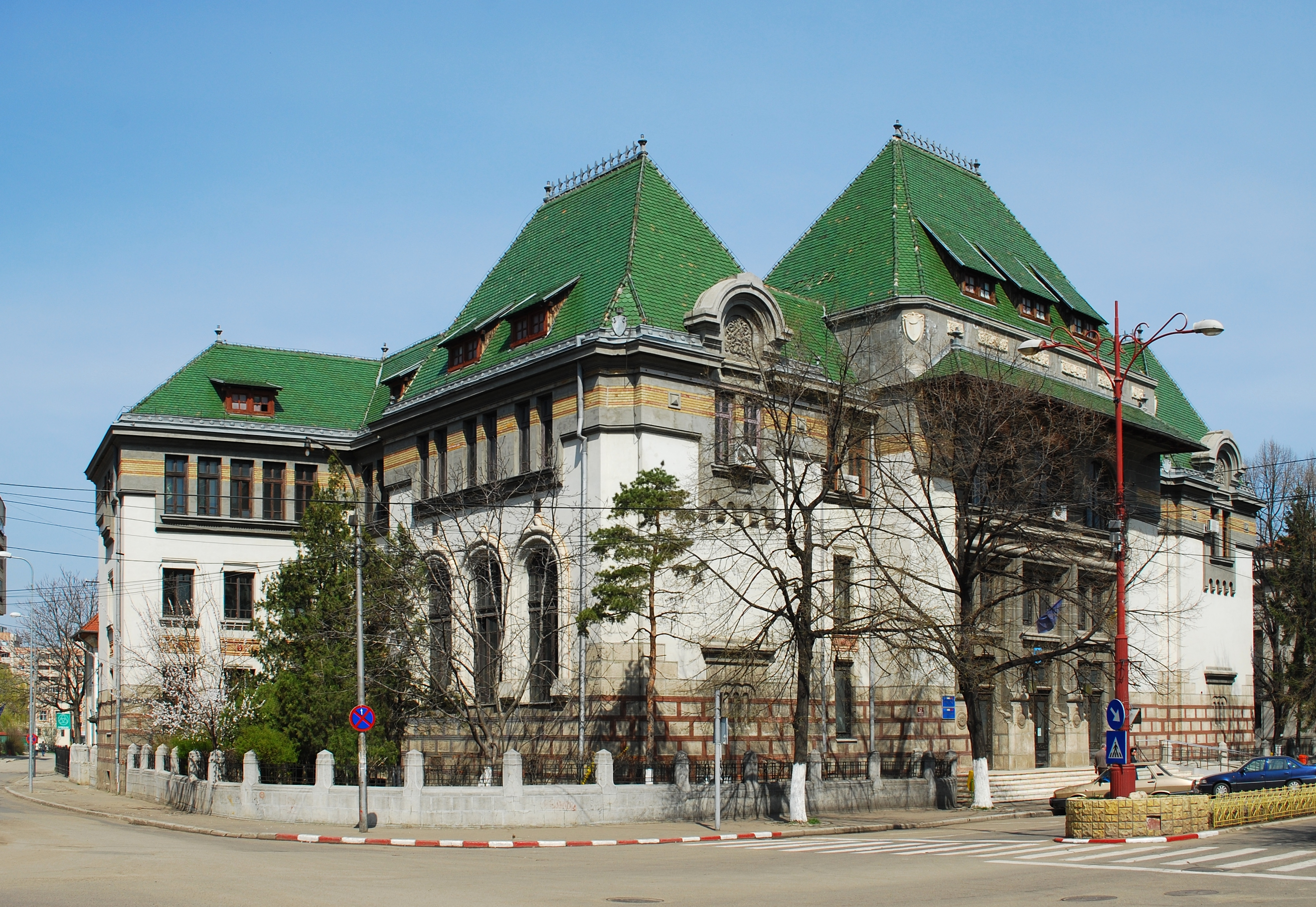
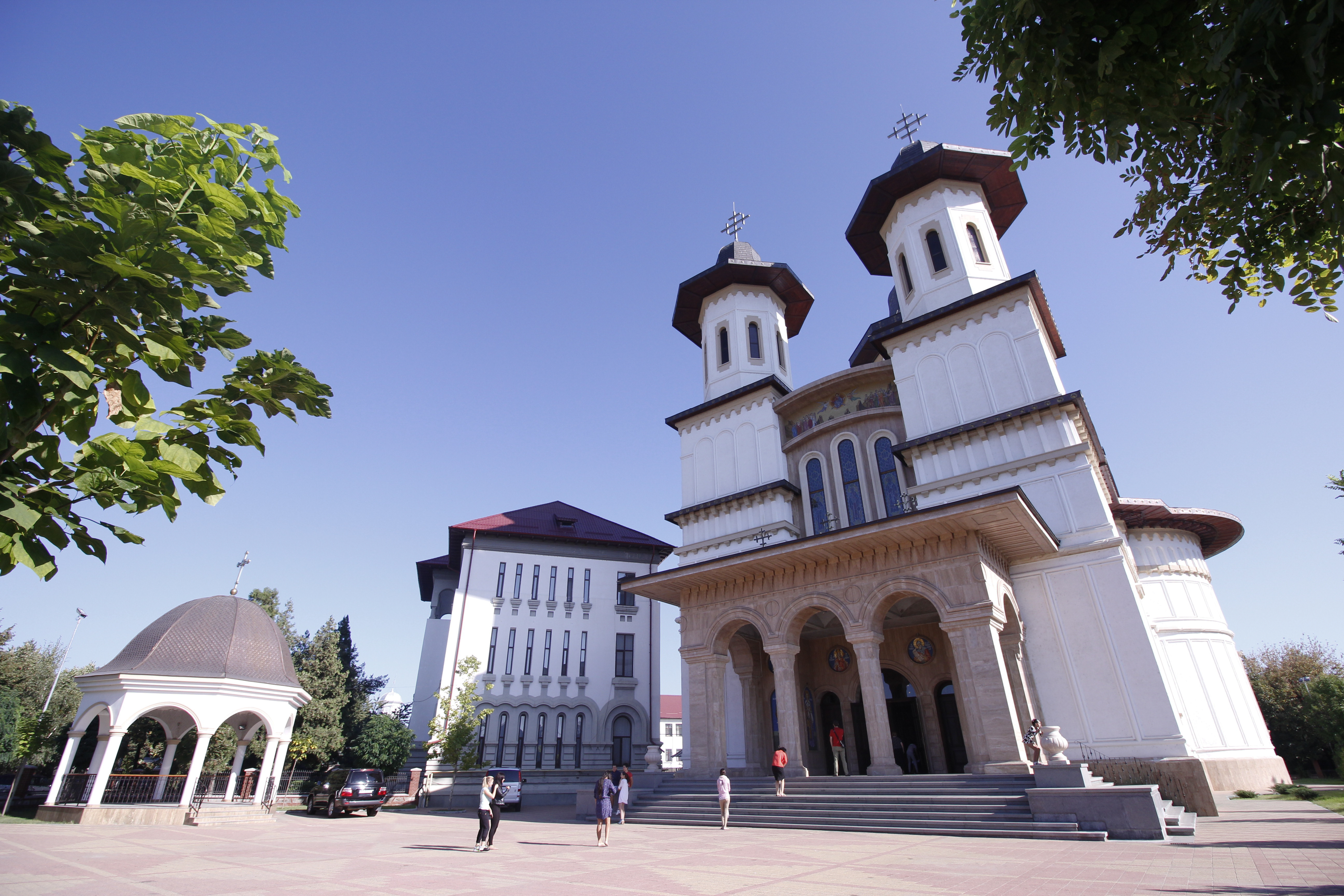
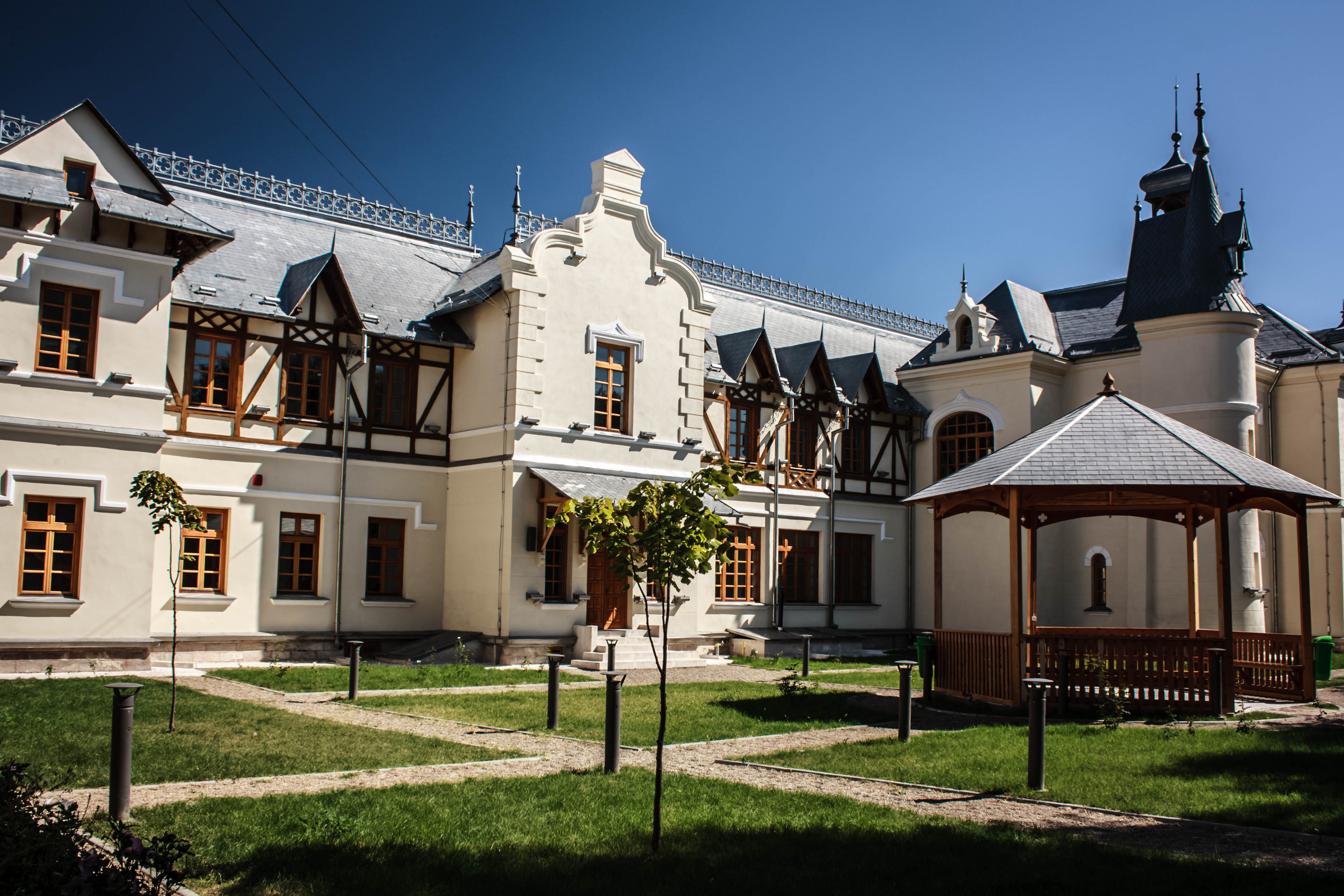
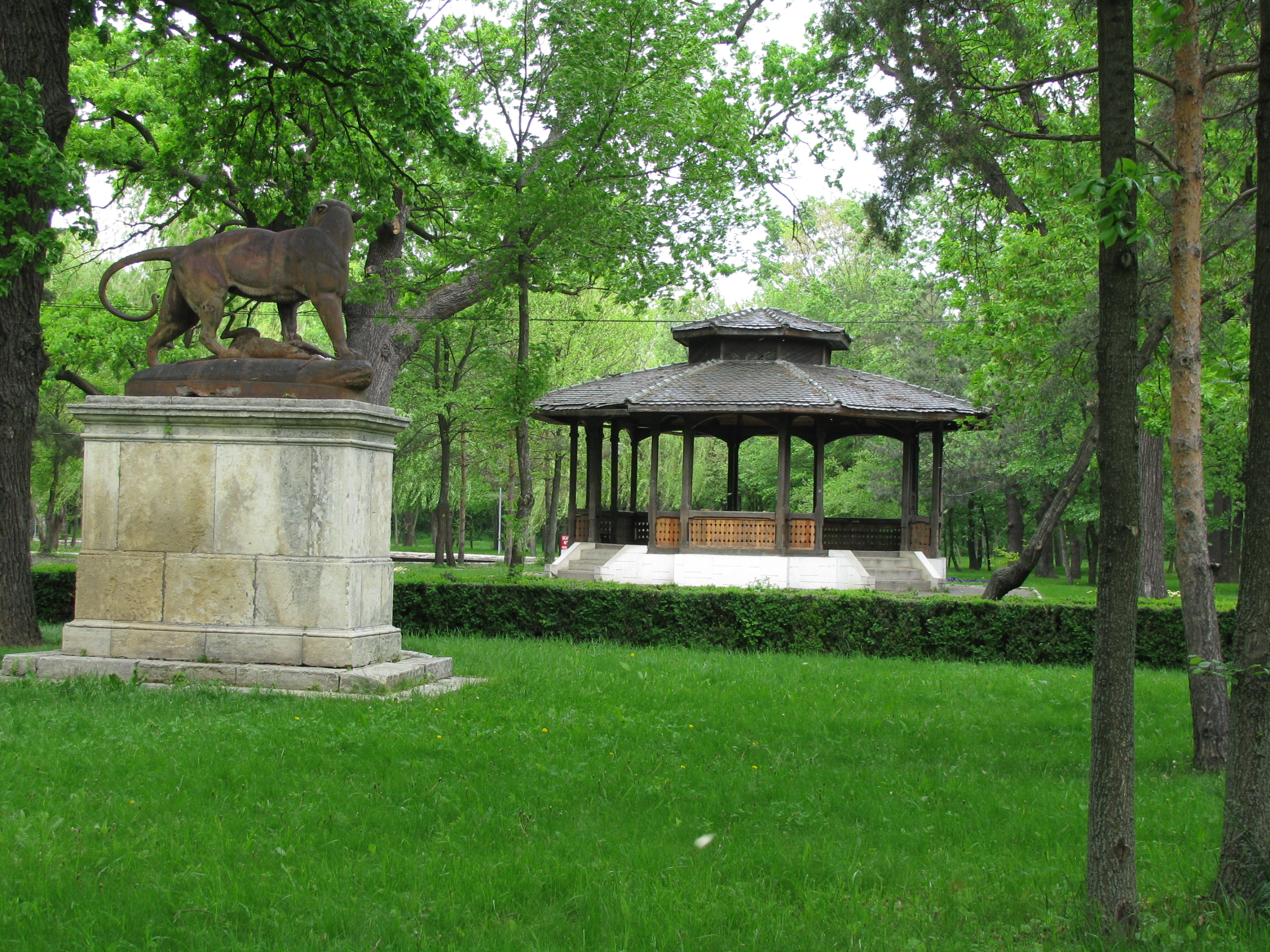
- Buzău Town Hall City Courthouse Bishopric complex Albatros Villa, Marghiloman Park Crâng Park

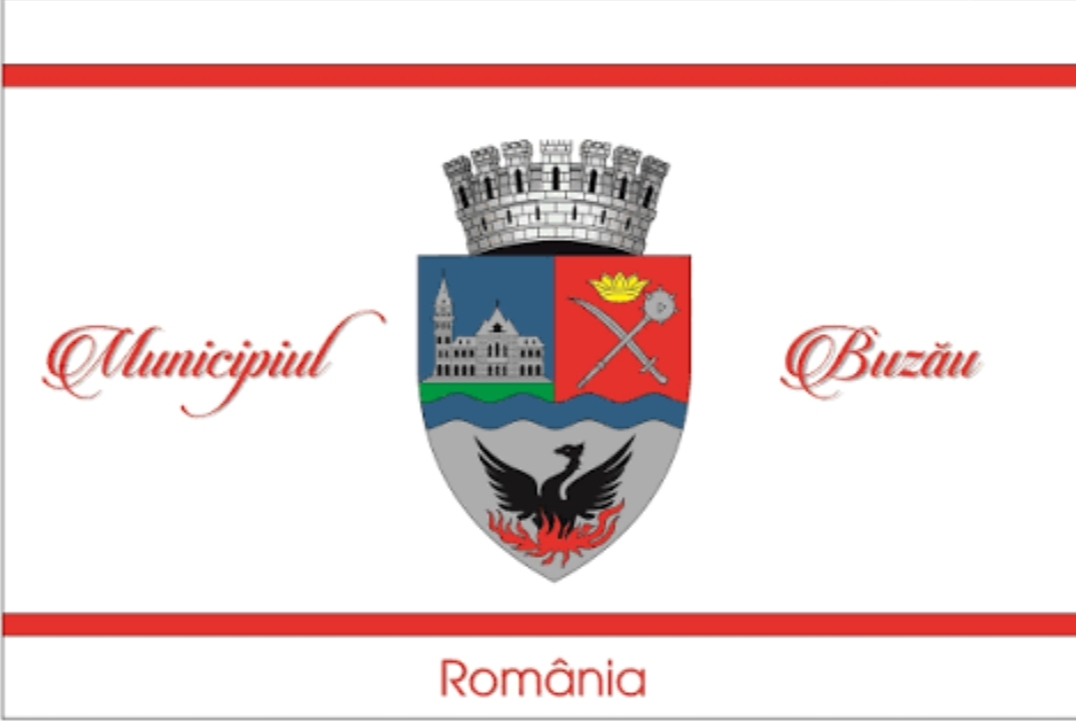
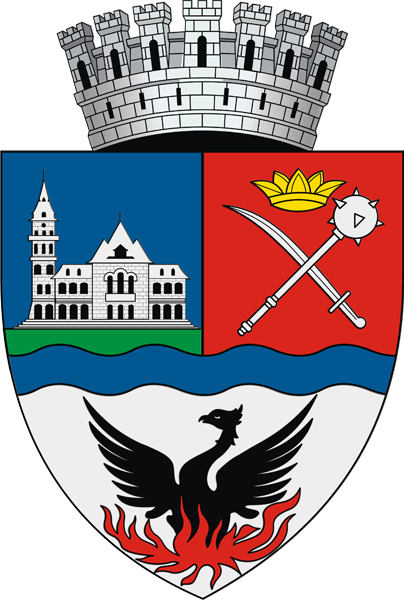
- Flag Coat of arms

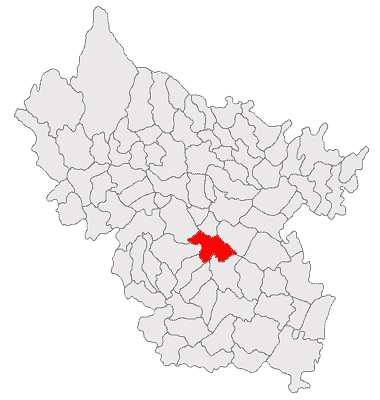
- Location in Buzău County

- Location in Romania
- Coordinates: 45°09′11″N 26°49′15″E
- Country: Romania
- County: Buzău

Government
  - Mayor (2024–2028): Constantin Toma (PSD)
- Area: 81.3 km^{2} (31.4 sq mi)
- Elevation: 95 m (312 ft)
- Population (2021-12-01): 103,481
  - Density: 1,270/km^{2} (3,300/sq mi)
- Time zone: UTC+02:00 (EET)
  - Summer (DST): UTC+03:00 (EEST)
- Postal code: 12xxxx
- Area code: (+40) 238
- Vehicle reg.: BZ
- Website: www.primariabuzau.ro

Buzău (pronounced [buˈzəw]; formerly spelled Buzeu or Buzĕu) is a city in Muntenia, Romania, and the capital of Buzău County. It lies near the right bank of the Buzău River, between the south-eastern curvature of the Carpathian Mountains and the lowlands of the Bărăgan Plain.

The city serves as an important economic, transport, and cultural hub in south-eastern Romania.

Buzău is a key railway junction where routes linking Bucharest to Moldavia and Transylvania to the Black Sea intersect. DN2, part of the European route E85, crosses the city. Its favourable position on trade routes has historically contributed to its development as a commercial and industrial centre.

During the Middle Ages, Buzău served as a market town and Eastern Orthodox episcopal see in Wallachia. The city endured repeated destruction in the 17th and 18th centuries, symbolised today by the phoenix bird on its coat of arms. Buzău began to recover in the 19th century, industrialising and expanding its railway network. Landmarks such as the Communal Palace and Crâng Park date from this period.

Under the communist regime after World War II, Buzău underwent extensive forced industrialisation and rapid population growth. Some of the factories established then continue to operate in the modern market economy.

The city has noted educational and cultural institutions, including the Bogdan Petriceicu Hasdeu National College—attended by George Emil Palade, Romania’s only Nobel laureate—and the Mihai Eminescu National College. The Vasile Voiculescu County Library and the Buzău County Museum are located in the city; the latter also administers the Vasile Voiculescu memorial house in Pârscov and the Amber Museum in Colți.

== Etymology ==
The city is named after the nearby river. In turn, the river is mentioned under the name Μουσεος (Mouseos) in a document written in Greek and dated 376 AD, recounting the martyrdom of Sabbas the Goth. Historian Vasile Pârvan thought that this name is a Greek misspelling of the Thracian word Bouzeos (by losing a π from the Μπ group, which is pronounced like a Latin B). He suggested that the name comes from the Thracian root Buzes, with the addition of the -eu suffix, a form of the Greek-Latin suffix -aios.

== History ==
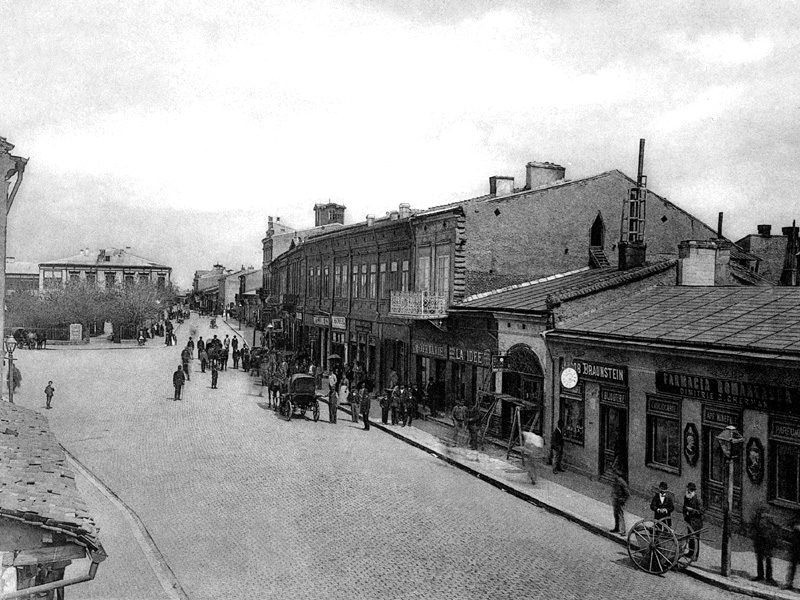
Buzău in early 20th century

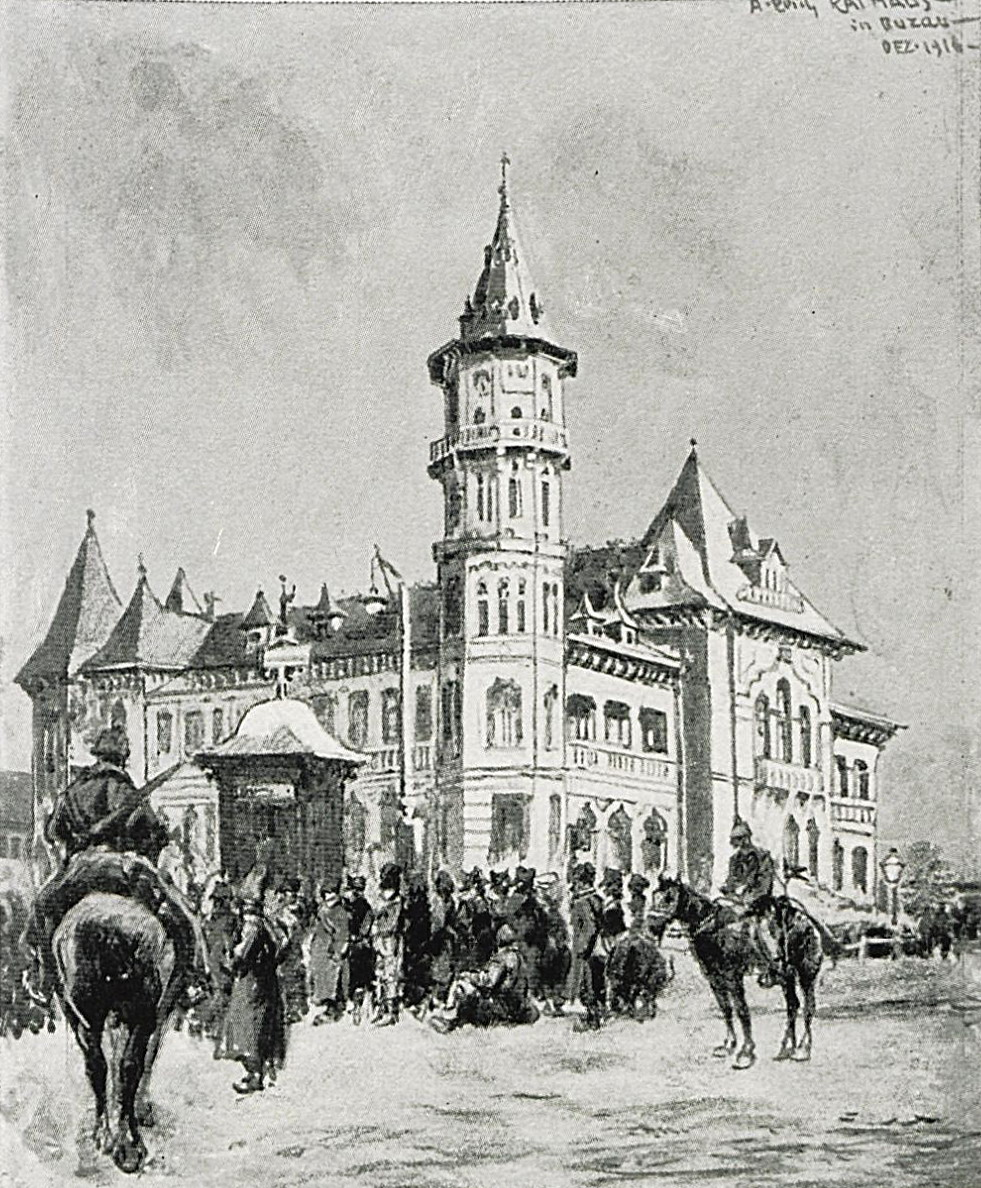
German occupation troops, 1916

The written history of the city begins with that of Wallachia. It was certified as a market town and customs point during the reign of Dan II. Archeological sites belonging to Gumelnița and Monteoru cultures prove the presence of human inhabitants before the Christian era. During the Middle Ages, there was also a fortress of Buzău, but only a few passing mentions in foreign documents are kept. The market that was already flourishing in 1431, has also become an Orthodox episcopal see in the early 16th century.

In the 17th century, an era of war and foreign invasions began, that affected the town and its surroundings. They began with Michael the Brave's participation in the Long Turkish War and ended with the Wallachian uprising of 1821. Natural disasters (epidemics, earthquakes) also took their toll, leading to destruction and depopulation of Buzău. However, the inhabitants always returned and rebuilt the city, which led early 18th century local authorities to use the Phoenix bird on the city seal, as a symbol of rebirth.

The 19th century brought a time of cultural and economical development. The Communal Palace, the city's main landmark, was built at the time, after the city developed its industry and became a railway hub in the 1870s. Schools were open, such as the Theological Seminary în 1836, and the B. P. Hasdeu high school in 1867, and theatre plays were produced (starting 1852): the "Moldavia" theatre house was built in 1898 and used throughout the first half of the 20th century as the main concert and theatre hall, where artists such as George Enescu, C. I. Nottara and Nicolae Leonard performed. For short periods of time, Ion Luca Caragiale and Constantin Brâncuși have lived and worked here.

During World War I, Buzău came under German occupation after mid-December 1916, and many inhabitants took refuge in the nearby villages or in Western Moldavia. The city resumed its development after the war. The interbellum brought about the first sport matches (association football and boxing) and the "Metalurgica" factory, a private business that was to be later confiscated by the communists, and continues to this day as part of a joined venture.

After World War II, the industrialization of Buzău was forcefully accelerated, and its population tripled in less than 50 years; new inhabitants were brought to work in newly built factories mainly in the south of the city. Buzău has profoundly changed its appearance, working class quarters being built instead of the old commercial streets, some historical buildings, such as the Moldavia Theatre, were demolished. Their cultural role was taken over by the Labor Unions' Cultural Center and then by "Dacia" Cinema.

In 2021, there was a project, known as "Buzău Mare 2021" ("Greater Buzău 2021"), that aimed to unite Buzău with the commune of Țintești. On 26 September 2021, a referendum was done to decide this, but as only 10.03% of the population of Buzău voted, which is below the legal threshold requiring a voter turnout of 30%, the results were considered null and Țintești and Buzău were left separate.

=== Historical buildings ===
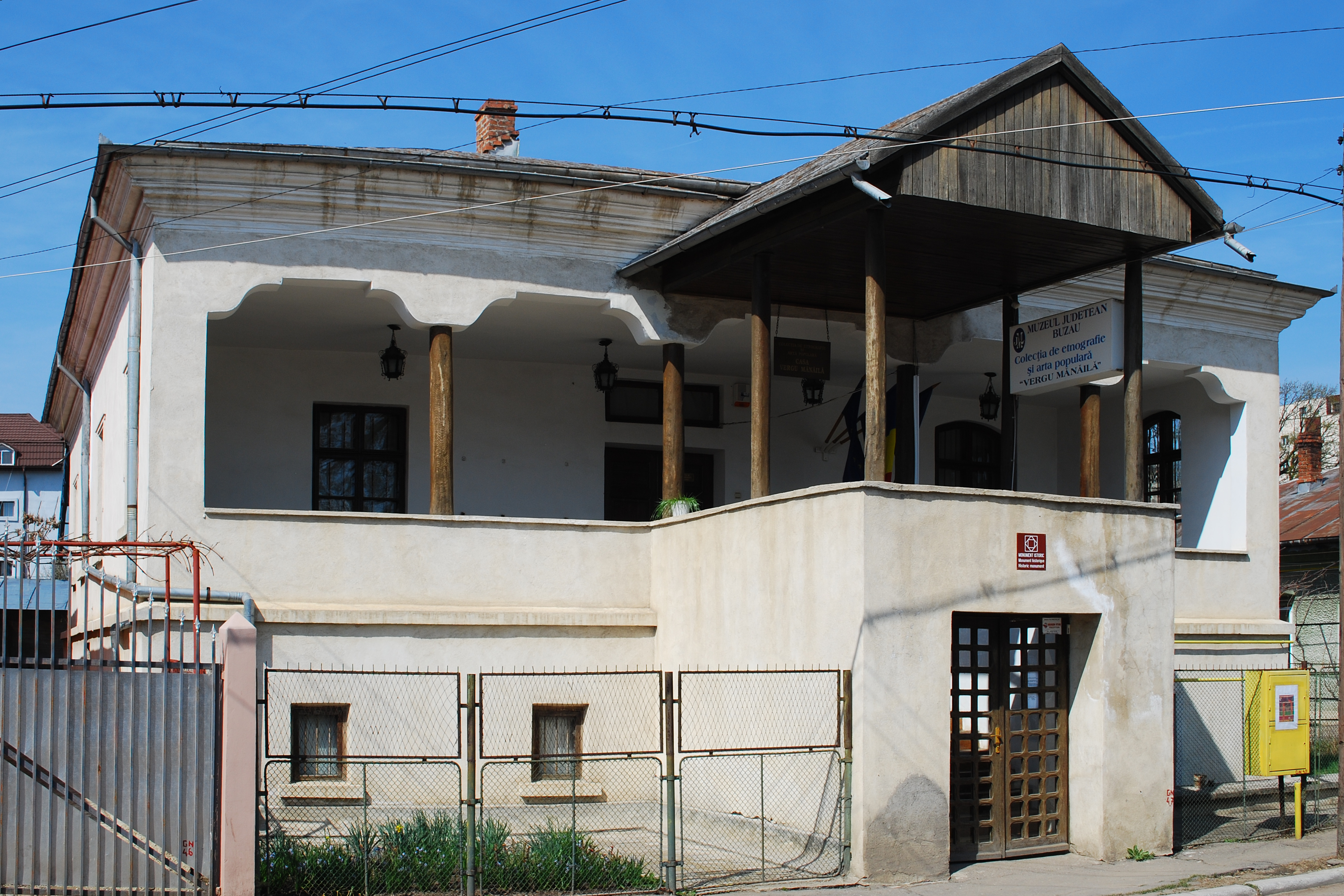
Vergu-Mănăilă house is the oldest habitable building in Buzău, dating from the 1780s. Except for a few churches, it is the only building from the time of successive destructions of Buzău (17th and 18th centuries). It hosts the ethnography exhibit of the County Museum.

Eight historical monuments classified as having national importance exist in Buzău: the church of the Birth of Christ (1649, also known colloquially as the "Greeks' church" or the "Merchants' church") along with its belfry; the courthouse (20th century); the church of the Annunciation from the former Banu monastery (16th century); the church of the Dormition in Broșteni district, (1709, along with the belfry erected in 1914); the headquarters of the orthodox bishopric with the church of the Dormition (1649), the chapel (1841), the episcopal palace (17th century), the old seminary (1838), the chancellery (19th century), gate belfry and the compound wall (18th century); the Vergu-Mănăilă mansion (18th century, which currently hosts the ethnography exhibit of the County Museum); Vasile Voiculescu County Library (1914); and the Communal Palace (city hall, 1899–1903).

One public forum monument and twelve memorial monuments are included in the list of historical monuments in Buzău County with local importance, including the urban area of Cuza Vodă street (19th century) in the old town, Crâng park, the Albatros Villa (that used to belong to Alexandru Marghiloman) and the park, the Jewish temple, the buildings of B.P. Hasdeu and Mihai Eminescu high-schools, a house where Hortensia Papadat-Bengescu lived for a few years, and some of the tombs in Dumbrava cemetery, such as one that was originally decorated with the statue "Prayer" by Constantin Brâncuși (nowadays replaced by a replica).

== Geography ==
The city is located in the center of the county, 100 km north-east of Bucharest, in the south-east of Romania, taking up a total area of 81.3 km^{2} (31.4 sq mi), at the outermost curvature of the Subcarpathian foothills, at the crossroads of the three main Romanian historical provinces: Wallachia, Transylvania, and Moldavia. It is entirely placed on the right bank of Buzău river, which forms its northern limit. The shape of the city is oblong, longer along the river and shorter across. It reaches altitudes of 101 meters in the north-west, near the foothills, going down to 88 meters on the riverbank, while the average altitude of 95 meters is the same as the altitude of Dacia square, in the city center. Thus, Buzău is placed in a flat area, with a height difference of just 10 meters along a 4-kilometer line.

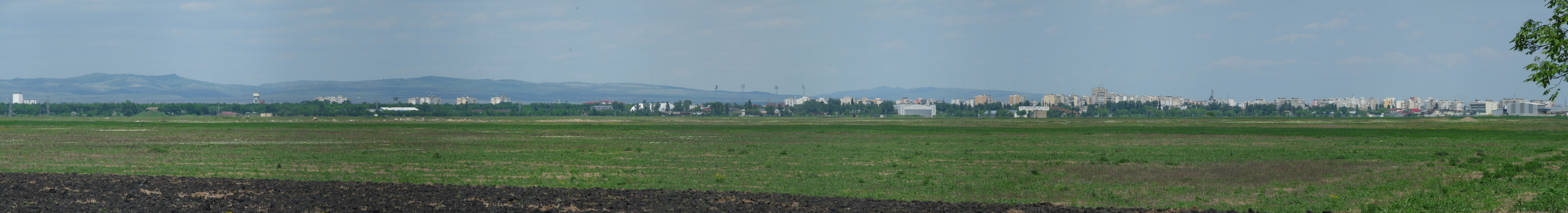
Panoramic view of the west side of Buzău seen from Spătaru, on national road DN2B. The Curvature Subcarpathians are noticeable at the left. Main landmarks seen, starting from the left: the Ursus brewery at the edge of Simileasca district, apartment buildings of Micro 14 district, Crâng park and forest, Ice Magic skating rink, the City Stadium, Micro 12/Independenței district

=== Waterways ===
Buzău river is the northern limit of the city. This river has created an underground basin that it permanently fuels with water. These underground waters are a main source of drinking water, and their excess overflows to a marshy wetland south of the city, in the neighboring communes Costești, Stâlpu, and Țintești, with small but steady springs, that ultimately form the Călmățui river.

=== Climate ===
Annual rainfall is circa 500 mm and in winter the snow cover can be as high as 30 cm. The Buzău River has a fluctuating flow. Especially in spring, when it collects melted snow from the mountain area, its level rises. The city was, however, built away from its deep and wide valley, so the river never floods the city. Even at the major floods of 2005, the waters caused no problem in the city proper, but it seriously damaged both bridges across it located in the city, which is also protected by levees, and by the small Cândești dam, north-west of Buzău. The local authorities consider, however, that their strategy of defense against flood does not adequately cover the city's belt road, part of DN2, which follows the river for a short stretch.

The climate is humid continental, classified as Dfa in Köppen climate classification and as Dc in Trewartha climate classification, with an average 92 freezing days a year (16 with temperatures below −10 °C), but also with 92 days of hot summer. and 25.8 days with snow depth over 1 cm (0.39 in). Local winds include the Crivăț, a cold north-easterly and sometimes easterly wind in winter, and the Austru, a south-westerly wind that brings dry air in summer and leads to warmer days in winter.

Climate data for Buzău, 1991–2020 normals, extremes 1901-present
Month	Jan	Feb	Mar	Apr	May	Jun	Jul	Aug	Sep	Oct	Nov	Dec	Year
Record high °C (°F)	18.9 (66.0)	28 (82)	28 (82)	31.5 (88.7)	37.3 (99.1)	38.5 (101.3)	40.3 (104.5)	39.7 (103.5)	37 (99)	35.3 (95.5)	25 (77)	21.6 (70.9)	40.3 (104.5)
Mean daily maximum °C (°F)	3.3 (37.9)	6.1 (43.0)	11.8 (53.2)	18.1 (64.6)	23.8 (74.8)	27.7 (81.9)	29.9 (85.8)	30.0 (86.0)	24.4 (75.9)	17.6 (63.7)	10.3 (50.5)	4.4 (39.9)	17.3 (63.1)
Daily mean °C (°F)	−0.8 (30.6)	1.2 (34.2)	5.9 (42.6)	11.8 (53.2)	17.5 (63.5)	21.6 (70.9)	23.7 (74.7)	23.4 (74.1)	18.0 (64.4)	11.8 (53.2)	5.8 (42.4)	0.5 (32.9)	11.7 (53.1)
Mean daily minimum °C (°F)	−4.3 (24.3)	−2.7 (27.1)	1.3 (34.3)	6.4 (43.5)	11.7 (53.1)	15.9 (60.6)	17.9 (64.2)	17.8 (64.0)	12.9 (55.2)	7.6 (45.7)	2.3 (36.1)	−2.7 (27.1)	7.0 (44.6)
Record low °C (°F)	−29.6 (−21.3)	−25 (−13)	−17 (1)	−5.3 (22.5)	−2 (28)	4.6 (40.3)	7.5 (45.5)	5.4 (41.7)	−2 (28)	−8 (18)	−17.6 (0.3)	−23.3 (−9.9)	−29.6 (−21.3)
Average precipitation mm (inches)	22.3 (0.88)	18.4 (0.72)	28.0 (1.10)	41.2 (1.62)	64.8 (2.55)	82.1 (3.23)	73.0 (2.87)	47.9 (1.89)	46.7 (1.84)	45.3 (1.78)	31.4 (1.24)	30.2 (1.19)	531.3 (20.92)
Average precipitation days (≥ 1.0 mm)	4.7	3.8	5.0	6.4	8.7	8.7	7.1	5.1	4.7	5.0	4.8	4.9	68.9
Mean monthly sunshine hours	87.8	114.2	158.6	200.1	265.3	280.3	315.9	300.6	221.1	160.7	98.2	78.9	2,281.7
Source 1: NOAA
Source 2: Romanian National Statistic Institute (extremes 1901–2000), (extremes 2001–present)

=== Flora and fauna ===
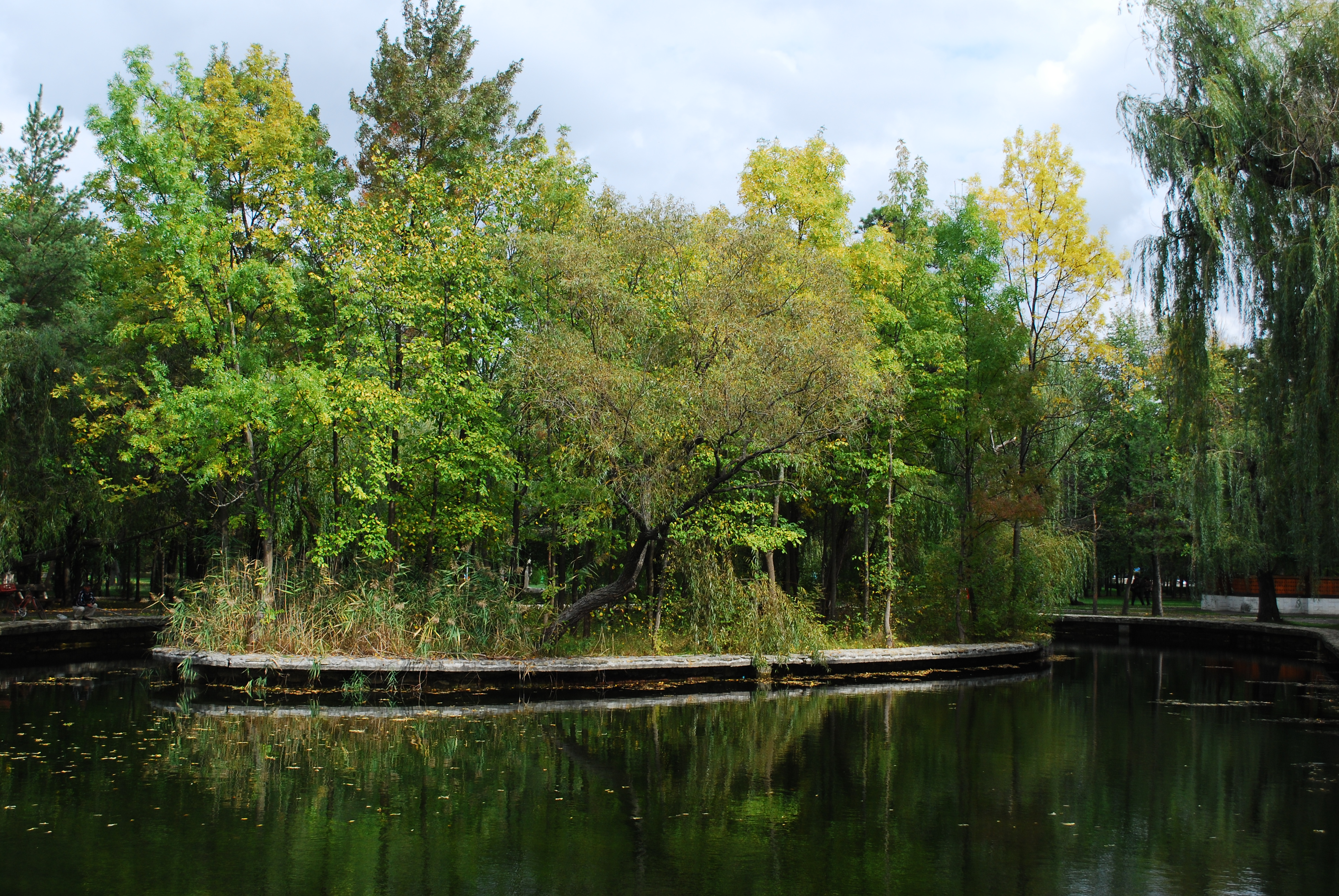
Crâng park, the main green area

The flora of Buzău is more diverse in the western forest of Crâng, 189 ha of oak forest, a remainder of the ancient Codrii Vlăsiei. The Crâng park itself takes up 10 hectares of this forest and makes up the main green area of Buzău. It is not designated as a protected area itself, but a few species of plants are protected inside it, such as the fritillaria meleagris and iris brandzae. In the neighboring communes of Țintești and Costești there are other remainders of Codrii Vlăsiei— Frasinu and Spătaru forests, respectively. In the yard of the building at the intersection of Crizantemelor and Tudor Vladimirescu streets, across the street from the park in front of B. P. Hasdeu high school and the Banu church, there is a century-old oak, locally protected as a monument of nature. 6% of the Lunca Buzăului protected area, a Natura 2000 site managed by the Ecological University of Bucharest, lies within city limits, in the north and east.

Most of the streets in Buzău have trees planted alongside, chestnut on Nicolae Bălcescu boulevard and linden on Unirii boulevard. In their gardens, the locals grow roses, hyacinths, tulips, local peonies, and petunia, as well as grapevines and Virginia creepers for shade. The wild fauna in Buzău is made up of city-dwelling species. The house sparrow and the collared dove are ubiquitous, and the most present small mammals are the wild polecat and the brown rat. Lakes are populated with small fish, such as bitterlings and eel, as well as snails and green lizards.

During the migration season, a parliament of short-eared owls has made a habit of spending a few days in some tall fir trees located in the yard of the Forestry Inspector's Office in the city center. Experimental crops from the city's Research and Development Station for Olericulture sometimes attract wild boars from the riverside forests.

== Demographics ==
Ethnic composition of Buzău
1. Romanians (88.4%)
2. Roma (4.73%)
3. Unknown (6.69%)
4. Others (0.14%)
Religious composition of Buzău
1. Orthodox Christians (92.0%)
2. Unknown (6.74%)
3. Other religions (1.27%)

According to the 2011 census, the city has 115,494 inhabitants, a decrease from the previous census, in 2002, when 134,227 had been recorded. Most inhabitants are Romanians (88.43%), with a Roma minority (4.73%). Ethnic affiliation is unknown for 6.69% of the population. Most inhabitants practice Orthodox Christianity (91.98%). Religious affiliation is unknown for 6.75% of the population.

=== Ethnic communities ===
The main ethnic minority in the city are the Roma. Throughout history, other communities have existed in Buzău, but nowadays they are nearly extinct. Those that left their mark the most on the city were the Jewish people and the Bulgarians.

==== Roma ====
Settled after the 16th century by the Orthodox bishopric on its estate located north-west of the market town of Buzău, in Simileasca and Iorguleasca villages, Roma people have lived as slaves who worked on the bishopric's land. After they were freed in the 19th century and, with the union between Wallachia and Moldavia, the new country got a new territorial division, Simileasca became a commune. In 1968, this commune was dissolved and integrated with Buzău. The Roma community is still located mostly in this part of the city, and it preserves its identity, although its leaders believe that Roma people in other parts of the city, who no longer speak their people's language, accept assimilation by the majority Romanians, and declare themselves Romanian at the census. The community is faced with endemic poverty, high illiteracy, lack of professional qualifications and high school dropout rates, which all expose it to permanently being manipulated by politicians for elections. Many Roma people went abroad, especially in the countries of Northern Europe. The municipality also runs programs to improve theirs status, and School no. 14, located in Simileasca, is the main focus of these actions. Pupils of this school publish a bilingual school newspaper, in Romani and Romanian, which promotes Roma integration into society.

==== Jews ====
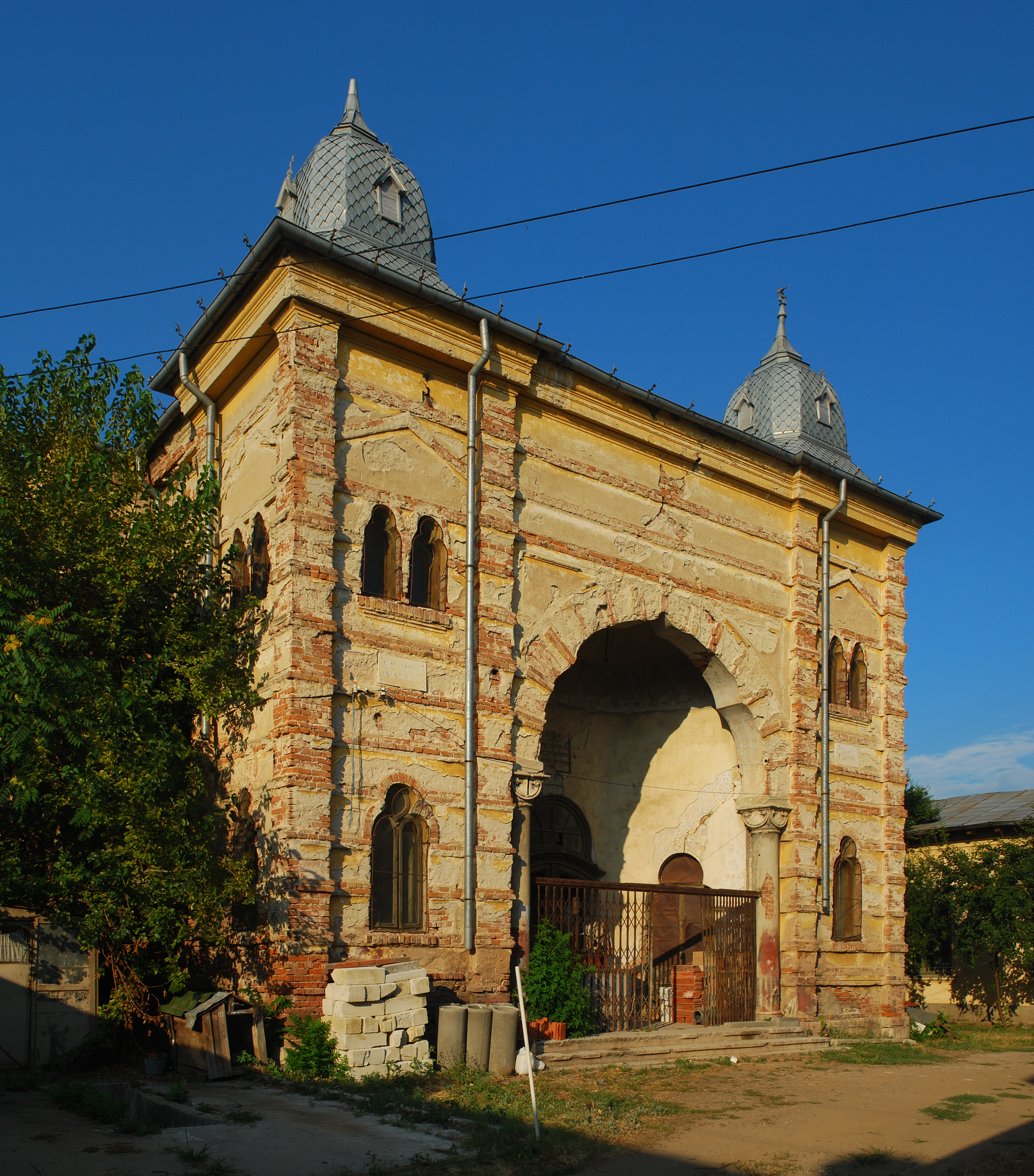
The Jewish synagogue in Buzău

Although mentioned in documents as early as the 16th century, the Jews of Buzău became an especially important community starting with the cultural and economical development period of the 19th century. A large proportion of them were merchants and craftsmen. The Jewish cemetery appeared in 1853 and a temple dates from 1885. Between the two World Wars, 10% of the population of Buzău was Jewish, a large percentage compared to other cities in Wallachia, but significantly smaller than those in Moldavia, which saved the community from the brunt of the repression by Antonescu's government. Still, during World War II, the Jews had to endure some persecutions: obligated to do compulsory work (authorities abused of the law, and extended the age of the people who had to do this work, as well as the body of the work itself), and to pay 15 million lei (four times the tax) for "The Reunification Loan"; certain types of objects were confiscated from them and special restrictions were imposed. The community had to host orphans whose parents were murdered in the Holocaust, before they were deported to Transnistria. During these persecutions, the Jewish community was defended by captains Stroie and Ionescu, by the Scânteie and Stahu families, and by Anghel Anuțoiu from Vrancea, a man who informed members of the community of upcoming Nazi raids, saving many lives, including that of Rabbi Simon Bercovich, whom he aided to leave the city and go into hiding. After the war, most Jews of the city moved to Israel, and left behind a Jewish community of only a few tens of people. Some of the personalities of the Jewish community in Buzău were painter Margareta Sterian and philosopher Ludwig Grunberg.

==== Bulgarians ("Serbs") ====
In the 18th century, to avoid Ottoman repression against Christians in the Balkans, groups of Bulgarians settled in Wallachia where they enjoyed freedom to practice Christianity; some of these groups came to Buzău. The locals called them "Serbs" as a generic term for South-Slavs. The new immigrants soon started developing vegetable gardens as their houses were in the vicinity of the river that provided them with plenty of water, while local farmers were focusing more on raising livestock and growing cereals. Although the Bulgarian community was in time assimilated by the Romanians, to this day locals use the word "Serb" as a synonym to "one who grows vegetables".

== Government ==
Buzău is administered by a mayor and a local council consisting of 23 councillors. The mayor, Constantin Toma, of the Social Democratic Party (PSD), has been in office since 2016. After the 2020 local elections, the local council has the following political makeup:

Party	Seats	Current Council
Social Democratic Party (PSD)	16	
National Liberal Party (PNL)	3	
People's Movement Party (PMP)	2	
Save Romania Union (USR)	2	

Buzău is not subdivided into any lower units, but local authorities guide their projects and strategies according to an informal division by districts. In Strategia 2014–2020, a strategical document of the mayor's office, the following districts of Buzău were identified: Center, Micro 12/Indepenedenței, Marghiloman, Dorobanți, Nicolae Bălcescu, Simileasca, Micro 14, Poștă, Mihai Viteazul, Pod Horticolei, Luceafărul, Broșteni and the Industrial Zone.

Buzău takes on the administrative role of capital of Buzău County, therefore almost all county-level public services are headquartered there. Additionally, at national level, Buzău is the headquarters of the 2nd Infantry Division (Getica; former 2nd Romanian Army), one of the three divisions that make up the Romanian Land Forces, as well as three battalions under its command— one of engineers, one of signals, and one of logistics. Near the city, in the village of Boboc, there is a military aviation school.

The highest court functioning in the city is the Buzău Tribunal, with authority over the entire county. The jurisdiction of the Tribunal covers all the four local courts (judecătorii) in the county, of which Buzău Local Court is in the city and takes cases related to Buzău and 34 surrounding communes, the largest jurisdiction of the four. The higher court to all these is the Court of Appeals in Ploiești.

In the Romanian Parliament, Buzău elects deputies on the lists associated with Buzău County. Of the seven deputies elected in 2016 on these lists, six (social democrats Marcel Ciolacu, Ionela Viorela Dobrică, Sorin Lazăr, Dănuț Păle, Nicolaie-Sebastian-Valentin Radu; and Adrian Mocanu from the People's Movement Party) have their office in Buzău, while only the liberal Cristinel Romanescu has his in Râmnicu Sărat.

In the late 19th century, local statesman Alexandru Marghiloman, owner of a large estate and a mansion near the city, became prominent. Germanofile, Marghiloman was prime minister around the end of World War I, when Romania was compelled to sign the Treaty of Bucharest of 1918 and began the process of integrating Bessarabia, which had proclaimed its union with Romania in mid-April of that year. Another known contemporary politician from Buzău is Cătălin Predoiu; initially, an independent Minister of Justice in the government of Călin Popescu-Tăriceanu, Predoiu became a member of the National Liberal Party (PNL), after which he quit in 2008 to continue as minister, and in 2013 has attempted to obtain the presidential nomination of the Democratic Liberal Party (PDL) for the next year's election; eventually, that party merged with the PNL, who nominated Klaus Iohannis, and Predoiu became shadow prime-minister.

== Economy ==
=== Economic history ===
During the Middle Ages, Buzău's economy was based on trade, as the market town began as a customs and exchange point, and developed due to its position at the curvature of the Carpathians, in a place where roads that connected Wallachia to Moldavia and Transylvania met. The old market town tradition is still preserved in the Drăgaica fair, held every June around Midsummer, bringing together small producers and merchants from diverse regions of Romania.

The agricultural reform during Alexandru Ioan Cuza led some of the Bulgarian gardeners to rent in 1897 și 1898 some land acquired by the state from the bishopric. The developed a distribution network for their produce both in Buzău, and in other nearby cities such as Brașov, Ploiești, or Râmnicu Sărat. Their activity became even more lucrative after the land reform of 1921.

After the period of repeated invasions and destruction ended in the 19th century, the economy began to industrialize as well. Towards the end of that century, the development of a Romanian railway network made Buzău one of its important hubs and pushed the small craftsmen's shops to evolve into industrial installations. The first such facility was the Garoflid mill, open in 1883, that worked also as a cloth factory. În 1894, an oil refinery of the Saturn society was built; this refinery was to function for 50 years.

After a dramatic nationwide decrease caused by the First World War (the 1919 output was a quarter of the one in 1913), the industrial development picked up steam during the interbellum. One of the main components of the local industry was milling. The first industrial mill in the city, Garoflid, renamed Zangopol after its new owner, had reached a capital of 5 million lei in 1928 and, 30 de million in 1938, while the company that operated it had around 100 employees. Another business started at this time was Metalurgica și Turnătorie – S.A. (Metallurgy and Foundry), founded in 1928 with a capital of over 9 million lei. Although it had an initially difficult period, as it was closed during the Great Depression, it was reopened in 1933, only to be closed again in 1940 and 1944, during World War II.

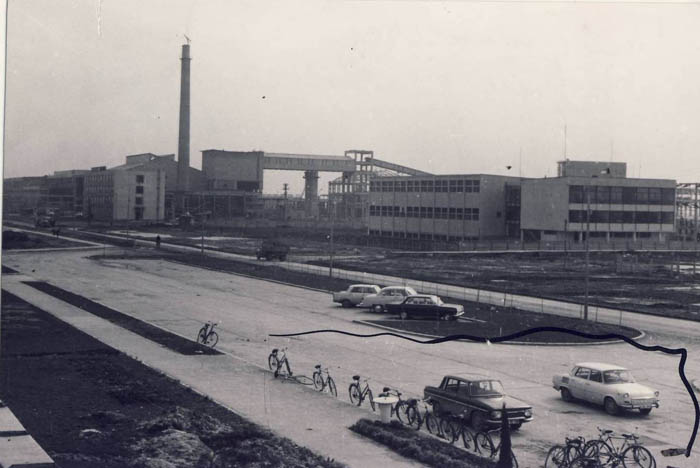
Buzău window factory in 1970

After World War II, on 11 June 1948 all factories were requisitioned by the Communist government, who also began a program of forced industrialization, even though some of the industries that were being developed were unfit to the region. In 1965, the 318 ha Buzău South industrial platform began to be built around the old location of the Saturn refinery, blown up during the war. It was the location of the city's most important factories that were developed at the time: the Steel Wire and Steel Wire Products Enterprise (after 1990, Ductil), the Railway Machinery Enterprise (after 1990, Apcarom), Metalurgica (the one founded in 1928), the Glass and Windows Factory (after 1991, Gerom S.A.).

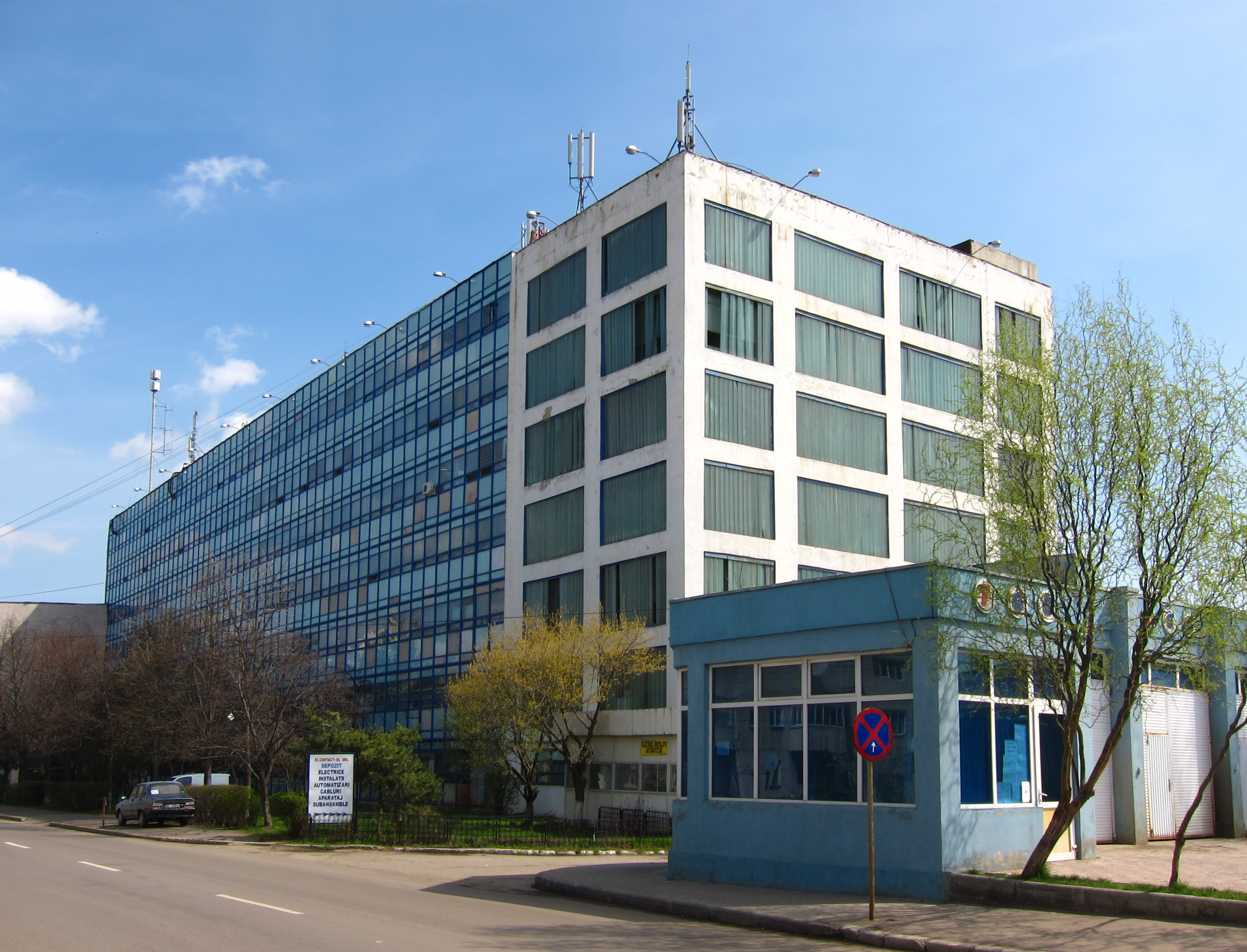
The "Contactoare" electrical relays factory in Buzău

Other facilities were located in other parts of the city, such as the Contactors Enterprise, in the north-east, and the Plastic Works (after 1990, Romcarbon S.A.) in the north.

Despite the forced industrialization, Buzău was spared from becoming dependent on a single industry, and there was no single point of failure for the city's economy. According to the new law of commerce of 1990, that came after the fall of Communism, these factories were organised as state-owned companies, and were privatised. Most of them survived the transition to a market economy, as many of them thus became viable.

=== Present economy ===
Currently, the largest Buzău-based company is Romet, a holding company made up of multiple firms that produse isolation materials for water and gas pipes, water filters, fire extinguishers and other related products. It was successful in the 1990s, with the Aquator home water purifier. In 1999, it also acquired Aromet S.A., the company that operated the 1928 Metalurgica factory.

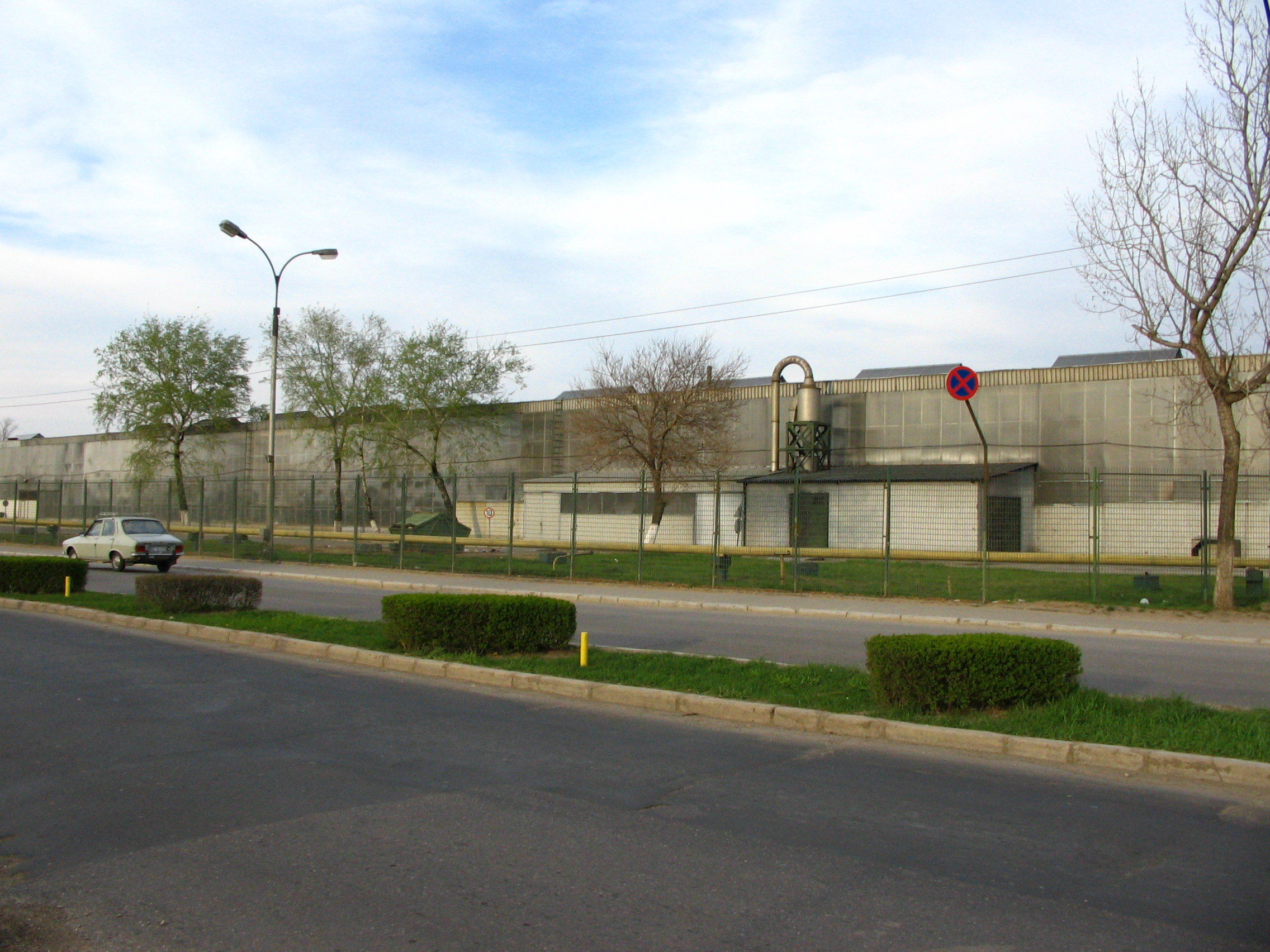
Ductil steel wire factory

Other Buzău-based companies were privatised by programs supervised by the World Bank. Apcarom S.A., the only Romanian producer of railway equipments, was acquired by the Austrian company VAE, and in 2008 had a capital of 7.38 million lei. Ductil S.A., one of the largest companies in the city, was privatised in 1999 and divided subsequently, during 1999–2000 by the new majority shareholder, FRO Spa, who only kept the electrodes and welding equipment facilities, and sold out the others. The steel wire, welded metal net, concrete and iron works became Ductil Steel S.A. and passed to the Italian company Sidersipe. The iron powder works became Ductil Iron Powder. In 2007, FRO Spa sold Ductil S.A. to the Russian company Mechel, for 90 million euro. Zahărul S.A., the town's sugar producer, was acquired by Agrana România, an Austrian-based group that also owned other sugar factories in Roman, a starch factory in Țăndărei and a juice facility in Vaslui.

Milling is still present on the local market: the largest local producer is Boromir Prod, controlled by businessman Constantin Boromiz, owner of the Boromir group, who also owns Boromir Ind Vâlcea, Panmed Mediaș and Comcereal Sibiu.

The economy is still more oriented towards industry rather than services, which, according to a 2016 survey of the World Bank, made it more attractive to the labor force of lower qualification (at best with a high school degree). The same survey showed that most of the labor force in the city came from within the county, as Buzău is the center of a highly rural, compact and densely populated area. The city was found to be in competition with larger cities for the labor force from other counties, a feature it shares with Alexandria. The proximity of Bucharest makes Buzău itself a source of internal migration, thus orbiting the capital city. Buzău is the second city (closely after Ploiești, a city with almost double the population), by the number of employees in Bucharest coming from other cities between 1991 and 2011; the survey points out that this has been a disadvantage, but might become an opportunity in the future.

== Transport ==
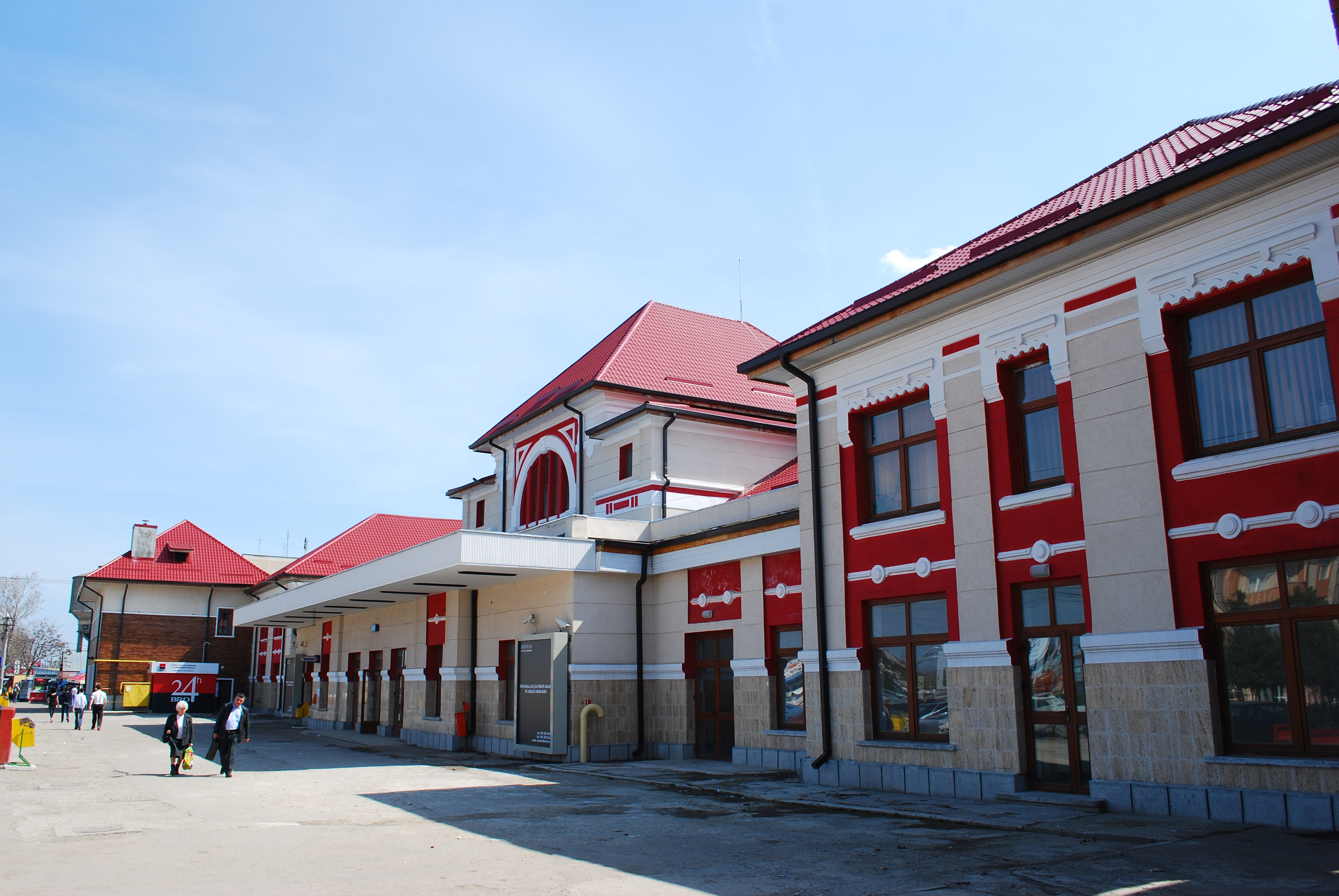
The main railway station in Buzău

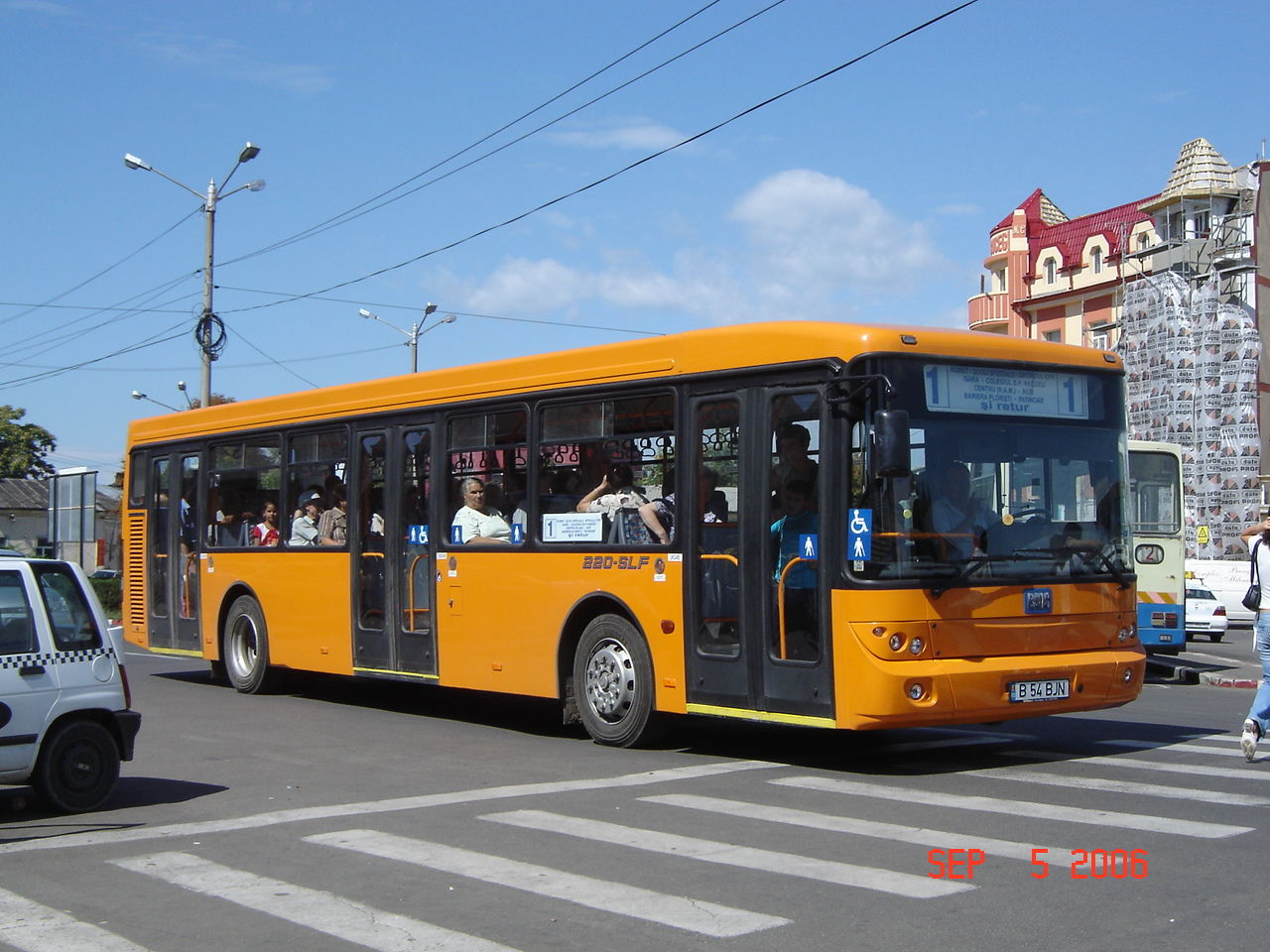
An old city bus on route 1, near the Buzău railway station

=== Rail ===
Buzău is one of the main hubs of Romanian Railways, as it connects Muntenia with Western Moldavia. The city railway station was open in 1872, along with the Bucharest-Galați railway.

A branch of this railway, from Buzău to Mărășești was opened a few years later, on 13 June 1881, and it was the first railway designed by Romanian engineers.

The Buzău-Nehoiașu line, open in 1908, connects Buzău to the smaller towns and villages along the Buzău River valley, including Nehoiu and Pătârlagele.

=== Road ===
Buzău is crossed by A7 motorway, which connects the city to Ploiești to the south and to Râmnicu Sărat and the main cities of Western Moldavia to the north. Along the highway runs national road DN2 (part of European route E85), which connects the same cities, except for the south end extension in Bucharest. The highway has 3 exits locates near the city: one near the Vadu Pașii commune, one on national road DN2B and one near the intersection between DN2 and DN1B. National road DN1B (European Route E577) branches out of DN2 in Buzău. This road connects the city to Ploiești. In the north of the city, DN10 also branches from DN2. It crosses the Carpathians at their south-eastern curvature through Buzău Pass towards Brașov. The south of Buzău is also crossed by national road DN2B, which branches from DN2 în the neighboring commune of Costești, leading eastward to Galați and Brăila. In Buzău, county road DJ203D branches from DN2B. It leads south to Țintești and Smeeni, where it ends in DN2C, a road along which it helps connect Buzău to Slobozia.

In the Buzău city area, there are two bridges over Buzău River: the one crossing with DN2 to Mărăcineni, and the one connecting the city to Vadu Pașii, near the railway bridge. The latter one was however closed after it was destroyed by a flash flood in 2005, and repairs kept being postponed, which had an impact on the economy of the neighboring communes in the north-east of the city, as it remains used only by pedestrians and cyclists. Works began in the fall of 2017. The bridge was renovated and opened for cars and buses again in 2021.

Two main bust stations, one in the north, near the mall, and one in the south next to the railway station, as well a few other secondary bus stops, are used by private transportation companies that operate services to other cities or nearby villages.

=== Air ===
Buzău has no civil airport. The only air transport infrastructure present in the city is the military airport and heliport south-west of the city, but it is used only by emergency sanitary flights. Civil air traffic for Buzău is performed through Henri Coandă International Airport in Otopeni, 110 km away, the main air hub for Wallachia.

=== Public transportation ===
Buzău's only public transportation mean of transport is bus, operated by Transbus Buzău. There are:

- 8 municipial lines, connecting residential places to commercial ones;
- 18 rural lines, connecting nearby villages to the city, while being less frequent;
- 14 industrial lines, connecting the main city and rural zones to the industrial zone.

There are a few taxi companies licensed by the city also operating in the surrounding villages.

== Education and culture ==
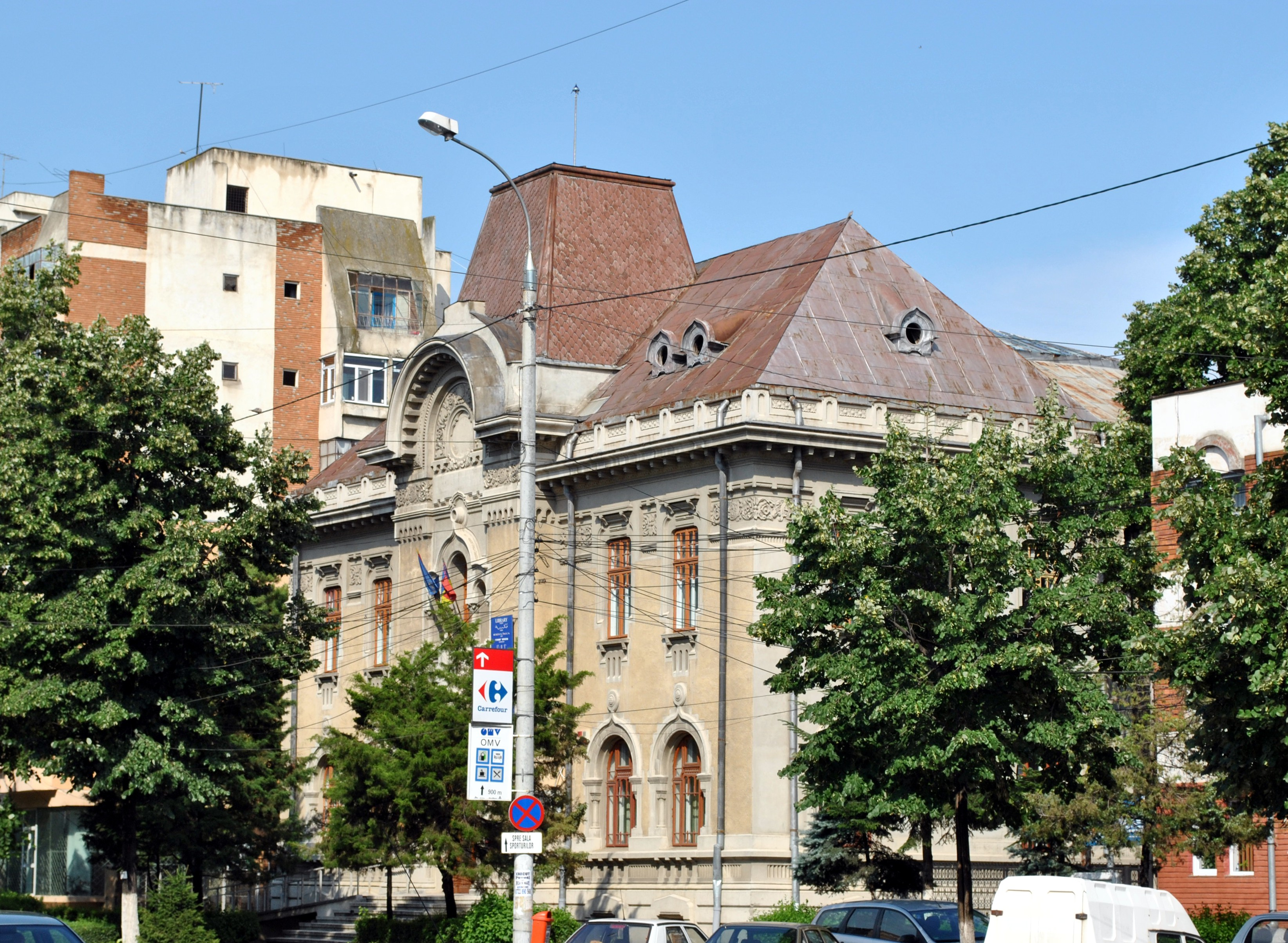
The Vasile Voiculescu memorial county library in Buzău

The first school in Buzău was the school for church and icon painters, opened by Chesarie Căpățână, the bishop of Buzău. The school functioned at the bishopric of Buzău, and was managed by Nicolae Teodorescu. Gheorghe Tattarescu started learning painting here.

The city's most important educational landmark is the Bogdan Petriceicu Hasdeu National College, attended by the Nobel prize winner George Emil Palade in his youth. The Hasdeu high school was inaugurated in 1867.

The city's public library was opened in 1893, under the name of Carol I Public Library. Later it took the name of Vasile Voiculescu, Buzău's most prominent author, writer, and poet.

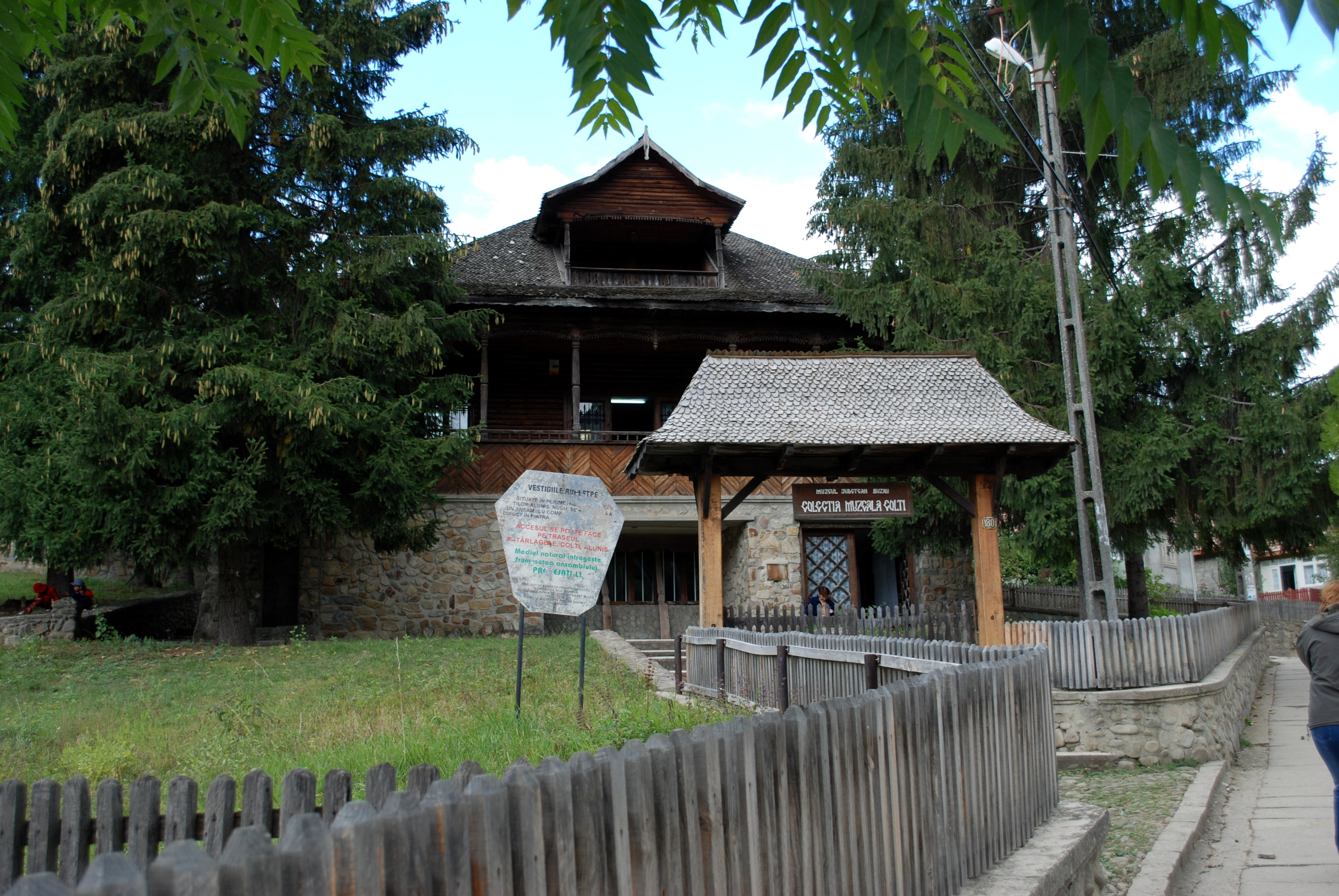
Buzău County Museum

The George Ciprian stage theatre was created in 1996. It does not have an acting crew of its own, relying on contracts. Its first manager was playwright Paul Ioachim.

The first university in the city was the Economic University College, inaugurated in 1992, a branch of the Academy of Economic Studies in Bucharest.

The main museum in Buzău is the Buzău County Museum, which exhibits items related to the region's history. The same museum oversees the ethnography exhibition at the Vergu-Mănăilă House, as well as the Amber Museum in Colți and the Vasile Voiculescu Memorial House in Pârscov.

== Coat of Arms ==
Coat of arms of Buzău
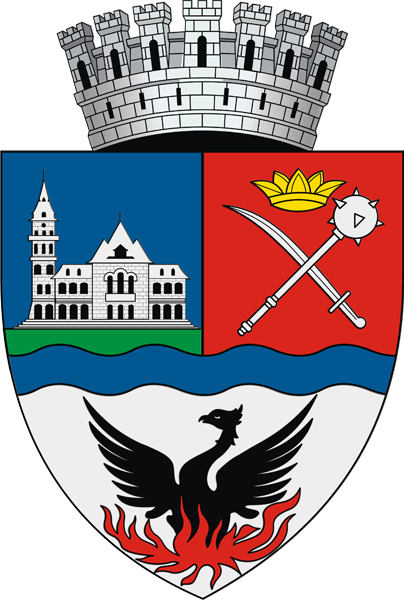
- Armiger: City Government
- Crest: A mural crown of seven towers
- Supporters: None
- Motto: None
- Use: On the City hall's and Local Council's documents

The coat of arms of Buzău is the heraldic symbol standing for the city of Buzău, Romania. The city's first recorded coat of arms dates back to 1831, and since then, the coat of arms has mostly kept its features, under different designs.

=== Description and symbolism ===
The shield is parted by a wavy azure fess. The upper half further parted per pale. In the right quarter, on azure, there is the image of the city's Communal Palace standing on a vert terrace. In the left corner, on gules, a mace and a sword, argent, crossed, with an or crown on top. The lower half shows, on argent, a Phoenix bird, sable, rising from a gules bonfire.

The bludgeon and sword stand for the battles that have taken place around the city, throughout history, and the Phoenix (symbol of rebirth) symbolizes the repeated reconstruction undergone by Buzău during the early modern times, as the city was destroyed by war and natural disasters, and depopulated by epidemics.

The shield is topped by a mural crown with seven towers, which shows the city's status as a county seat.

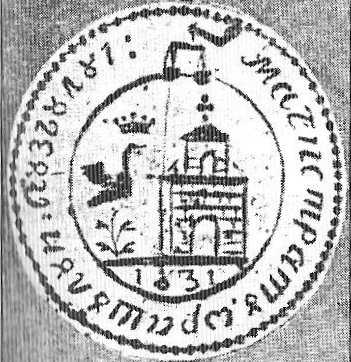
The first recorded coat of arms of Buzău, 1831

=== History ===
The first seal of Buzău dates back to the year 1831 and shows a Phoenix bird and a church. The church stood for the bishopric based in Buzău, while the Phoenix bird stood for the periods of destruction and subsequent reconstruction that the city had recently undergone.

The Communal Palace, inaugurated in 1901, became a symbol of the city and eventually made its way on the official coat of arms. Thus, the inter-war coat of arms of Buzău is similar to the present one, except for the mural crown which only had five towers, and a golden border on the shield.

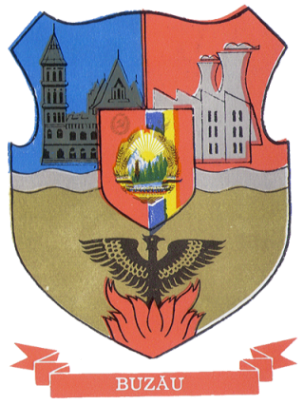
Coat of arms of Buzău, 1970-1989

After World War II, no symbol was used until 1970, when the communist government adopted a set of new insignia for the Romanian cities. The 1970 coat of arms was divided party per fess, with an inescutcheon divided party per pale and charged with the crest of Communist Romania (hammer and sickle symbol of the Romanian Communist Party on red, dexter; flag of Romania, sinister). The upper half was divided party per pale, azure and gules, with an argent Communal Palace on the right quarter, and industrial towers on the left quarter. The lower half retained the sable Phoenix rising from the gules bonfire, which had, by then, become the main symbol of Buzău.

After the Romanian Revolution of 1989, the Communist symbol was abolished and, again, the city was left without a coat of arms until 2006, when the present coat of arms was approved by the Romanian government.

== People from Buzău ==
- Gabriel Andreescu, human rights activist and political scientist
- Ion Băieșu, playwright
- Georges Banu, writer, theatre critic, and academic
- Constantin Budeanu, electrical engineer
- Gabriel Burtănete, gymnast
- Vasile Cârlova, poet
- Marcel Ciolacu, politician
- George Ciprian, actor, playwright
- Vasile Silvian Ciupercă, politician
- Gheorghe Covaciu, handball player
- Constantin C. Giurescu, historian
- Ștefan Gușă, Romanian Army general
- Paul Ioachim, actor, playwright
- Mico Kaufman, sculptor
- Alexandru Marghiloman, statesman, Prime Minister of Romania
- Velimir Maximilian, actor
- Cătălin Predoiu, politician
- Dan Puric, actor and theatre director
- Mihaela Runceanu, pop singer
- DJ Sava, electronic musician, DJ, and record producer
- George Șerban, journalist, politician, and writer
- Ion-Aurel Stanciu, Air Force general
- Constantin T. Stoika, poet and prose writer
- Elena Udrea, politician
- Andrei Ursu, singer, songwriter, and dancer
- Radu G. Vlădescu, professor at the University of Agronomical Sciences and Veterinary Medicine
- Ștefan Vencov, physicist and rector of Politehnica University
- Vasile Voiculescu, poet, writer, playwright

=== Prominent mayors ===
- Nicu Constantinescu
- Stan Săraru

== Twin towns – sister cities ==
Buzău is twinned with:

- Oudenaarde, Belgium, since 1999
- Agios Dimitrios, Greece, since 2006
- Soroca, Moldova, since 2012
- Ialoveni, Moldova, since 2022
- Strășeni, Moldova, since 2022
