= Nicu Constantinescu =

Romanian politician

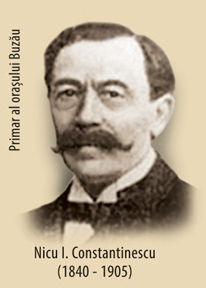

Personal details
- Born: 1840; Craiova, Romania
- Died: 21 April 1905

Nicu Constantinescu (1840–1905) was a Romanian liberal politician, mayor of the city of Buzău, in the late 19th century and early 20th century. He is credited for much of the modern urban development of the city.

He held the office of mayor in five separate terms: 1883–1886, 1889–1890, 1890–1892, 1895–1899 and 1901–1905. He initiated a project to build the Communal Palace, present-day city hall of Buzău, as well as a new courthouse building. The palace was finished in 1903. Constantinescu ordered, also, improvements to be made on the Crâng park, a large park carved in a forest at the outskirts of the city. The Nicolae Bălcescu Boulevard, constructed at the same time, connects the Communal palace in the city center to the Crâng park.
