= Odaia =

Odaia may refer to several places in Moldova:

- Odaia, a village in Şişcani Commune, Nisporeni district
- Odaia, a village in Alcedar Commune, Şoldăneşti district

and in Romania:

- Odaia Banului, a village in Țintești Commune, Buzău County
- Odaia Turcului, a village in Mătăsaru Commune, Dâmboviţa County
- Odaia Manolache, a village in Vânători Commune, Galați County
- Odaia Bogdana, a village in Fălciu Commune, Vaslui County
- Odaia Bursucani, a village in Grivița Commune, Vaslui County
