= Vlădești =

Vlădeşti may refer to:

- Vlădești, Argeș, a commune in Argeș County, Romania
- Vlădești, Galați, a commune in Galați County, Romania
- Vlădești, Vâlcea, a commune in Vâlcea County, Romania
- Vlădeşti, a village in Râmeț Commune, Alba County, Romania
- Vlădeşti, a village in Tigveni Commune, Argeș County, Romania
- Vlădeşti, a village in Bogdăneşti Commune, Vaslui County, Romania

== See also ==
- Vlădescu
