= Eminescu (disambiguation) =

Mihai Eminescu was a Romanian poet.

Eminescu may also refer to:

- 9495 Eminescu, an asteroid named after Mihai Eminescu
- Eminescu (crater), a crater on Mercury named after Mihai Eminescu

== See also ==
- Mihai Eminescu Statue, Montreal
- Mihai Eminescu commune, Botoşani County, Romania
- Mihai Eminescu, a village in Gorbănești Commune, Botoşani County, Romania
- Mihai Eminescu National College (disambiguation)
