= Iosif Constantin Drăgan =

Romanian-Italian businessman, writer and historian (1917 - 2008)

Iosif Constantin Drăgan (Romanian pronunciation: [ˈjosif konstanˈtin drəˈɡan]; June 20, 1917 – August 21, 2008) was a Romanian and Italian businessman, writer, historian and founder of the ButanGas company. In 2005, he was the second-wealthiest Romanian, according to the Romanian financial magazine Capital, having a wealth estimated at $850 million. According to the same financial magazine, in 2006, he became the wealthiest Romanian, at $1.3-1.6 billion.

Drăgan was involved in a series of controversies, including some alleged deals with the Securitate, his admiration for Romanian leader Ion Antonescu, and being one of the main figures in the protochronist current of Romanian historiography.

== Biography ==
=== Early life ===
Born in Lugos, Austria-Hungary (now Lugoj, Romania), Drăgan graduated from Law School at the University of Bucharest in 1938, and earned in 1940 a scholarship at the University of Rome, where he studied political science and economics, earning a Ph.D. in law. At the time, Drăgan was attracted to fascist ideals and the Iron Guard, representing a corporatist trend inside the latter.

Drăgan explained his views on the Fascist Iron Guard in 1940 in the pro-Mussolini newspaper Conquiste d'Impero in two articles entitled "The Mystique of Codreanu's Legionnaires" and "Romanian Corporatism: Pieces of Legionnaire Doctrine". In 1987, based on these articles, the Italian magazine Il Panorama called him "a Legionnaire", but Drăgan sued them and won the trial, as they were not able to bring a proof that he was an actual member of the organization.

=== Business in Italy ===
In 1941, he started a company which exported Romanian petroleum products to Fascist Italy. After World War II, in 1948, he established a gas distribution company in Italy, ButanGas. After the war, with the Romanian Communist Party gaining power in Romania, he was not allowed for 30 years to return to Romania.

=== Protochronism and the relation with Ceaușescu ===
In 1967, he started the "Drăgan European Foundation", which has the goal to promote the "values of the Romanian civilization". He was also the founder of two publishing houses (Nagard in Italy and Europa Nova in Romania), a privately owned university, Universitatea Europeană Drăgan (founded in 1991 in Lugoj), a TV station, a radio station (Radio NovaFm) and a weekly newspaper (Redeșteptarea) and a daily local newspaper (Renașterea Bănățeană), all in Romania. He also funded the Statue of Decebalus, a 40-meter high carving, near Orşova.

He wrote many historical works associated with the protochronism nationalist movement in Romanian history, which was later promoted by Nicolae Ceauşescu's regime. Despite being a sympathiser of the Iron Guard, Drăgan became a semi-official collaborator of Ceaușescu and the Communist regime, and as a result, he had access to some documents never published before on Ion Antonescu, using them in a four-volume book, which put Antonescu, a man who has been sentenced to death for war crimes and executed, in a good light. According to historian Lucian Boia, Drăgan promoted an extreme version of protochronism, which claimed that the Romania was the cradle of civilization, and the Romanian people the oldest in Europe:

As the author of We, the Thracians (1976) and editor of the periodical of the same title (Noi, tracii) that was launched in 1974, he was the leading figure of an entire movement aimed at amplifying the role of the Thracians in European history, a movement supported by all sorts of amateurs (even a lawyers' group!) but also by some less than scrupulous professionals (among them the archaeologists Dumitru Berciu and Ion Horaţiu Crişan). In the periodical Noi, tracii it was possible, for example, to claim that the ancestors of the Romanians lived 100,000 years ago, eloquent proof that the Romanian people is the oldest in the continent, if not in the world. As for the extent of the Thracians' territory, Drăgan generously allows them almost half of Europe, centered, evidently, on the present-day space of Romania.

=== After 1989 ===
After the Romanian Revolution of 1989, it was alleged that he supported financially Eugen Barbu and Corneliu Vadim Tudor to launch their far right România Mare newspaper. Nevertheless, in 2008, Vadim denied that he got any funding from Drăgan. Together with Vadim Tudor, Drăgan was the founder of "Liga Mareșal Ion Antonescu" in 1990, later renamed to "Liga Mareșalilor" following the changes in the Romanian legislation which disallowed the praise of the pro-Nazi dictator.

=== Death ===
Drăgan died on August 21, 2008, at his house in Palma de Mallorca, Spain.

== Private life ==
After his first wife, Teresa Maria Moriglioni, died in 1986, Drăgan married, at the age of 78, Daniela Veronica Gușă, aged 22 at the time, the daughter of Ştefan Guşă, a Romanian Army general involved in the attempted repression of the 1989 revolution who died of cancer in 1994. Together they had three sons.

Mike Fink (b. 1970), who claims to be Drăgan's son, announced, in 2005, that he had not been able to contact his father in the previous three years. Ziua reached the conclusion that Drăgan was being held captive by his younger wife and his business partners. However, he was seen dining in a restaurant only a few days later in Bucharest, together with his wife.

== See also ==
- Capital Top 300 wealthiest men in Romania
