= Krang (disambiguation) =

Krang is a Teenage Mutant Ninja Turtles supervillain.

Krang may also refer to:

- Krang (band), a Dutch band
- Krang (Marvel Comics), a Marvel Comics character
- Krang, a species of bipedal feline warriors in the television series BraveStarr
- The Tar-Aiym Krang from the book of the same name by Alan Dean Foster
- An English word referring to the portions of a whale that remain after the blubber has been removed

== See also ==
- Crang (disambiguation)
