= Vlădescu =

Vlădescu is a Romanian surname. Notable people with the surname include:

- G. M. Vlădescu (1885–1952), writer
- Matei Vlădescu (1835–1901), general
- Mihail Vlădescu (1865–1944), botanist and politician
- Radu G. Vlădescu (1886–1964), academic
- Sebastian Vlădescu (born 1958), economist and politician
- Gheorghe Vlădescu-Răcoasa (1895–1989), sociologist and politician
