= Mihai Eminescu National College =

Mihai Eminescu National College is the name of several schools in Romania:

- Mihai Eminescu National College (Baia Mare), a high school in Baia Mare
- Mihai Eminescu National College (Botoșani), a high school in Botoșani
- Mihai Eminescu National College (Bucharest), a high school in Bucharest
- Mihai Eminescu National College (Buzău), a high school in Buzău
- Mihai Eminescu National College (Constanța), a high school in Constanţa
- Mihai Eminescu National College (Iași), a high school in Iași
- Mihai Eminescu National College (Oradea), a high school in Oradea
- Mihai Eminescu National College (Satu Mare), a high school in Satu Mare
- Mihai Eminescu National College (Suceava), a high school in Suceava
