= Crâng =

Crâng may refer to several villages in Romania:

- Crâng, a village in the town of Pătârlagele, Buzău County
- Crâng, a village in Ciocani Commune, Vaslui County

== See also ==
- Crâng park
