= Vergu-Mănăilă House =

Coordinates: 45°8′56.818″N 26°49′22.922″E

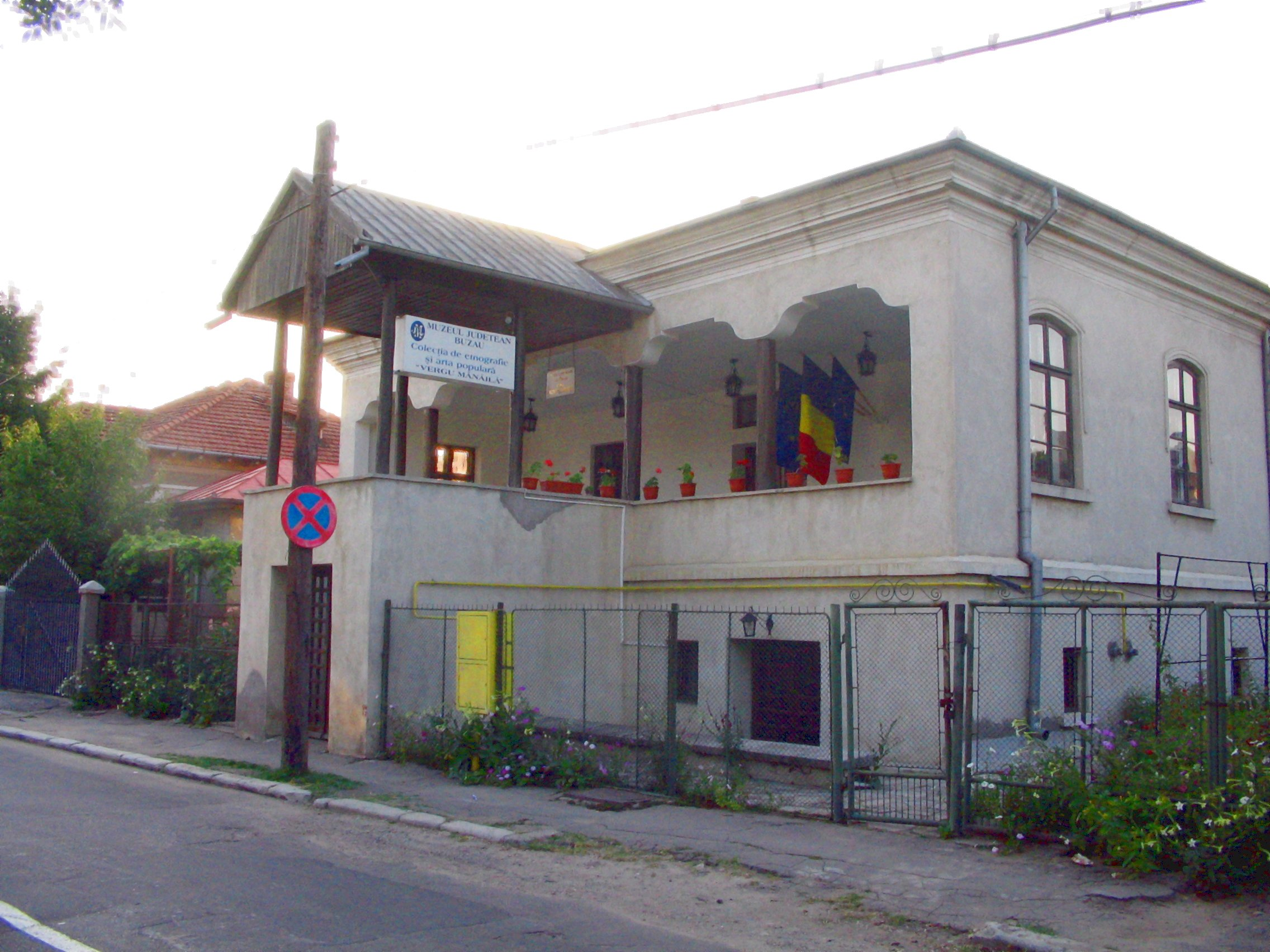
The Vergu-Mănăilă House in Buzău

The Vergu-Mănăilă house is the oldest surviving building in Buzău, Romania. An 18th-century boyar's mansion, renovated between 1971 and 1974, it hosts a museum of ethnography and folk art.
