= Costești, Buzău =

Costești
- Commune
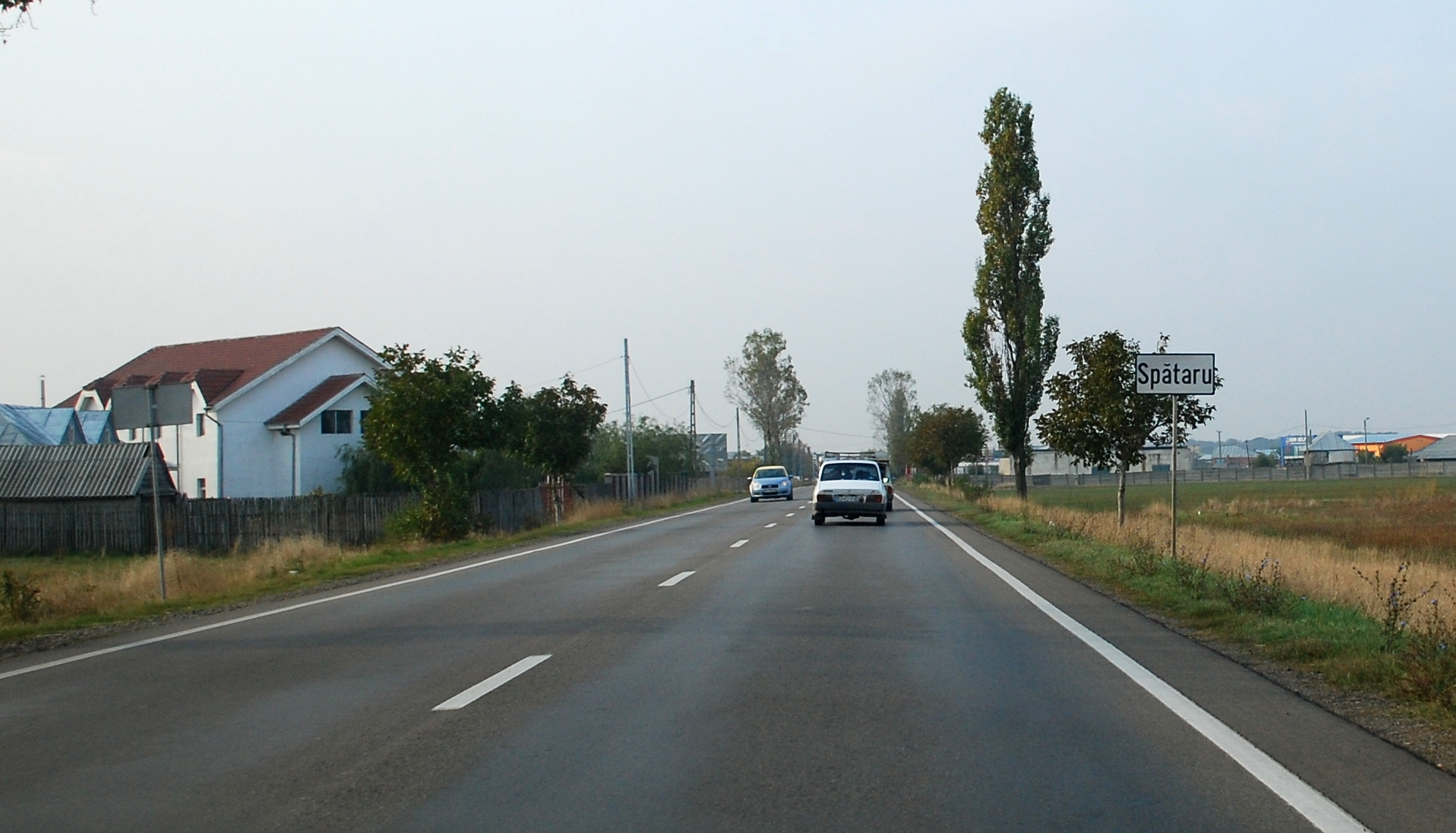
- DN2B entering Spătaru

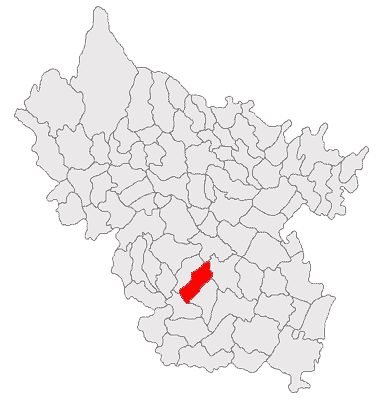
- Location in Buzău County

- Location in Romania
- Coordinates: 45°3′N 26°46′E
- Country: Romania
- County: Buzău
- Subdivisions: Budișteni, Costești, Gomoești, Groșani, Pietrosu, Spătaru

Government
  - Mayor (2020–2024): Nicolae Gioabă (PSD)
- Area: 54.06 km^{2} (20.87 sq mi)
- Elevation: 82 m (269 ft)
- Population (2021-12-01): 4,493
  - Density: 83.11/km^{2} (215.3/sq mi)
- Time zone: UTC+02:00 (EET)
  - Summer (DST): UTC+03:00 (EEST)
- Postal code: 127200–127206
- Area code: +(40) 238
- Vehicle reg.: BZ
- Website: costesti-buzau.ro

Costești (Romanian pronunciation: [kosˈteʃtʲ]) is a commune in the Buzău County, Muntenia, Romania. It is composed of six villages: Budișteni, Costești, Gomoești, Groșani, Pietrosu, and Spătaru.

Historical population
Year	Pop.	±%
2002	4,778	—
2011	4,817	+0.8%
2021	4,493	−6.7%
Source: Census data

== Natives ==
- Ștefan Gușă (1940–1994), general, Chief of the General Staff of the Romanian Armed Forces between 1986 and 1989
