= Ștefan Gușă =

Romanian general

Ștefan Gușă (Gușe)
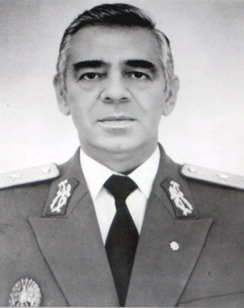

40th Chief of the Romanian General Staff
- In office 25 September 1986 – 28 December 1989
- President: Nicolae Ceaușescu; Ion Iliescu
- Preceded by: Vasile Milea
- Succeeded by: Vasile Ionel

Personal details
- Born: 17 April 1940 Spătaru, Kingdom of Romania
- Died: 28 March 1994 (aged 53) Bucharest, Romania
- Resting place: Spătaru, Buzău County
- Party: Romanian Communist Party; National Salvation Front
- Spouse: Lala
- Children: Ana-Maria, Veronica
- Education: Military Technical Academy
- Profession: Military Officer
- Website: www.fundatiagusa.ro

Military service
- Branch/service: Romanian Land Forces
- Years of service: 1957–1994
- Rank: Lieutenant general
- Commands: 6th Tank Division; 2nd Army

Ștefan Gușă or Gușe (17 April 1940 – 28 March 1994) was a Romanian general who was the Chief of the General Staff of the Romanian Armed Forces between 1986 and 1989.

He was born in Spătaru, a village in Costești commune, Buzău County, and attended the Bogdan Petriceicu Hasdeu High School in the county capital, Buzău. In 1957 he enrolled in the military school for officers in Pitești. He graduated in 1960 first in his class and was promoted to lieutenant, advancing in rank to senior lieutenant in 1963 and captain in 1965. During that period, he joined in 1962 the Romanian Communist Party (PCR, at the time, PMR). From 1966 he attended the Military Technical Academy in Bucharest, advancing to major in 1971, and graduating with an engineering degree in 1972. In September of that year, he was appointed commander of the 6th "Ion Buteanu" Tank Regiment, within the Romanian 3rd Army. Promoted to lieutenant colonel in 1974, he held this command until August 1976, when he was named chief of staff of the 6th "Horia, Cloșca and Crișan" Tank Division. After becoming colonel in 1979, he took command of the division in 1981, and advanced to major general in 1984. On 25 September 1986, he was promoted to the position of First Deputy Minister of National Defense and Chief of the Romanian General Staff.

At the Fourteenth Party Congress of the Communist Party (20–24 November 1989), he became a member of the Central Committee of the PCR, to which he belonged until 22 December of that year. Gușă was a key figure during the Romanian Revolution of December 1989. He was part of the team of generals sent by Nicolae Ceaușescu to Timișoara on 17 December, being present there during the repression from 17–20 December, in which 73 people died. After returning to Bucharest, he appeared many times during those days live on radio and television, asking for a ceasefire. In his capacity as Chief of the General Staff, he refused to ask for the help of Soviet troops or other Warsaw Pact countries to assist the Romanian Army restore order. From 22 to 26 December, he was a member of the Council of the National Salvation Front (FSN). Film director Sergiu Nicolaescu, an active participant in the Revolution and a member of the FSN, alleged in the media that Gușă tried to organize a coup d'état on 23 December, but he could not muster support from the Army. On 28 December, shortly after the execution of Ceaușescu, he was dismissed from his position as Chief of the General Staff and was named chief of staff of the 4th Army, with headquarters in Cluj-Napoca. In January 1990 he was promoted to lieutenant general, and the next month he became Commanding Officer of the 2nd Army, with headquarters in Buzău.

He died in March 1994 of lung cancer at a military hospital in Bucharest (other sources mention bone cancer). Streets in Bacău and Vaslui bear his name.
