= ButanGas =

Liquefied petroleum gas distributor

- Industry: Liquefied petroleum gas distribution
- Founded: 1948; 78 years ago
- Headquarters: Milan, Italy
- Key people: Iosif Constantin Drăgan, founder
- Website: www.butangas.it

ButanGas is an Italian liquefied petroleum gas distributor. The company was founded on 13 December 1948 by Iosif Constantin Drăgan. He moved to Italy in 1940 to study Political and Economic Sciences at the University of Rome after graduating in Law in Bucharest, and realized the great potential of LPG, a little-known product in the post-war period. Since its early years, ButanGas was able to carve out an important role in the LPG market, organizing distribution throughout the country, including the islands, with a network of branches and LPG storage and bottling plants located in strategic regions.

== See also ==
- Official website
