= Mihai Eminescu National College (Buzău) =

High school in Romania

- Colegiul Național "Mihai Eminescu"

Location
- Strada Independenței, nr. 22; Buzău, Buzău County; Romania
- Coordinates: 45.1499°N 26.8192°E

Information
- Type: Public
- Established: 1919
- Director: Iuliana Dobru
- Principal: Dan Dudaș
- Enrollment: app. 1,500
- Information: +40 238 720278
- Website: www.eminescubuzau.ro

Mihai Eminescu National College (Romanian: Colegiul Național "Mihai Eminescu") is a high school located at 22 Independenței Street, Buzău, Romania. It is named after Mihai Eminescu. In 2000, it was granted the title of National College by the Ministry of Education and Research of Romania, being one of the three National Colleges in the city, and four in Buzău County. It is the biggest high school in the Buzau county, and also, considered the best highschool too due to the sheer amount of laboratories it has to offer and teachers that are eager to help students perform in certain domains.It is well known for performances in humanities, and also in chemistry and even IT.
