= Radu Vlădescu =

Romanian professor

Radu Vlădescu (27 April 1886 - 15 February 1964), a Romanian professor born in Buzău, taught at the Faculty of Veterinary Medicine of the University of Agronomical Sciences and Veterinary Medicine, Bucharest. He was a member of the Romanian Academy and correspondent member of the French Academy.
