= DN2B =

Road in Romania

DN2B

Location
- Country: Romania

Highway system
- Roads in Romania; Highways

DN2B is a highway in Romania starting to the east of Galați and ending to the south of Buzău.
