= Drăgan European University of Lugoj =

"Drăgan" European University of Lugoj
- Other name: DEU
- Motto: A university for solid destinies
- Type: Private
- Established: October 1, 1992
- Founders: Professor Iosif Constantin Drăgan, PhD
- Affiliations: European University Association (EUA)
- Rector: Professor Persida Cechin-Crista, PhD
- Location: Lugoj, Timiș County, Romania
- Campus: Urban
- Colors
- Website: www.universitateaeuropeanadragan.ro

"Drăgan" European University of Lugoj (DEU) is an institution of higher education, juridical person of private law and public use, part of the Romanian national system of education, located in Lugoj, Timiș County, Romania.

It was founded through the initiative and the resources of Professor Iosif Constantin Drăgan. The university has had a significant contribution to the revival of Lugoj, an old and traditional cultural center of Banat.

In 2012 the university underwent an external institutional evaluation performed by The Romanian National Council of Academic Evaluation and Accreditation of Higher Education Institutions (ARACIS) and was granted the Certificate of Trust.

The "Drăgan" European University of Lugoj falls under the third classification as "a university largely focused on education" in the Romanian higher education system.

== History ==
"Drăgan" European University of Lugoj, as a modern institution of higher education, was set up on October 1, 1992.

The university is accredited by Law no. 100/ March 21, 2003, published in Official Monitor no. 184/ dated March 25, 2003.

In 2012, ensuing the external institutional evaluation made by ARACIS, the university was granted the Certificate of Trust as proof for the quality of the educational process and maintaining institutional accreditation.

== Campus ==
On April 21, 1993 a stainless steel cylinder was buried at the foundation of the future building of Drăgan European University of Lugoj, containing a message signed by Professor Josif Constantin Drăgan, the founder of the university and by Virgil Turcan, the mayor of Lugoj at that time.

Professor Drăgan said on this occasion: "Today is a historic day, as it is the day in which the first corner stone is laid at the foundation of the new fortress in the city of Lugoj, whose old fortress fell in 1241. 750 years later, we are building a new fortress. Yesterday it was a defense fortress for the people, today it is a defense fortress of the spirit, of our contribution to universal science."

The building was completed in 1996.

The Marble Hall is 644 mp. The university also holds 4 large lecture rooms with 192 seats and 188 mp each, 2 lecture rooms with 58 seats and 64 mp each and one Aula Magna of 470 mp and holding 450 seats, equipped with a simultaneous interpretation system for three languages.

The university also holds 8 seminar rooms with 30 seats and 57 mp each, 2 IT and computing laboratories and 1 forensic laboratory. The semi-basement houses: the book storeroom, the reading room of 124 seating capacity, the students' project room and the students' Press Center.

On March 26, 1997, Professor Drăgan's effigy was set in the entrance hall of the university. This is a large mosaic (2,85 m height x 1,87 m width) carried out by the Italian craftsman Vittorio Venturelli from Pietrasanta. The work of art has been made of Murano mosaic according to the model.

== Faculties ==
Faculty of Economics, with two accredited study programs:

- Finance and Banking (Bachelor Program)
- Financial Management (Master Program)

Faculty of Law, with two accredited study programs:

- Law (Bachelor Program)
- Criminal Investigation Management (Master Program)

== Rectors ==
- 2012 – present: Professor Persida Cechin-Crista, PhD
- 2002 – 2012: Professor Nicu Trandafir, PhD
- 1992 – 2002: Professor Emil Poenaru, PhD

== Scientific research ==
Scientific research has become a strategic development objective, since "Drăgan" European University of Lugoj wishes to be an institution that focuses both on education and on research.

== Academic recognition ==
In 2003 "Drăgan" European University of Lugoj was accredited by Law no. 100/ March 21, 2003, published in Official Monitor no. 184/ dated March 25, 2003, in recognition of the quality of the study programs and the research activity.

== Affiliation and international relations ==
"Drăgan" European University of Lugoj is affiliated to European University Association (EUA).

== See also ==
- List of universities in Romania
