= Sebastian Radu =

Romanian politician (1971–2020)

Member of the Chamber of Deputies of Romania
- In office 2016–2020

Personal details
- Born: 20 February 1971
- Died: 9 December 2020 (aged 49)
- Party: PRM

Nicolaie-Sebastian-Valentin Radu (20 February 1971 – 9 December 2020) was a Romanian politician.

He was a member of the Social Democratic Party and served in the Chamber of Deputies from 2016 to till his death in 2020.

Radu died from COVID-19, at the age of 49, in 2020.
