= Țintești =

- Commune
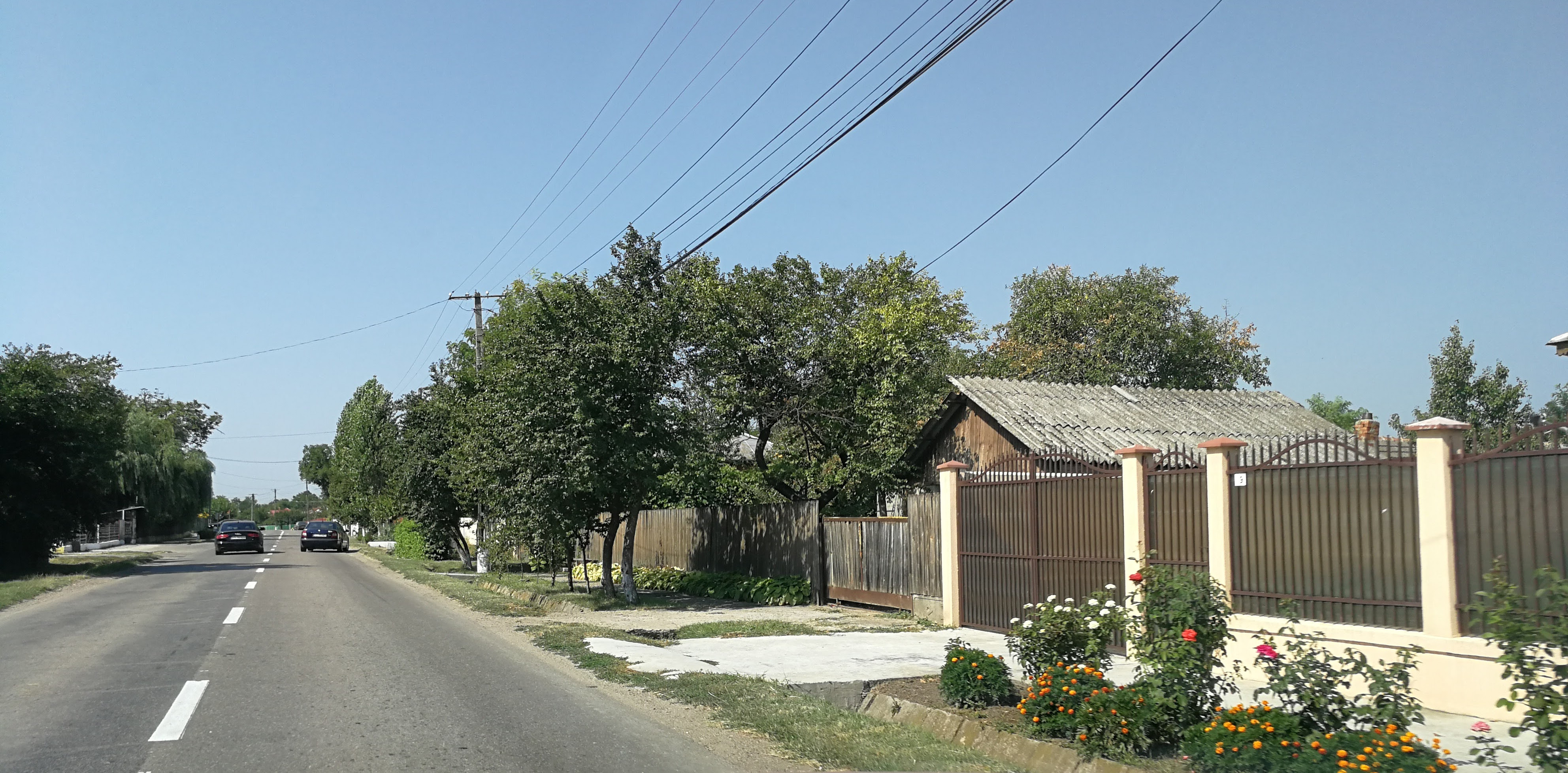
- Maxenu village

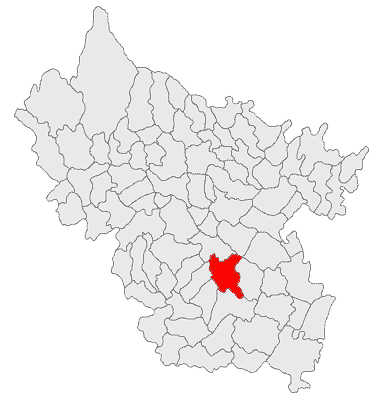
- Location in Buzău County

- Location in Romania
- Coordinates: 45°4′N 26°52′E
- Country: Romania
- County: Buzău
- Subdivisions: Maxenu, Odaia Banului, Pogonele, Țintești

Government
  - Mayor (2020–2024): Aurel Stoica (PSD)
- Area: 72.13 km^{2} (27.85 sq mi)
- Elevation: 74 m (243 ft)
- Population (2021-12-01): 4,197
  - Density: 58.19/km^{2} (150.7/sq mi)
- Time zone: UTC+02:00 (EET)
  - Summer (DST): UTC+03:00 (EEST)
- Postal code: 127640
- Area code: +(40) 238
- Vehicle reg.: BZ
- Website: www.tintesti.ro

Țintești is a commune in Buzău County, Muntenia, Romania. It is composed of four villages: Maxenu, Odaia Banului, Pogonele, and Țintești.

In 2021, there was a proposal to unite Țintești with the city of Buzău. This would be part of the "Buzău Mare 2021" ("Greater Buzău 2021") project, aiming to double Buzău in size and to develop the city more extensively once united with Țintești. This new Buzău would have around 120,000 inhabitants and the planned A7 motorway would go through the middle of it. The idea came from the mayor of Buzău, Constantin Toma. On 26 September 2021, a referendum was done to decide this, and 43.03% of the inhabitants of Țintești voted on it. However, only 10.03% of those of Buzău did so, and given the low turnout, below the legal threshold of 30%, the results were considered null and Țintești and Buzău remained separate.

Historical population
Year	Pop.	±%
2002	4,537	—
2011	4,518	−0.4%
2021	4,197	−7.1%
Source: Census data
