= Military Technical Academy =

Coordinates: 44°25′01″N 26°05′04″E

Military Technical Academy Ferdinand I
- Academia Tehnică Militară "Ferdinand I"
- Established: 15 September 1949; 76 years ago
- Rector: Iulian-Constantin Vizitiu
- Location: Bulevardul George Coșbuc, nr. 39-49, Sector 5, Bucharest, Romania
- Website: mta.ro

The Academia Tehnică Militară Ferdinand I is a public university in Bucharest, Romania, founded in 1949.
