= Crâng park =

Park in Buzău, Romania

Crâng Park
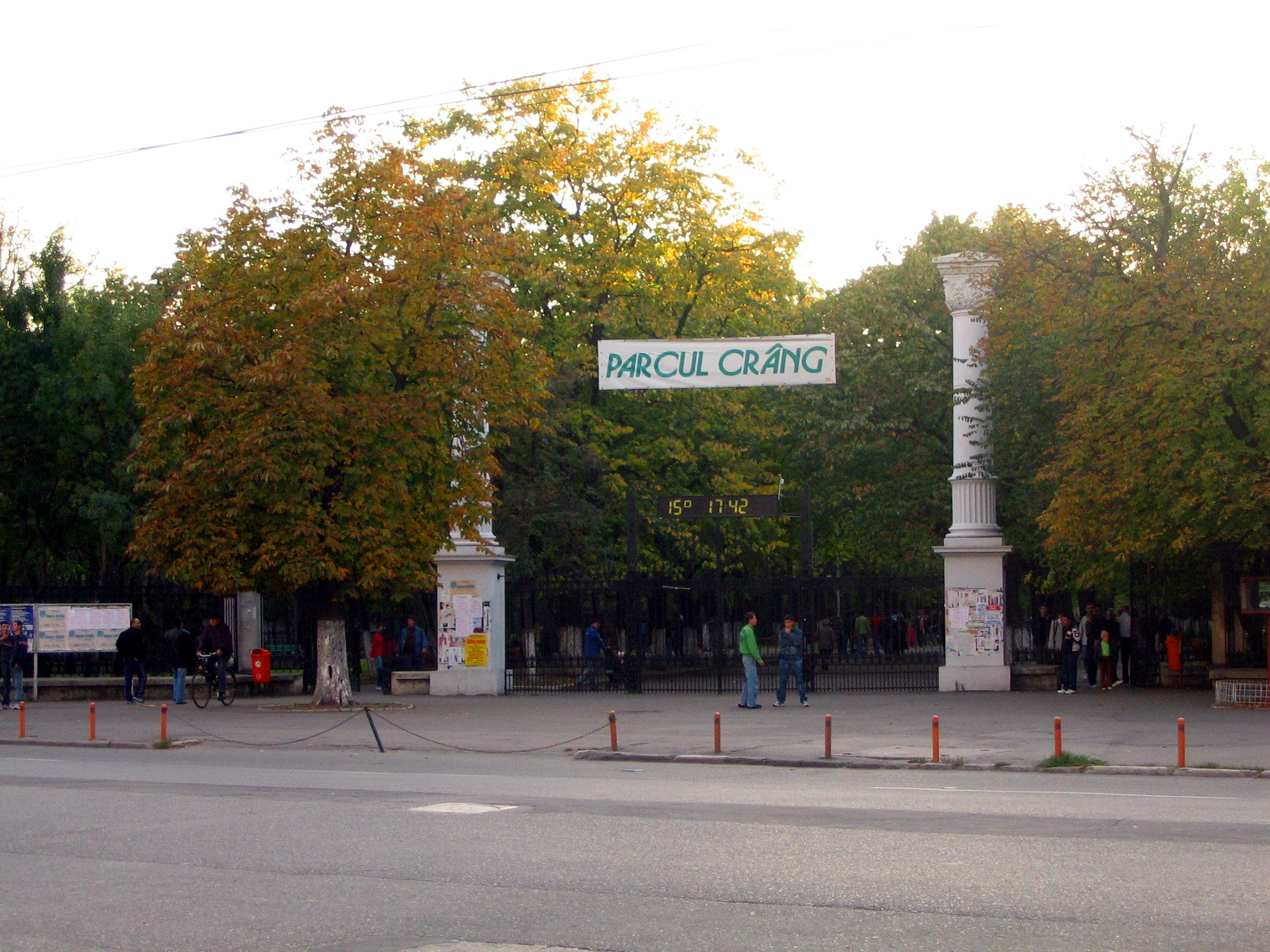
- Main entrance to the Crâng park
- Interactive map of Crâng Park
- Type: public park
- Location: Western outskirts of Buzău
- Coordinates: 45°8′50″N 26°48′3″E
- Area: 100,000 m^{2} (25 acres)
- Created: 1850
- Open: All year

Crâng Park (Romanian: Parcul Crâng) is the largest and most important park in the city of Buzău, Romania.

== Location ==
The park is located on the western outskirts of the city. It has an area of about 100,000 square metres (25 acres). It represents only a part of a 1.89 square kilometre forest, named the Crâng forest, which is a remainder of the Codrii Vlăsiei. The forest is made up mostly of local broadleaf trees, with rather few gymnosperms, and it is known for its oaks, ash trees, lime trees, birches and maple. The park area is also populated with some foreign species of trees and other plants.

== Features ==
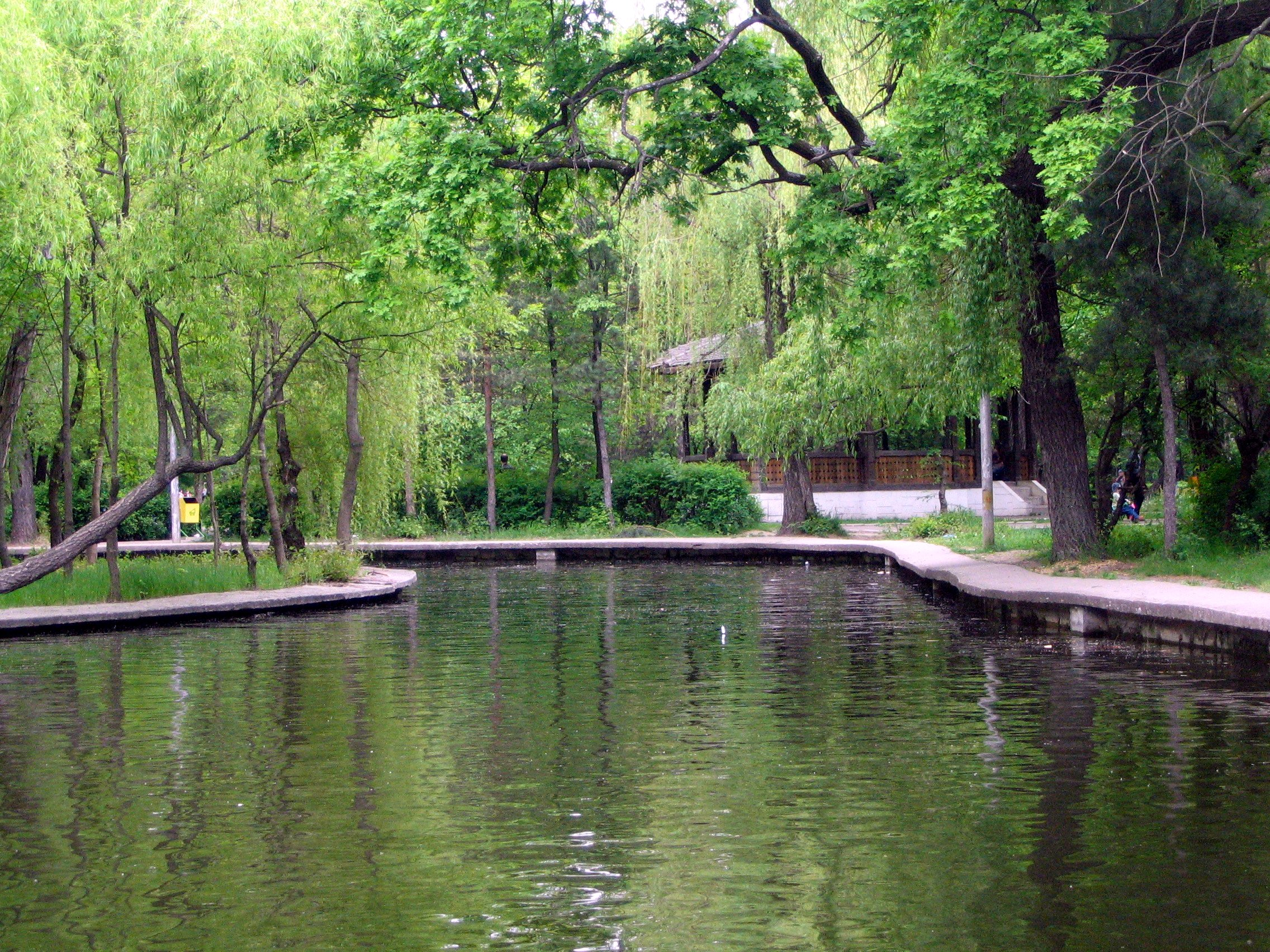
The artificial lake in Crâng park. One of its islands is visible to the left.

The park features an artificial lake, named the Heleşteu lake (in Romanian, heleşteu=pond). The lake was created when the park was built, in order to provide boat rides. Its water is brought in from the Buzău river via a small channel that circles the city. It features three equally-sized islands, one of which is reachable via a bridge, while the other two are reachable only by boat.

In 1976, an obelisk was raised in the center of the park, marking 1,600 years since the earliest documentary attestation of Buzău.

Crâng's attractions also include discothèques, children's playgrounds, a chess and tables players corner (used even during winter days by some enthusiastic players), and boat rides on the lake.

== Etymology ==
The park took the name of the forest in which it was built. In turn, the forest's name, crâng is a Romanian word which can be translated as young forest, which may suggest that at some point in time, the forest was a portion of the Codrii Vlăsiei particularly populated by young trees. Ironically, nowadays, the forest, and the park in particular, contain many century-old oaks.

== History ==
The first reference to this forest by the name "Crâng" dates back to 23 October 1568, when Alexandru II Mircea, domn of Wallachia gave the market's crâng to the bishopric of Buzău. At the time, the area was merely a forest located near Buzău.

The first time when the city's inhabitants used the forest for leisure and party purposes was in 1828 In 1850, a part of the Crâng forest was ceded by the Bishopric to the city, for use as public garden. In 1863, the Secularization of monastic estates act was proposed by Alexander John Cuza and adopted by the Romanian Parliament. Thus, the Crâng forest was handed over by the Bishopric to the Romanian central government, while the city kept its part of the forest where the public garden was located. Later on, however, prime minister Ion C. Brătianu agreed to a request by the city council for the Buzău municipality to be given ownership over the entire Crâng forest:

All right, I will give it to you. But please take it as a jewel of the town, keep it for this purpose and be worthy of the sacrifice the State does in favor of the city

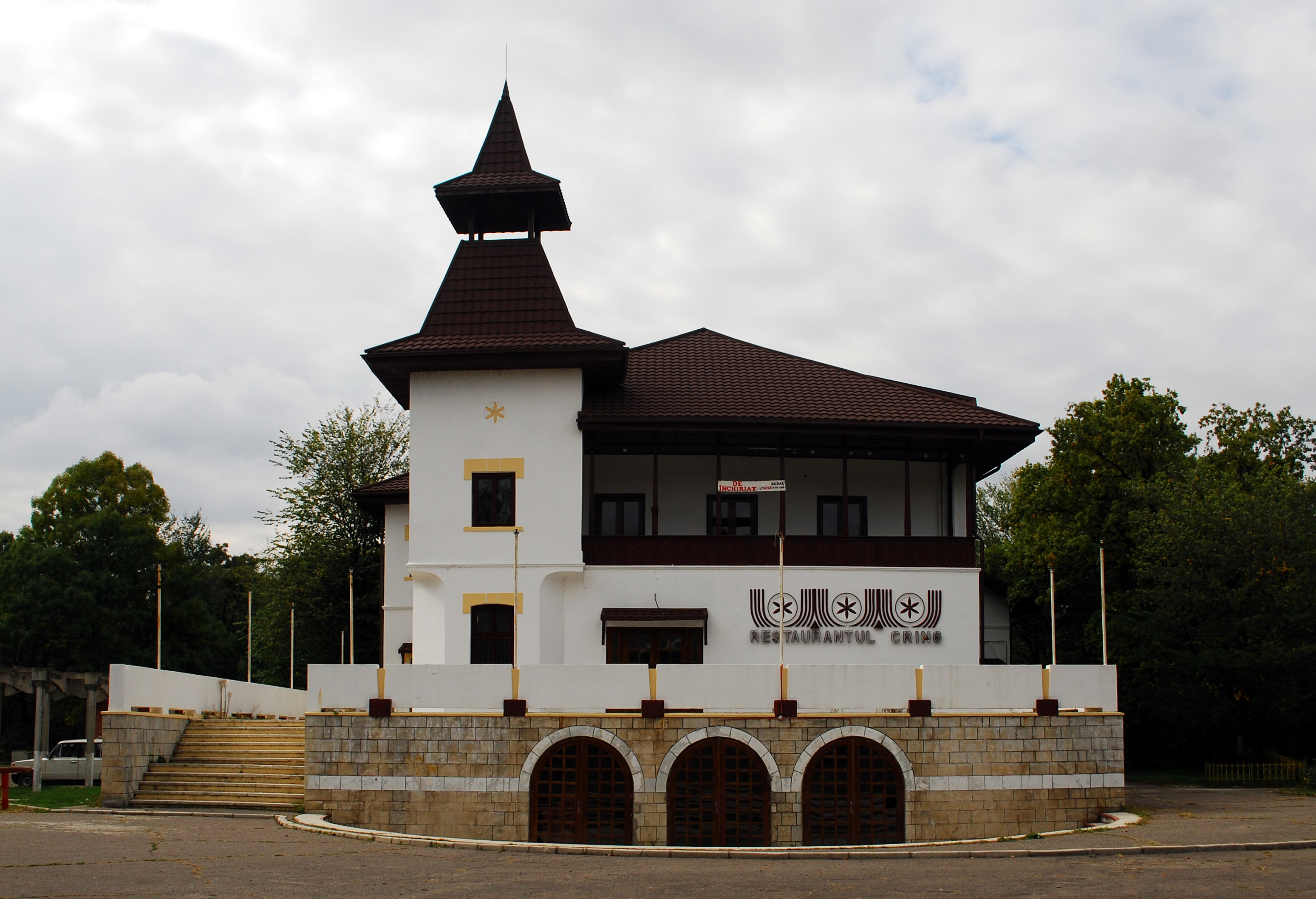
The Crâng restaurant, built 1897

After taking over the forest, the city took steps to enlarge the public garden and create a large park. In 1890, three sculptures were placed in the park, Lion and boar, Lion and deer and Horseman attacked by lion. In 1897, the Crâng Restaurant building was erected. The Restaurant is built in an architectural style inspired by peasant houses from the Chiojdu region. At the same time, the lake was set up, with an island in the middle, and a bridge to provide access to the island. Also, a pavilion was prepared for a fanfare band to perform. Near the lake, the municipality built a water tower, to provide the city with running water.

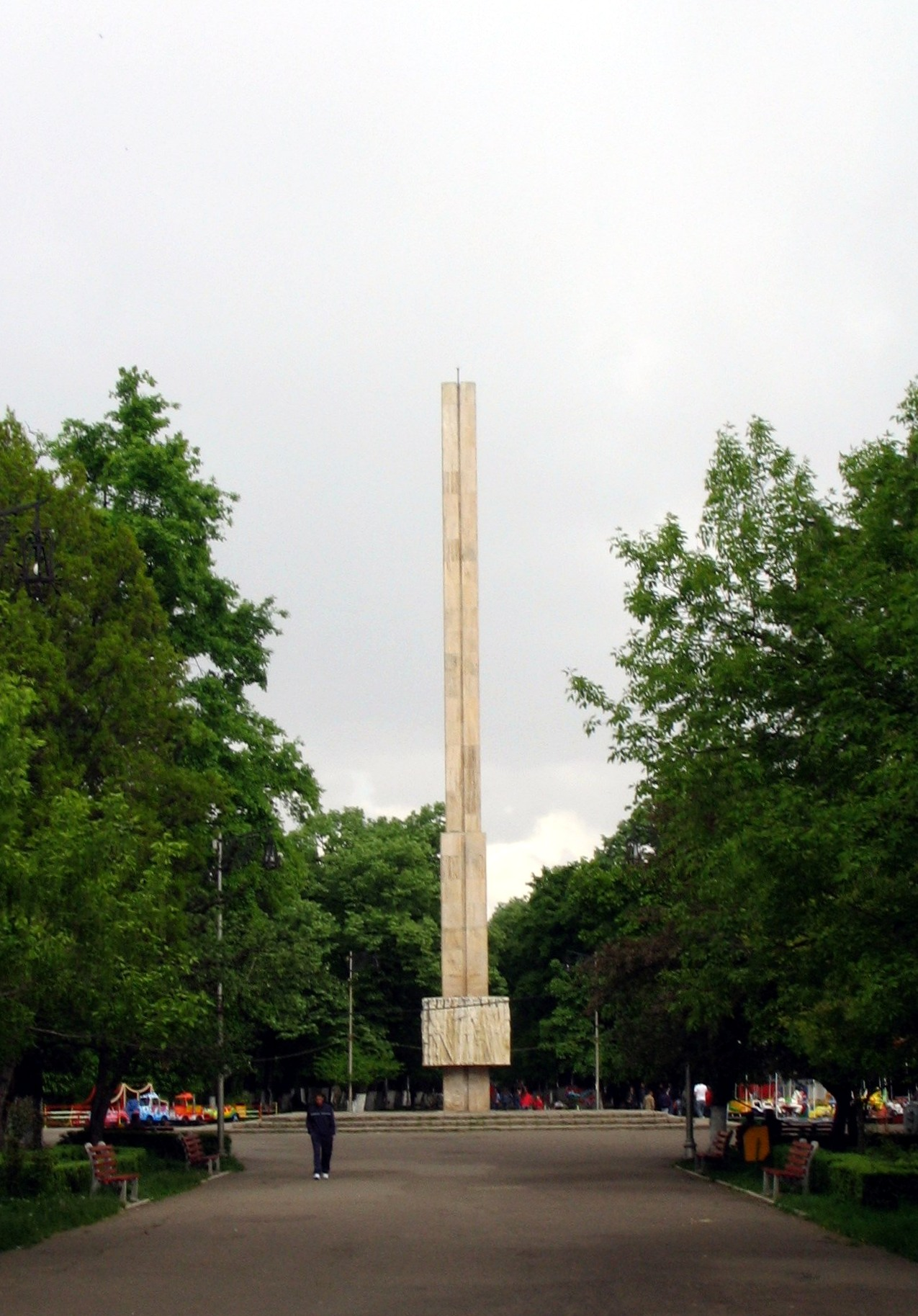
The 1976 Buzău 1600 obelisk

By 1898, the Park Boulevard was finished. The boulevard, nowadays named the Nicolae Bălcescu Boulevard runs from the city center to the Crâng Park. At the time, it had five lanes, of which the center one was used by horse-driven coaches, two by pedestrians and the outer two were for horseback riders. Nowadays, the boulevard has two lanes for automobiles, and large sidewalks. The part of the boulevard next to the park is closed to the traffic on Sundays, to be used only by pedestrians.

In 1922, a small church, named the St. Filofteea church was built.

In 1957, the lake was expanded, and included two more islands, located East of the previous one. The initial island lost the bridge connection and became isolated. One of the new islands (the central one) is now connected to the mainland via a metal bridge.

The Buzău 1600 Obelisk, designed by sculptor Gheorghe Coman, was inaugurated in 1976, to celebrate 1,600 years since Buzău's first recorded historical attestation. The obelisk is 26.8 meters tall and has a foundation 14 meters deep.
