= List of local administrative units of Romania =

Here is a list of all local administrative units (localități; sing. localitate), which are the municipalities (municipii; sing. municipiu), cities (orașe; sing. oraș) and communes (comune; sing. comună) of Romania, grouped by macroregions (macroregiune; sing. macroregiunea), development regions (regiunile de dezvoltare; sing. regiunea de dezvoltare) and counties (județe; sing. județ).

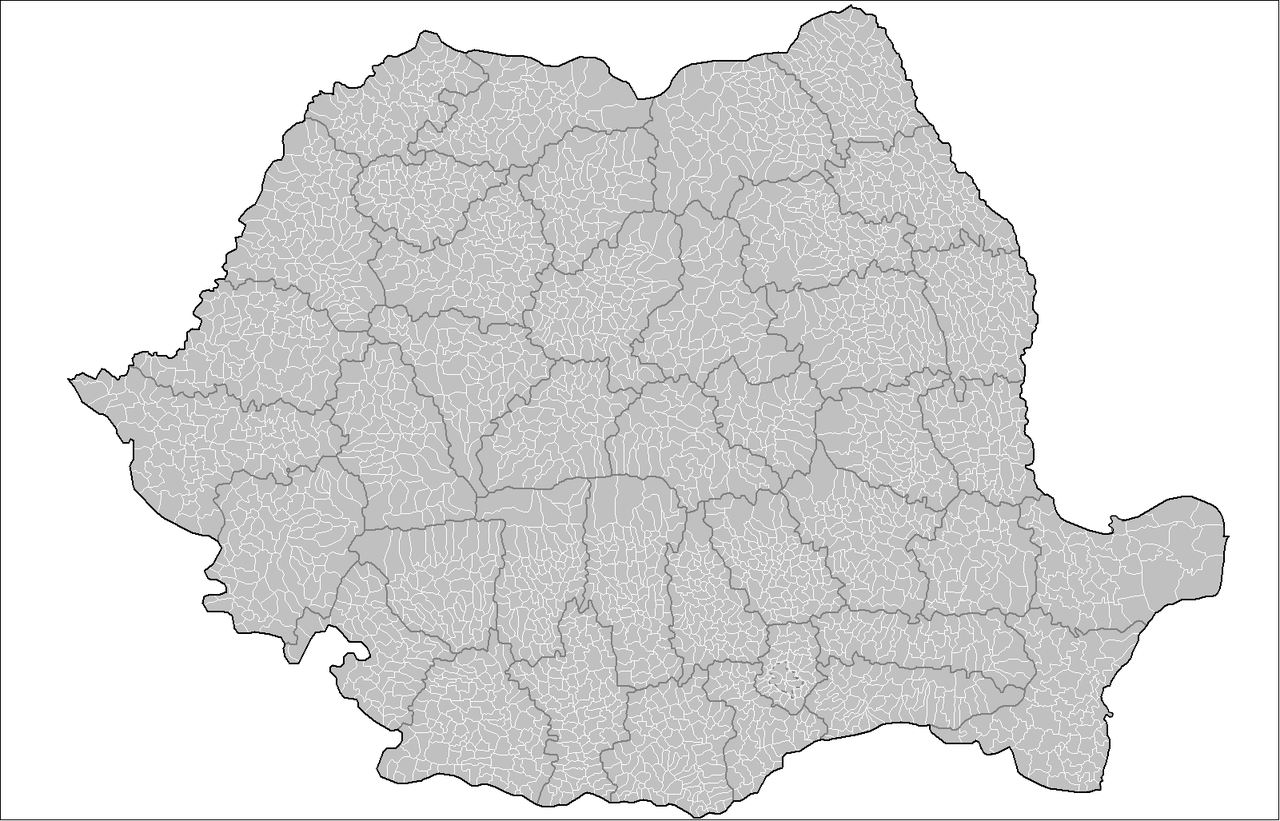
Local administrative units of Romania

== Macroregiunea 1 ==
=== North-West Romania ===
==== Bihor County ====
- 4 municipalities, 6 towns and 91 communes

Municipalities

- Beiuș
- Marghita
- Oradea - capital
- Salonta

Towns

- Aleșd
- Nucet
- Săcueni
- Ștei
- Valea lui Mihai
- Vașcău

Communes

- Abram
- Aștileu
- Aușeu
- Avram Iancu
- Balc
- Batăr
- Biharia
- Boianu Mare
- Borod
- Borș
- Bratca
- Brusturi
- Budureasa
- Buduslău
- Bulz
- Buntești
- Căbești
- Câmpani
- Căpâlna
- Cărpinet
- Cefa
- Ceica
- Cetariu
- Cherechiu
- Chișlaz
- Ciumeghiu
- Cociuba Mare
- Copăcel
- Criștioru de Jos
- Curățele
- Curtuișeni
- Derna
- Diosig
- Dobrești
- Drăgănești
- Drăgești
- Finiș
- Gepiu
- Girișu de Criș
- Hidișelu de Sus
- Holod
- Husasău de Tinca
- Ineu
- Lăzăreni
- Lazuri de Beiuș
- Lugașu de Jos
- Lunca
- Mădăras
- Măgești
- Nojorid
- Olcea
- Oșorhei
- Paleu
- Petreu
- Pietroasa
- Pocola
- Pomezeu
- Popești
- Răbăgani
- Remetea
- Rieni
- Roșia
- Roșiori
- Sâmbăta
- Sâniob
- Sânnicolau Român
- Sânmartin
- Sântandrei
- Sârbi
- Săcădat
- Sălacea
- Sălard
- Spinuș
- Suplacu de Barcău
- Șimian
- Șinteu
- Șoimi
- Șuncuiuș
- Tămășeu
- Tărcaia
- Tarcea
- Tăuteu
- Tileagd
- Tinca
- Toboliu
- Tulca
- Țețchea
- Uileacu de Beiuș
- Vadu Crișului
- Vârciorog
- Viișoara

==== Bistrița-Năsăud County ====
- 1 municipality, 3 towns and 58 communes

Municipalities

- Bistrița - capital

Towns

- Beclean
- Năsăud
- Sângeorz-Băi

Communes

- Bistrița Bârgăului
- Braniștea
- Budacu de Jos
- Budești
- Căianu Mic
- Cetate
- Chiochiș
- Chiuza
- Ciceu-Giurgești
- Ciceu-Mihăiești
- Coșbuc
- Dumitra
- Dumitrița
- Feldru
- Galații Bistriței
- Ilva Mare
- Ilva Mică
- Josenii Bârgăului
- Leșu
- Lechința
- Livezile
- Lunca Ilvei
- Maieru
- Matei
- Măgura Ilvei
- Mărișelu
- Miceștii de Câmpie
- Milaș
- Monor
- Negrilești
- Nimigea
- Nușeni
- Parva
- Petru Rareș
- Poiana Ilvei
- Prundu Bârgăului
- Rebra
- Rebrișoara
- Rodna
- Romuli
- Runcu Salvei
- Salva
- Sânmihaiu de Câmpie
- Șieu
- Șieu-Odorhei
- Șieu-Măgheruș
- Șieuț
- Șintereag
- Silivașu de Câmpie
- Spermezeu
- Șanț
- Târlișua
- Teaca
- Telciu
- Tiha Bârgăului
- Uriu
- Urmeniș
- Zagra

==== Cluj County ====
- 5 municipalities, 1 town and 75 communes

Municipalities

- Câmpia Turzii
- Cluj-Napoca - capital
- Dej
- Gherla
- Turda

Towns

- Huedin

Communes

- Aghireșu
- Aiton
- Aluniș
- Apahida
- Așchileu
- Baciu
- Băișoara
- Beliș
- Bobâlna
- Bonțida
- Borșa
- Buza
- Căianu
- Călărași
- Călățele
- Cămărașu
- Căpușu Mare
- Cășeiu
- Cătina
- Câțcău
- Ceanu Mare
- Chinteni
- Chiuiești
- Ciucea
- Ciurila
- Cojocna
- Cornești
- Cuzdrioara
- Dăbâca
- Feleacu
- Fizeșu Gherlii
- Florești
- Frata
- Gârbău
- Geaca
- Gilău
- Iara
- Iclod
- Izvoru Crișului
- Jichișu de Jos
- Jucu
- Luna
- Măguri-Răcătău
- Mănăstireni
- Mărgău
- Mărișel
- Mica
- Mihai Viteazu
- Mintiu Gherlii
- Mociu
- Moldovenești
- Negreni
- Pălatca
- Panticeu
- Petreștii de Jos
- Ploscoș
- Poieni
- Râșca
- Recea-Cristur
- Săcuieu
- Săndulești
- Săvădisla
- Sâncraiu
- Sânmartin
- Sânpaul
- Sic
- Suatu
- Tritenii de Jos
- Tureni
- Țaga
- Unguraș
- Vad
- Valea Ierii
- Viișoara
- Vultureni

==== Maramureș County ====
- 2 municipalities, 11 towns and 63 communes

Municipalities

- Baia Mare - capital
- Sighetu Marmației

Towns

- Baia Sprie
- Borșa
- Cavnic
- Dragomirești
- Săliștea de Sus
- Seini
- Șomcuta Mare
- Târgu Lăpuș
- Tăuții-Măgherăuș
- Ulmeni
- Vișeu de Sus

Communes

- Ardusat
- Ariniș
- Asuaju de Sus
- Băița de sub Codru
- Băiuț
- Bârsana
- Băsești
- Bicaz
- Bistra
- Bocicoiu Mare
- Bogdan Vodă
- Boiu Mare
- Botiza
- Budești
- Călinești
- Câmpulung la Tisa
- Cernești
- Cicârlău
- Coaș
- Coltău
- Copalnic-Mănăștur
- Coroieni
- Cupșeni
- Desești
- Dumbrăvița
- Fărcașa
- Gârdani
- Giulești
- Groși
- Groșii Țibleșului
- Ieud
- Lăpuș
- Leordina
- Mireșu Mare
- Moisei
- Oarța de Jos
- Ocna Șugatag
- Oncești
- Petrova
- Poienile de sub Munte
- Poienile Izei
- Recea
- Remetea Chioarului
- Remeți
- Repedea
- Rona de Jos
- Rona de Sus
- Rozavlea
- Ruscova
- Săcălășeni
- Săcel
- Sălsig
- Săpânța
- Sarasău
- Satulung
- Șieu
- Șișești
- Strâmtura
- Suciu de Sus
- Vadu Izei
- Valea Chioarului
- Vima Mică
- Vișeu de Jos

==== Satu Mare County ====
- 2 municipalities, 4 towns and 59 communes

Municipalities

- Satu Mare - capital
- Carei

Towns

- Ardud
- Livada
- Negrești-Oaș
- Tășnad

Communes

- Acâș
- Agriș
- Andrid
- Apa
- Bătarci
- Beltiug
- Berveni
- Bixad
- Bârsău
- Bogdand
- Botiz
- Călinești-Oaș
- Cămărzana
- Cămin
- Căpleni
- Căuaș
- Cehal
- Certeze
- Ciumești
- Craidorolț
- Crucișor
- Culciu
- Doba
- Dorolț
- Foieni
- Gherța Mică
- Halmeu
- Hodod
- Homoroade
- Lazuri
- Medieșu Aurit
- Micula
- Moftin
- Odoreu
- Orașu Nou
- Păulești
- Petrești
- Pir
- Pișcolt
- Pomi
- Porumbești
- Racșa
- Sanislău
- Santău
- Săcășeni
- Săuca
- Socond
- Supur
- Tarna Mare
- Terebești
- Tiream
- Târșolț
- Turț
- Turulung
- Urziceni
- Valea Vinului
- Vetiș
- Viile Satu Mare
- Vama

==== Sălaj County ====
- 1 municipality, 3 towns and 58 communes; subdivided into 281 villages

Municipalities

- Zalău - capital

Towns

- Cehu Silvaniei
- Jibou
- Șimleu Silvaniei

Communes

- Agrij
- Almașu
- Băbeni
- Bălan
- Bănișor
- Benesat
- Bobota
- Bocșa
- Boghiș
- Buciumi
- Camăr
- Carastelec
- Chieșd
- Cizer
- Coșeiu
- Crasna
- Creaca
- Crișeni
- Cristolț
- Cuzăplac
- Dobrin
- Dragu
- Fildu de Jos
- Gâlgău
- Gârbou
- Halmășd
- Hereclean
- Hida
- Horoatu Crasnei
- Ileanda
- Ip
- Letca
- Lozna
- Măeriște
- Marca
- Meseșenii de Jos
- Mirșid
- Năpradea
- Nușfalău
- Pericei
- Plopiș
- Poiana Blenchii
- Românași
- Rus
- Sălățig
- Sâg
- Sânmihaiu Almașului
- Someș-Odorhei
- Surduc
- Șamșud
- Sărmășag
- Șimișna
- Treznea
- Valcău de Jos
- Vârșolț
- Zalha
- Zimbor

=== Central Romania ===
==== Alba County ====
- 4 municipalities, 7 towns and 68 communes

Municipalities

- Aiud
- Alba Iulia - capital
- Blaj
- Sebeș

Towns

- Abrud
- Baia de Arieș
- Câmpeni
- Cugir
- Ocna Mureș
- Teiuș
- Zlatna

Communes

- Albac
- Almașu Mare
- Arieșeni
- Avram Iancu
- Berghin
- Bistra
- Blandiana
- Bucerdea Grânoasă
- Bucium
- Câlnic
- Cenade
- Cergău
- Ceru-Băcăinți
- Cetatea de Baltă
- Ciugud
- Ciuruleasa
- Crăciunelu de Jos
- Cricău
- Cut
- Daia Română
- Doștat
- Fărău
- Galda de Jos
- Gârbova
- Gârda de Sus
- Hopârta
- Horea
- Ighiu
- Întregalde
- Jidvei
- Livezile
- Lopadea Nouă
- Lunca Mureșului
- Lupșa
- Meteș
- Mihalț
- Mirăslău
- Mogoș
- Noșlac
- Ocoliș
- Ohaba
- Pianu
- Poiana Vadului
- Ponor
- Poșaga
- Rădești
- Râmeț
- Rimetea
- Roșia de Secaș
- Roșia Montană
- Sălciua
- Săliștea
- Sâncel
- Sântimbru
- Săsciori
- Scărișoara
- Șibot
- Sohodol
- Șona
- Șpring
- Stremț
- Șugag
- Unirea
- Vadu Moților
- Valea Lungă
- Vidra
- Vințu de Jos

==== Brașov County ====
- 4 municipalities, 6 towns and 48 communes

Municipalities

- Brașov - capital
- Codlea
- Făgăraș
- Săcele

Towns

- Ghimbav
- Predeal
- Râșnov
- Rupea
- Victoria
- Zărnești

Communes

- Apața
- Augustin
- Beclean
- Bod
- Bran
- Budila
- Bunești
- Cața
- Cincu
- Comăna
- Cristian
- Crizbav
- Drăguș
- Dumbrăvița
- Feldioara
- Fundata
- Hălchiu
- Hărman
- Hârseni
- Hoghiz
- Holbav
- Homorod
- Jibert
- Lisa
- Mândra
- Măieruș
- Moieciu
- Ormeniș
- Părău
- Poiana Mărului
- Prejmer
- Racoș
- Recea
- Șercaia
- Șinca
- Șinca Nouă
- Sâmbăta de Sus
- Sânpetru
- Șoarș
- Tărlungeni
- Teliu
- Ticușu
- Ucea
- Ungra
- Vama Buzăului
- Viștea
- Voila
- Vulcan

==== Covasna County ====
- 2 municipalities, 3 towns and 40 communes

Municipalities

- Sfântu Gheorghe (Sepsiszentgyörgy) - capital
- Târgu Secuiesc (Kézdivásárhely)

Towns

- Baraolt (Barót)
- Covasna (Kovászna)
- Întorsura Buzăului (Bodzaforduló)

Communes

- Aita Mare (Nagyajta)
- Arcuș (Árkos)
- Barcani (Zágonbárkány)
- Bățani (Nagybacon)
- Belin (Bölön)
- Bixad (Sepsibükszád)
- Bodoc (Sepsibodok)
- Boroșneu Mare (Nagyborosnyó)
- Brăduț (Bardoc)
- Brateș (Barátos)
- Brețcu (Bereck)
- Catalina (Szentkatolna)
- Cernat (Csernáton)
- Chichiș (Kökös)
- Comandău (Kommandó)
- Dalnic (Dálnok)
- Dobârlău (Dobolló)
- Estelnic (Esztelnek)
- Ghelința (Gelence)
- Ghidfalău (Gidófalva)
- Hăghig (Hídvég)
- Ilieni (Illyefalva)
- Lemnia (Lemhény)
- Malnaș (Málnás)
- Mereni (Kézdialmás)
- Micfalău (Mikóújfalu)
- Moacșa (Maksa)
- Ojdula (Ozsdola)
- Ozun (Uzon)
- Poian (Kézdiszentkereszt)
- Reci (Réty)
- Sânzieni (Kézdiszentlélek)
- Sita Buzăului (Szitabodza)
- Turia (Torja)
- Vâlcele (Előpatak)
- Valea Crișului (Sepsikőröspatak)
- Valea Mare (Nagypatak)
- Vârghiș (Vargyas)
- Zăbala (Zabola)
- Zagon (Zágon)

==== Harghita County ====
- 4 municipalities, 5 towns and 58 communes

Municipalities

- Gheorgheni (Gyergyószentmiklós)
- Miercurea Ciuc (Csíkszereda) - capital
- Odorheiu Secuiesc (Székelyudvarhely)
- Toplița (Maroshévíz)

Towns

- Băile Tușnad (Tusnádfürdő)
- Bălan (Balánbánya)
- Borsec (Borszék)
- Cristuru Secuiesc (Székelykeresztúr)
- Vlăhița (Szentegyháza)

Communes

- Atid (Etéd)
- Avrămești (Szentábrahám)
- Bilbor (Bélbor)
- Brădești (Fenyéd)
- Căpâlnița (Kápolnásfalu)
- Cârța (Csíkkarcfalva)
- Ciceu (Csíkcsicsó)
- Ciucsângeorgiu (Csíkszentgyörgy)
- Ciumani (Gyergyócsomafalva)
- Corbu (Gyergyóholló)
- Corund (Korond)
- Cozmeni (Csíkkozmás)
- Dănești (Csíkdánfalva)
- Dârjiu (Székelyderzs)
- Dealu (Oroszhegy)
- Ditrău (Ditró)
- Feliceni (Felsőboldogfalva)
- Frumoasa (Szépvíz)
- Gălăuțaș (Galócás)
- Joseni (Gyergyóalfalu)
- Lăzarea (Gyergyószárhegy)
- Leliceni (Csíkszentlélek)
- Lueta (Lövéte)
- Lunca de Jos (Gyimesközéplok)
- Lunca de Sus (Gyimesfelsőlok)
- Lupeni (Farkaslaka)
- Mădăraș (Csíkmadaras)
- Mărtiniș (Homoródszentmárton)
- Merești (Homoródalmás)
- Mihăileni (Csíkszentmihály)
- Mugeni (Bögöz)
- Ocland (Oklánd)
- Păuleni-Ciuc (Csíkpálfalva)
- Plăieșii de Jos (Kászonaltíz)
- Porumbeni (Galambfalva)
- Praid (Parajd)
- Racu (Csíkrákos)
- Remetea (Gyergyóremete)
- Săcel (Székelyandrásfalva)
- Sâncrăieni (Csíkszentkirály)
- Sândominic (Csíkszentdomokos)
- Sânmartin (Csíkszentmárton)
- Sânsimion (Csíkszentsimon)
- Sântimbru (Csíkszentimre)
- Sărmaș (Salamás)
- Satu Mare (Máréfalva)
- Secuieni (Újszékely)
- Siculeni (Madéfalva)
- Șimonești (Siménfalva)
- Subcetate (Gyergyóvárhegy)
- Suseni (Gyergyóújfalu)
- Tomești (Csíkszenttamás)
- Tulgheș (Gyergyótölgyes)
- Tușnad (Tusnád)
- Ulieș (Kányád)
- Vărșag (Székelyvarság)
- Voșlăbeni (Vasláb)
- Zetea (Zetelaka)

==== Mureș County ====
- 4 municipalities, 7 towns and 91 communes

Municipalities

- Reghin
- Sighișoara
- Târgu Mureș - capital
- Târnăveni

Towns

- Iernut
- Luduș
- Miercurea Nirajului
- Sângeorgiu de Pădure
- Sărmașu
- Sovata
- Ungheni

Communes

- Acățari
- Adămuș
- Albești
- Aluniș
- Apold
- Ațintiș
- Bahnea
- Band
- Batoș
- Băgaciu
- Băla
- Bălăușeri
- Beica de Jos
- Bereni
- Bichiș
- Bogata
- Brâncovenești
- Breaza
- Ceuașu de Câmpie
- Chețani
- Chibed
- Chiheru de Jos
- Coroisânmărtin
- Corunca
- Cozma
- Crăciunești
- Cucerdea
- Crăiești
- Cristești
- Cuci
- Daneș
- Deda
- Eremitu
- Ernei
- Fântânele
- Fărăgău
- Gălești
- Gănești
- Gheorghe Doja
- Ghindari
- Glodeni
- Gornești
- Grebenișu de Câmpie
- Gurghiu
- Hodac
- Hodoșa
- Ibănești
- Iclănzel
- Ideciu de Jos
- Livezeni
- Lunca
- Lunca Bradului
- Mădăraș
- Măgherani
- Mica
- Miheșu de Câmpie
- Nadeș
- Neaua
- Ogra
- Papiu Ilarian
- Pănet
- Păsăreni
- Petelea
- Pogăceaua
- Râciu
- Răstolița
- Rușii-Munți
- Sâncraiu de Mureș
- Sângeorgiu de Mureș
- Sânger
- Sânpaul
- Sânpetru de Câmpie
- Sântana de Mureș
- Sărățeni
- Saschiz
- Solovăstru
- Stânceni
- Suplac
- Suseni
- Șăulia
- Șincai
- Tăureni
- Valea Largă
- Vânători
- Vărgata
- Vătava
- Vețca
- Viișoara
- Voivodeni
- Zagăr
- Zau de Câmpie

==== Sibiu County ====
- 2 municipalities, 9 towns and 53 communes

Municipalities

- Mediaș
- Sibiu - capital

Towns

- Agnita
- Avrig
- Cisnădie
- Copșa Mică
- Dumbrăveni
- Miercurea Sibiului
- Ocna Sibiului
- Săliște
- Tălmaciu

Communes

- Alma
- Alțâna
- Apoldu de Jos
- Arpașu de Jos
- Ațel
- Axente Sever
- Bazna
- Bârghiș
- Biertan
- Blăjel
- Boița
- Brateiu
- Brădeni
- Bruiu
- Chirpăr
- Cârța
- Cârțișoara
- Cristian
- Dârlos
- Gura Râului
- Hoghilag
- Iacobeni
- Jina
- Laslea
- Loamneș
- Ludoș
- Marpod
- Merghindeal
- Micăsasa
- Mihăileni
- Moșna
- Nocrich
- Orlat
- Păuca
- Poiana Sibiului
- Poplaca
- Porumbacu de Jos
- Racovița
- Rășinari
- Râu Sadului
- Roșia
- Sadu
- Slimnic
- Șeica Mare
- Șeica Mică
- Șelimbăr
- Șura Mare
- Șura Mică
- Tilișca
- Târnava
- Turnu Roșu
- Valea Viilor
- Vurpăr

== Macroregiunea 2 ==
=== North-East Romania ===
==== Bacău County ====
- 3 municipalities, 5 towns and 85 communes

Municipalities

- Bacău - capital
- Moinești
- Onești

Towns

- Buhuși
- Comănești
- Dărmănești
- Slănic-Moldova
- Târgu Ocna

Communes

- Agăș
- Ardeoani
- Asău
- Balcani
- Berești-Bistrița
- Berești-Tazlău
- Berzunți
- Bârsănești
- Blăgești
- Bogdănești
- Brusturoasa
- Buciumi
- Buhoci
- Cașin
- Căiuți
- Cleja
- Colonești
- Corbasca
- Coțofănești
- Dămienești
- Dealu Morii
- Dofteana
- Faraoani
- Filipeni
- Filipești
- Găiceana
- Ghimeș-Făget
- Gârleni
- Glăvănești
- Gioseni
- Gura Văii
- Helegiu
- Hemeiuș
- Huruiești
- Horgești
- Izvoru Berheciului
- Itești
- Letea Veche
- Lipova
- Livezi
- Luizi-Călugăra
- Măgirești
- Măgura
- Mănăstirea Cașin
- Mărgineni
- Motoșeni
- Negri
- Nicolae Bălcescu
- Odobești
- Oituz
- Oncești
- Orbeni
- Palanca
- Parava
- Pâncești
- Parincea
- Pârgărești
- Pârjol
- Plopana
- Podu Turcului
- Poduri
- Prăjești
- Racova
- Răcăciuni
- Răchitoasa
- Roșiori
- Sascut
- Sănduleni
- Sărata
- Săucești
- Scorțeni
- Secuieni
- Solonț
- Stănișești
- Strugari
- Ștefan cel Mare
- Tamași
- Tătărăști
- Târgu Trotuș
- Traian
- Ungureni
- Urechești
- Valea Seacă
- Vultureni
- Zemeș

==== Botoșani County ====
- 2 municipalities, 5 towns and 71 communes

Municipalities

- Botoșani - capital
- Dorohoi

Towns

- Bucecea
- Darabani
- Flămânzi
- Săveni
- Ștefănești

Communes

- Adășeni
- Albești
- Avrămeni
- Bălușeni
- Blândești
- Brăești
- Broscăuți
- Călărași
- Cândești
- Concești
- Copălău
- Cordăreni
- Corlăteni
- Corni
- Coșula
- Coțușca
- Cristești
- Cristinești
- Curtești
- Dersca
- Dângeni
- Dimăcheni
- Dobârceni
- Drăgușeni
- Durnești
- Frumușica
- George Enescu
- Gorbănești
- Havârna
- Hănești
- Hilișeu-Horia
- Hlipiceni
- Hudești
- Ibănești
- Leorda
- Lozna
- Lunca
- Manoleasa
- Mihai Eminescu
- Mihăileni
- Mihălășeni
- Mileanca
- Mitoc
- Nicșeni
- Păltiniș
- Pomârla
- Prăjeni
- Rădăuți-Prut
- Răchiți
- Răuseni
- Ripiceni
- Roma
- Românești
- Santa Mare
- Stăuceni
- Suharău
- Sulița
- Șendriceni
- Știubieni
- Todireni
- Trușești
- Tudora
- Ungureni
- Unțeni
- Văculești
- Viișoara
- Vârfu Câmpului
- Vlădeni
- Vlăsinești
- Vorniceni
- Vorona

==== Iași County ====
- 2 municipalities, 3 towns and 93 communes

Municipalities

- Iași - capital
- Pașcani

Towns

- Hârlău
- Podu Iloaiei
- Târgu Frumos

Communes

- Alexandru Ioan Cuza
- Andrieșeni
- Aroneanu
- Balș
- Bălțați
- Bârnova
- Belcești
- Bivolari
- Brăești
- Butea
- Ceplenița
- Ciohorăni
- Ciortești
- Ciurea
- Coarnele Caprei
- Comarna
- Costești
- Costuleni
- Cotnari
- Cozmești
- Cristești
- Cucuteni
- Dagâța
- Deleni
- Dobrovăț
- Dolhești
- Drăgușeni
- Dumești
- Erbiceni
- Fântânele
- Focuri
- Golăiești
- Gorban
- Grajduri
- Gropnița
- Grozești
- Hălăucești
- Hărmănești
- Heleșteni
- Holboca
- Horlești
- Ion Neculce
- Ipatele
- Lespezi
- Lețcani
- Lungani
- Mădârjac
- Mircești
- Mironeasa
- Miroslava
- Miroslovești
- Mogoșești
- Mogoșești-Siret
- Moșna
- Moțca
- Movileni
- Oțeleni
- Plugari
- Popești
- Popricani
- Prisăcani
- Probota
- Răchiteni
- Răducăneni
- Rediu
- Românești
- Roșcani
- Ruginoasa
- Scânteia
- Schitu Duca
- Scobinți
- Sinești
- Sirețel
- Stolniceni-Prăjescu
- Strunga
- Șcheia
- Șipote
- Tansa
- Tătăruși
- Țibana
- Țibănești
- Țigănași
- Todirești
- Tomești
- Trifești
- Țuțora
- Ungheni
- Valea Lupului
- Valea Seacă
- Vânători
- Victoria
- Vlădeni
- Voinești

==== Neamț County ====
- 2 municipalities, 3 towns and 78 communes

Municipalities

- Piatra Neamț - capital
- Roman

Towns

- Bicaz
- Roznov
- Târgu Neamț

Communes

- Agapia
- Alexandru cel Bun
- Bahna
- Bălțătești
- Bârgăuani
- Bicaz-Chei
- Bicazu Ardelean
- Bâra
- Bodești
- Boghicea
- Borca
- Borlești
- Botești
- Bozieni
- Brusturi
- Cândești
- Ceahlău
- Cordun
- Costișa
- Crăcăoani
- Dămuc
- Dobreni
- Dochia
- Doljești
- Dragomirești
- Drăgănești
- Dulcești
- Dumbrava Roșie
- Farcașa
- Făurei
- Gâdinți
- Gârcina
- Gherăești
- Ghindăoani
- Girov
- Grințieș
- Grumăzești
- Hangu
- Horia
- Icușești
- Ion Creangă
- Mărgineni
- Moldoveni
- Negrești
- Oniceni
- Păstrăveni
- Pâncești
- Pângărați
- Petricani
- Piatra Șoimului
- Pipirig
- Podoleni
- Poiana Teiului
- Poienari
- Răucești
- Războieni
- Rediu
- Români
- Ruginoasa
- Sagna
- Săbăoani
- Săvinești
- Secuieni
- Stănița
- Ștefan cel Mare
- Tarcău
- Tașca
- Tazlău
- Tămășeni
- Timișești
- Trifești
- Tupilați
- Țibucani
- Urecheni
- Valea Ursului
- Văleni
- Vânători-Neamț
- Zănești

==== Suceava County ====
- 5 municipalities, 11 towns and 98 communes

Municipalities

- Câmpulung Moldovenesc
- Fălticeni
- Rădăuți
- Suceava - capital
- Vatra Dornei

Towns

- Broșteni
- Cajvana
- Dolhasca
- Frasin
- Gura Humorului
- Liteni
- Milișăuți
- Salcea
- Siret
- Solca
- Vicovu de Sus

Communes

- Adâncata
- Arbore
- Baia
- Bălăceana
- Bălcăuți
- Berchișești
- Bilca
- Bogdănești
- Boroaia
- Bosanci
- Botoșana
- Breaza
- Brodina
- Bunești
- Burla
- Cacica
- Calafindești
- Capu Câmpului
- Cârlibaba
- Ciocănești
- Ciprian Porumbescu
- Comănești
- Cornu Luncii
- Coșna
- Crucea
- Dărmănești
- Dolhești
- Dorna-Arini
- Dorna Candrenilor
- Dornești
- Drăgoiești
- Drăgușeni
- Dumbrăveni
- Fântâna Mare
- Fântânele
- Forăști
- Frătăuții Noi
- Frătăuții Vechi
- Frumosu
- Fundu Moldovei
- Gălănești
- Grămești
- Grănicești
- Hănțești
- Hârtop
- Horodnic de Jos
- Horodnic de Sus
- Horodniceni
- Iacobeni
- Iaslovăț
- Ilișești
- Ipotești
- Izvoarele Sucevei
- Mălini
- Mănăstirea Humorului
- Marginea
- Mitocu Dragomirnei
- Moara
- Moldova-Sulița
- Moldovița
- Mușenița
- Ostra
- Păltinoasa
- Panaci
- Pârteștii de Jos
- Pătrăuți
- Poiana Stampei
- Poieni-Solca
- Pojorâta
- Preutești
- Putna
- Rădășeni
- Râșca
- Sadova
- Șaru Dornei
- Satu Mare
- Șcheia
- Șerbăuți
- Siminicea
- Slatina
- Straja
- Stroiești
- Stulpicani
- Sucevița
- Todirești
- Udești
- Ulma
- Vadu Moldovei
- Valea Moldovei
- Vama
- Vatra Moldoviței
- Verești
- Vicovu de Jos
- Voitinel
- Volovăț
- Vulturești
- Zamostea
- Zvoriștea

==== Vaslui County ====
- 3 municipalities, 2 towns and 81 communes

Municipalities

- Bârlad
- Huși
- Vaslui - capital

Towns

- Murgeni
- Negrești

Communes

- Albești
- Alexandru Vlahuță
- Arsura
- Băcani
- Băcești
- Bălteni
- Banca
- Berezeni
- Blăgești
- Bogdana
- Bogdănești
- Bogdănița
- Boțești
- Bunești-Averești
- Ciocani
- Codăești
- Coroiești
- Costești
- Cozmești
- Crețești
- Dănești
- Deleni
- Delești
- Dimitrie Cantemir
- Dodești
- Dragomirești
- Drânceni
- Duda-Epureni
- Dumești
- Epureni
- Fălciu
- Ferești
- Fruntișeni
- Găgești
- Gârceni
- Gherghești
- Grivița
- Hoceni
- Iana
- Ibănești
- Ivănești
- Ivești
- Laza
- Lipovăț
- Lunca Banului
- Mălușteni
- Miclești
- Muntenii de Jos
- Muntenii de Sus
- Oltenești
- Oșești
- Pădureni
- Perieni
- Pochidia
- Pogana
- Pogonești
- Poienești
- Puiești
- Pungești
- Pușcași
- Rafaila
- Rebricea
- Roșiești
- Solești
- Stănilești
- Ștefan cel Mare
- Șuletea
- Tăcuta
- Tanacu
- Tătărăni
- Todirești
- Tutova
- Văleni
- Vetrișoaia
- Viișoara
- Vinderei
- Voinești
- Vulturești
- Vutcani
- Zăpodeni
- Zorleni

=== South-East Romania ===
==== Brăila County ====
- 1 municipality, 3 towns and 40 communes

Municipalities

- Brăila - capital

Towns

- Făurei
- Ianca
- Însurăței

Communes

- Bărăganul
- Berteștii de Jos
- Bordei Verde
- Cazasu
- Chiscani
- Ciocile
- Cireșu
- Dudești
- Frecăței
- Galbenu
- Gemenele
- Grădiștea
- Gropeni
- Jirlău
- Mărașu
- Măxineni
- Mircea Vodă
- Movila Miresii
- Racovița
- Râmnicelu
- Romanu
- Roșiori
- Salcia Tudor
- Scorțaru Nou
- Siliștea
- Stăncuța
- Surdila-Găiseanca
- Surdila-Greci
- Șuțești
- Tichilești
- Traian
- Tudor Vladimirescu
- Tufești
- Ulmu
- Unirea
- Vădeni
- Victoria
- Vișani
- Viziru
- Zăvoaia

==== Buzău County ====
- 2 municipalities, 3 towns and 82 communes

Municipalities

- Buzău - capital
- Râmnicu Sărat

Towns

- Nehoiu
- Pătârlagele
- Pogoanele

Communes

- Amaru
- Bălăceanu
- Balta Albă
- Beceni
- Berca
- Bisoca
- Blăjani
- Boldu
- Bozioru
- Brădeanu
- Brăești
- Breaza
- Buda
- C.A. Rosetti
- Calvini
- Cănești
- Cătina
- Cernătești
- Chiliile
- Chiojdu
- Cilibia
- Cislău
- Cochirleanca
- Colți
- Costești
- Cozieni
- Florica
- Gălbinași
- Gherăseni
- Ghergheasa
- Glodeanu Sărat
- Glodeanu-Siliștea
- Grebănu
- Gura Teghii
- Largu
- Lopătari
- Luciu
- Măgura
- Mărăcineni
- Mărgăritești
- Mânzălești
- Merei
- Mihăilești
- Movila Banului
- Murgești
- Năeni
- Odăile
- Padina
- Pardoși
- Pănătău
- Pârscov
- Pietroasele
- Podgoria
- Poșta Câlnău
- Puiești
- Racovițeni
- Râmnicelu
- Robeasca
- Rușețu
- Săgeata
- Săhăteni
- Săpoca
- Sărulești
- Scorțoasa
- Scutelnici
- Siriu
- Smeeni
- Stâlpu
- Tisău
- Topliceni
- Țintești
- Ulmeni
- Unguriu
- Vadu Pașii
- Valea Râmnicului
- Valea Salciei
- Vâlcelele
- Vernești
- Vintilă Vodă
- Viperești
- Zărnești
- Ziduri

==== Constanța County ====
- 3 municipalities, 9 towns and 58 communes

Municipalities

- Constanța - capital
- Mangalia
- Medgidia

Towns

- Băneasa
- Cernavodă
- Eforie
- Hârșova
- Murfatlar
- Năvodari
- Negru Vodă
- Ovidiu
- Techirghiol

Communes

- 23 August
- Adamclisi
- Agigea
- Albești
- Aliman
- Amzacea
- Bărăganu
- Castelu
- Cerchezu
- Chirnogeni
- Ciobanu
- Ciocârlia
- Cobadin
- Cogealac
- Comana
- Corbu
- Costinești
- Crucea
- Cumpăna
- Cuza Vodă
- Deleni
- Dobromir
- Dumbrăveni
- Fântânele
- Gârliciu
- Ghindărești
- Grădina
- Horia
- Independența
- Ion Corvin
- Istria
- Limanu
- Lipnița
- Lumina
- Mereni
- Mihai Viteazu
- Mihail Kogălniceanu
- Mircea Vodă
- Nicolae Bălcescu
- Oltina
- Ostrov
- Pantelimon
- Pecineaga
- Peștera
- Poarta Albă
- Rasova
- Saligny
- Saraiu
- Săcele
- Seimeni
- Siliștea
- Târgușor
- Topalu
- Topraisar
- Tortoman
- Tuzla
- Valu lui Traian
- Vulturu

==== Galați County ====
- 2 municipalities, 2 towns and 61 communes

Municipalities

- Galați - capital
- Tecuci

Towns

- Berești
- Târgu Bujor

Communes

- Bălăbănești
- Bălășești
- Băleni
- Băneasa
- Barcea
- Berești-Meria
- Brăhășești
- Braniștea
- Buciumeni
- Cavadinești
- Cerțești
- Corni
- Corod
- Cosmești
- Costache Negri
- Cuca
- Cudalbi
- Cuza Vodă
- Drăgănești
- Drăgușeni
- Fârțănești
- Foltești
- Frumușița
- Fundeni
- Ghidigeni
- Gohor
- Grivița
- Independența
- Ivești
- Jorăști
- Liești
- Măstăcani
- Matca
- Movileni
- Munteni
- Nămoloasa
- Negrilești
- Nicorești
- Oancea
- Pechea
- Piscu
- Poiana
- Priponești
- Rădești
- Rediu
- Scânteiești
- Schela
- Șendreni
- Slobozia Conachi
- Smârdan
- Smulți
- Suceveni
- Suhurlui
- Țepu
- Tudor Vladimirescu
- Tulucești
- Umbrărești
- Valea Mărului
- Vânători
- Vârlezi
- Vlădești

==== Tulcea County ====
- 1 municipality, 4 towns and 46 communes

Municipalities

- Tulcea - capital

Towns

- Babadag
- Isaccea
- Măcin
- Sulina

Communes

- Baia
- Beidaud
- Beștepe
- C. A. Rosetti
- Carcaliu
- Casimcea
- Ceamurlia de Jos
- Ceatalchioi
- Cerna
- Chilia Veche
- Ciucurova
- Crișan
- Dăeni
- Dorobanțu
- Frecăței
- Greci
- Grindu
- Hamcearca
- Horia
- I. C. Brătianu (Zaclău, 23 August)
- Izvoarele
- Jijila
- Jurilovca (Unirea)
- Luncavița
- Mahmudia
- Maliuc
- Mihai Bravu
- Mihai Kogălniceanu
- Murighiol (Independența)
- Nalbant
- Niculițel
- Nufăru
- Ostrov
- Pardina (1 Mai)
- Peceneaga
- Sarichioi
- Sfântu Gheorghe
- Slava Cercheză
- Smârdan
- Somova
- Stejaru
- Topolog
- Turcoaia
- Valea Nucarilor
- Valea Teilor
- Văcăreni

==== Vrancea County ====
- 2 municipalities, 3 towns and 68 communes

Municipalities

- Adjud
- Focșani - capital

Towns

- Mărășești
- Odobești
- Panciu

Communes

- Andreiașu de Jos
- Bălești
- Bârsești
- Biliești
- Boghești
- Bolotești
- Bordești
- Broșteni
- Câmpineanca
- Câmpuri
- Cârligele
- Chiojdeni
- Ciorăști
- Corbița
- Cotești
- Dumbrăveni
- Dumitrești
- Fitionești
- Garoafa
- Golești
- Gologanu
- Gugești
- Gura Caliței
- Homocea
- Jariștea
- Jitia
- Măicănești
- Mera
- Milcovul
- Movilița
- Nănești
- Năruja
- Negrilești
- Nereju
- Nistorești
- Obrejița
- Paltin
- Păulești
- Păunești
- Ploscuțeni
- Poiana Cristei
- Popești
- Pufești
- Răcoasa
- Răstoaca
- Reghiu
- Ruginești
- Sihlea
- Slobozia Bradului
- Slobozia Ciorăști
- Soveja
- Spulber
- Străoane
- Suraia
- Tâmboești
- Tănăsoaia
- Tătăranu
- Tulnici
- Țifești
- Urechești
- Valea Sării
- Vânători
- Vârteșcoiu
- Vidra
- Vintileasca
- Vizantea-Livezi
- Vrâncioaia
- Vulturu

== Macroregiunea 3 ==
=== South Romania-Muntenia ===
==== Argeș County ====
- 3 municipalities, 4 towns and 95 communes

Municipalities

- Câmpulung
- Curtea de Argeș
- Pitești - capital

Towns

- Costești
- Mioveni
- Ștefănești
- Topoloveni

Communes

- Albeștii de Argeș
- Albeștii de Muscel
- Albota
- Aninoasa
- Arefu
- Băbana
- Băiculești
- Bălilești
- Bârla
- Bascov
- Beleți-Negrești
- Berevoești
- Bogați
- Boteni
- Boțești
- Bradu
- Brăduleț
- Budeasa
- Bughea de Jos
- Bughea de Sus
- Buzoești
- Căldăraru
- Călinești
- Căteasca
- Cepari
- Cetățeni
- Cicănești
- Ciofrângeni
- Ciomăgești
- Cocu
- Corbeni
- Corbi
- Coșești
- Cotmeana
- Cuca
- Dâmbovicioara
- Dârmănești
- Davidești
- Dobrești
- Domnești
- Drăganu
- Dragoslavele
- Godeni
- Hârsești
- Hârtiești
- Izvoru
- Leordeni
- Lerești
- Lunca Corbului
- Mălureni
- Mărăcineni
- Merișani
- Micești
- Mihăești
- Mioarele
- Miroși
- Morărești
- Moșoaia
- Mozăceni
- Mușătești
- Negrași
- Nucșoara
- Oarja
- Pietroșani
- Poiana Lacului
- Poienarii de Argeș
- Poienarii de Muscel
- Popești
- Priboieni
- Râca
- Rătești
- Recea
- Rociu
- Rucăr
- Sălătrucu
- Săpata
- Schitu Golești
- Slobozia
- Stâlpeni
- Ștefan cel Mare
- Stoenești
- Stolnici
- Șuici
- Suseni
- Teiu
- Tigveni
- Țițești
- Uda
- Ungheni
- Valea Danului
- Valea Iașului
- Valea Mare-Pravăț
- Vedea
- Vlădești
- Vulturești

==== Călărași County ====
- 2 municipalities, 3 towns and 50 communes

Municipalities

- Călărași - capital
- Oltenița

Towns

- Budești
- Fundulea
- Lehliu Gară

Communes

- Alexandru Odobescu
- Belciugatele
- Borcea
- Căscioarele
- Chirnogi
- Chiselet
- Crivăț
- Ciocănești
- Curcani
- Cuza Vodă
- Dichiseni
- Dor Mărunt
- Dorobanțu
- Dragalina
- Dragoș Vodă
- Frăsinet
- Frumușani
- Fundeni
- Gălbinași
- Grădiștea
- Gurbănești
- Ileana
- Independența
- Jegălia
- Lehliu
- Luica
- Lupșanu
- Mânăstirea
- Mitreni
- Modelu
- Nana
- Nicolae Bălcescu
- Perișoru
- Plătărești
- Radovanu
- Roseți
- Sărulești
- Sohatu
- Spanțov
- Șoldanu
- Ștefan cel Mare
- Ștefan Vodă
- Tămădău Mare
- Ulmeni
- Ulmu
- Unirea
- Valea Argovei
- Vasilați
- Vâlcelele
- Vlad Țepeș

==== Dâmbovița County ====
- 2 municipalities, 5 towns and 82 communes

Municipalities

- Moreni
- Târgoviște - capital

Towns

- Fieni
- Găești
- Pucioasa
- Răcari
- Titu

Communes

- Aninoasa
- Băleni
- Bărbulețu
- Bezdead
- Bilciurești
- Braniștea
- Brănești
- Brezoaele
- Buciumeni
- Bucșani
- Butimanu
- Cândești
- Ciocănești
- Cobia
- Cojasca
- Comișani
- Conțești
- Corbii Mari
- Cornățelu
- Cornești
- Costeștii din Vale
- Crângurile
- Crevedia
- Dărmănești
- Dobra
- Doicești
- Dragodana
- Dragomirești
- Finta
- Glodeni
- Gura Foii
- Gura Ocniței
- Gura Șuții
- Hulubești
- I. L. Caragiale
- Iedera
- Lucieni
- Ludești
- Lungulețu
- Malu cu Flori
- Mănești
- Mătăsaru
- Mogoșani
- Moroeni
- Morteni
- Moțăieni
- Niculești
- Nucet
- Ocnița
- Odobești
- Perșinari
- Pietrari
- Petrești
- Pietroșița
- Poiana
- Potlogi
- Produlești
- Pucheni
- Raciu
- Răscăeți
- Răzvad
- Râu Alb
- Runcu
- Sălcioara
- Slobozia Moară
- Șelaru, Dâmbovița
- Șotânga
- Tărtășești
- Tătărani
- Uliești
- Ulmi
- Văcărești
- Valea Lungă
- Valea Mare
- Văleni-Dâmbovița
- Vârfuri
- Vișina
- Vișinești
- Vlădeni
- Voinești
- Vulcana-Băi
- Vulcana-Pandele

==== Giurgiu County ====
- 1 municipality, 2 towns and 51 communes

Municipalities

- Giurgiu - capital

Towns

- Bolintin-Vale
- Mihăilești

Communes

- Adunații-Copăceni
- Băneasa
- Bolintin-Deal
- Bucșani
- Bulbucata
- Buturugeni
- Călugăreni
- Clejani
- Colibași
- Comana
- Cosoba
- Crevedia Mare
- Daia
- Florești-Stoenești
- Frătești
- Găiseni
- Găujani
- Ghimpați
- Gogoșari
- Gostinari
- Gostinu
- Grădinari
- Greaca
- Herăști
- Hotarele
- Iepurești
- Isvoarele
- Izvoarele
- Joița
- Letca Nouă
- Malu
- Mârșa
- Mihai Bravu
- Ogrezeni
- Oinacu
- Prundu
- Putineiu
- Răsuceni
- Roata de Jos
- Săbăreni
- Schitu
- Singureni
- Slobozia
- Stănești
- Stoenești
- Toporu
- Ulmi
- Valea Dragului
- Vânătorii Mici
- Vărăști
- Vedea

==== Ialomița County ====
- 3 municipalities, 4 towns and 59 communes

Municipalities

- Fetești
- Slobozia - capital
- Urziceni

Towns

- Amara
- Căzănești
- Fierbinți-Târg
- Țăndărei

Communes

- Adâncata
- Albești
- Alexeni
- Andrășești
- Armășești
- Axintele
- Balaciu
- Bărbulești
- Bărcănești
- Borănești
- Bordușani
- Bucu
- Buești
- Ciocârlia
- Ciochina
- Ciulnița
- Cocora
- Colelia
- Cosâmbești
- Coșereni
- Drăgoești
- Dridu
- Făcăeni
- Gârbovi
- Gheorghe Doja
- Gheorghe Lazăr
- Giurgeni
- Grindu
- Grivița
- Gura Ialomiței
- Ion Roată
- Jilavele
- Maia
- Manasia
- Mărculești
- Mihail Kogălniceanu
- Miloșești
- Moldoveni
- Movila
- Movilița
- Munteni-Buzău
- Ograda
- Perieți
- Platonești
- Rădulești
- Reviga
- Roșiori
- Sălcioara
- Sărățeni
- Săveni
- Scânteia
- Sfântu Gheorghe
- Sinești
- Stelnica
- Sudiți
- Traian
- Valea Ciorii
- Valea Măcrișului
- Vlădeni

==== Prahova County ====
- 2 municipalities, 12 towns and 90 communes

Municipalities

- Câmpina
- Ploiești - capital

Towns

- Azuga
- Băicoi
- Boldești-Scăeni
- Breaza
- Bușteni
- Comarnic
- Mizil
- Plopeni
- Sinaia
- Slănic
- Urlați
- Vălenii de Munte

Communes

- Adunați
- Albești-Paleologu
- Aluniș
- Apostolache
- Ariceștii Rahtivani
- Ariceștii Zeletin
- Baba Ana
- Balta Doamnei
- Bălțești
- Bănești
- Bărcănești
- Bătrâni
- Berceni
- Bertea
- Blejoi
- Boldești-Grădiștea
- Brazi
- Brebu
- Bucov
- Călugăreni
- Cărbunești
- Ceptura
- Cerașu
- Chiojdeanca
- Ciorani
- Cocorăștii Mislii
- Cocorăștii Colț
- Colceag
- Cornu
- Cosminele
- Drăgănești
- Drajna
- Dumbrava
- Dumbrăvești
- Filipeștii de Pădure
- Filipeștii de Târg
- Fântânele
- Florești
- Fulga
- Gherghița
- Gorgota
- Gornet
- Gornet-Cricov
- Gura Vadului
- Gura Vitioarei
- Iordăcheanu
- Izvoarele
- Jugureni
- Lapoș
- Lipănești
- Măgurele
- Măgureni
- Măneciu
- Mănești
- Olari
- Păcureți
- Păulești
- Plopu
- Podenii Noi
- Poiana Câmpina
- Poienarii Burchii
- Posești
- Predeal-Sărari
- Provița de Jos
- Provița de Sus
- Puchenii Mari
- Râfov
- Salcia
- Sălciile
- Scorțeni
- Secăria
- Sângeru
- Șirna
- Șoimari
- Șotrile
- Starchiojd
- Ștefești
- Surani
- Talea
- Tătaru
- Teișani
- Telega
- Tinosu
- Târgșoru Vechi
- Tomșani
- Vadu Săpat
- Valea Călugărească
- Valea Doftanei
- Vărbilău
- Vâlcănești

==== Teleorman County ====
- 3 municipalities, 2 towns and 92 communes

Municipalities

- Alexandria - capital
- Roșiorii de Vede
- Turnu Măgurele

Towns

- Videle
- Zimnicea - the southernmost locality in Romania

Communes

- Băbăița
- Balaci
- Beciu
- Beuca
- Blejești
- Bogdana
- Botoroaga
- Bragadiru
- Brânceni
- Bujoreni
- Bujoru
- Buzescu
- Călinești
- Călmățuiu
- Călmățuiu de Sus
- Cervenia
- Ciolănești
- Ciuperceni
- Conțești
- Cosmești
- Crângu
- Crevenicu
- Crângeni
- Didești
- Dobrotești
- Dracea
- Drăcșenei
- Drăgănești de Vede
- Drăgănești-Vlașca
- Fântânele
- Frăsinet
- Frumoasa
- Furculești
- Gălăteni
- Gratia
- Islaz
- Izvoarele
- Lisa
- Lița
- Lunca
- Măgura
- Măldăeni
- Mârzănești
- Mavrodin
- Mereni
- Moșteni
- Nanov
- Năsturelu
- Necșești
- Nenciulești
- Olteni
- Orbeasca
- Peretu
- Piatra
- Pietroșani
- Plopii-Slăvitești
- Plosca
- Poeni
- Poroschia
- Purani
- Putineiu
- Rădoiești
- Răsmirești
- Săceni
- Saelele
- Salcia
- Sârbeni
- Scrioaștea
- Scurtu Mare
- Seaca
- Segarcea-Vale
- Sfințești
- Siliștea
- Siliștea Gumești
- Slobozia Mândra
- Smârdioasa
- Stejaru
- Ștorobăneasa
- Suhaia
- Talpa
- Tătărăștii de Jos
- Tătărăștii de Sus
- Țigănești
- Traian
- Trivalea-Moșteni
- Troianul
- Uda-Clocociov
- Vârtoape
- Vedea
- Viișoara
- Vitănești
- Zâmbreasca

=== Greater Bucharest-Ilfov ===
==== Bucharest ====
Municipalities

- Bucharest - national capital of Romania

==== Ilfov County ====
- 8 towns and 32 communes

Towns

- Bragadiru
- Buftea
- Chitila
- Măgurele
- Otopeni
- Pantelimon
- Popești-Leordeni
- Voluntari

Communes

- 1 Decembrie
- Afumați
- Balotești
- Berceni
- Brănești
- Cernica
- Chiajna
- Ciolpani
- Ciorogârla
- Clinceni
- Copăceni, Ilfov
- Corbeanca
- Cornetu
- Dărăști-Ilfov
- Dascălu
- Dobroești
- Domnești
- Dragomirești-Vale
- Găneasa
- Glina
- Grădiștea
- Gruiu
- Jilava
- Moara Vlăsiei
- Mogoșoaia
- Nuci
- Periș
- Petrăchioaia
- Snagov
- Ștefăneștii de Jos
- Tunari
- Vidra

== Macroregiunea 4 ==
=== South-West Romania-Oltenia ===
==== Dolj County ====
- 3 municipalities, 4 towns and 104 communes

Municipalities

- Băilești
- Calafat
- Craiova - capital

Towns

- Bechet
- Dăbuleni
- Filiași
- Segarcea

Communes

- Afumați
- Almăj
- Amărăștii de Jos
- Amărăștii de Sus
- Apele Vii
- Argetoaia
- Bârca
- Bistreț
- Botoșești-Paia
- Brabova
- Brădești
- Braloștița
- Bratovoești
- Breasta
- Bucovăț
- Bulzești
- Călărași
- Calopăr
- Caraula
- Cârcea
- Cârna
- Carpen
- Castranova
- Catane
- Celaru
- Cerăt
- Cernătești
- Cetate
- Cioroiași
- Ciupercenii Noi
- Coșoveni
- Coțofenii din Dos
- Coțofenii din Față
- Daneți
- Desa
- Dioști
- Dobrești
- Dobrotești
- Drăgotești
- Drănic
- Fărcaș
- Galicea Mare
- Galiciuica
- Gângiova
- Ghercești
- Ghidici
- Ghindeni
- Gighera
- Giubega
- Giurgița
- Gogoșu
- Goicea
- Goiești
- Grecești
- Întorsura
- Ișalnița
- Izvoare
- Leu
- Lipovu
- Măceșu de Jos
- Măceșu de Sus
- Maglavit
- Malu Mare
- Mârșani
- Melinești
- Mischii
- Moțăței
- Murgași
- Negoi
- Orodel
- Ostroveni
- Perișor
- Pielești
- Piscu Vechi
- Plenița
- Pleșoi
- Podari
- Poiana Mare
- Predești
- Radovan
- Rast
- Robănești
- Rojiște
- Sadova
- Sălcuța
- Scăești
- Seaca de Câmp
- Seaca de Pădure
- Secu
- Siliștea Crucii
- Șimnicu de Sus
- Sopot
- Tălpaș
- Teasc
- Terpezița
- Teslui
- Țuglui
- Unirea
- Urzicuța
- Valea Stanciului
- Vârtop
- Vârvoru de Jos
- Vela
- Verbița

==== Gorj County ====
- 2 municipalities, 7 towns and 61 communes

Municipalities

- Motru
- Târgu Jiu - capital

Towns

- Bumbești-Jiu
- Novaci
- Rovinari
- Târgu Cărbunești
- Țicleni
- Tismana
- Turceni

Communes

- Albeni
- Alimpești
- Aninoasa
- Arcani
- Baia de Fier
- Bălănești
- Bălești
- Bărbătești
- Bengești-Ciocadia
- Berlești
- Bâlteni
- Bolboși
- Borăscu
- Brănești
- Bumbești-Pițic
- Bustuchin
- Câlnic
- Căpreni
- Cătunele
- Ciuperceni
- Crasna
- Crușeț
- Dănciulești
- Dănești
- Drăgotești
- Drăguțești
- Fărcășești
- Glogova
- Godinești
- Hurezani
- Ionești
- Jupânești
- Lelești
- Licurici
- Logrești
- Mătăsari
- Mușetești
- Negomir
- Padeș
- Peștișani
- Plopșoru
- Polovragi
- Prigoria
- Roșia de Amaradia
- Runcu
- Săcelu
- Samarinești
- Săulești
- Schela
- Scoarța
- Slivilești
- Stănești
- Stejari
- Stoina
- Țânțăreni
- Telești
- Turburea
- Turcinești
- Urdari
- Văgiulești
- Vladimir

==== Mehedinți County ====
- 2 municipalities, 3 towns and 61 communes

Municipalities

- Drobeta-Turnu Severin - capital
- Orșova

Towns

- Baia de Aramă
- Strehaia
- Vânju Mare

Communes

- Bâcleș
- Bala
- Bălăcița
- Balta
- Bâlvănești
- Braniștea
- Breznița-Motru
- Breznița-Ocol
- Broșteni
- Burila Mare
- Butoiești
- Căzănești
- Cireșu
- Corcova
- Corlățel
- Cujmir
- Dârvari
- Devesel
- Dubova
- Dumbrava
- Eșelnița
- Florești
- Gârla Mare
- Godeanu
- Gogoșu
- Greci
- Grozești
- Gruia
- Hinova
- Husnicioara
- Ilovăț
- Ilovița
- Isverna
- Izvoru Bârzii
- Jiana
- Livezile
- Malovăț
- Obârșia de Câmp
- Obârșia-Cloșani
- Oprișor
- Pădina Mare
- Pătulele
- Podeni
- Ponoarele
- Poroina Mare
- Pristol
- Prunișor
- Punghina
- Rogova
- Salcia
- Șișești
- Șimian
- Șovarna
- Stângăceaua
- Svinița
- Tâmna
- Vânători
- Vânjuleț
- Vlădaia
- Voloiac
- Vrata

==== Olt County ====
- 2 municipalities, 6 towns and 104 communes

Municipalities

- Caracal
- Slatina - capital

Towns

- Balș
- Corabia
- Drăgănești-Olt
- Piatra-Olt
- Potcoava
- Scornicești

Communes

- Băbiciu
- Baldovinești
- Bălteni
- Bărăști
- Bârza
- Bobicești
- Brâncoveni
- Brastavățu
- Brebeni
- Bucinișu
- Cârlogani
- Călui
- Cezieni
- Cilieni
- Colonești
- Corbu
- Coteana
- Crâmpoia
- Cungrea
- Curtișoara
- Dăneasa
- Deveselu
- Dobrețu
- Dobrosloveni
- Dobroteasa
- Dobrun
- Drăghiceni
- Făgețelu
- Fălcoiu
- Fărcașele
- Găneasa
- Găvănești
- Gârcov
- Giuvărăști
- Ghimpețeni
- Gostavățu
- Grădinari
- Grădinile
- Grojdibodu
- Gura Padinii
- Ianca
- Iancu Jianu
- Icoana
- Ipotești
- Izbiceni
- Izvoarele
- Leleasca
- Mărunței
- Mihăești
- Milcov
- Morunglav
- Movileni
- Nicolae Titulescu
- Obârșia
- Oboga
- Oporelu
- Optași-Măgura
- Orlea
- Osica de Sus
- Osica de Jos
- Pârșcoveni
- Perieți
- Pleșoiu
- Poboru
- Priseaca
- Radomirești
- Redea
- Rotunda
- Rusănești
- Sâmburești
- Sârbii-Măgura
- Scărișoara
- Schitu
- Seaca
- Șerbănești
- Slătioara
- Șopârlița
- Spineni
- Sprâncenata
- Ștefan cel Mare
- Stoenești
- Stoicănești
- Strejești
- Studina
- Tătulești
- Teslui
- Tia Mare
- Topana
- Traian
- Tufeni
- Urzica
- Vădastra
- Vădăstrița
- Vâlcele
- Valea Mare
- Văleni
- Verguleasa
- Vișina
- Vișina Nouă
- Vitomirești
- Vlădila
- Voineasa
- Vulpeni
- Vulturești

==== Vâlcea County ====
- 2 municipalities, 9 towns and 78 communes

Municipalities

- Drăgășani
- Râmnicu Vâlcea - capital

Towns

- Băbeni
- Băile Govora
- Băile Olănești
- Bălcești
- Berbești
- Brezoi
- Călimănești
- Horezu
- Ocnele Mari

Communes

- Alunu
- Amărăști
- Bărbătești
- Berislăvești
- Boișoara
- Budești
- Bujoreni
- Bunești
- Câineni
- Cernișoara
- Copăceni
- Costești
- Crețeni
- Dăești
- Dănicei
- Diculești
- Drăgoești
- Fârtățești
- Făurești
- Frâncești
- Galicea
- Ghioroiu
- Glăvile
- Golești
- Grădiștea
- Gușoeni
- Ionești
- Lăcusteni
- Lădești
- Laloșu
- Lăpușata
- Livezi
- Lungești
- Măciuca
- Mădulari
- Malaia
- Măldărești
- Mateești
- Mihăești
- Milcoiu
- Mitrofani
- Muereasca
- Nicolae Bălcescu
- Olanu
- Orlești
- Oteșani
- Păușești
- Păușești-Măglași
- Perișani
- Pesceana
- Pietrari
- Popești
- Prundeni
- Racovița
- Roești
- Roșiile
- Runcu
- Sălătrucel
- Scundu
- Sinești
- Șirineasa
- Slătioara
- Stănești
- Ștefănești
- Stoenești
- Stoilești
- Stroești
- Șușani
- Sutești
- Tetoiu
- Titești
- Tomșani
- Vaideeni
- Valea Mare
- Vlădești
- Voicești
- Voineasa
- Zătreni

=== West Romania ===
==== Arad County ====
- 1 municipality, 9 towns and 68 communes

Municipalities

- Arad - capital

Towns

- Chișineu-Criș
- Curtici
- Ineu
- Lipova
- Nădlac
- Pâncota
- Pecica
- Sântana
- Sebiș

Communes

- Almaș
- Apateu
- Archiș
- Bata
- Bârsa
- Bârzava
- Beliu
- Birchiș
- Bocsig
- Brazii
- Buteni
- Cărand
- Cermei
- Chisindia
- Conop
- Covăsânț
- Craiva
- Dezna
- Dieci
- Dorobanți
- Fântânele
- Felnac
- Frumușeni
- Ghioroc
- Grăniceri
- Gurahonț
- Hălmagiu
- Hălmăgel
- Hășmaș
- Ignești
- Iratoșu
- Livada
- Macea
- Mișca
- Moneasa
- Olari
- Păuliș
- Peregu Mare
- Petriș
- Pilu
- Pleșcuța
- Săvârșin
- Secusigiu
- Seleuș
- Semlac
- Sintea Mare
- Socodor
- Șagu
- Șeitin
- Șepreuș
- Șicula
- Șilindia
- Șimand
- Șiria
- Șiștarovăț
- Șofronea
- Tauț
- Târnova
- Ususău
- Vărădia de Mureș
- Vârfurile
- Vinga
- Vladimirescu
- Zăbrani
- Zădăreni
- Zărand
- Zerind
- Zimandu Nou

==== Caraș-Severin County ====
- 2 municipalities, 6 towns and 69 communes

Municipalities

- Caransebeș
- Reșița - capital

Towns

- Anina
- Băile Herculane
- Bocșa
- Moldova Nouă
- Oravița
- Oțelu Roșu

Communes

- Armeniș
- Bănia
- Băuțar
- Berliște
- Berzasca
- Berzovia
- Bolvașnița
- Bozovici
- Brebu
- Brebu Nou
- Buchin
- Bucoșnița
- Carașova
- Cărbunari
- Ciclova Română
- Ciuchici
- Ciudanovița
- Constantin Daicoviciu
- Copăcele
- Cornea
- Cornereva
- Coronini
- Dalboșeț
- Doclin
- Dognecea
- Domașnea
- Eftimie Murgu
- Ezeriș
- Fârliug
- Forotic
- Gârnic
- Glimboca
- Goruia
- Grădinari
- Iablanița
- Lăpușnicel
- Lăpușnicu Mare
- Luncavița
- Lupac
- Marga
- Măureni
- Mehadia
- Mehadica
- Naidăș
- Obreja
- Ocna de Fier
- Păltiniș
- Pojejena
- Prigor
- Răcășdia
- Ramna
- Rusca Montană
- Sacu
- Sasca Montană
- Sichevița
- Slatina-Timiș
- Socol
- Șopotu Nou
- Târnova
- Teregova
- Ticvaniu Mare
- Topleț
- Turnu Ruieni
- Văliug
- Vărădia
- Vermeș
- Vrani
- Zăvoi
- Zorlențu Mare

==== Hunedoara County ====
- 7 municipalities, 7 towns and 55 communes

Municipalities

- Brad
- Deva - capital
- Hunedoara
- Lupeni
- Orăștie
- Petroșani
- Vulcan

Towns

- Aninoasa
- Călan
- Geoagiu
- Hațeg
- Petrila
- Simeria
- Uricani

Communes

- Baia de Criș
- Balșa
- Bănița
- Baru
- Băcia
- Băița
- Bătrâna
- Beriu
- Blăjeni
- Boșorod
- Brănișca
- Bretea Română
- Buceș
- Bucureșci
- Bulzeștii de Sus
- Bunila
- Burjuc
- Cerbăl
- Certeju de Sus
- Cârjiți
- Crișcior
- Densuș
- Dobra
- General Berthelot
- Ghelari
- Gurasada
- Hărău
- Ilia
- Lăpugiu de Jos
- Lelese
- Lunca Cernii de Jos
- Luncoiu de Jos
- Mărtinești
- Orăștioara de Sus
- Pestișu Mic
- Pui
- Rapoltu Mare
- Răchitova
- Ribița
- Râu de Mori
- Romos
- Sarmizegetusa
- Sălașu de Sus
- Sântămăria-Orlea
- Șoimuș
- Teliucu Inferior
- Tomești
- Toplița
- Totești
- Turdaș
- Vața de Jos
- Vălișoara
- Vețel
- Vorța
- Zam

==== Timiș County ====
- 2 municipalities, 8 towns and 89 communes

Municipalities

- Lugoj
- Timișoara - capital

Towns

- Buziaș
- Ciacova
- Deta
- Făget
- Gătaia
- Jimbolia
- Recaș
- Sânnicolau Mare

Communes

- Balinț
- Banloc
- Bara
- Bârna
- Beba Veche
- Becicherecu Mic
- Belinț
- Bethausen
- Biled
- Birda
- Bogda
- Boldur
- Brestovăț
- Bucovăț
- Cărpiniș
- Cenad
- Cenei
- Checea
- Chevereșu Mare
- Comloșu Mare
- Coșteiu
- Criciova
- Curtea
- Darova
- Denta
- Dudeștii Noi
- Dudeștii Vechi
- Dumbrava
- Dumbrăvița
- Fârdea
- Fibiș
- Foeni
- Gavojdia
- Ghilad
- Ghiroda
- Ghizela
- Giarmata
- Giera
- Giroc
- Giulvăz
- Gottlob
- Iecea Mare
- Jamu Mare
- Jebel
- Lenauheim
- Liebling
- Livezile
- Lovrin
- Margina
- Mașloc
- Mănăștiur
- Moravița
- Moșnița Nouă
- Nădrag
- Nițchidorf
- Ohaba Lungă
- Orțișoara
- Otelec
- Parța
- Pădureni
- Peciu Nou
- Periam
- Pesac
- Pietroasa
- Pișchia
- Racovița
- Remetea Mare
- Sacoșu Turcesc
- Saravale
- Satchinez
- Săcălaz
- Sânandrei
- Sânmihaiu Român
- Sânpetru Mare
- Secaș
- Șag
- Șandra
- Știuca
- Teremia Mare
- Tomești
- Tomnatic
- Topolovățu Mare
- Tormac
- Traian Vuia
- Uivar
- Variaș
- Vălcani
- Victor Vlad Delamarina
- Voiteg

== See also ==
- Development regions of Romania
- Counties of Romania
- Cities of Romania
- Communes of Romania
- Municipalities of Romania
