= Drincea =

- Location within Romania

Location
- Country: Romania
- Counties: Mehedinți, Dolj
- Villages: Podu Grosului, Corlățel, Punghina, Cujmir

Physical characteristics
- Mouth: Danube
  - location: near Cetate
  - coordinates: 44.1012°N 22.9928°E
- Length: 79 km (49 mi)
- Basin size: 741 km^{2} (286 sq mi)

Basin features
- Progression: Danube→ Black Sea
- Tributaries
  - left: Drăgoaicea, Dobra, Saracov, Scorila
  - right: Osteșcova, Iablanița

The Drincea is a left tributary of the river Danube in Romania. It discharges into the Danube near Cetate. Its length is 79 km (49 mi) and its basin size is 741 km^{2} (286 sq mi).
