= Blahnița (Danube) =

- Location within Romania

Location
- Country: Romania
- Counties: Mehedinți County
- Villages: Izvoru Aneștilor, Livezile, Rogova, Pătulele, Balta Verde

Physical characteristics
- Mouth: Danube
  - coordinates: 44.3483°N 22.5521°E
- Length: 56 km (35 mi)
- Basin size: 555 km^{2} (214 sq mi)

Basin features
- Progression: Danube→ Black Sea
- Tributaries
  - left: Poroinița, Orevița

The Blahnița is a left tributary of the Danube in Romania. It flows into the Danube near Balta Verde. Its length is 56 km (35 mi) and its basin size is 555 km^{2} (214 sq mi).
