= Bâltanele =

Bâltanele may refer to several villages in Romania:

- Bâltanele, a village in Greci Commune, Mehedinţi County
- Bâltanele, a village in Prunișor Commune, Mehedinţi County
