= Măgurele (disambiguation) =

Măgurele is a town in Ilfov County, Romania.

Măgurele may also refer to:

- Turnu Măgurele, Teleorman County, Romania
- Măgurele, Prahova, a commune in Prahova County, Romania
- Măgurele, a village in Mărișelu Commune, Bistriţa-Năsăud County, Romania
- Măgurele, a village in Punghina Commune, Mehedinţi County, Romania
- Măgurele, a village in Topolog Commune, Tulcea County, Romania
- Măgurele, Ungheni, a commune in Ungheni district, Moldova
