= Almăjel =

Almăjel may refer to several villages in Romania:

- Almăjel, a district in the town of Filiaşi, Dolj County
- Almăjel, a village in Vlădaia Commune, Mehedinţi County
