= Hotărani =

Hotărani may refer to several villages in Romania:

- Hotărani, a village in Vânjuleț Commune, Mehedinți County
- Hotărani, a village in Fărcașele Commune, Olt County
