= Bălăcița =

- Commune
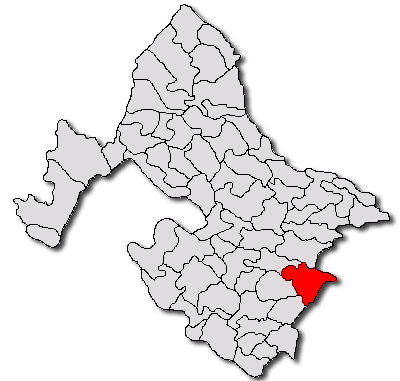
- Location in Mehedinți County

- Location in Romania
- Coordinates: 44°23′N 23°8′E
- Country: Romania
- County: Mehedinți
- Area: 98.95 km^{2} (38.20 sq mi)
- Population (2021-12-01): 2,078
  - Density: 21.00/km^{2} (54.39/sq mi)
- Time zone: UTC+02:00 (EET)
  - Summer (DST): UTC+03:00 (EEST)
- Vehicle reg.: MH

Bălăcița is a commune located in Mehedinți County, Romania. It is composed of three villages: Bălăcița, Dobra and Gvardinița . It is situated in the historical region of Oltenia.
