= Hinova =

- Commune
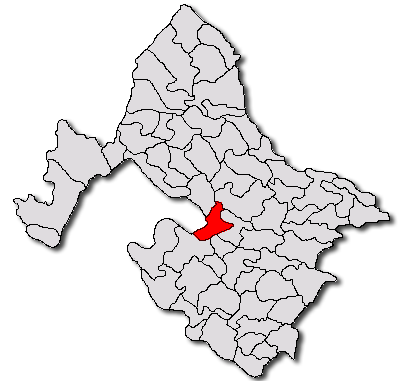
- Location in Mehedinți County

- Location in Romania
- Coordinates: 44°32′N 22°47′E
- Country: Romania
- County: Mehedinți
- Area: 60.13 km^{2} (23.22 sq mi)
- Population (2021-12-01): 2,526
  - Density: 42.01/km^{2} (108.8/sq mi)
- Time zone: UTC+02:00 (EET)
  - Summer (DST): UTC+03:00 (EEST)
- Vehicle reg.: MH

Hinova is a commune located in Mehedinți County, Oltenia, Romania. It is composed of four villages: Bistrița, Cârjei, Hinova and Ostrovu Corbului.
