= Obârșia-Cloșani =

- Commune
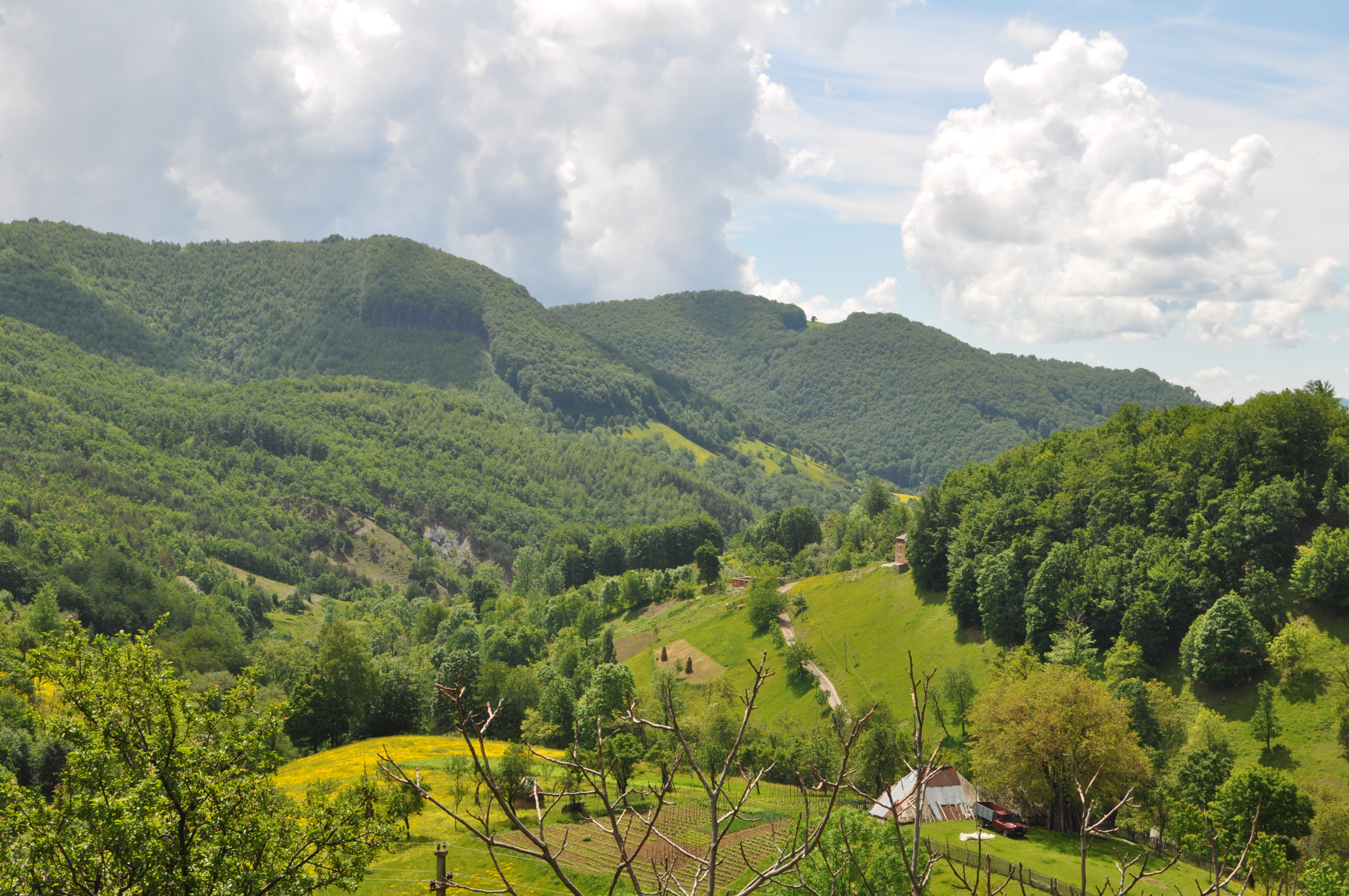
- Obârșia-Cloșani

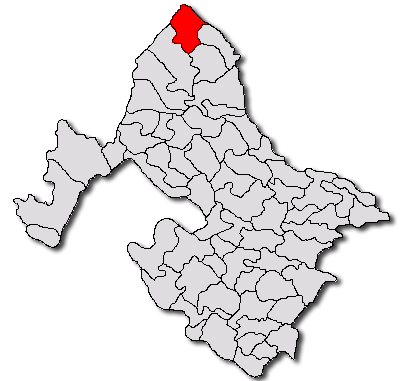
- Location in Mehedinți County

- Location in Romania
- Coordinates: 45°1′N 22°41′E
- Country: Romania
- County: Mehedinți

Government
  - Mayor (2020–2024): Iacob Murdeală (PNL)
- Area: 78.46 km^{2} (30.29 sq mi)
- Elevation: 488 m (1,601 ft)
- Population (2021-12-01): 881
  - Density: 11.2/km^{2} (29.1/sq mi)
- Time zone: UTC+02:00 (EET)
  - Summer (DST): UTC+03:00 (EEST)
- Postal code: 227330
- Area code: +(40) 252
- Vehicle reg.: MH
- Website: comunaobarsiaclosani.ro

Obârșia-Cloșani is a commune located in Mehedinți County, Oltenia, Romania. It is composed of two villages, Godeanu and Obârșia-Cloșani.

Historical population
| Year | Pop. | ±% |
|---|---|---|
| 1992 | 1,106 | — |
| 2002 | 1,126 | +1.8% |
| 2011 | 953 | −15.4% |
| 2021 | 881 | −7.6% |
Source: Census data
