= Broșteni, Mehedinți =

Broșteni
- Commune
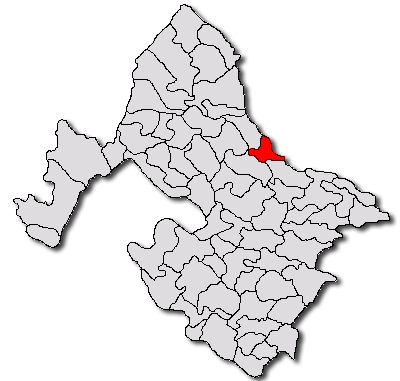
- Location in Mehedinți County

- Location in Romania
- Coordinates: 44°46′N 22°59′E
- Country: Romania
- County: Mehedinți
- Population (2021-12-01): 2,572
- Time zone: EET/EEST (UTC+2/+3)
- Vehicle reg.: MH

Broșteni is a commune located in Mehedinți County, Oltenia, Romania. It is composed of six villages: Broșteni, Căpățânești, Luncșoara, Lupșa de Jos, Lupșa de Sus and Meriș.
