= Breznița-Ocol =

- Commune
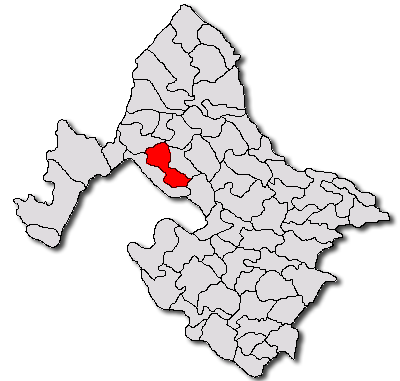
- Location in Mehedinți County

- Location in Romania
- Coordinates: 44°40′N 22°37′E
- Country: Romania
- County: Mehedinți
- Area: 75.54 km^{2} (29.17 sq mi)
- Population (2021-12-01): 3,826
  - Density: 50.65/km^{2} (131.2/sq mi)
- Time zone: UTC+02:00 (EET)
  - Summer (DST): UTC+03:00 (EEST)
- Vehicle reg.: MH

Breznița-Ocol (Serbian: Брезница-Околиште / Breznica-Okolište) is a commune located in Mehedinți County, Oltenia, Romania. It is composed of four villages: Breznița-Ocol, Jidoștița, Magheru (Serbian: Магерово / Magerovo) and Șușița (Serbian: Сушица / Sušica).
