= Obârșia de Câmp =

- Commune
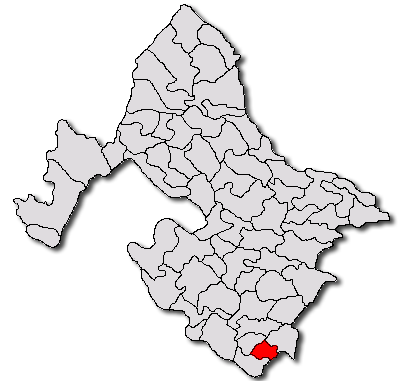
- Location in Mehedinți County

- Location in Romania
- Coordinates: 44°10′12″N 22°58′48″E
- Country: Romania
- County: Mehedinți

Government
  - Mayor (2021–2024): Marinela Dumitrele (PSD)
- Area: 31.07 km^{2} (12.00 sq mi)
- Elevation: 97 m (318 ft)
- Population (2021-12-01): 1,558
  - Density: 50/km^{2} (130/sq mi)
- Time zone: EET/EEST (UTC+2/+3)
- Postal code: 227325
- Area code: +(40) 252
- Vehicle reg.: MH
- Website: www.obarsiadecamp.ro

Obârșia de Câmp is a commune located in Mehedinți County, Oltenia, Romania. It is composed of two villages, Izimșa and Obârșia de Câmp.
