= Stângăceaua =

- Commune
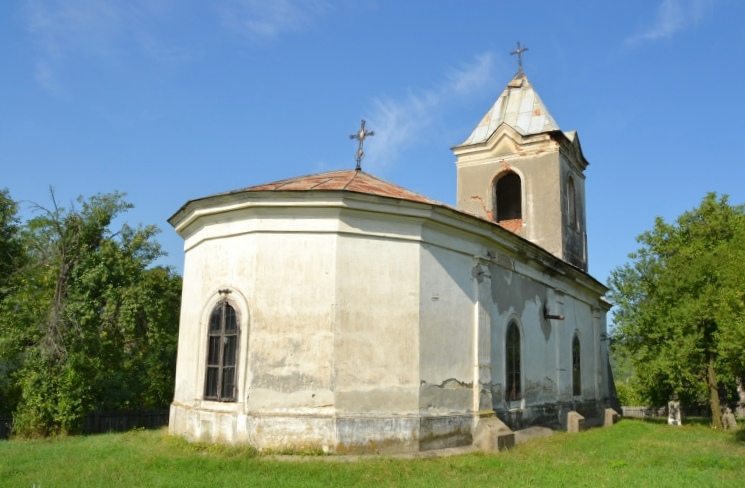
- Dormition of the Theotokos Church in Stângăceaua village

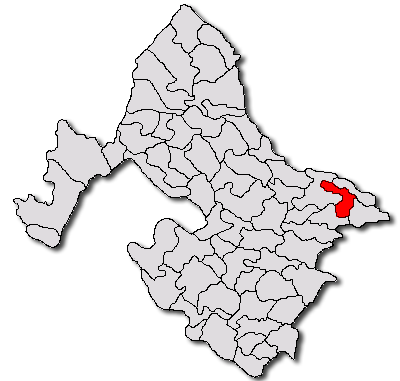
- Location in Mehedinți County

- Location in Romania
- Coordinates: 44°36′N 23°19′E
- Country: Romania
- County: Mehedinți

Government
  - Mayor (2020–2024): Vasile Buzatu (PSD)
- Area: 40.24 km^{2} (15.54 sq mi)
- Elevation: 159 m (522 ft)
- Population (2021-12-01): 1,120
  - Density: 27.8/km^{2} (72.1/sq mi)
- Time zone: UTC+02:00 (EET)
  - Summer (DST): UTC+03:00 (EEST)
- Postal code: 227430
- Area code: +(40) 252
- Vehicle reg.: MH
- Website: www.stangaceaua.ro

Stângăceaua is a commune located in Mehedinți County, Oltenia, Romania. It is composed of eight villages: Bârlogeni, Breznicioara, Cerânganul, Fața Motrului, Poșta Veche, Satu Mare, Stângăceaua, and Târsa.
