= Voloiac =

- Commune
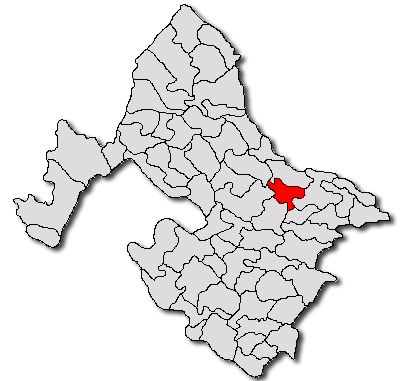
- Location in Mehedinți County

- Location in Romania
- Coordinates: 44°37′N 23°6′E
- Country: Romania
- County: Mehedinți
- Area: 47.94 km^{2} (18.51 sq mi)
- Population (2021-12-01): 1,420
  - Density: 30/km^{2} (77/sq mi)
- Time zone: EET/EEST (UTC+2/+3)
- Vehicle reg.: MH

Voloiac is a commune located in Mehedinți County, Oltenia, Romania. It is composed of eight villages: Cotoroaia, Lac, Ruptura, Sperlești, Țițirigi, Valea Bună, Voloiac and Voloicel.
