= Pădina Mare =

- Commune
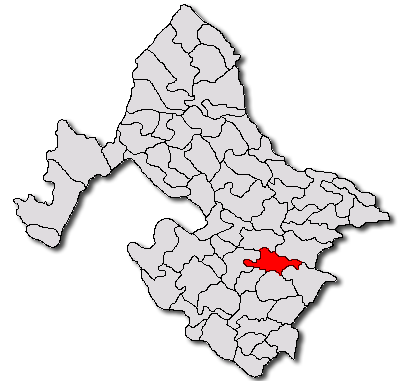
- Location in Mehedinți County

- Location in Romania
- Coordinates: 44°27′N 23°1′E
- Country: Romania
- County: Mehedinți
- Area: 73.33 km^{2} (28.31 sq mi)
- Population (2021-12-01): 1,073
  - Density: 14.63/km^{2} (37.90/sq mi)
- Time zone: UTC+02:00 (EET)
  - Summer (DST): UTC+03:00 (EEST)
- Vehicle reg.: MH

Pădina Mare is a commune located in Mehedinți County, Oltenia, Romania. It is composed of six villages: Biban, Iablanița, Olteanca, Pădina Mare, Pădina Mică and Slașoma.
