= Corcova =

- Commune
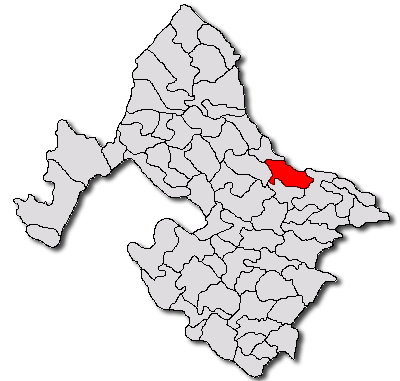
- Location in Mehedinți County

- Location in Romania
- Coordinates: 44°42′N 23°3′E
- Country: Romania
- County: Mehedinți
- Area: 58.58 km^{2} (22.62 sq mi)
- Population (2021-12-01): 5,429
  - Density: 92.68/km^{2} (240.0/sq mi)
- Time zone: UTC+02:00 (EET)
  - Summer (DST): UTC+03:00 (EEST)
- Vehicle reg.: MH

Corcova is a commune located in Mehedinți County, Oltenia, Romania. It is composed of thirteen villages: Breța, Cernaia, Corcova, Cordun, Croica, Gârbovățu de Jos, Imoasa, Jirov, Măru Roșu, Pârvulești, Pușcașu, Stejaru and Vlădășești.
