= Jiana =

- Commune
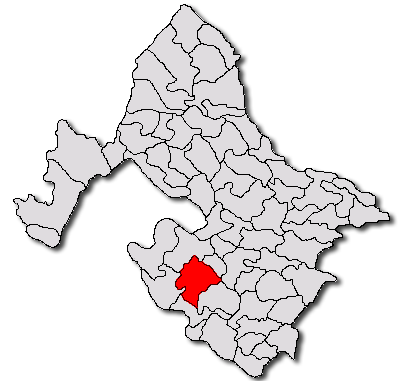
- Location in Mehedinți County

- Location in Romania
- Coordinates: 44°24′N 22°43′E
- Country: Romania
- County: Mehedinți
- Area: 65.77 km^{2} (25.39 sq mi)
- Population (2021-12-01): 4,184
  - Density: 63.62/km^{2} (164.8/sq mi)
- Time zone: UTC+02:00 (EET)
  - Summer (DST): UTC+03:00 (EEST)
- Vehicle reg.: MH

Jiana is a commune located in Mehedinți County, Oltenia, Romania. It is composed of five villages: Cioroboreni, Dănceu, Jiana, Jiana Mare and Jiana Veche.
