= Isverna =

- Commune
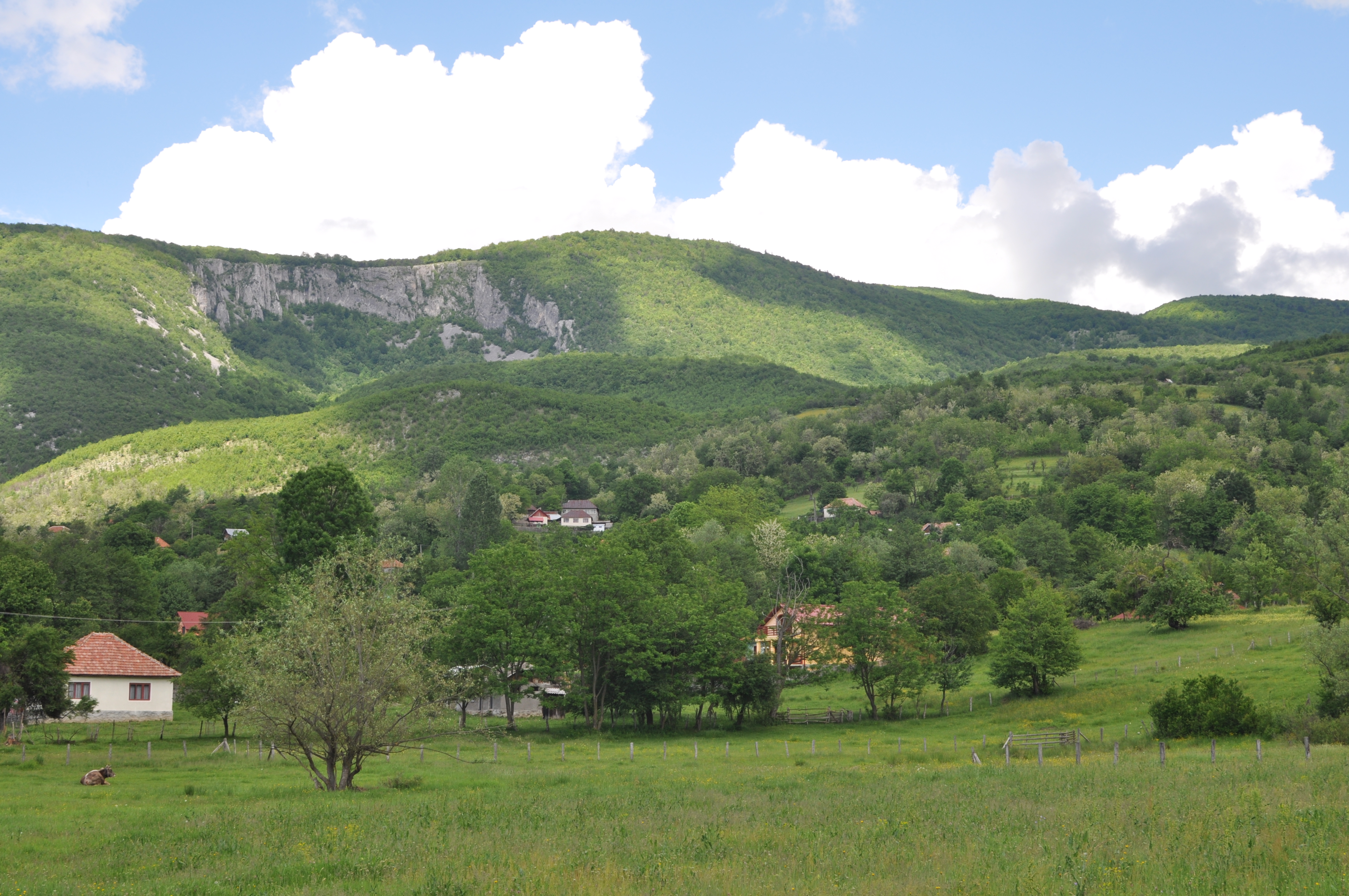

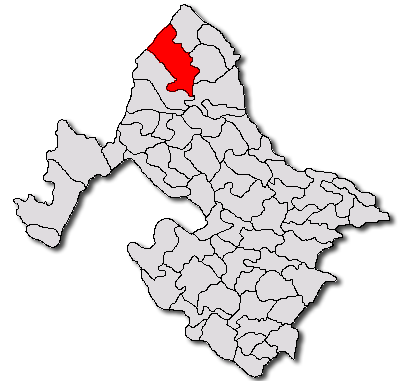
- Location in Mehedinți County

- Location in Romania
- Coordinates: 44°59′N 22°38′E
- Country: Romania
- County: Mehedinți

Government
  - Mayor (2020–2024): Ion Stoican (PSD)
- Area: 145.37 km^{2} (56.13 sq mi)
- Elevation: 452 m (1,483 ft)
- Population (2021-12-01): 2,069
  - Density: 14.23/km^{2} (36.86/sq mi)
- Time zone: UTC+02:00 (EET)
  - Summer (DST): UTC+03:00 (EEST)
- Postal code: 227285
- Area code: +(40) 252
- Vehicle reg.: MH
- Website: comunaisverna.ro

Isverna is a commune located in Mehedinți County, Oltenia, Romania. It is composed of eight villages: Busești, Cerna-Vârf, Drăghești, Giurgiani, Isverna, Nadanova, Seliștea, and Turtaba.
