= Căzănești, Mehedinți =

Căzănești
- Commune
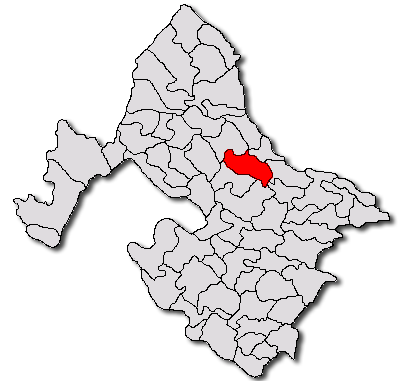
- Location in Mehedinți County

- Location in Romania
- Coordinates: 44°43′12″N 22°54′00″E
- Country: Romania
- County: Mehedinți
- Area: 84.64 km^{2} (32.68 sq mi)
- Population (2021-12-01): 2,006
  - Density: 23.70/km^{2} (61.38/sq mi)
- Time zone: UTC+02:00 (EET)
  - Summer (DST): UTC+03:00 (EEST)
- Vehicle reg.: MH

Căzănești is a commune located in Mehedinți County, Oltenia, Romania. It is composed of twelve villages: Căzănești, Ercea, Gârbovățu de Sus, Govodarva, Ilovu, Jignița, Păltinișu, Poiana, Roșia, Severinești, Suharu and Valea Coșuștei.
