= Devesel =

- Commune
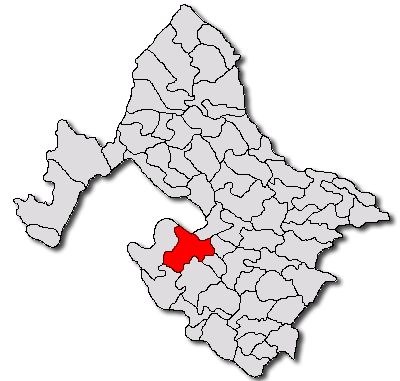
- Location in Mehedinți County

- Location in Romania
- Coordinates: 44°28′N 22°40′E
- Country: Romania
- County: Mehedinți
- Area: 104 km^{2} (40 sq mi)
- Population (2021-12-01): 3,029
  - Density: 29.1/km^{2} (75.4/sq mi)
- Time zone: UTC+02:00 (EET)
  - Summer (DST): UTC+03:00 (EEST)
- Vehicle reg.: MH

Devesel is a commune located in Mehedinți County, Oltenia, Romania. It is composed of six villages: Batoți, Bistrețu, Devesel, Dunărea Mică, Scăpău and Tismana.
