= Bâlvănești =

- Commune
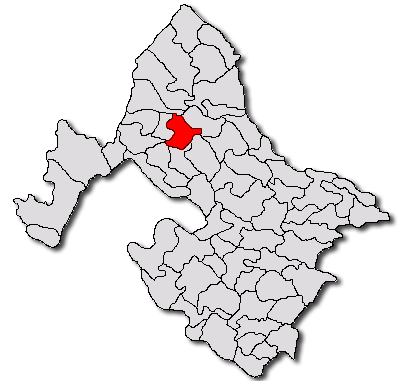
- Location in Mehedinți County

- Location in Romania
- Coordinates: 44°48′N 22°41′E
- Country: Romania
- County: Mehedinți
- Area: 48.04 km^{2} (18.55 sq mi)
- Population (2021-12-01): 815
  - Density: 17.0/km^{2} (43.9/sq mi)
- Time zone: UTC+02:00 (EET)
  - Summer (DST): UTC+03:00 (EEST)
- Vehicle reg.: MH

Bâlvănești is a commune located in Mehedinți County, Romania. It is composed of five villages: Bâlvănești, Băsești (Bâlvăneștii de Jos from 1968 to 2025), Călineștii de Jos, Călineștii de Sus and Pârlagele. It is situated in the historical region of Oltenia.
