= Salcia, Mehedinți =

Salcia
- Commune
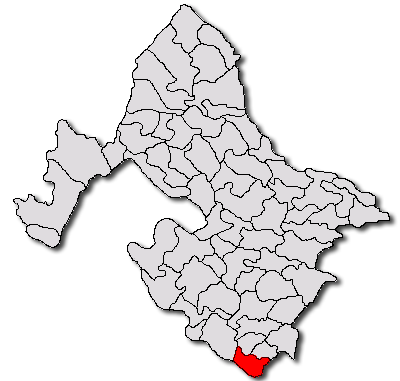
- Location in Mehedinți County

- Location in Romania
- Coordinates: 44.141°N 22.928°E
- Country: Romania
- County: Mehedinți
- Area: 63.14 km^{2} (24.38 sq mi)
- Population (2021-12-01): 2,416
  - Density: 38/km^{2} (99/sq mi)
- Time zone: EET/EEST (UTC+2/+3)
- Vehicle reg.: MH

Salcia is a commune located in Mehedinți County, Oltenia, Romania. It is composed of a single village, Salcia.
