= Pristol =

- Commune
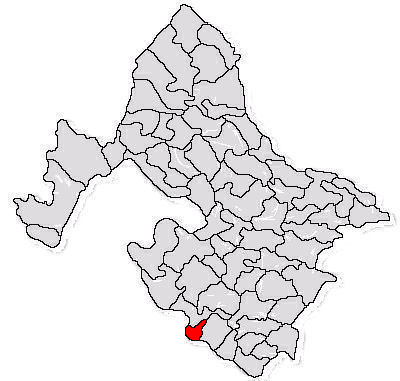
- Location in Mehedinți County

- Location in Romania
- Coordinates: 44°13′13″N 22°42′53″E
- Country: Romania
- County: Mehedinți
- Area: 35 km^{2} (14 sq mi)
- Population (2021-12-01): 1,254
  - Density: 36/km^{2} (93/sq mi)
- Time zone: UTC+02:00 (EET)
  - Summer (DST): UTC+03:00 (EEST)
- Vehicle reg.: MH

Pristol is a commune in Mehedinți County, Oltenia, Romania. It is composed of two villages, Cozia and Pristol.
