= Podeni =

- Commune
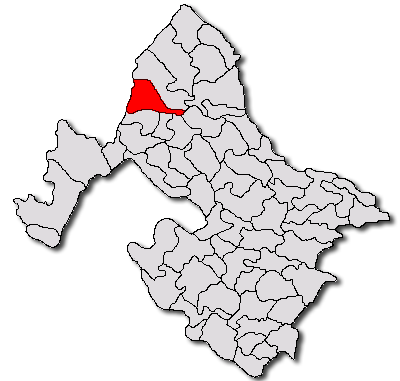
- Location in Mehedinți County

- Location in Romania
- Coordinates: 44°51′N 22°33′E
- Country: Romania
- County: Mehedinți
- Area: 76.84 km^{2} (29.67 sq mi)
- Population (2021-12-01): 686
  - Density: 8.93/km^{2} (23.1/sq mi)
- Time zone: UTC+02:00 (EET)
  - Summer (DST): UTC+03:00 (EEST)
- Vehicle reg.: MH

Podeni is a commune located in Mehedinți County, Oltenia, Romania. It is composed of three villages: Gornenți, Mălărișca and Podeni.
