= Breznița-Motru =

- Commune
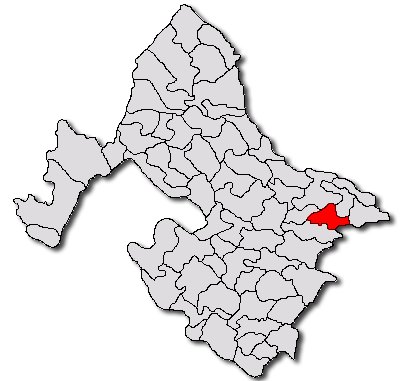
- Location in Mehedinți County

- Location in Romania
- Coordinates: 44°34′N 23°13′E
- Country: Romania
- County: Mehedinți
- Area: 51.13 km^{2} (19.74 sq mi)
- Population (2021-12-01): 1,155
  - Density: 22.59/km^{2} (58.51/sq mi)
- Time zone: UTC+02:00 (EET)
  - Summer (DST): UTC+03:00 (EEST)
- Vehicle reg.: MH

Breznița-Motru is a commune located in Mehedinți County, Romania. It is composed of seven villages: Breznița-Motru, Cosovăț, Deleni, Făuroaia, Plai, Tălăpanu and Valea Teiului. It is situated in the historical region of Oltenia.
