= Șovarna =

- Commune
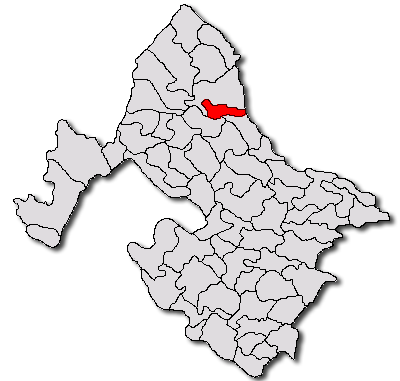
- Location in Mehedinți County

- Location in Romania
- Coordinates: 44°51′N 22°48′E
- Country: Romania
- County: Mehedinți

Government
  - Mayor (2024–2028): Constantin Prundeanu-Mică (PSD)
- Area: 36.66 km^{2} (14.15 sq mi)
- Elevation: 278 m (912 ft)
- Population (2021-12-01): 993
  - Density: 27.1/km^{2} (70.2/sq mi)
- Time zone: UTC+02:00 (EET)
  - Summer (DST): UTC+03:00 (EEST)
- Postal code: 227465
- Area code: +(40) 252
- Vehicle reg.: MH
- Website: www.primariasovarna.ro

Șovarna is a commune located in Mehedinți County, Oltenia, Romania. It is composed of three villages: Ohaba, Studina, and Șovarna.

Historical population
| Year | Pop. | ±% |
|---|---|---|
| 2002 | 1,450 | — |
| 2011 | 1,270 | −12.4% |
| 2021 | 993 | −21.8% |
Source: Census data

== Natives ==
- State Drăgănescu (1891–1964), physician and academic
