= Gruia, Mehedinți =

Gruia
- Commune
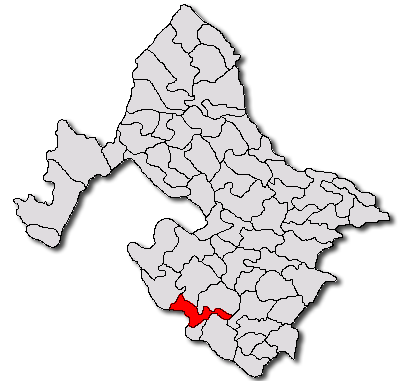
- Location in Mehedinți County

- Location in Romania
- Coordinates: 44°16′N 22°42′E
- Country: Romania
- County: Mehedinți
- Area: 73.18 km^{2} (28.25 sq mi)
- Population (2021-12-01): 2,824
  - Density: 38.59/km^{2} (99.95/sq mi)
- Time zone: UTC+02:00 (EET)
  - Summer (DST): UTC+03:00 (EEST)
- Vehicle reg.: MH

Gruia is a commune located in Mehedinți County, Oltenia, Romania. It is composed of three villages: Gruia, Izvoarele and Poiana Gruii.
