= Vlădaia =

- Commune
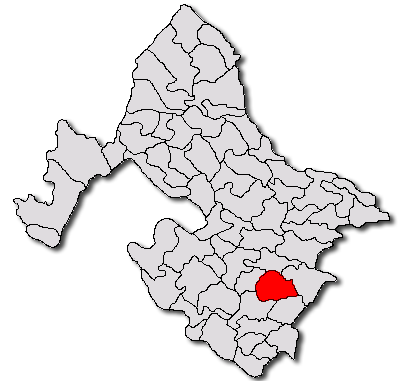
- Location in Mehedinți County

- Location in Romania
- Coordinates: 44°21′N 23°2′E
- Country: Romania
- County: Mehedinți
- Area: 86.46 km^{2} (33.38 sq mi)
- Population (2021-12-01): 1,372
  - Density: 16/km^{2} (41/sq mi)
- Time zone: EET/EEST (UTC+2/+3)
- Vehicle reg.: MH

Vlădaia is a commune located in Mehedinți County, Oltenia, Romania. It is composed of four villages: Almăjel, Scorila, Ștircovița and Vlădaia.
