= Pătulele =

- Commune
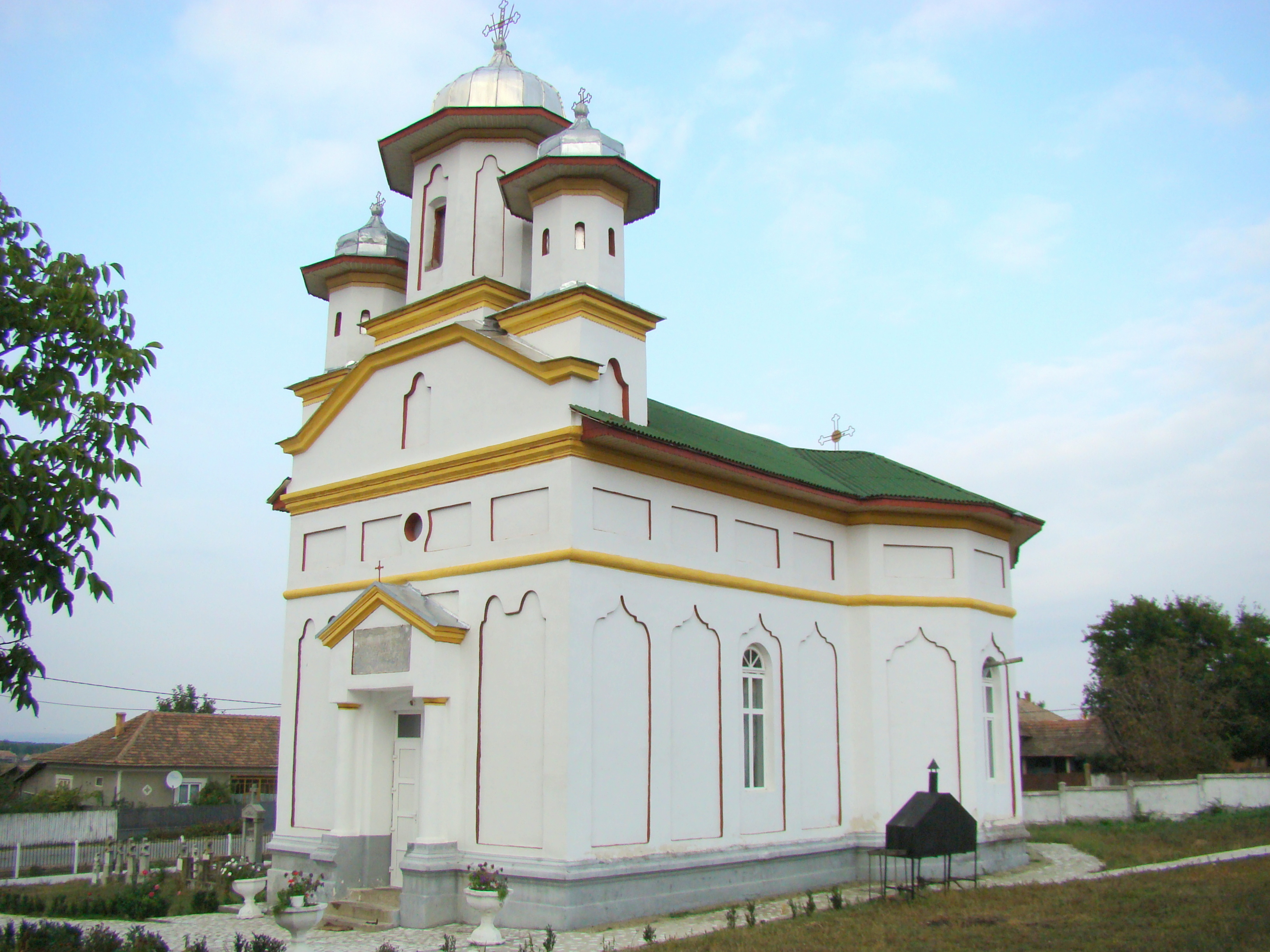
- St. Nicholas Church in Pătulele

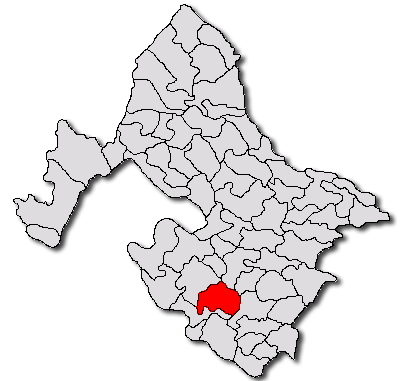
- Location in Mehedinți County

- Location in Romania
- Coordinates: 44°21′N 22°46′E
- Country: Romania
- County: Mehedinți

Government
  - Mayor (2024–2028): Ion Țicu (PNL)
- Area: 105.86 km^{2} (40.87 sq mi)
- Elevation: 75 m (246 ft)
- Population (2021-12-01): 3,038
  - Density: 28.70/km^{2} (74.33/sq mi)
- Time zone: UTC+02:00 (EET)
  - Summer (DST): UTC+03:00 (EEST)
- Postal code: 227350
- Area code: (+40) 0252
- Vehicle reg.: MH
- Website: www.primariapatulelemh.ro

Pătulele is a commune located in Mehedinți County, Oltenia, Romania. It is composed of two villages, Pătulele and Viașu.
