= Cujmir =

- Commune
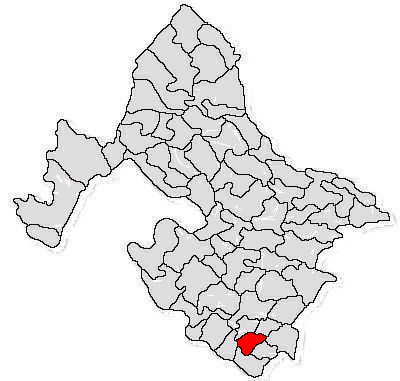
- Location in Mehedinți County

- Location in Romania
- Coordinates: 44°12′N 22°56′E
- Country: Romania
- County: Mehedinți
- Area: 44.1 km^{2} (17.0 sq mi)
- Population (2021-12-01): 2,754
  - Density: 62.4/km^{2} (162/sq mi)
- Time zone: UTC+02:00 (EET)
  - Summer (DST): UTC+03:00 (EEST)
- Vehicle reg.: MH

Cujmir is a commune in Mehedinți County, Oltenia, Romania, with 3,221 inhabitants as of 2011. It is composed of three villages: Aurora, Cujmir, and Cujmiru Mic.

== Natives ==
- Iulică Ruican (born 1971), rower
