= Gogoșu, Mehedinți =

Gogoșu
- Commune
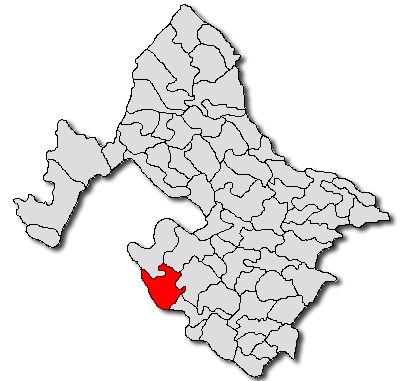
- Location in Mehedinți County

- Location in Romania
- Coordinates: 44°22′48″N 22°34′48″E
- Country: Romania
- County: Mehedinți
- Area: 76.19 km^{2} (29.42 sq mi)
- Population (2021-12-01): 3,910
  - Density: 51.3/km^{2} (133/sq mi)
- Time zone: UTC+02:00 (EET)
  - Summer (DST): UTC+03:00 (EEST)
- Vehicle reg.: MH

Gogoșu is a commune located in Mehedinți County, Oltenia, Romania. It is composed of four villages: Balta Verde, Burila Mică, Gogoșu and Ostrovu Mare.
