= Bâcleș =

- Commune
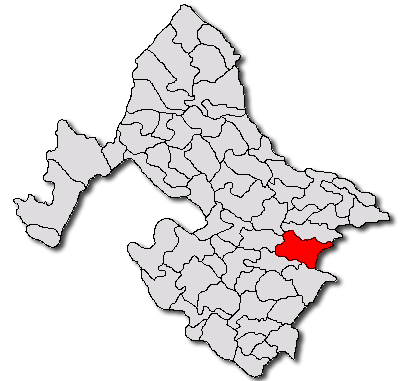
- Location in Mehedinți County

- Location in Romania
- Coordinates: 44°29′N 23°07′E
- Country: Romania
- County: Mehedinți
- Area: 96.46 km^{2} (37.24 sq mi)
- Population (2021-12-01): 1,586
  - Density: 16.44/km^{2} (42.58/sq mi)
- Time zone: UTC+02:00 (EET)
  - Summer (DST): UTC+03:00 (EEST)
- Vehicle reg.: MH

Bâcleș is a commune located in Mehedinți County, Romania. It is composed of seven villages: Bâcleș, Corzu, Giura, Petra, Podu Grosului, Seliștiuța and Smadovița. It is situated in the historical region of Oltenia.
