= Vânjuleț =

Vânjuleţ
- Commune
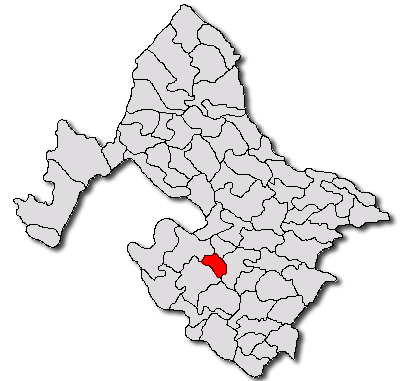
- Location in Mehedinți County

- Location in Romania
- Coordinates: 44°26′N 22°48′E
- Country: Romania
- County: Mehedinți
- Area: 37.33 km^{2} (14.41 sq mi)
- Population (2021-12-01): 2,022
  - Density: 54/km^{2} (140/sq mi)
- Time zone: EET/EEST (UTC+2/+3)
- Vehicle reg.: MH

Vânjuleţ is a commune located in Mehedinți County, Oltenia, Romania. It is composed of two villages, Hotărani and Vânjuleț.
