= Greci, Mehedinți =

Greci
- Commune
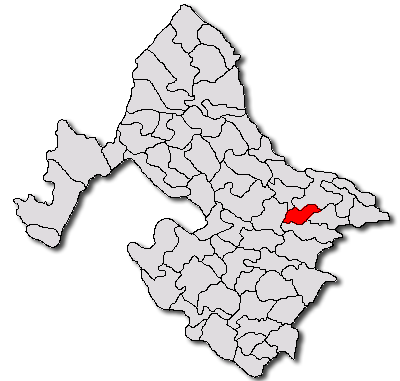
- Location in Mehedinți County

- Location in Romania
- Coordinates: 44°34′N 23°7′E
- Country: Romania
- County: Mehedinți
- Area: 30 km^{2} (12 sq mi)
- Population (2021-12-01): 1,067
  - Density: 36/km^{2} (92/sq mi)
- Time zone: UTC+02:00 (EET)
  - Summer (DST): UTC+03:00 (EEST)
- Vehicle reg.: MH

Greci is a commune located in Mehedinți County, Oltenia, Romania. It is composed of six villages: Bâltanele, Blidaru, Greci, Sălătruc, Valea Petrii and Vișina.

The commune is 2 kilometers away from the DN6 national road.
