= Corlățel =

- Commune
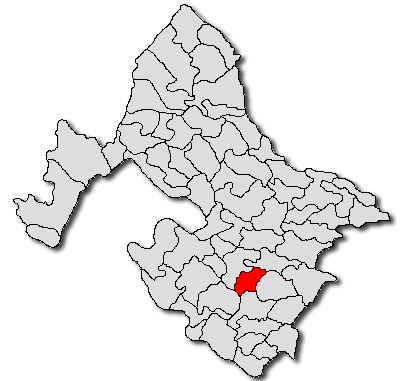
- Location in Mehedinți County

- Location in Romania
- Coordinates: 44°24′N 22°56′E
- Country: Romania
- County: Mehedinți
- Area: 46.54 km^{2} (17.97 sq mi)
- Population (2021-12-01): 1,162
  - Density: 24.97/km^{2} (64.67/sq mi)
- Time zone: UTC+02:00 (EET)
  - Summer (DST): UTC+03:00 (EEST)
- Vehicle reg.: MH

Corlățel is a commune located in Mehedinți County, Oltenia, Romania. It is composed of two villages, Corlățel and Valea Anilor.
