= Rogova =

- Commune
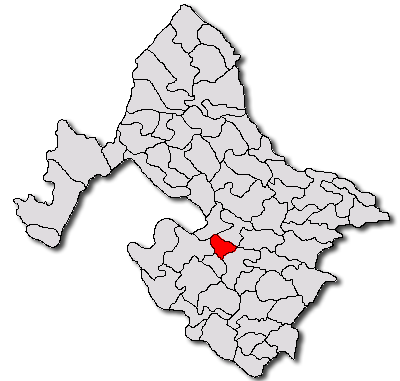
- Location in Mehedinți County

- Location in Romania
- Coordinates: 44°28′N 22°48′E
- Country: Romania
- County: Mehedinți
- Area: 37.68 km^{2} (14.55 sq mi)
- Population (2021-12-01): 1,248
  - Density: 33/km^{2} (86/sq mi)
- Time zone: EET/EEST (UTC+2/+3)
- Vehicle reg.: MH

Rogova is a commune located in Mehedinți County, Oltenia, Romania. It is composed of two villages, Poroinița and Rogova.
