= Punghina =

- Commune
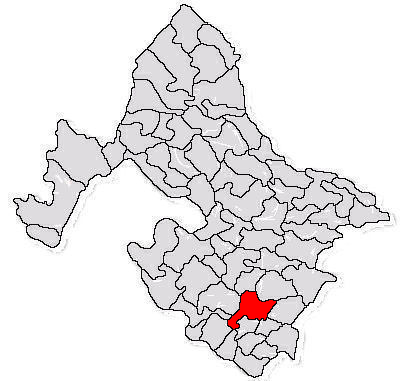
- Location in Mehedinți County

- Location in Romania
- Coordinates: 44°17′N 22°56′E
- Country: Romania
- County: Mehedinți
- Area: 72.85 km^{2} (28.13 sq mi)
- Population (2021-12-01): 2,381
  - Density: 32.68/km^{2} (84.65/sq mi)
- Time zone: UTC+02:00 (EET)
  - Summer (DST): UTC+03:00 (EEST)
- Vehicle reg.: MH

Punghina is a commune located in Mehedinți County, Oltenia, Romania. It is composed of five villages: Cearângu, Drincea, Măgurele, Punghina, Recea.
