= Mehedinți County =

County of Romania

Mehedinți County Județul Mehedinți
- County
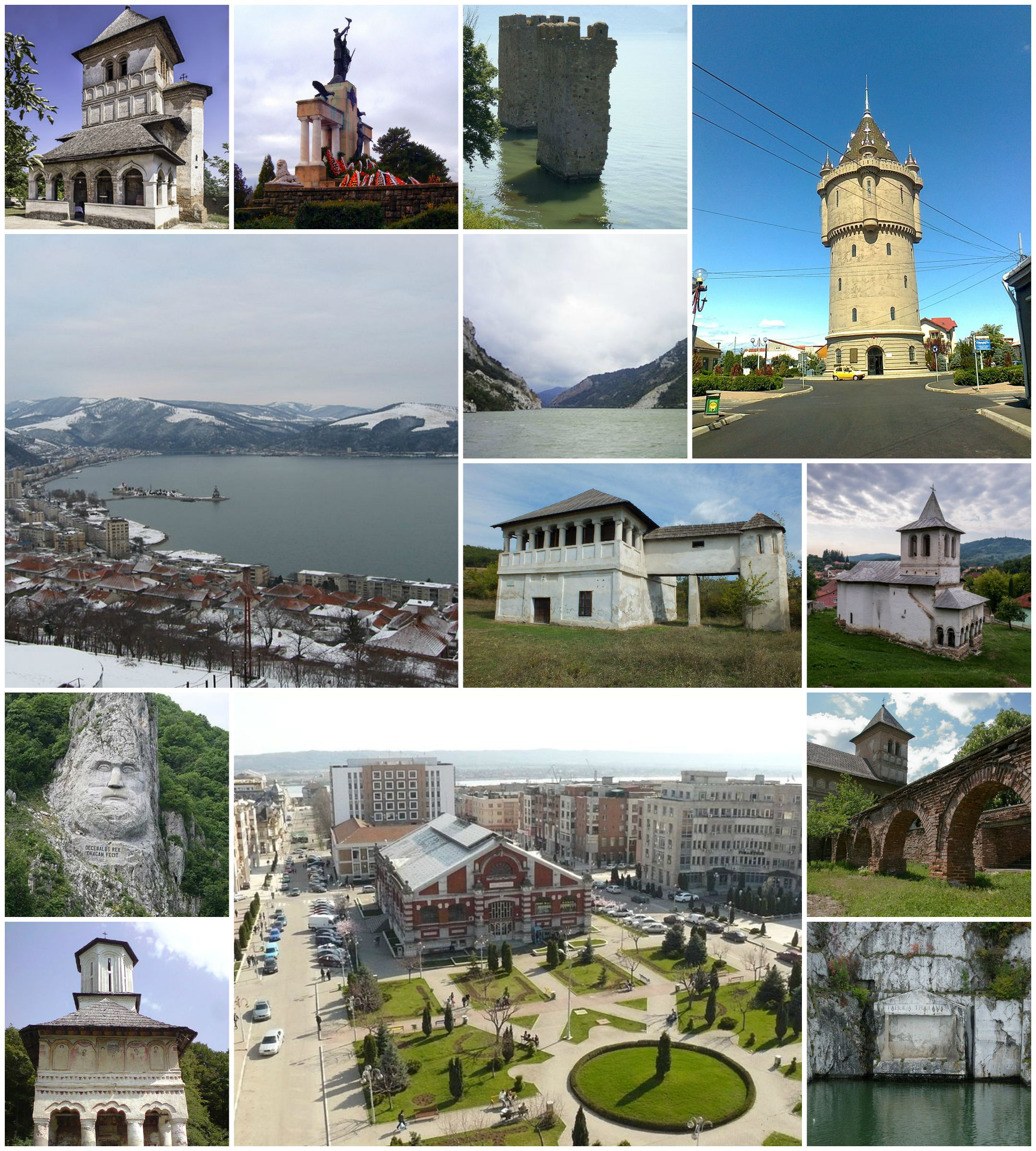

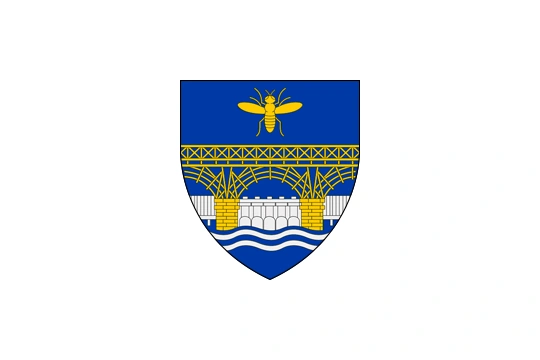
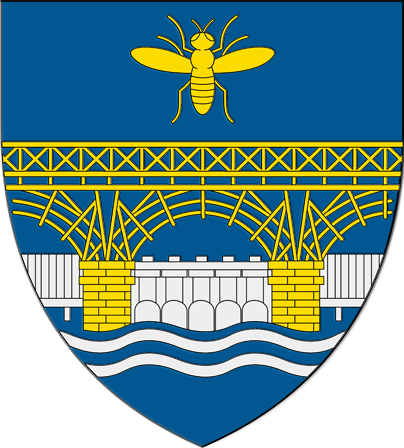
- Flag Coat of arms

- Coordinates: 44.63°N 22.88°E
- Country: Romania
- Development region: Sud-Vest
- Historical region: Oltenia, Banat
- Capital: Drobeta-Turnu Severin

Government
  - Type: County Council
  - President of the County Council: Aladin Gigi Georgescu (PSD)
  - Prefect: Constantin-Alin Isuf

Area
  - Total: 4,933 km^{2} (1,905 sq mi)
  - Rank: 30th

Population (2021-12-01)
  - Total: 234,339
  - Rank: 39th
  - Density: 47.50/km^{2} (123.0/sq mi)
- Telephone code: (+40) 252 or (+40) 352
- ISO 3166 code: RO-MH
- GDP (nominal): US$1.278 billion (2015)
- GDP per capita: US$5,024 (2015)
- Website: County Council; County Prefecture

Mehedinți County (Romanian pronunciation: [meheˈdint͡sʲ]) is a county (Romanian: județ) of Romania on the border with Serbia and Bulgaria. It is mostly located in the historical province of Oltenia, with one municipality (Orșova) and three communes (Dubova, Eșelnița, and Svinița) located in the Banat. The county seat is Drobeta-Turnu Severin.

== Name ==
The county's name is Méhed or Mehádia in Hungarian. The Romanian form originates from the first one, and a third originates from the Romanian: Mehedinc. The territory was famous for its apiaries, that is why it was named from the Hungarian méh word meaning bee. In Serbian the county's name is known as Жупанија Мехединци/Županija Mehedinci.

== Demographics ==
In 2021, it had a population of 234,339 and the population density was 47.504/km^{2} (123.036/sq mi).

- Romanians – 93.9%
- Roma – 5.4%
- Serbs – 0.3%
- Czechs – 0.1%
- Others – 0.3%

Year	County population
1948	304,788
1956	304,091 ▼
1966	310,021 ▲
1977	322,371 ▲
1992	332,091 ▲
2002	306,732 ▼
2011	254,570 ▼
2021	234,339 ▼

== Geography ==
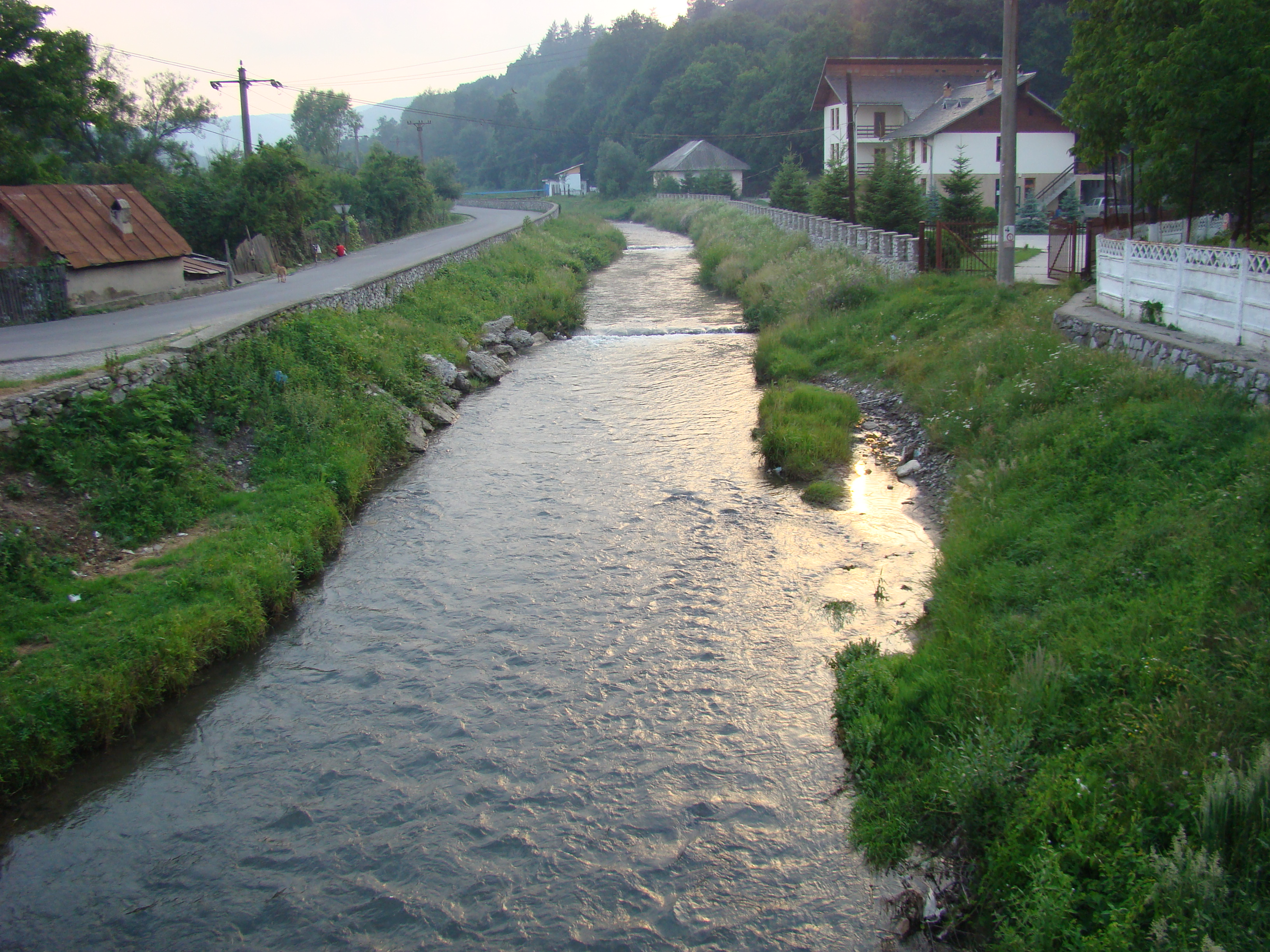
Bulba River at Baia de Aramă

This county has a total area of 4,933 km^{2} (1,905 sq mi).

In the North-West there are the Mehedinți Mountains with heights up to 1,500 m (4,900 ft), part of the Western end of the Southern Carpathians.

The heights decrease towards the East, passing through the hills to a high plain – the Western end of the Wallachian Plain.

In the South the Danube flows, forming a wide valley, with channels and ponds. Another important river is the Motru River in the East side, an affluent of the Jiu River. Also, in the West side there is the Cerna River forming a passage between the Oltenia region and the Banat region.

=== Neighbours ===
- Bulgaria in the South - Vidin Province.
- Serbia in the West and South-West - Bor District and Braničevo District.
- Caraș-Severin County in the North-West.
- Gorj County in the North-East.
- Dolj County in the South-East.

== Economy ==
The energetic sector is highly developed in the county, on the Danube being two big hydro electrical power plants (Iron Gates I and Iron Gates II). Also in NE of Drobeta-Turnu Severin there is a heavy water complex (Romag Prod).

The predominant industries in the county are:

- Chemical industry.
- Food and beverages industry.
- Textile industry.
- Mechanical components industry.
- Railway and ship equipment industry.
- Wood and paper industry.

In the North, coal and copper are extracted.

The South is mainly agricultural, suited for growing cereals on large surfaces. Also vegetables are cultivated and there are important surfaces of wines and fruit orchards.

== Tourism ==
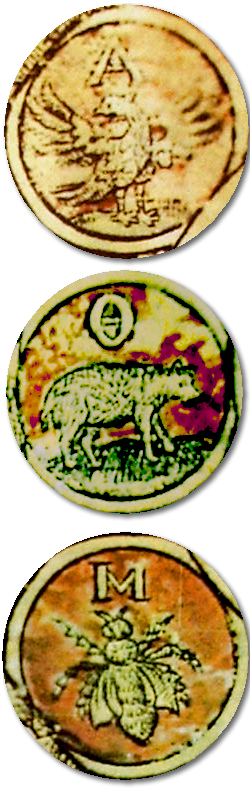
1715 coat of arms of Argeș, Teleorman and Mehedinți counties on the frontispice of the Antim Monastery

The main tourist destinations are:

- The city of Drobeta-Turnu Severin - the ruins of Trajan's first bridge over the Danube
- The city of Orșova.
- The Mehedinți Mountains.
- The Danube's Iron Gates.
- Baia de Aramă Monastery
- The Via Transilvanica long-distance hiking and biking trail, which crosses the county

== Politics ==
The Mehedinți County Council, renewed at the 2020 local elections, consists of 30 counsellors, with the following party composition:

Party	Seats	Current County Council
Social Democratic Party (PSD)	15	
National Liberal Party (PNL)	11	
PRO Romania (PRO)	2	
People's Movement Party (PMP)	2	

== Administrative divisions ==
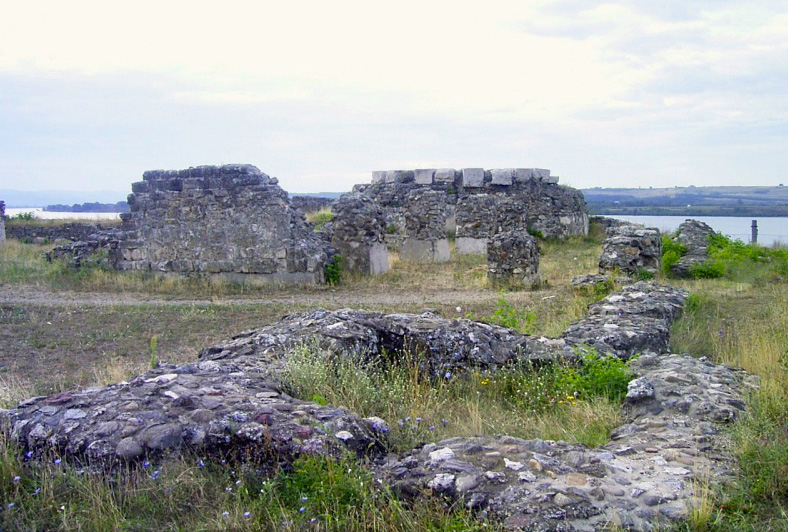
Ruins of Trajan's Bridge, Drobeta-Turnu Severin

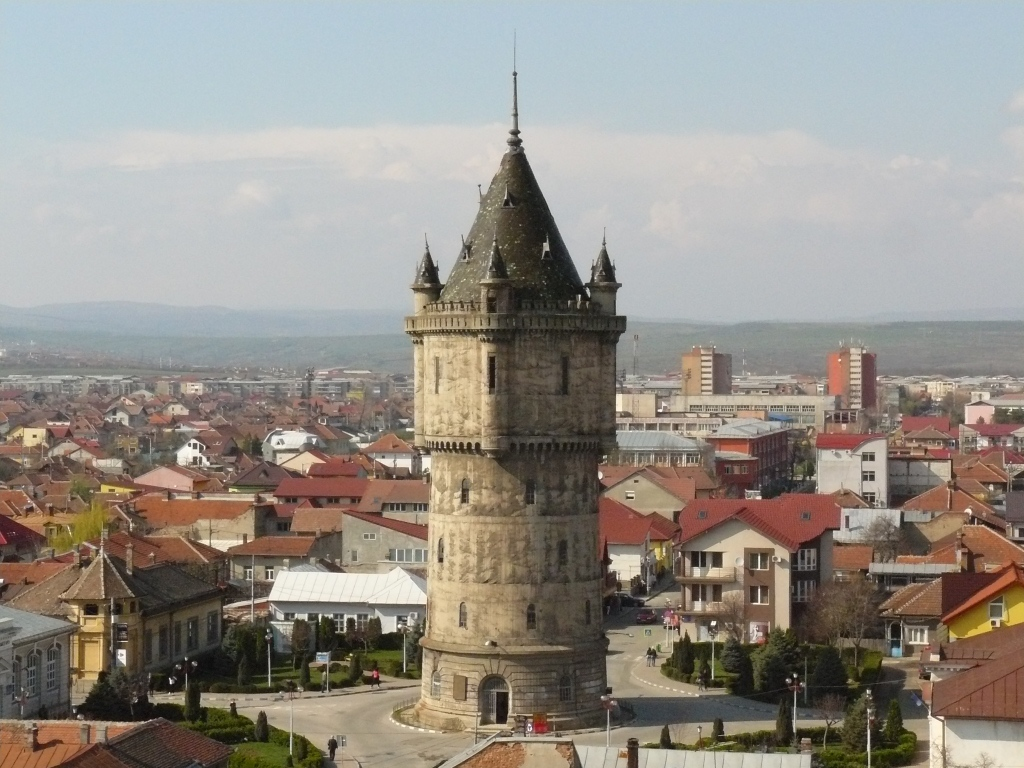
Drobeta-Turnu Severin

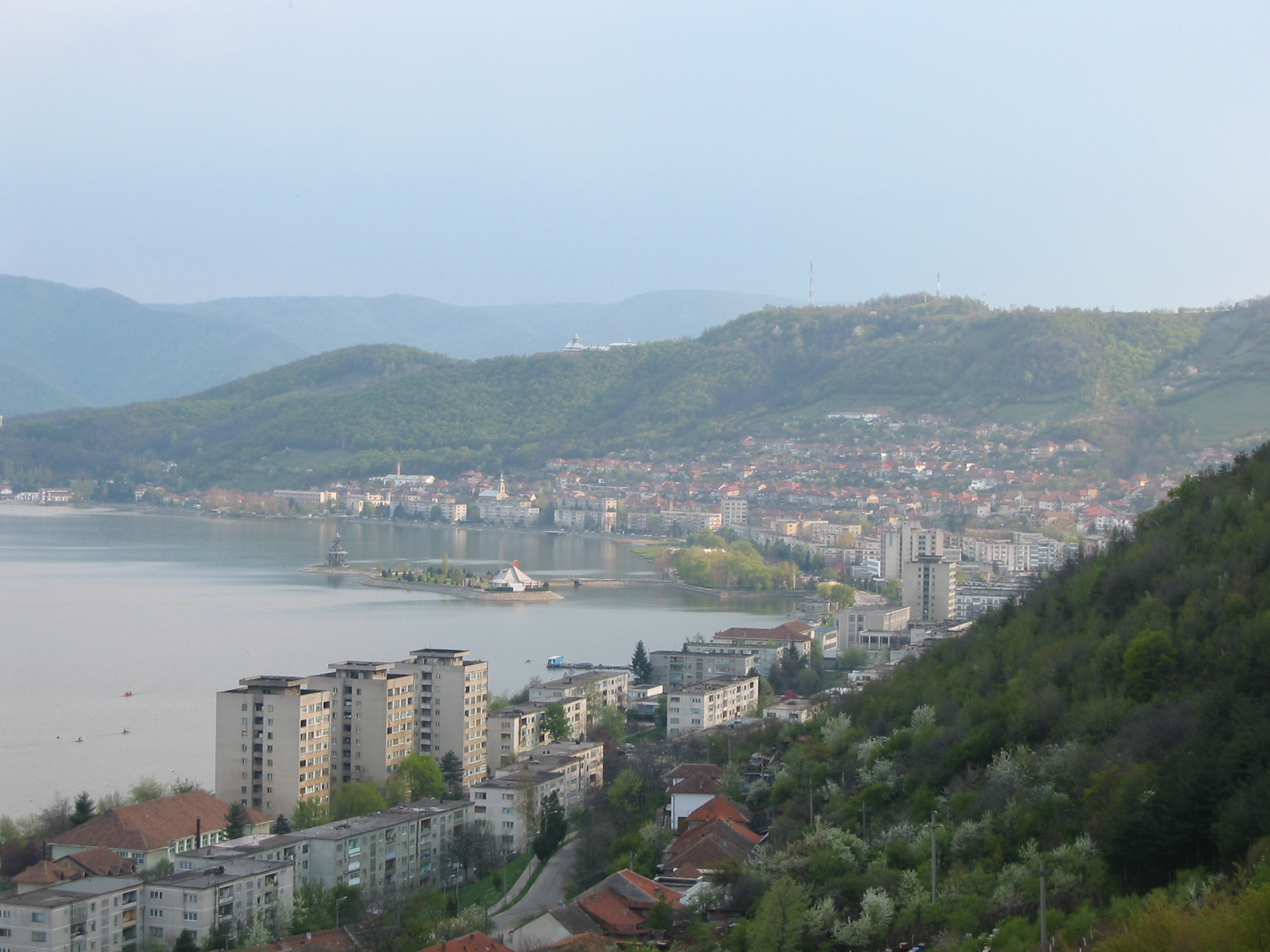
Orșova

Mehedinți County has 2 municipalities, 3 towns and 61 communes

- Municipalities
  - Drobeta-Turnu Severin - capital city; population: 79,865 (as of 2021)
  - Orșova
- Towns
  - Baia de Aramă
  - Strehaia
  - Vânju Mare
- Communes
  - Bâcleș
  - Bala
  - Bălăcița
  - Balta
  - Bâlvănești
  - Braniștea
  - Breznița-Motru
  - Breznița-Ocol
  - Broșteni
  - Burila Mare
  - Butoiești
  - Căzănești
  - Cireșu
  - Corcova
  - Corlățel
  - Cujmir
  - Dârvari
  - Devesel
  - Dubova
  - Dumbrava
  - Eșelnița
  - Florești
  - Gârla Mare
  - Godeanu
  - Gogoșu
  - Greci
  - Grozești
  - Gruia
  - Hinova
  - Husnicioara
  - Ilovăț
  - Ilovița
  - Isverna
  - Izvoru Bârzii
  - Jiana
  - Livezile
  - Malovăț
  - Obârșia de Câmp
  - Obârșia-Cloșani
  - Oprișor
  - Pădina Mare
  - Pătulele
  - Podeni
  - Ponoarele
  - Poroina Mare
  - Pristol
  - Prunișor
  - Punghina
  - Rogova
  - Salcia
  - Șișești
  - Șimian
  - Șovarna
  - Stângăceaua
  - Svinița
  - Tâmna
  - Vânători
  - Vânjuleț
  - Vlădaia
  - Voloiac
  - Vrata

== Historical county ==
Județul Mehedinți
- County (Județ)
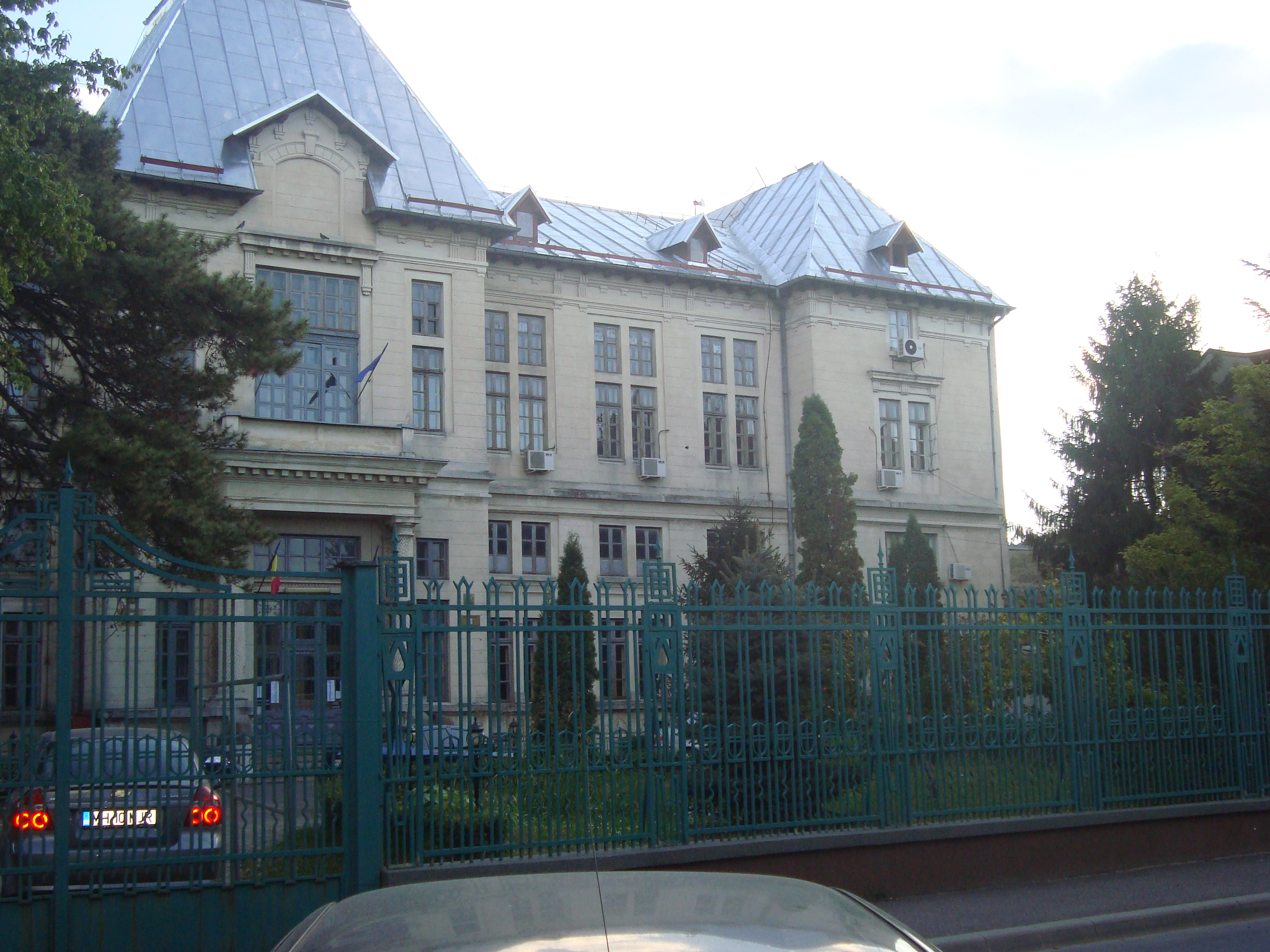
- The Mehedinți county court building of the interwar period.

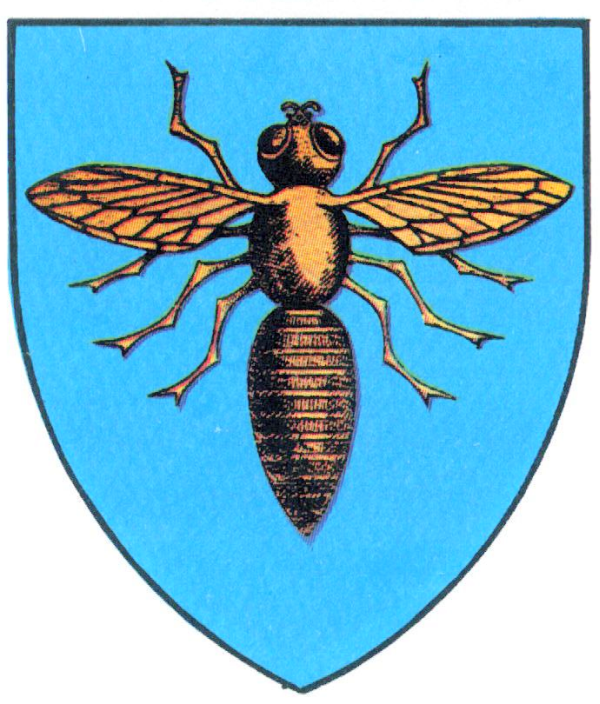
- Coat of arms

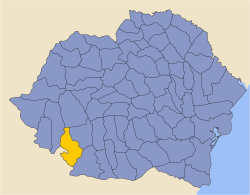
- Country: Romania
- Historic region: Oltenia
- Capital city (Reședință de județ): Turnu Severin

Area
  - Total: 5,320 km^{2} (2,050 sq mi)

Population (1930)
  - Total: 303,878
  - Density: 57.1/km^{2} (148/sq mi)
- Time zone: UTC+2 (EET)
  - Summer (DST): UTC+3 (EEST)

Historically, the county was located in the southwestern part of Greater Romania, in the western part of the historical region of Oltenia. Its capital was Târgu Jiu. The interwar county territory comprised a large part of the current Mehedinți County. At present, its territory comprises a large part of the current territory of Mehedinţi County except for the northern part belonging to Gorj County, while a small part of the former Severin County where Orșova was located is currently part of Mehedinți County.

It was bordered on the west by the Kingdom of Yugoslavia, in the northwest by Severin County, to the north by Hunedoara County, to the east by the counties of Gorj and Dolj, and in the south by the Kingdom of Bulgaria.

=== Administration ===
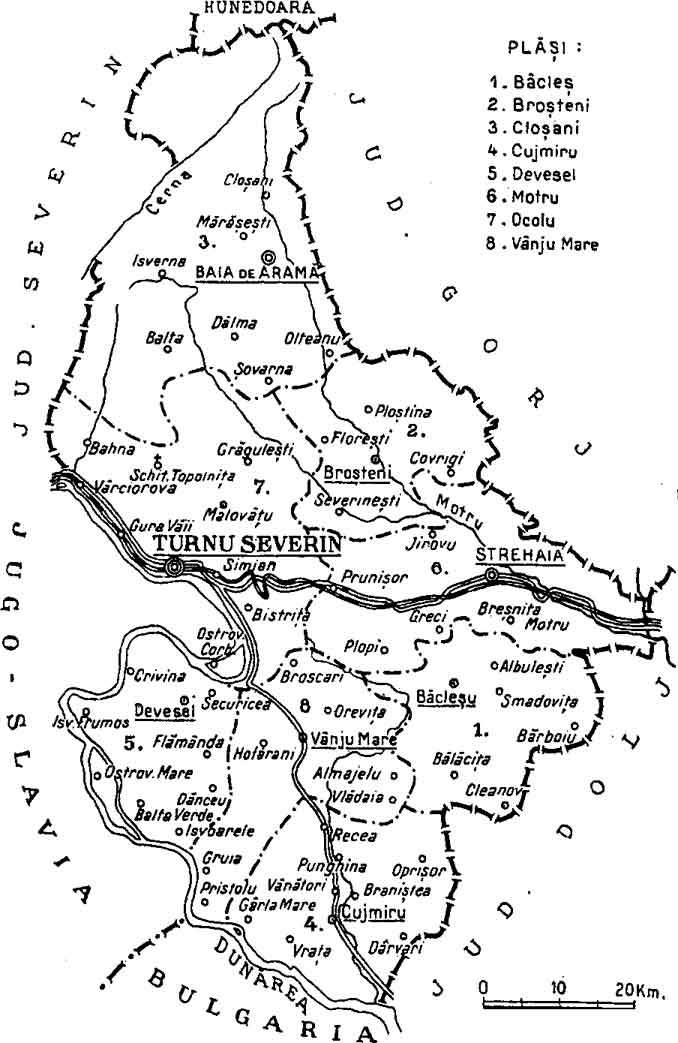
Map of Mehedinți County as constituted in 1938

The county was originally divided into four administrative districts (plăși):

1. Plasa Câmpul
2. Plasa Cloșani, headquartered at Cloșani
3. Plasa Motru, headquartered at Motru
4. Plasa Ocolul, headquartered at Turnu Severin

Subsequently, Plasa Câmpul was disbanded and replaced with five more districts:

1. Plasa Bâcleș, headquartered at Bâcleș
2. Plasa Broșteni, headquartered at Broșteni
3. Plasa Cujmir, headquartered at Cujmiru
4. Plasa Devesel, headquartered at Devesel
5. Plasa Vânju Mare, headquartered at Vânju Mare

=== Population ===
According to the 1930 census data, the county population was 303,878 inhabitants, ethnically divided as follows: 98.7% Romanians, 1.2% Romanis, as well as other minorities. From the religious point of view, the population was 99.0% Eastern Orthodox, 0.5% Roman Catholic, 0.2% Jewish, as well as other minorities.

==== Urban population ====
In 1930, the county's urban population comprised 91.3% Romanians, 2.5% Germans, 1.3% Romanies, 1.3% Jews, 1.1% Serbs and Croats, as well as other minorities. From the religious point of view, the urban population was composed of 92.9% Eastern Orthodox, 4.3% Roman Catholic, 1.5% Jewish, 0.4% Greek Catholic, 0.4% Lutheran, as well as other minorities.
