= Custura =

Custura may refer to several villages in Romania:

- Custura, a village in Racoviţa Commune, Brăila County
- Custura, a village in Cășeiu Commune, Cluj County

Custura is also the name of a peak in the Retezat Mountains
