= 2016–17 Cupa României preliminary rounds =

2016–17 Cupa României
Cupa României Timișoreana

Tournament details
- Country: Romania

The 2016–17 Cupa României preliminary rounds make up the qualifying competition to decide which teams take part in the main competition from first round. This is the 79th season of the most prestigious football cup competition of Romania.

The qualifying rounds took place between October 2015 and June 2016.

== First round ==
=== Argeș ===
These matches played on 7–10 October 2015

First-round results: Argeș

Tie no	Home team (tier)	Score	Away team (tier)
1.	AS Şoimii Tigveni (5)	6–1	AS Ciofrângeni (5)
2.	AS Băiculeşti (5)	3–0	AS Progresul Retevoieşti (5)
3.	ACS FC Dănuţ Coman II (5)	3–0	AS Deportivo Mălureni (5)
4.	CS Petrom Piteşti (5)	4–1	AS Drăganu (5)
5.	AS Voinţa Budeasa (5)	4–2	AS Şcoala de Fotbal Gică Retevoescu (5)
6.	AS Muşăteşti (5)	1–2	AS Voinţa Valea Iaşului (5)
7.	CS Domneşti (5)	6–1	AS Sporting Stăneşti Corbi (5)
8.	CS Albota 2012 (5)	7–0	AS Flacăra Leordeni (5)
9.	CS Mioveni III (5)	0–3	AS Poiana Lacului (5)
10.	AS Rătești (5)	0–8	AS Oarja 2011 (5)
11.	AS Stejarii Beleţi-Negreşti (5)	2–5	AS Colibaşi (5)
12.	AS Unirea Călineşti (5)	0–3	CS Atletic Bradu II (5)
13.	AS Rapid Davideşti (5)	3–0	AS Stâlpeni Rădeşti 2007 (5)
14.	AS Miroşi (5)	5–0	AS Căldăraru (5)
15.	AS Progresul Recea (5)	5–0	AS Izvoru (5)
16.	AS Energia Stolnici (5)	2–1	AS Unirea Hârseşti (5)
17.	AS Speranța Cornăţel (5)	8–3	AS Speranța Costești (5)
18.	AS Unirea Tricolor Șerbănești (5)	2–2 (4–5 p)	AS Viitorul Lunca Corbului (5)
19.	AS Young Boys Slobozia (5)	3–0	AS Slobozia (5)
20.	AS Viitorul Ştefan cel Mare (5)	3–0	AS Steaua Negraşi (5)
21.	AS Gloria Berevoeşti II (5)	7–1	AS Inter Aninoasa (5)
22.	AS Flacăra Boteni (5)	0–0 (3–0 p)	AS Petrolul Hârtieşti (5)
23.	AS Bughea de Jos (5)	0–2	AS Lereşti (5)
24.	AS Schitu Goleşti (5)	3–2	AS Inter Coteşti (5)
25.	AS Vulturul Vultureşti (5)	3–0	AS Sporting Mihăeşti (5)
26.	AS Cimentul Valea Mare Pravăţ (5)	2–0	AS Cetăţeni (5)
27.	AS Godeni (5)	1–4	AS Partizanul Vlădeşti (5)

=== Alba ===
These matches played on 29 and 30 August 2015

First-round results: Alba

Tie no	Home team (tier)	Score	Away team (tier)
1.	AS Decebal Cricău (5)	2–1	AFC Micești (5)
2.	AS Voința Beldiu (5)	2–2 (2–3 p)	AS Viitorul Sântimbru II (5)
3.	CS Industria Galda II (5)	5–0	AS Voința Stremț (5)
4.	ASC Pianu 2013 II (5)	0–4	AS Limbenii Limba (5)
5.	AS Viitorul Vama Seacă (5)	2–2 (2–4 p)	AS Fortuna Lunca Mureșului (5)
6.	AS Inter Unirea (5)	3–4	CS Viitorul Unirea (5)
7.	AS Crăciunelul de Jos (5)	3–3 (4–6 p)	AS Dacia Mihalț (5)

Tie no	Home team (tier)	Score	Away team (tier)
8.	AS Tineretul Șona (5)	1–2	AS Nicolae Linca Cergău (5)
9.	CS Spicul Bucerdea (5)	4–3	AS Viitorul Biia (5)
10.	AS Avântul Sâncel (5)	3–2	AS Pănade (5)
11.	AS Progresul Fărău (5)	7–1	AS Războieni Cetate (5)
12.	AS Național Rădești (5)	6–2	AS Șoimii Ciumbrud (5)
13.	AFC Lopadea Nouă (5)	0–1	ACS Băgău (5)
14.	AS Sportul Livezile (5)	7–4	AS Mureșul Gâmbaș (5)
15.	AS Sportul Petrești (5)	1–2	AS Hidromecanica Șugag (5)
16.	AS Viitorul Răhău (5)	1–0	AS Independența Cut (5)
17.	CS Navobi Alba Iulia (5)	2–4	AS Del Dodo Alba Iulia (5)

=== Arad ===
First-round results: Arad

Tie no	Home team (tier)	Score	Away team (tier)
1.	CS Atletico Arad (5)	3–2	Foresta Oil Sâmpetru German (5)
2.	CS Podgoria Ghioroc (5)	15–1	Olimpia Bârzava (5)
3.	Mureşul Zădăreni (5)	7–2	CS Voinţa Munar (5)
4.	AS Dorobanţi (5)	9–0	Speranţa Turnu (5)
5.	Semlecana Semlac (5)	6–0	Unirea Şeitin (5)
6.	AS Vinga (5)	2–0	AC Şagu (5)
7.	Înfrăţirea Iratoşu (5)	2–4	FC Zimandu Nou (5)
8.	Viitorul Șepreuș (5)	2–5	CS Recolta Apateu (5)
9.	Vulturii Socodor (5)	4–1	Steaua Grăniceri (5)
10.	Cetate Dezna (5)	1–3	CS Ineu II (5)
11.	Crișul Alb Buteni (5)	2–4	Unirea Gurahonț (5)
12.	Olimpia Bocsig (5)	5–2	AS Aluniș (5)
13.	Flacăra Țipar (5)	2–4	Viitorul Satu Nou (5)

=== Bihor ===
These matches played on 5 and 6 March 2016

First-round results: Bihor

Tie no	Home team (tier)	Score	Away team (tier)
1.	Voinţa Suplac (5)	4–2	Toldi Sânnicolau de Munte (5)
2.	CSC Paleu (5)	6–1	Frontiera Oradea (5)
3.	Stăruinţa Săcueni (5)	2–1	Cetatea Biharia (5)
4.	Unirea Bratca (5)	2–1	Minerul Şuncuiuş (5)
5.	AS Vadu Crişului (5)	3–1 (a.e.t.)	Inter Aştileu (5)
6.	AC Bihorul Lugaş (5)	1–3	Săgeata Brusturi (5)
7.	CSC Sînmartin (5)	2–6	LPS Bihorul Oradea (5)
8.	Voinţa Cheresig (5)	1–2	Unirea Livada (5)
9.	Voinţa Ciumeghiu (5)	3–1	Victoria Tulca (5)
10.	Unirea Roşia (5)	3–2	Liberty Pomezeu (5)
11.	AS Padişul Bihorul Gurani (5)	5–4	Zorile Bunteşti (5)
12.	AS Cefa (5)	3–0	Inter Crişul Batăr (5)

=== Bacău ===
These matches will be played on 27 April 2016

First-round results: Bacău

Tie no	Home team (tier)	Score	Away team (tier)
1.	AS Viitorul Urechești (5)	?–?	AS Viitorul Curița (4)
2.	AS Speranța Coțofănești (5)	?–?	AS Negri (4)
3.	AS Viitorul Ciucani (5)	?–?	AS Siretul Bacãu (4)
4.	AS Luceafărul Mărgineni (5)	?–?	CSM Moinești (4)
5.	AS Stejarul Buciumi (5)	?–?	AS Măgura Cașin (4)
6.	AS Mânăstirea Cașin (5)	?–?	AS Voința Oituz (4)
7.	AS Aripile Cleja (5)	4–2	AS Flamura Roșie Sascut (4)
8.	CS UZU Dãrmãneşti (5)	?–?	AS Măgura Târgu Ocna (4)

=== Bistrița-Năsăud ===
These matches played on 8, 15 and 22 November 2015

First-round results: Bistrița-Năsăud

Tie no	Home team (tier)	Score	Away team (tier)
1.	AS Minerul Rodna (5)	3–1	ACS Hebe Sângeorz-Băi (5)
2.	CS Someşul Rebrişoara (5)	4–2	A.S. Someșul Feldru 1954 (5)
3.	AS Olimpia Şieuţ (5)	5–6	ACS Voinţa Mărişelu (5)
4.	AS Real Buduş (5)	1–2	AFC Budac (5)
5.	AS Vulturul Arcalia (5)	3–0	ACS Heniu Prundu Bârgăului (5)
6.	AS Vulturul Braniștea (5)	2–2 (a.e.t.) (4–5 p)	AF Gloria Bistrița (5)
7.	AS Archiud (5)	2–1	ASFC Real Teaca (5)
8.	AS Unirea Bozieş (5)	2–6	AS Voința Matei (5)
9.	AS Recolta Chiuza (5)	2–5	AS Săgeata Dumbrăvița (5)
10.	AS Unirea Ciceu Giurgeşti (5)	1–3	AC Victoria Uriu (5)

=== Botoșani ===
First-round results: Botoșani

Tie no	Home team (tier)	Score	Away team (tier)
1.	ACS Unirea Curteşti (5)	3–2	AS Gloria Frumuşica (5)
2.	FC Avrămeni (5)	3–5	AS Unirea Săveni (5)
3.	Victoria Hlipiceni (5)	5–0	CS Mihălășeni (5)
4.	FC Ripiceni (5)	1–4	ACS Progresul Ștefănești (5)
5.	Venus Coțușca (5)	2–2 (5–4 p)	Spicul Iacobeni (5)
6.	Prutul Rădăuţi-Prut (5)	1–3	Azurii 92 Mileanca (5)
7.	Viitorul Dersca (5)	4–1	Internațional Cândești (5)
8.	Voinţa Şendriceni (5)	3–2	Flacăra Văculeşti (5)
9.	Arsenal Havarna (5)	2–6	ACS Inter II Dorohoi (5)

=== Brăila ===
First-round results: Brăila

Tie no	Home team (tier)	Score	Away team (tier)
1.	AS Voinţa Găiseanca (5)	5–2	AS Voinţa Făurei Sat (5)
2.	AS Spicul Râmnicelu (5)	3–0	AS Înfrăţirea Gemenele (5)
3.	AS Dinamo Salcia Tudor (5)	1–2	AS Olimpia Cazasu (5)
4.	ACS Romgal Romanu (5)	3–2	AS Siretul Vădeni (5)
5.	AS Stanriz Stăncuța (5)	4–0	AS Tractorul Viziru (5)
6.	AS Dacia Bertești (5)	2–5	FC Tufeşti (5)
7.	CS Dunărea Gropeni (5)	2–3	AS Dunărea Tichileşti (5)
8.	AS Speranţa Măxineni (5)	2–6	AS Șoimii Unirea (5)
9.	AS Tricolorul Lanurile (5)	5–1	AS Bordei Verde (5)
10.	AS Victoria Deduleşti (5)	1–3	AS Unirea Grădiştea (5)
11.	FC Urleasca (5)	6–0	CS Avântul Mircea Vodă (5)
12.	AS Voinţa Bărăganu (5)	3–2	AS Comagrim Dudeşti (5)
13.	AS Spicul Zăvoaia (5)	0–3	AS Viitorul Cireşu (5)
14.	CS Viitorul Ianca (5)	3–1	AS Vulturul Horia (5)
15.	AS Jirlău (5)	4–0	AS Viitorul Galbenu (5)

=== Bucharest ===
First-round results: Bucharest

Tie no	Home team (tier)	Score	Away team (tier)
1.	Regal Sport (5)	12–0	CS Victoria București (4)
2.	CS Dinamo București (academie)	3–4	Venus București (4)
3.	Benfica Noua Generație (5)	3–2	VK Soccer (4)
4.	Atletico București (academie)	2–3	AS Romprim București (4)
5.	AS Tricolor (5)	1–14	AS Electroaparataj (4)
6.	AS Power Team (5)	1–2	CS Unirea Tricolor București (4)
7.	CA Peña Sport (5)	0–2	CS Electrica (4)
8.	CS Cadet (5)	3–9	AFC Comprest GIM București (4)
9.	AS Olimpic (5)	2–0	ASF Frăţia București (4)
10.	ACS Tracțiunea (5)	4–3	AS Termo București (4)
11.	AS Frăţia București (5)	0–1	Victoria București (5)
12.	FC Progresul București (4)	4–6	Progresul Spartac 1944 (5)
