= Făurei (disambiguation) =

Făurei may refer to several places in Romania:

- Făurei, a town in Brăila County
- Făurei, Neamț, a commune in Neamț County
- Făurei, a village in Ulmu Commune, Călărași County
- Făurei, a village administered by Băneasa Commune, Constanța County
- Făurei, a village in Garoafa Commune, Vrancea County
- Făurei-Sat, a village in Surdila-Greci Commune, Brăila County
