= Nicolae Bălcescu (disambiguation) =

Nicolae Bălcescu may refer to several places in Romania, all named in honour of the 1848 revolutionary Nicolae Bălcescu:

- Nicolae Bălcescu, Bacău, a commune in Bacău County
- Nicolae Bălcescu, Călărași, a commune in Călărași County
- Nicolae Bălcescu, Constanța, a commune in Constanța County
- Nicolae Bălcescu, Vâlcea, a commune in Vâlcea County
- Nicolae Bălcescu, a village in Vărădia de Mureș Commune, Arad County
- Nicolae Bălcescu, a depopulated village in Scorțaru Nou Commune, Brăila County
- Nicolae Bălcescu, a village in Coțușca Commune, Botoșani County
- Nicolae Bălcescu, a village in Alexandru Odobescu Commune, Călărași County
- Nicolae Bălcescu, a village in Călmățuiu Commune, Teleorman County
- Nicolae Bălcescu, a village in Nalbant Commune, Tulcea County
- Nicolae Bălcescu, a district in the town of Flămânzi, Botoșani County
- Nicolae Bălcescu, a district in the town of Vânju Mare, Mehedinți County
