= Bordei Verde =

- Commune
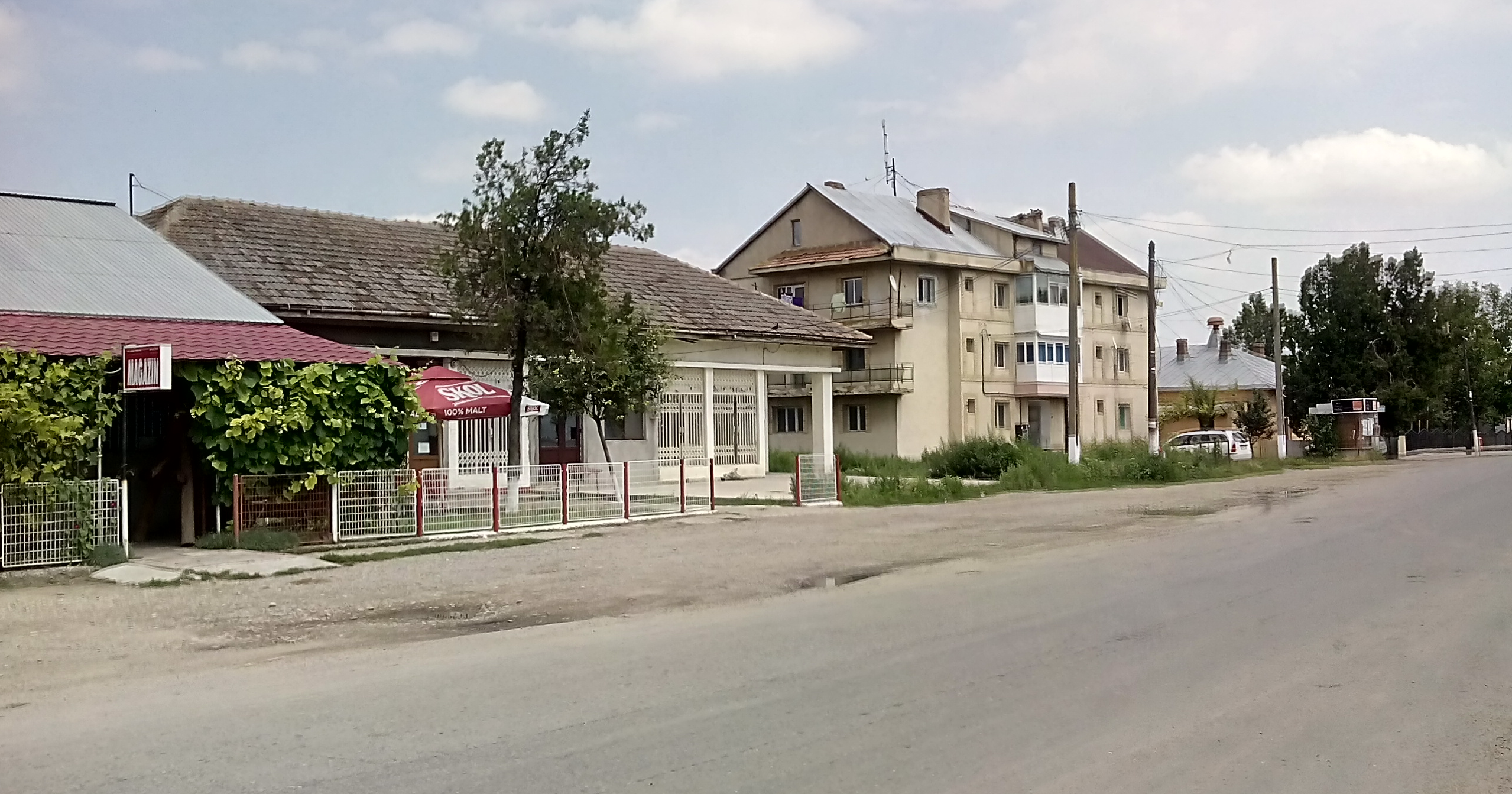
- View of Bordei Verde

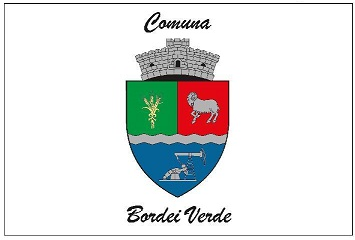
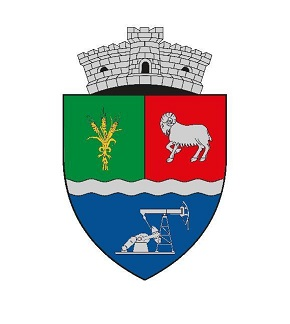
- Flag Coat of arms

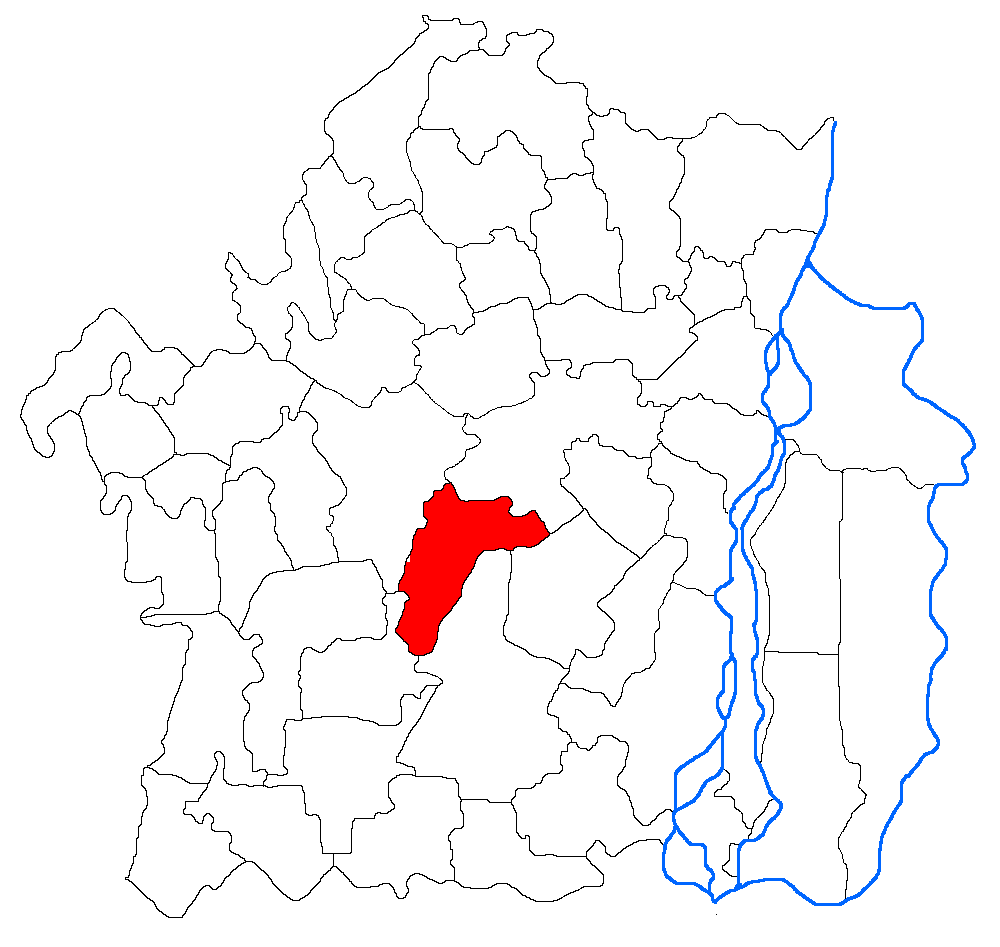
- Location in Brăila County

- Location in Romania
- Coordinates: 45°5′N 27°34′E
- Country: Romania
- County: Brăila

Government
  - Mayor (2020–2024): Dumitru Rotaru (PSD)
- Area: 86.52 km^{2} (33.41 sq mi)
- Highest elevation: 23 m (75 ft)
- Lowest elevation: 18 m (59 ft)
- Population (2021-12-01): 2,261
  - Density: 26.13/km^{2} (67.68/sq mi)
- Time zone: UTC+02:00 (EET)
  - Summer (DST): UTC+03:00 (EEST)
- Postal code: 817020
- Vehicle reg.: BR
- Website: primariabordeiverde.ro

Bordei Verde is a commune located in the central part of Brăila County, Muntenia, Romania. It is composed of three villages: Bordei Verde, Constantin Gabrielescu and Lișcoteanca. The nearest town is Ianca.

The commune is situated in the Bărăgan Plain, some 40 km (25 mi) west of the county seat, Brăila.

The village of Filiu, destroyed by the 1970 floods, has been abandoned.
