= Cuza Vodă =

Cuza Vodă may refer to several places in Romania, named after Prince (Vodă) Alexandru Ioan Cuza:

- Cuza Vodă, Călărași
- Cuza Vodă, Constanța
- Cuza Vodă, Galați
- Cuza Vodă, a village in Salcia Tudor Commune, Brăila County
- Cuza Vodă, a village in Stăncuța Commune, Brăila County
- Cuza Vodă, a village in Viişoara, Botoşani
- Cuza Vodă, a village in Sălcioara, Dâmbovița
- Cuza Vodă, a village in Ipatele Commune, Iaşi County
- Cuza Vodă, a village in Popricani Commune, Iaşi County
- Cuza Vodă, a village in Spineni Commune, Olt County
