= Viziru =

- Commune
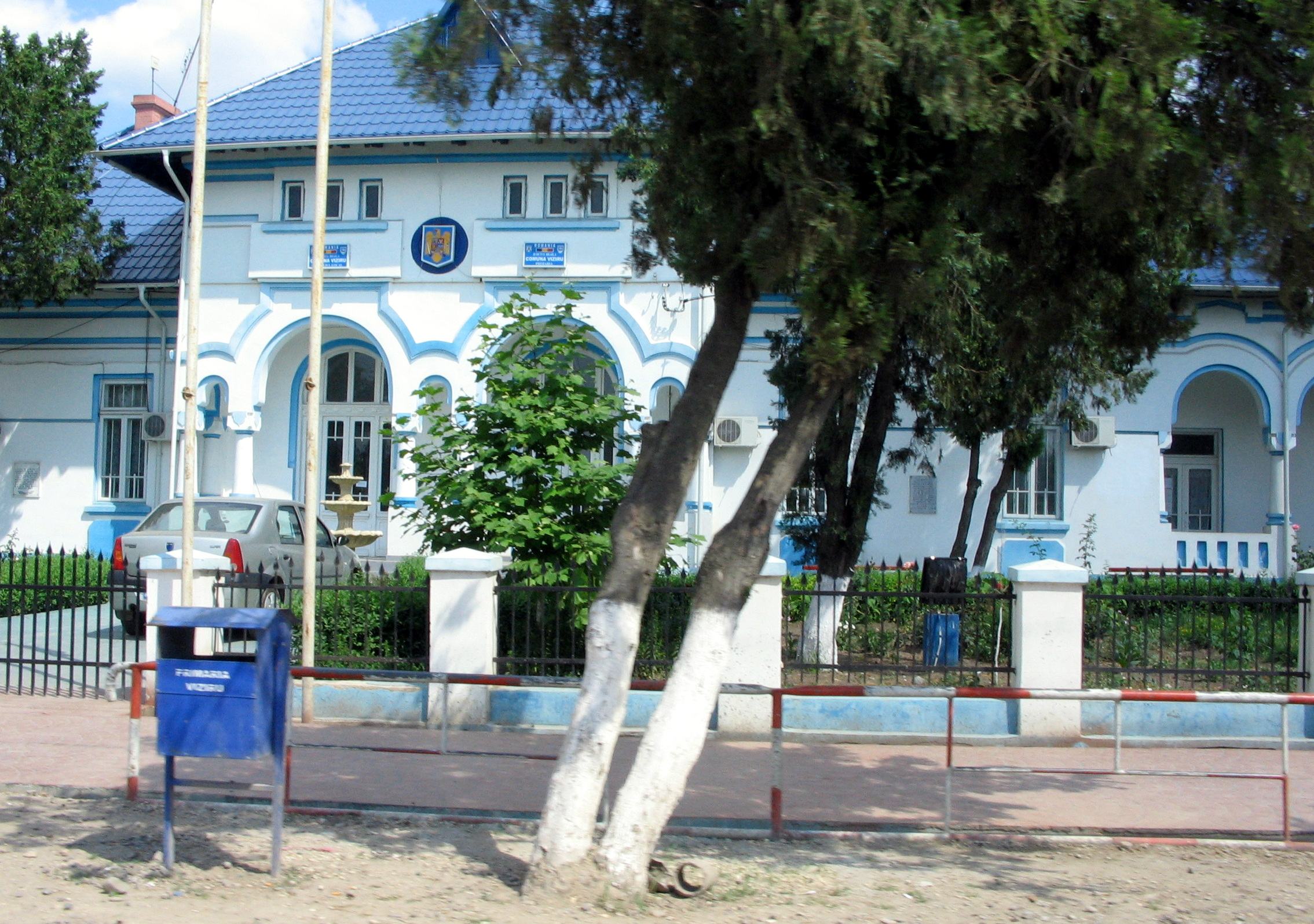
- Viziru town hall

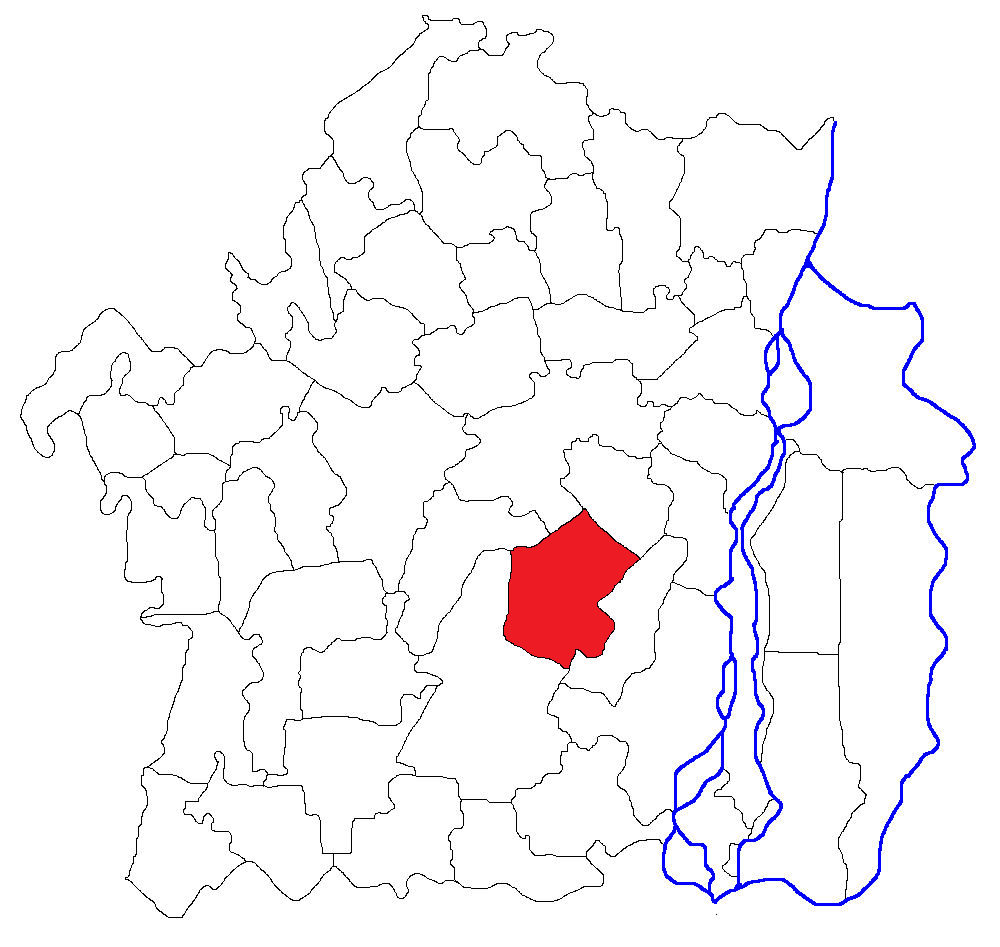
- Location in Brăila County

- Location in Romania
- Coordinates: 45°0′1″N 27°42′52″E
- Country: Romania
- County: Brăila

Government
  - Mayor (2021–2024): Ana-Cornelia Măcrineanu
- Area: 105.64 km^{2} (40.79 sq mi)
- Population (2021-12-01): 5,528
  - Density: 52.33/km^{2} (135.5/sq mi)
- Time zone: UTC+02:00 (EET)
  - Summer (DST): UTC+03:00 (EEST)
- Postal code: 817215
- Vehicle reg.: BR
- Website: www.primaria-viziru.ro

Viziru is a commune located in the central part of Brăila County, Muntenia, Romania. It is composed of two villages, Lanurile and Viziru.

The commune is traversed by the DN21 road, linking the county seat, Brăila, to Slobozia. It is crossed the 45th parallel north.

== Natives ==
- Costică Dafinoiu
- Gheorghe Dogărescu
