= Scorțaru =

Scorțaru may refer to one of two places in Brăila County, Romania:

- Scorțaru Nou, a commune
- Scorțaru Vechi, a village in Tudor Vladimirescu Commune
