= Oancea (disambiguation) =

Oancea is a Romanian name that may refer to:

== Places ==
- Oancea, a commune in Galați County, Romania
- Oancea, a village in the commune Romanu, Brăila County, Romania

== Rivers ==
- Oancea, a tributary of the Prut in Galați County, Romania

== Surname ==
- Evgheni Oancea, a Moldovan footballer
