= Victoria, Brăila =

Victoria
- Commune
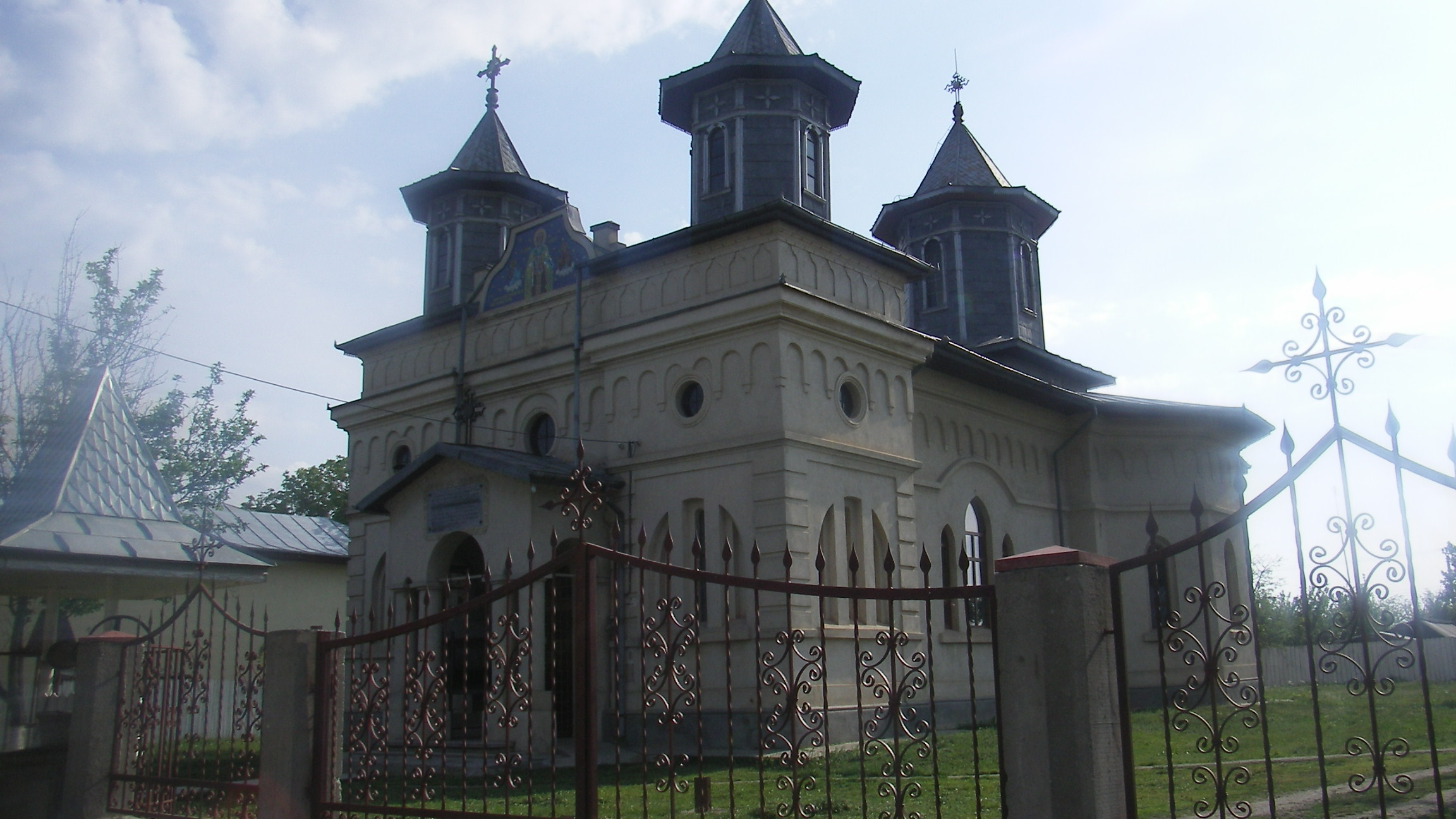
- Saint Nicholas Church, Victoria

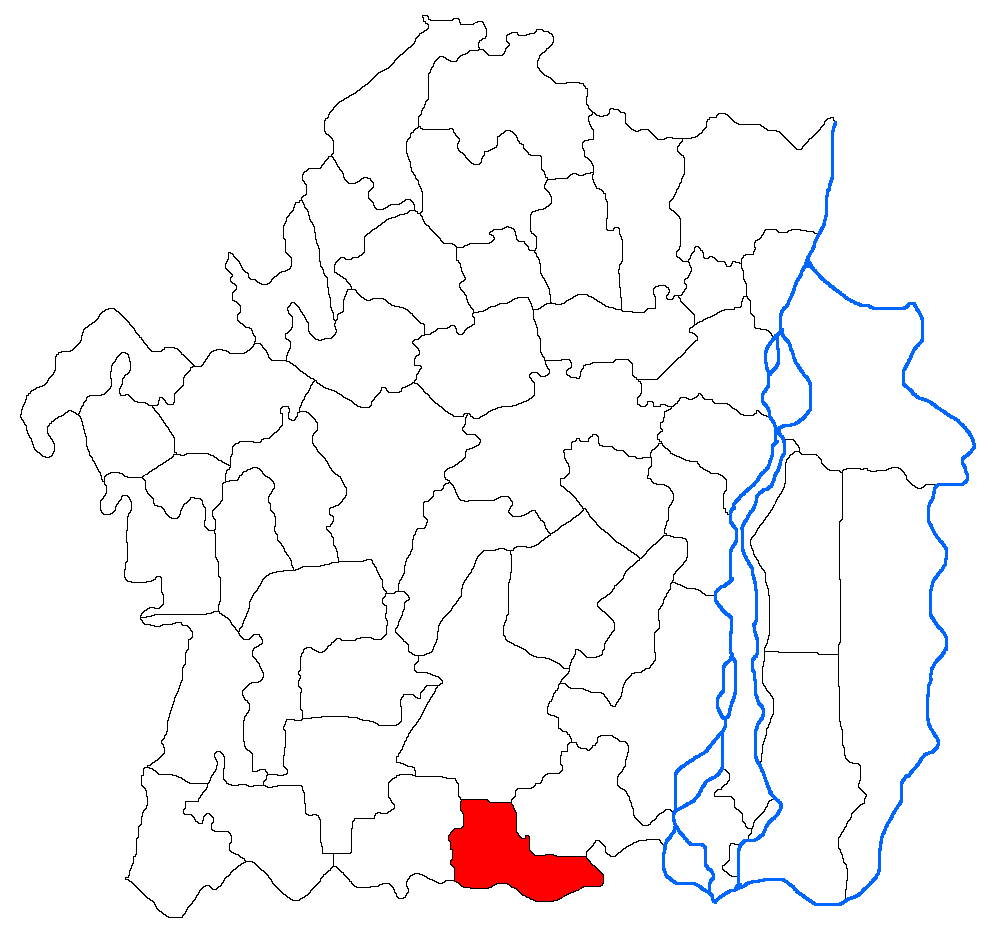
- Location in Brăila County

- Location in Romania
- Coordinates: 44°49′N 27°37′E
- Country: Romania
- County: Brăila

Government
  - Mayor (2020–2024): Costel Albu (PSD)
- Area: 72.59 km^{2} (28.03 sq mi)
- Population (2021-12-01): 3,323
  - Density: 45.78/km^{2} (118.6/sq mi)
- Time zone: UTC+02:00 (EET)
  - Summer (DST): UTC+03:00 (EEST)
- Postal code: 817205
- Vehicle reg.: BR
- Website: primariavictoria-br.ro

Victoria is a commune located in the southern part of Brăila County, Muntenia, Romania. It is composed of two villages, Mihai Bravu and Victoria.

The commune is situated in the middle of the Bărăgan Plain, on the border with Ialomița County. It lies 60 km (37 mi) south-southwest of the county seat, Brăila, and 20 km (12 mi) west of the Danube River.
