= Surdila-Găiseanca =

- Commune
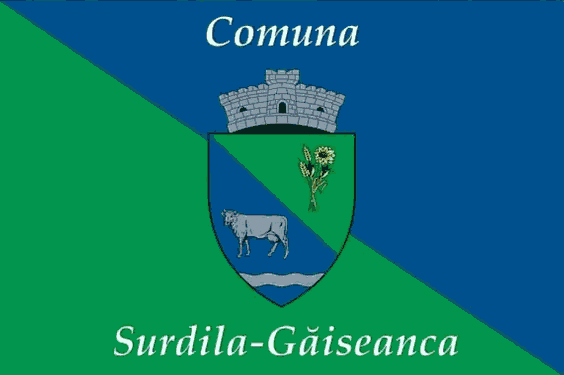
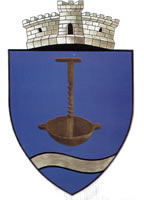
- Flag Coat of arms

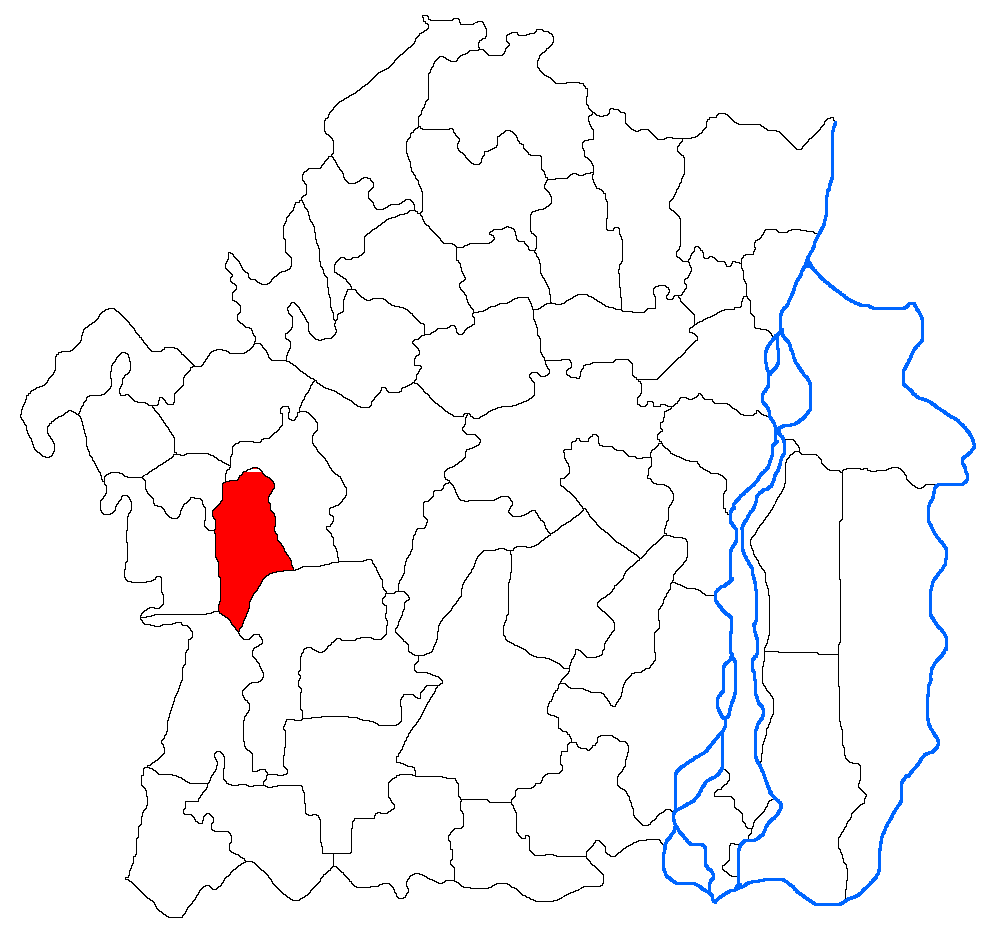
- Location in Brăila County

- Location in Romania
- Coordinates: 45°4′N 27°20′E
- Country: Romania
- County: Brăila

Government
  - Mayor (2020–2024): Gabriel Drăguț (PNL)
- Area: 60.34 km^{2} (23.30 sq mi)
- Elevation: 38 m (125 ft)
- Population (2021-12-01): 2,193
  - Density: 36/km^{2} (94/sq mi)
- Time zone: EET/EEST (UTC+2/+3)
- Postal code: 817155
- Area code: +(40) 239
- Vehicle reg.: BR
- Website: primariagaiseanca.ro

Surdila-Găiseanca is a commune located in Brăila County, Muntenia, Romania. It is composed of two villages, Filipești and Surdila-Găiseanca.

== Geography ==
The commune lies near the borders of Brăila and Buzău County, with only Făurei town in between. The Buzău River flows in a southwest-northeast direction to the north. The principal road passing through the commune is Highway 2B, which connects Buzău to Brăila, on the Danube to the east. A geographical feature of the commune is the Bărăgan Plain.
