= Ulmu =

Ulmu may refer to several places:

- Ulmu, Ialoveni, a commune in Ialoveni district, Moldova
- Ulmu, Brăila, a commune in Brăila County, Romania
- Ulmu, Călărași, a commune in Călărași County, Romania
- Ulmu, Transnistria, a commune in Transnistria, Moldova
