= Ulmu, Brăila =

Ulmu
- Commune
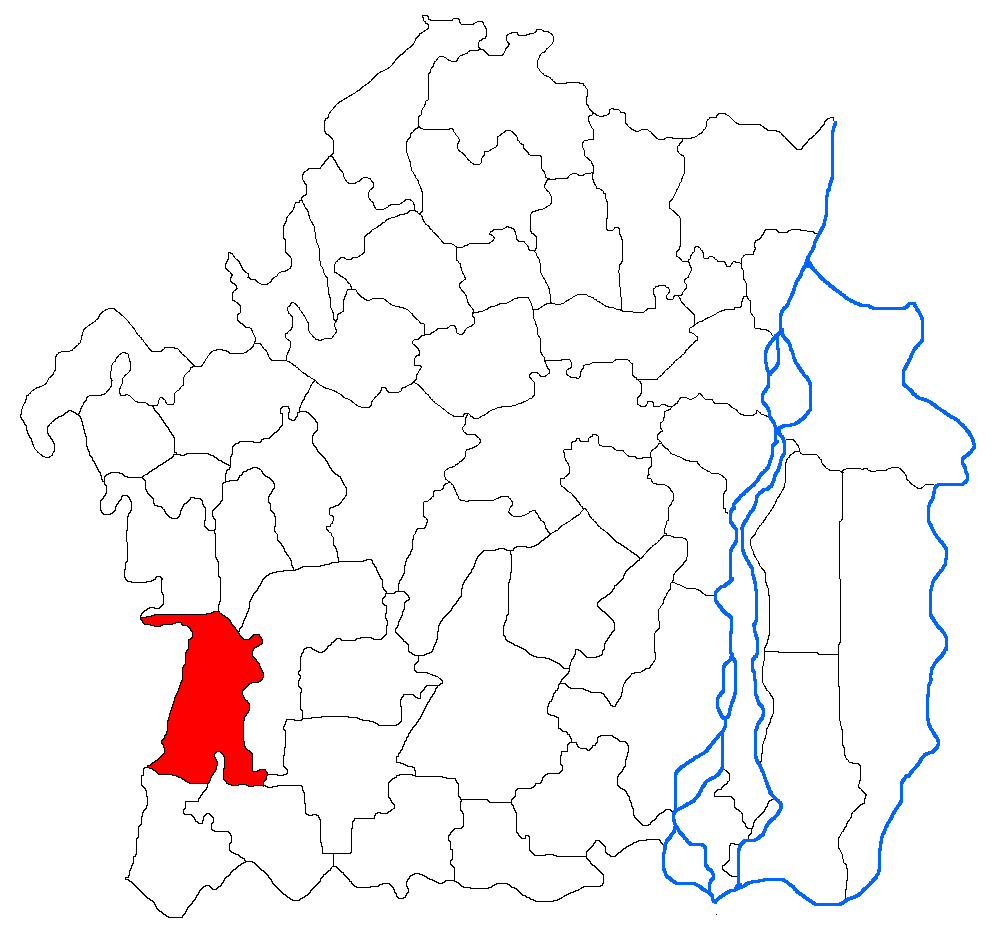
- Location in Brăila County

- Location in Romania
- Coordinates: 44°57′30″N 27°18′39″E
- Country: Romania
- County: Brăila

Government
  - Mayor (2020–2024): Vasile Bănică (PNL)
- Area: 101.61 km^{2} (39.23 sq mi)
- Elevation: 43 m (141 ft)
- Population (2021-12-01): 3,151
  - Density: 31/km^{2} (80/sq mi)
- Time zone: EET/EEST (UTC+2/+3)
- Postal code: 817190
- Area code: +(40) 239
- Vehicle reg.: BR
- Website: www.primariaulmu.ro

Ulmu is a commune located in Brăila County, Muntenia, Romania. It is composed of two villages, Jugureanu and Ulmu.

The commune is situated in the Bărăgan Plain, at an altitude of 43 m (141 ft). It is located in the southwestern part of the county, 18 km (11 mi) south of Făurei and 73 km (45 mi) southwest of the county seat, Brăila.
