= Movila Miresii =

- Commune
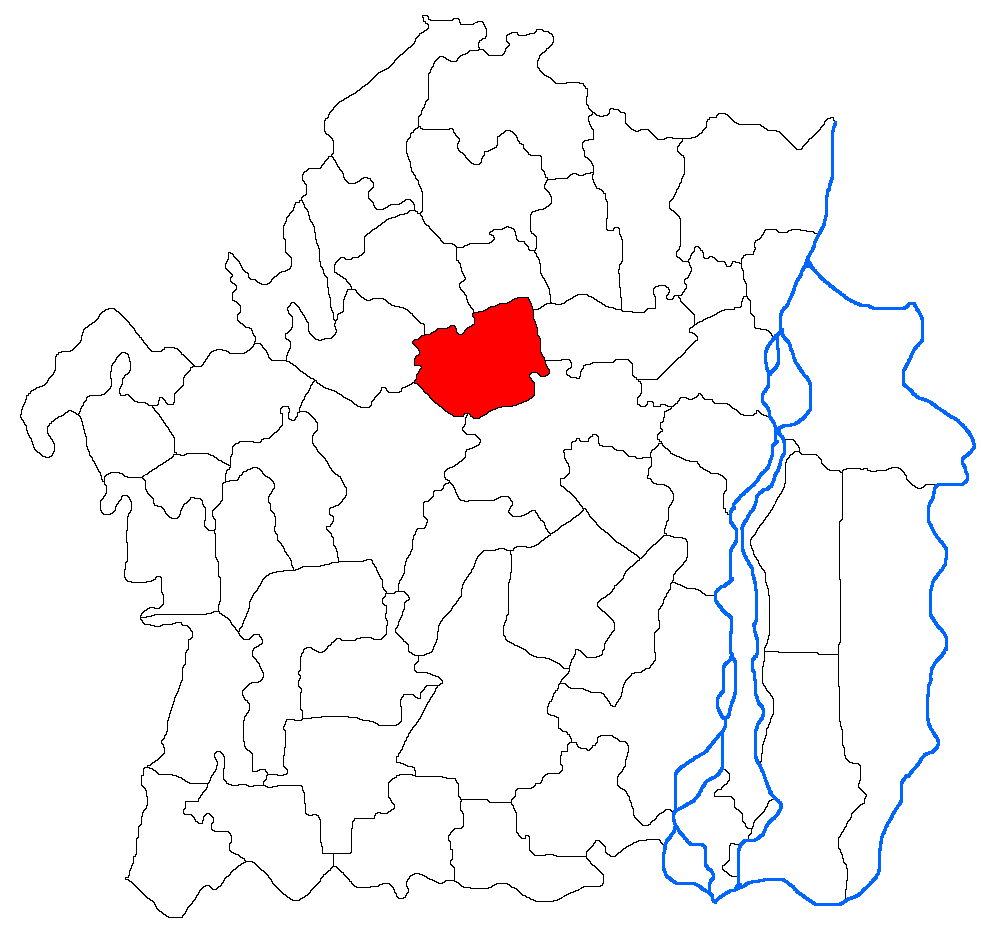
- Location in Brăila County

- Location in Romania
- Coordinates: 45°14′N 27°30′E
- Country: Romania
- County: Brăila
- Population (2021-12-01): 3,692
- Time zone: EET/EEST (UTC+2/+3)
- Vehicle reg.: BR

Movila Miresii is a commune located in Brăila County, Muntenia, Romania. It is composed of three villages: Esna, Movila Miresii and Țepeș Vodă.
