= Surdila-Greci =

- Commune
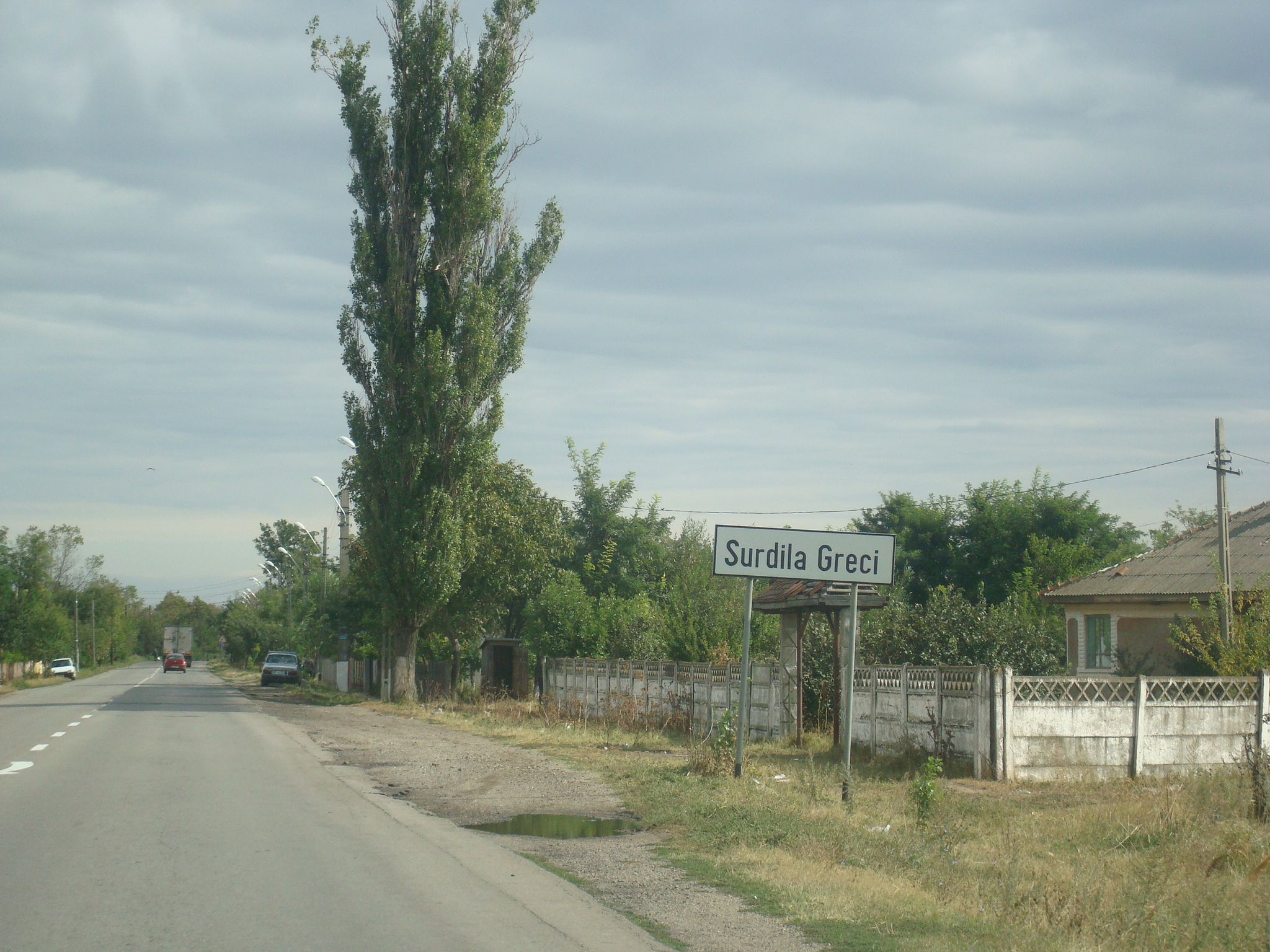

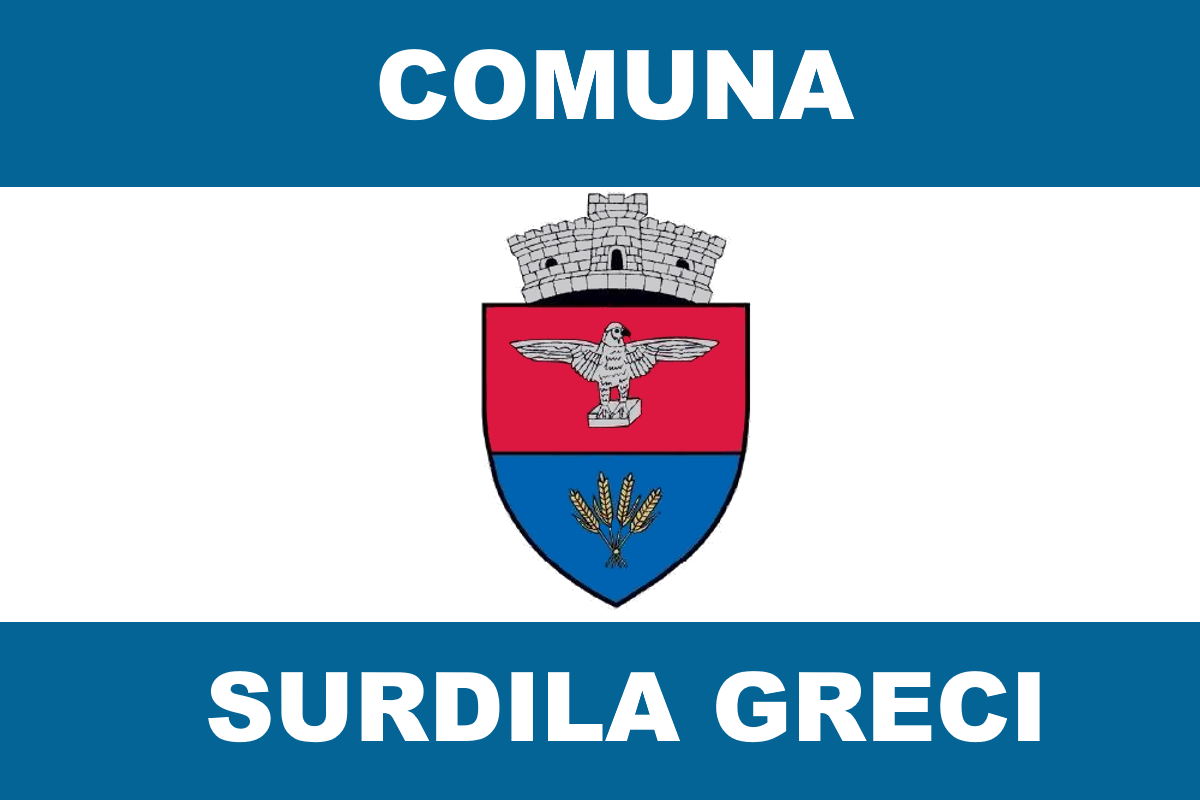
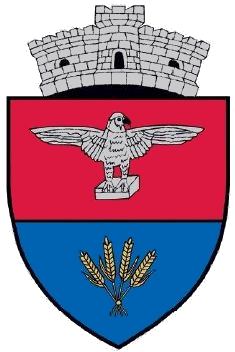
- Flag Coat of arms

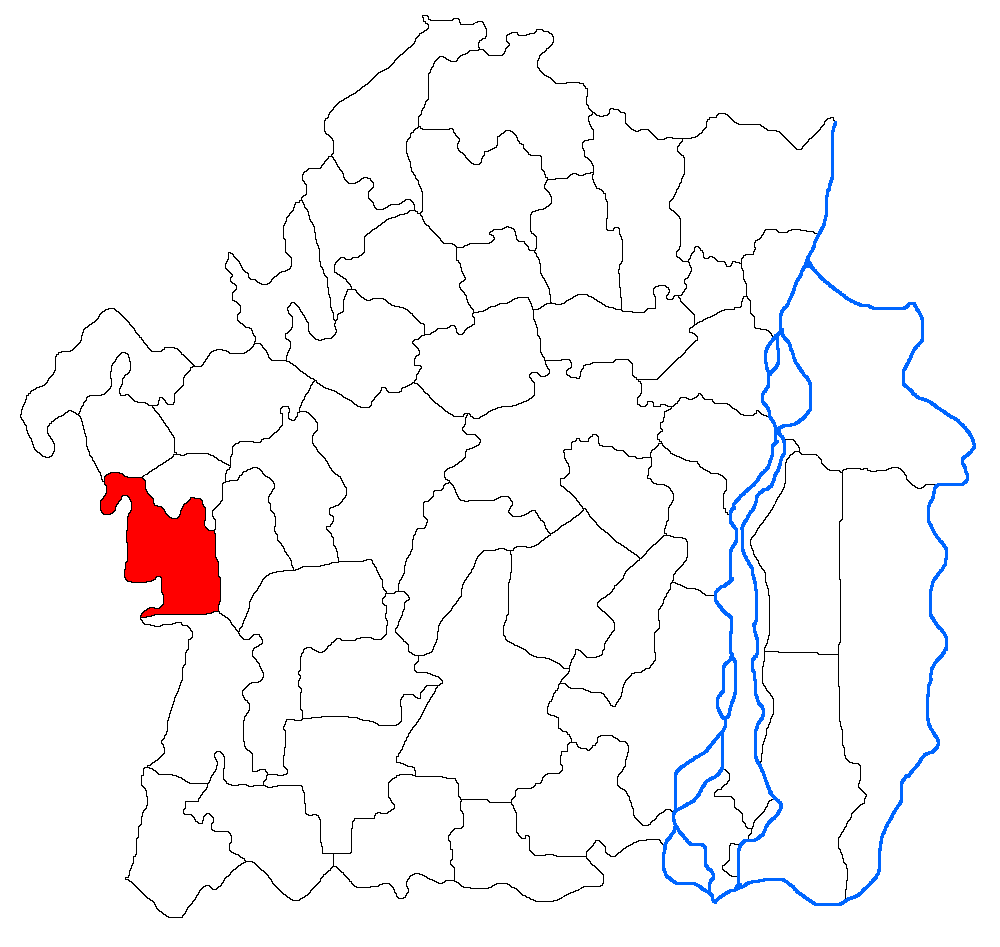
- Location in Brăila County

- Location in Romania
- Coordinates: 45°4′N 27°16′E
- Country: Romania
- County: Brăila

Government
  - Mayor (2020–2024): Ionel Meiroșu (PNL)
- Area: 89.55 km^{2} (34.58 sq mi)
- Elevation: 41 m (135 ft)
- Population (2021-12-01): 1,469
  - Density: 16.40/km^{2} (42.49/sq mi)
- Time zone: UTC+02:00 (EET)
  - Summer (DST): UTC+03:00 (EEST)
- Postal code: 817160
- Area code: +(40) 239
- Vehicle reg.: BR
- Website: www.comunasurdilagreci.ro

Surdila-Greci is a commune located in Brăila County, Muntenia, Romania. It is composed of four villages: Brateșu Vechi, Făurei-Sat, Horia, and Surdila-Greci.

The commune is located in the western part of the county, on the border with Buzău County, just west of Făurei. It is crossed by the national road DN2B, which connects the county seat, Brăila, with Buzău. The Surdila train station serves the CFR Main Line 700, which connects Bucharest with Brăila and Galați.
