= Unirea, Brăila =

Unirea
- Commune
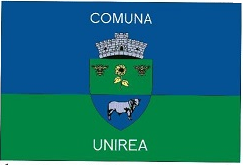
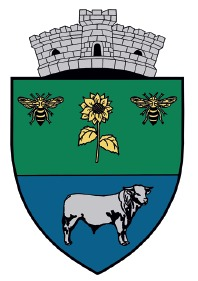
- Flag Coat of arms

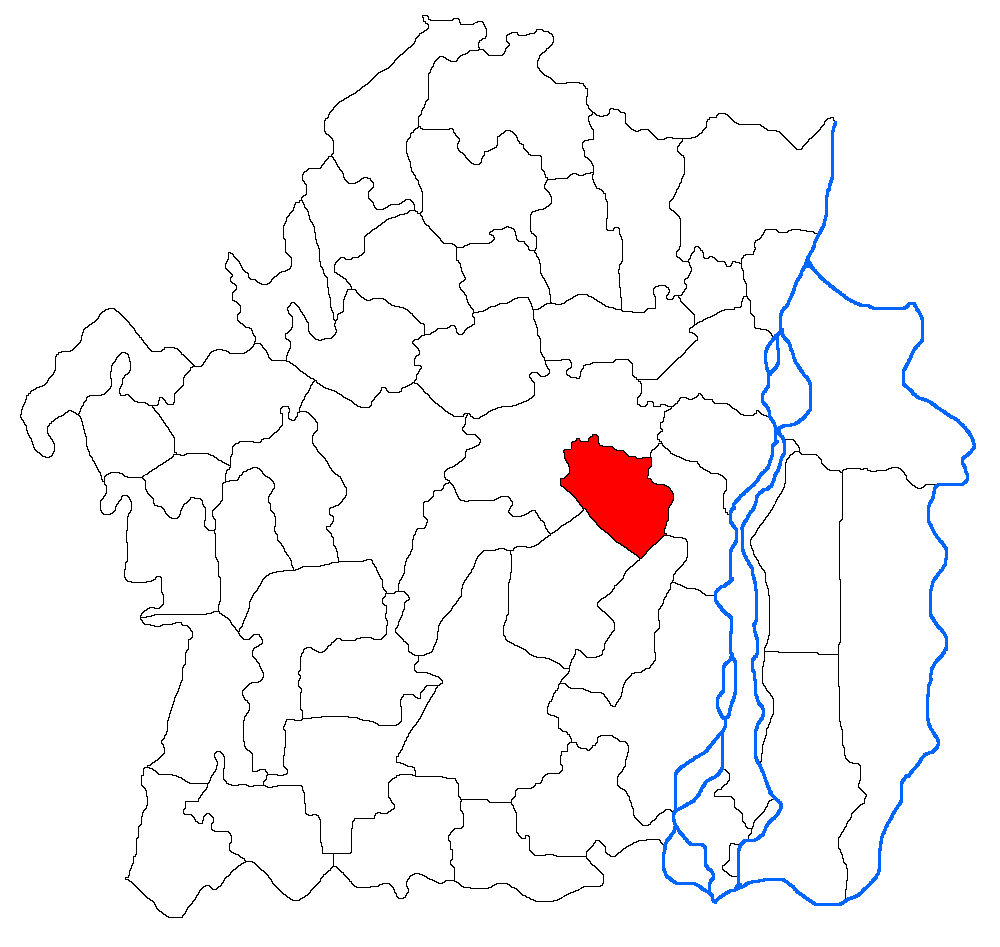
- Location in Brăila County

- Location in Romania
- Coordinates: 45°06′N 27°46′E
- Country: Romania
- County: Brăila
- Population (2021-12-01): 2,235
- Time zone: UTC+02:00 (EET)
  - Summer (DST): UTC+03:00 (EEST)
- Vehicle reg.: BR

Unirea is a commune located in Brăila County, Muntenia, Romania. It is composed of three villages: Morotești, Unirea and Valea Cânepii.
