= Zăvoaia =

- Commune
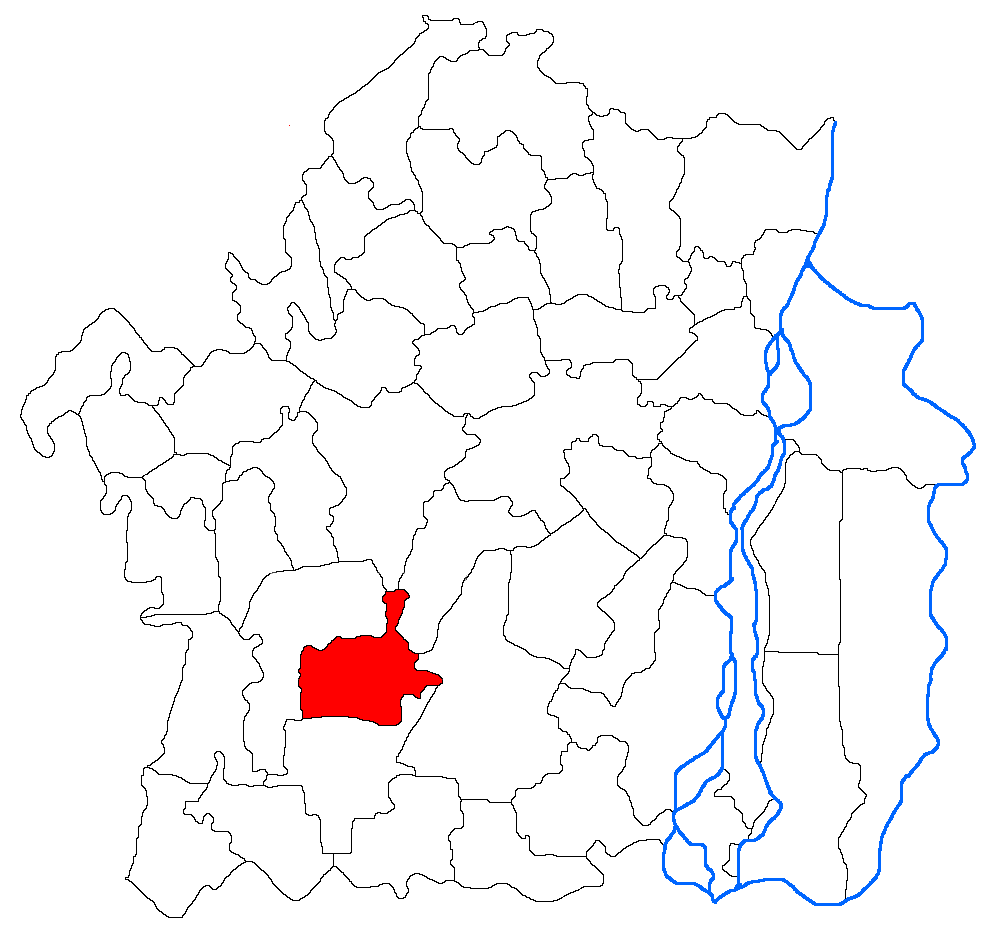
- Location in Brăila County

- Location in Romania
- Coordinates: 44°57′N 27°28′E
- Country: Romania
- County: Brăila
- Population (2021-12-01): 2,795
- Time zone: EET/EEST (UTC+2/+3)
- Vehicle reg.: BR

Zăvoaia is a commune located in Brăila County, Muntenia, Romania. It is composed of two villages, Dudescu and Zăvoaia.
