= Gheorghe Dogărescu =

Romanian handball player (1960–2020)

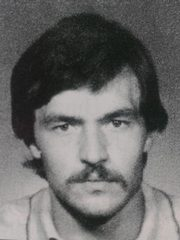

Personal information
- Born: 15 May 1960 Viziru, Romania
- Died: 18 August 2020 (aged 60)
- Height: 195 cm (6 ft 5 in)
- Weight: 94 kg (207 lb)

Sport
- Sport: Handball
- Club: CSS Galati (−1979); Dinamo București (1979–95); S.L. Benfica (1990−1991); Dinamo București (1991–95)
Medal record
Representing Romania
Olympic Games
| Bronze medal – third place | 1984 Los Angeles | Team |

Gheorghe Dogărescu (15 May 1960 − 18 August 2020) was a Romanian handball player who won a bronze medal at the 1984 Olympics. He spent most of his club career with Dinamo București, reaching with them the final of the 1981 EHF Cup Winners' Cup.
