= Frecăței, Brăila =

Frecăței
- Commune
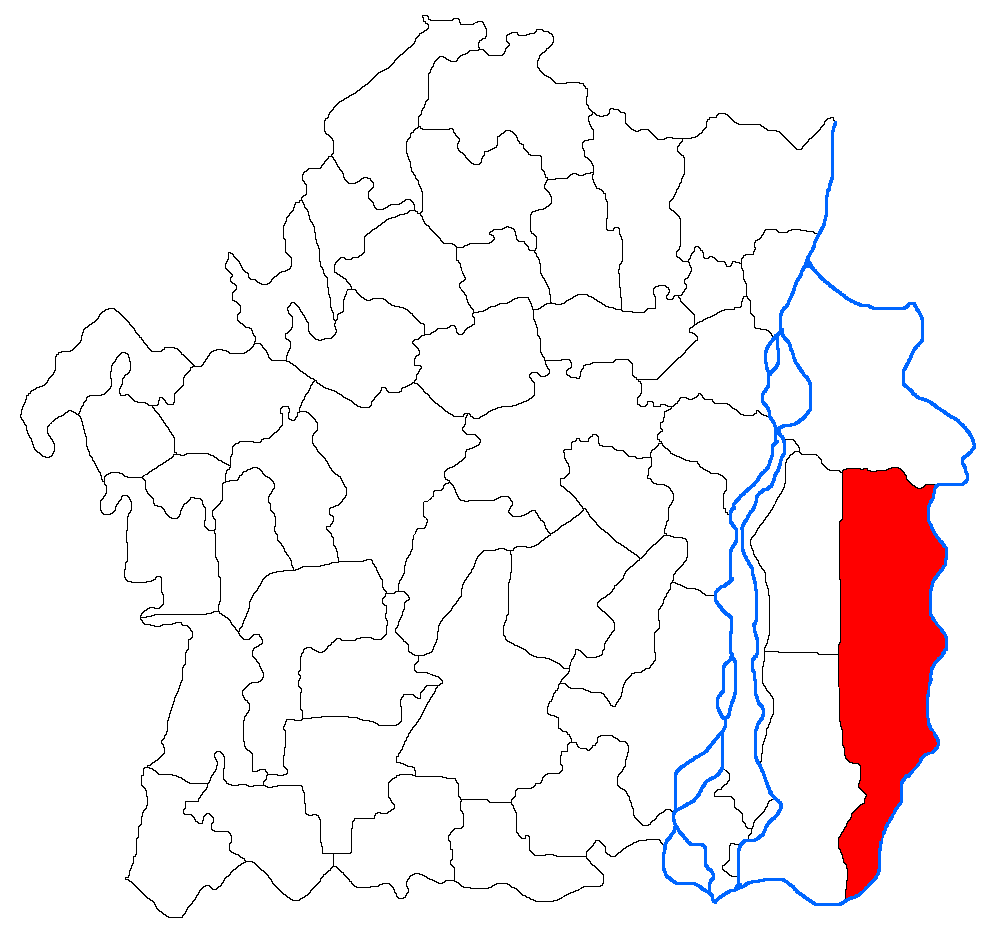
- Location in Brăila County

- Location in Romania
- Coordinates: 44°53′40″N 28°05′02″E
- Country: Romania
- County: Brăila
- Population (2021-12-01): 1,201
- Time zone: EET/EEST (UTC+2/+3)
- Vehicle reg.: BR

Frecăței is a commune located in Brăila County, Muntenia, Romania. It is composed of six villages: Agaua, Cistia, Frecăței, Salcia, Stoienești and Titcov.
