= Tufești =

- Commune
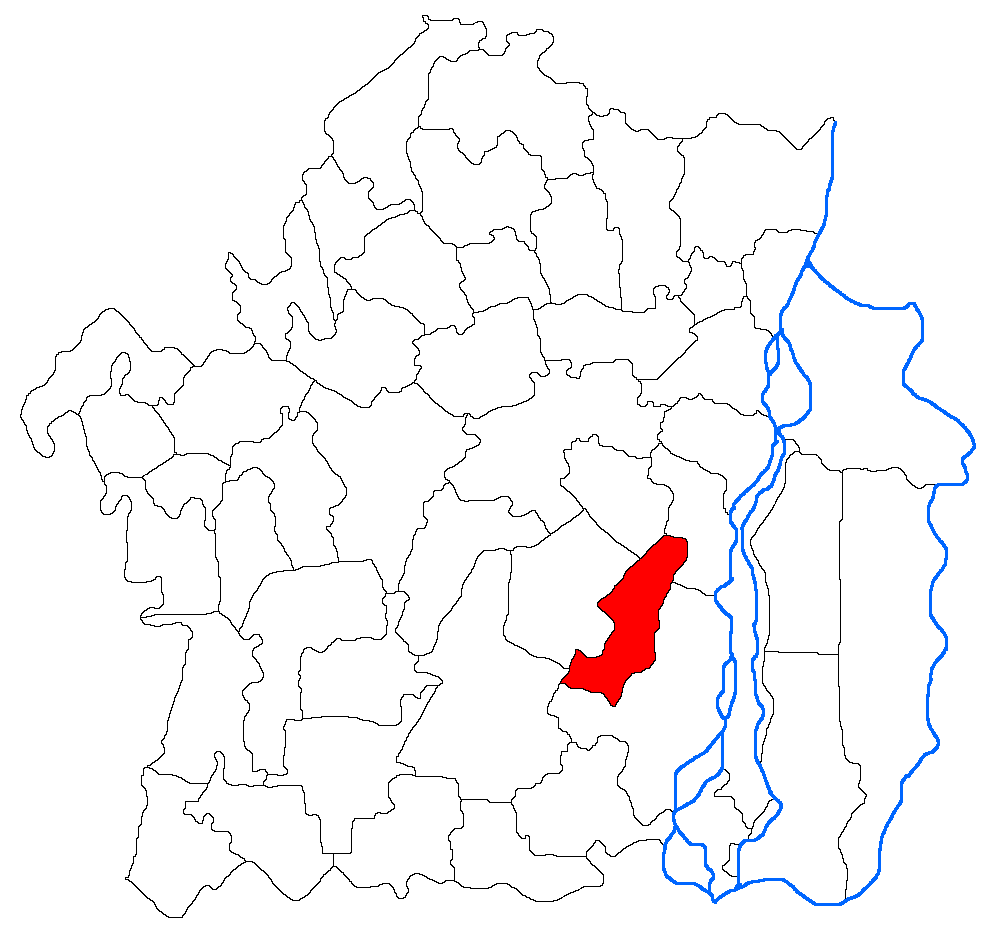
- Location in Brăila County

- Location in Romania
- Coordinates: 44.9854°N 27.7946°E
- Country: Romania
- County: Brăila
- Population (2021-12-01): 4,446
- Time zone: UTC+02:00 (EET)
  - Summer (DST): UTC+03:00 (EEST)
- Vehicle reg.: BR

Tufești is a commune located in Brăila County, Muntenia, Romania. It is composed of a single village, Tufești.
