= Siliștea, Brăila =

Siliștea
- Commune
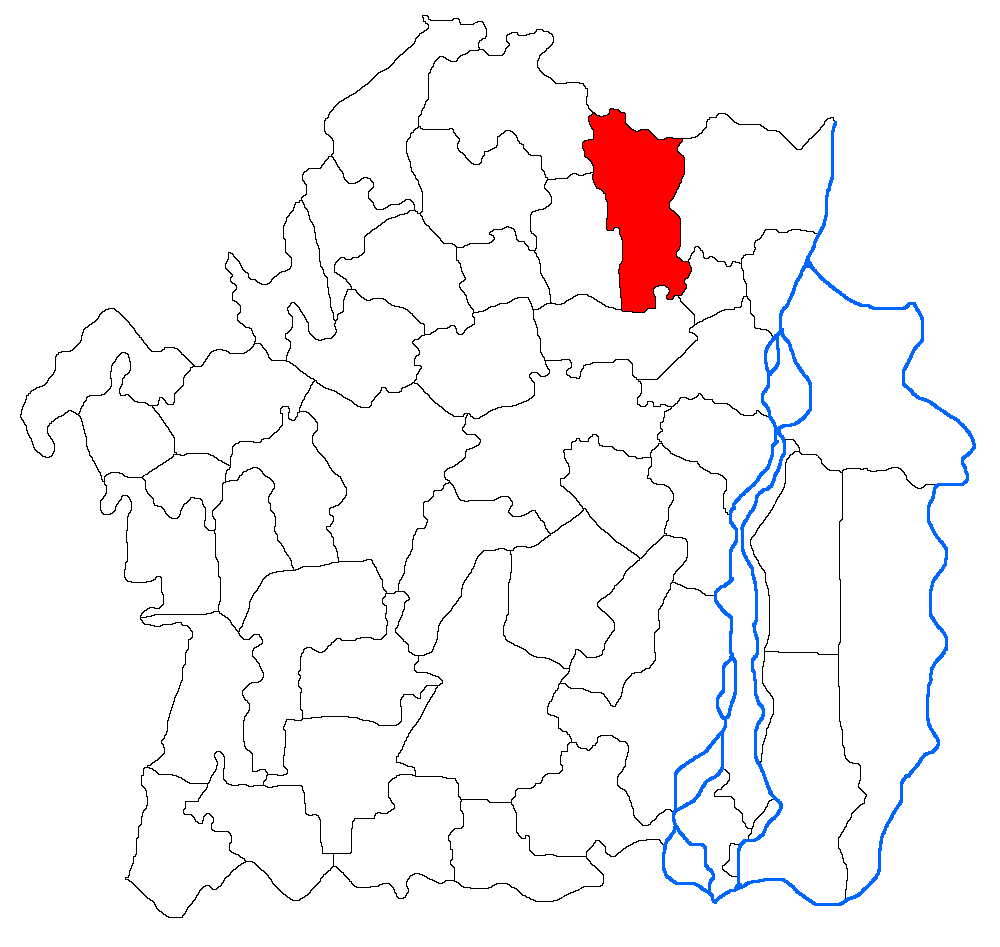
- Location in Brăila County

- Location in Romania
- Coordinates: 45°19′N 27°50′E
- Country: Romania
- County: Brăila
- Population (2021-12-01): 1,465
- Time zone: EET/EEST (UTC+2/+3)
- Vehicle reg.: BR

Siliștea is a commune located in Brăila County, Muntenia, Romania. It is composed of six villages: Cotu Lung, Cotu Mihalea, Mărtăcești, Muchea, Siliștea and Vameșu.
