= Romanu =

- Commune
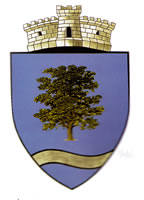
- Coat of arms

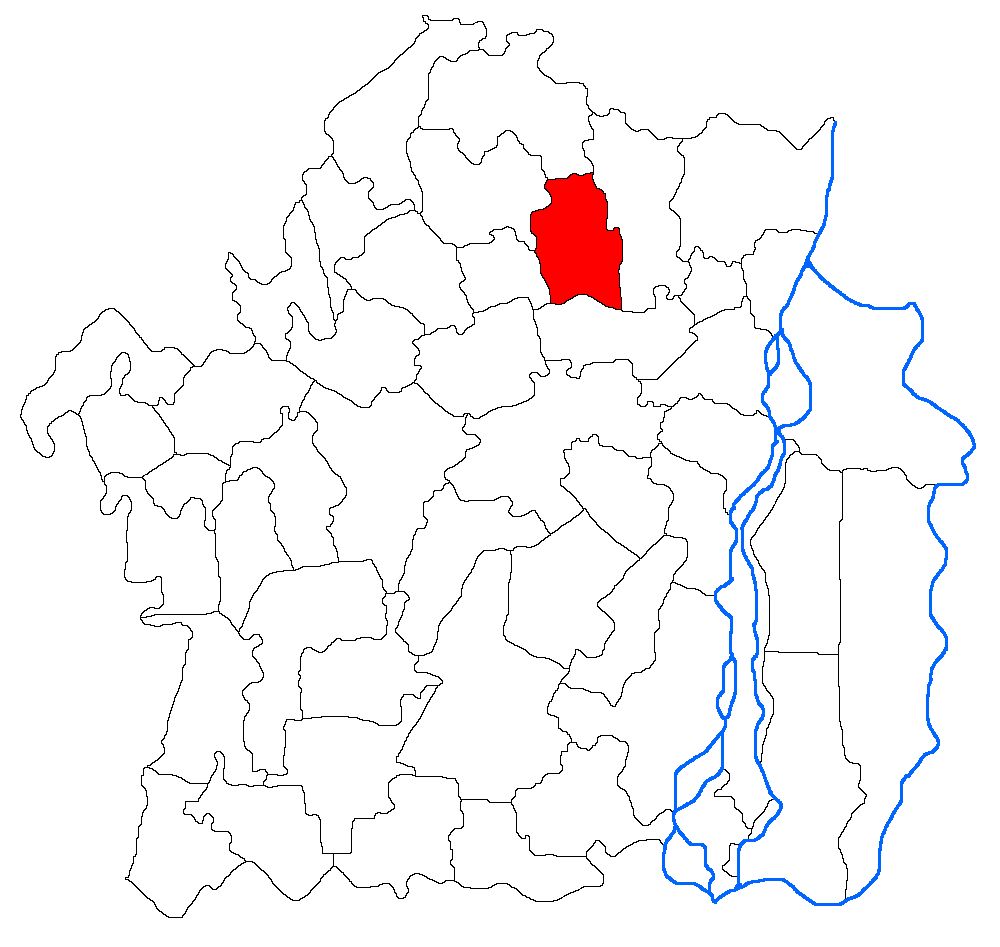
- Location in Brăila County

- Location in Romania
- Coordinates: 45°17′N 27°44′E
- Country: Romania
- County: Brăila

Government
  - Mayor (2020–2024): Steluța Ioniță (PSD)
- Area: 70.92 km^{2} (27.38 sq mi)
- Population (2021-12-01): 1,602
  - Density: 23/km^{2} (59/sq mi)
- Time zone: EET/EEST (UTC+2/+3)
- Postal code: 817115
- Vehicle reg.: BR
- Website: primariaromanu.ro

Romanu is a commune located in Brăila County, Muntenia, Romania. It is composed of two villages, Oancea and Romanu.
