= Roșiori, Brăila =

Roșiori
- Commune
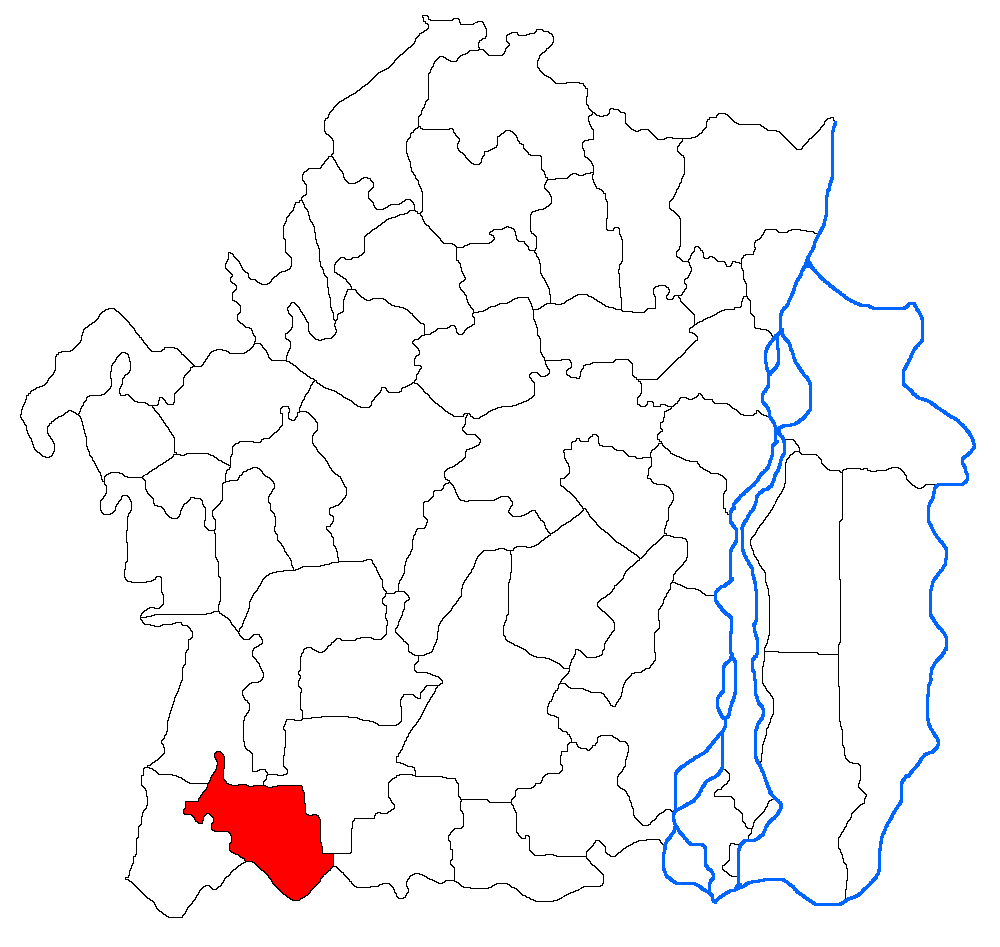
- Location in Brăila County

- Location in Romania
- Coordinates: 44°48′N 27°23′E
- Country: Romania
- County: Brăila
- Population (2021-12-01): 2,297
- Time zone: EET/EEST (UTC+2/+3)
- Vehicle reg.: BR

Roșiori is a commune located in Brăila County, Muntenia, Romania. It is composed of four villages: Colțea, Florica, Pribeagu and Roșiori.
