= Mircea Vodă, Brăila =

Mircea Vodă
- Commune
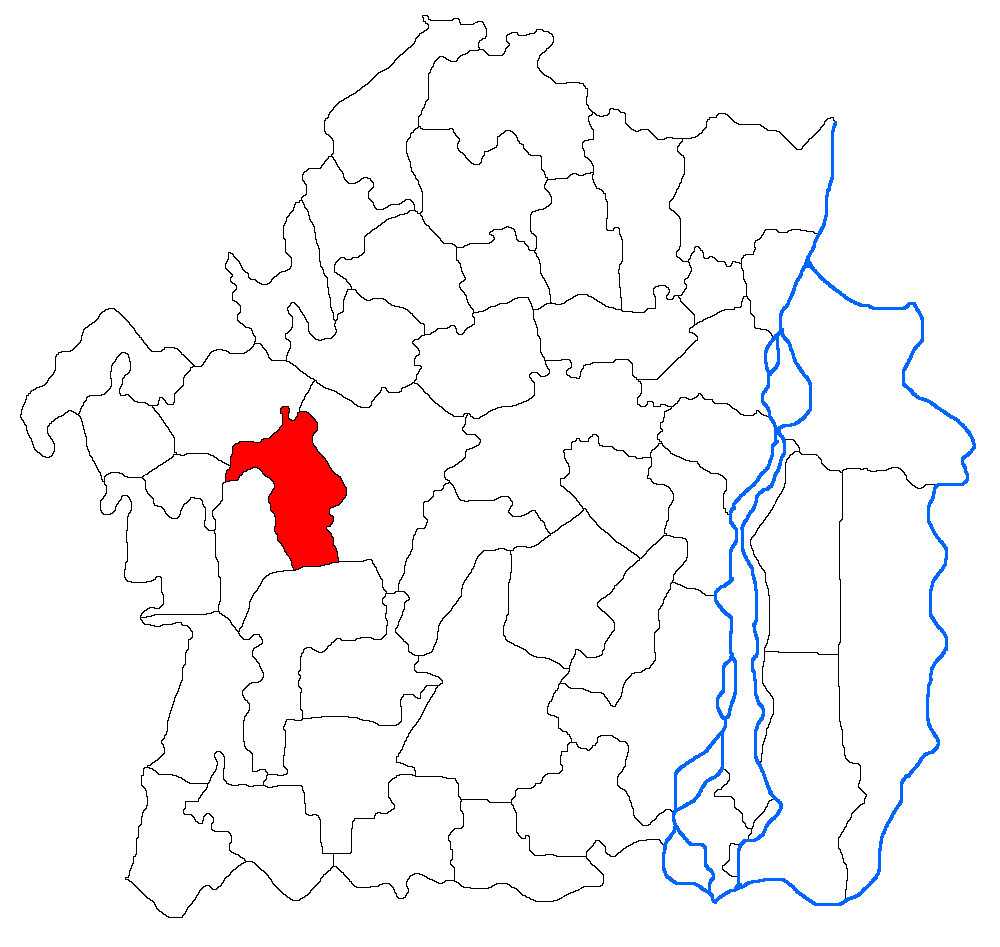
- Location in Brăila County

- Location in Romania
- Coordinates: 45°07′N 27°22′E
- Country: Romania
- County: Brăila
- Population (2021-12-01): 2,812
- Time zone: EET/EEST (UTC+2/+3)
- Vehicle reg.: BR

Mircea Vodă is a commune located in Brăila County, Muntenia, Romania. It is composed of two villages, Dedulești and Mircea Vodă.
