= Racovița, Brăila =

Racovița
- Commune
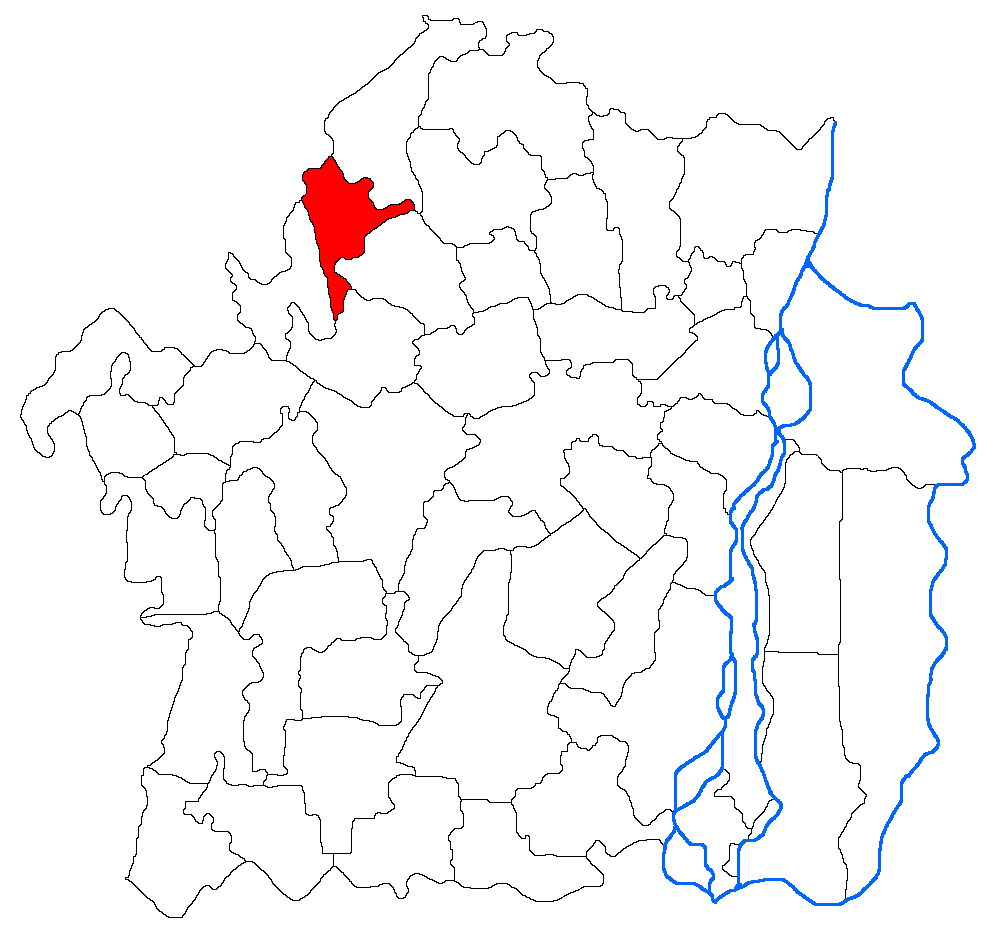
- Location in Brăila County

- Location in Romania
- Coordinates: 45°18′02″N 27°27′41″E
- Country: Romania
- County: Brăila
- Population (2021-12-01): 892
- Time zone: EET/EEST (UTC+2/+3)
- Vehicle reg.: BR

Racovița is a commune located in Brăila County, Muntenia, Romania. It is composed of three villages: Corbeni, Custura and Racovița.
