= Salcia Tudor =

- Commune
- Coat of arms

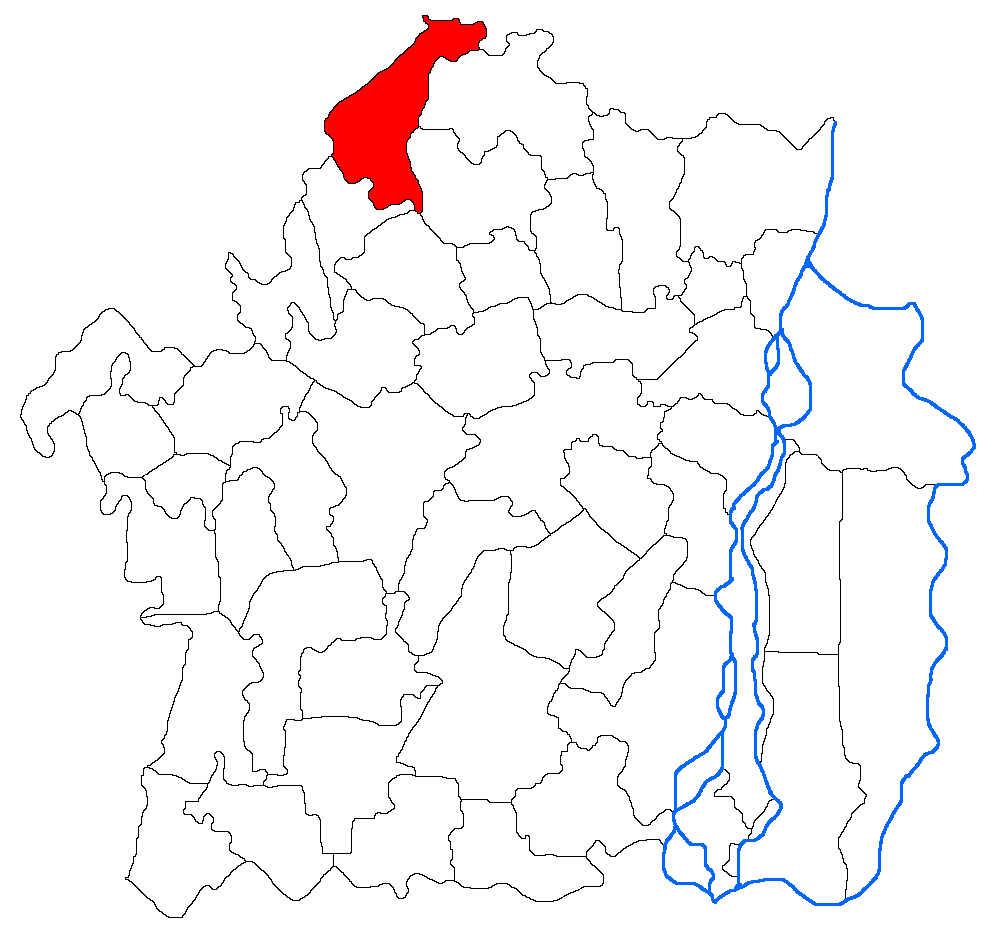
- Location in Brăila County

- Location in Romania
- Coordinates: 45°22′N 27°31′E
- Country: Romania
- County: Brăila
- Population (2021-12-01): 2,220
- Time zone: EET/EEST (UTC+2/+3)
- Vehicle reg.: BR

Salcia Tudor is a commune located in Brăila County, Muntenia, Romania. It is composed of five villages: Ariciu, Cuza Vodă, Gulianca, Olăneasca and Salcia Tudor.
