= Scorțaru Nou =

- Commune
- Coat of arms

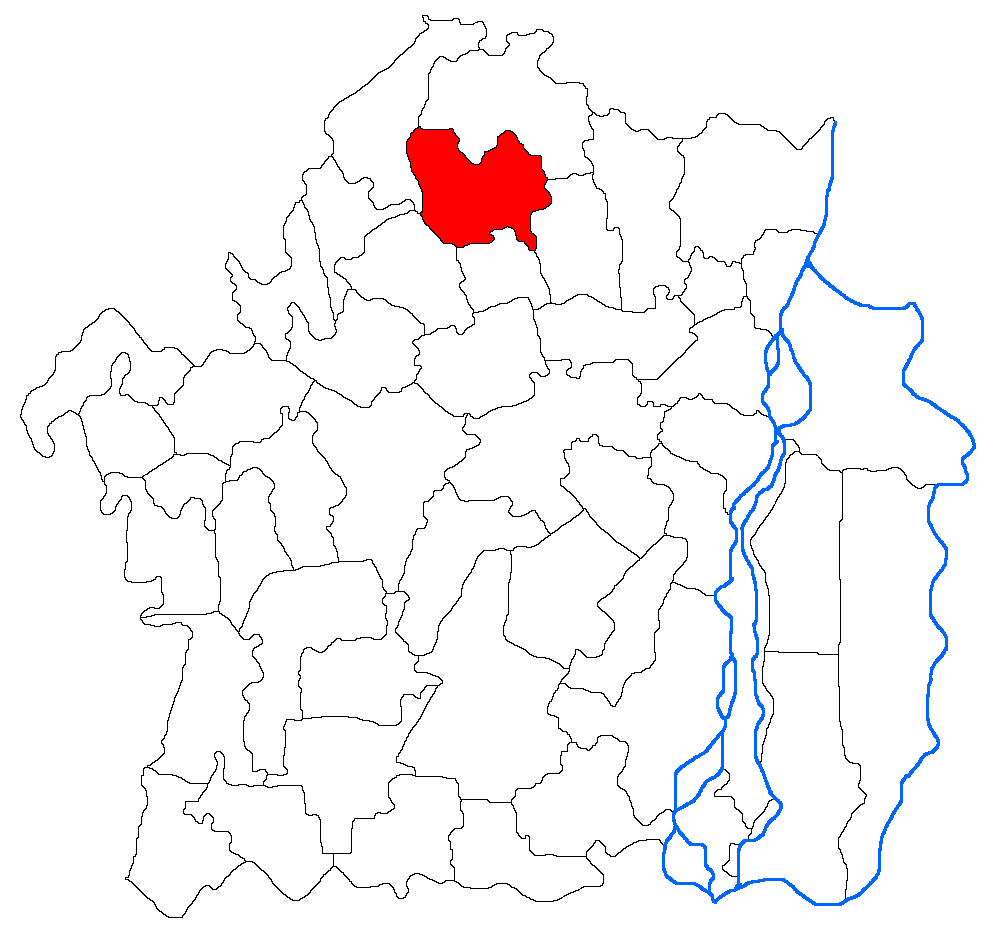
- Location in Brăila County

- Location in Romania
- Coordinates: 45°19′N 27°36′E
- Country: Romania
- County: Brăila
- Population (2021-12-01): 1,085
- Time zone: EET/EEST (UTC+2/+3)
- Vehicle reg.: BR

Scorțaru Nou is a commune located in Brăila County, Muntenia, Romania. It is composed of four villages: Gurguieți, Pitulați, Scorțaru Nou and Sihleanu. It formerly included Deșirați and Nicolae Bălcescu villages, now depopulated.
