= Brăila County =

County of Romania

Brăila County Județul Brăila
- County
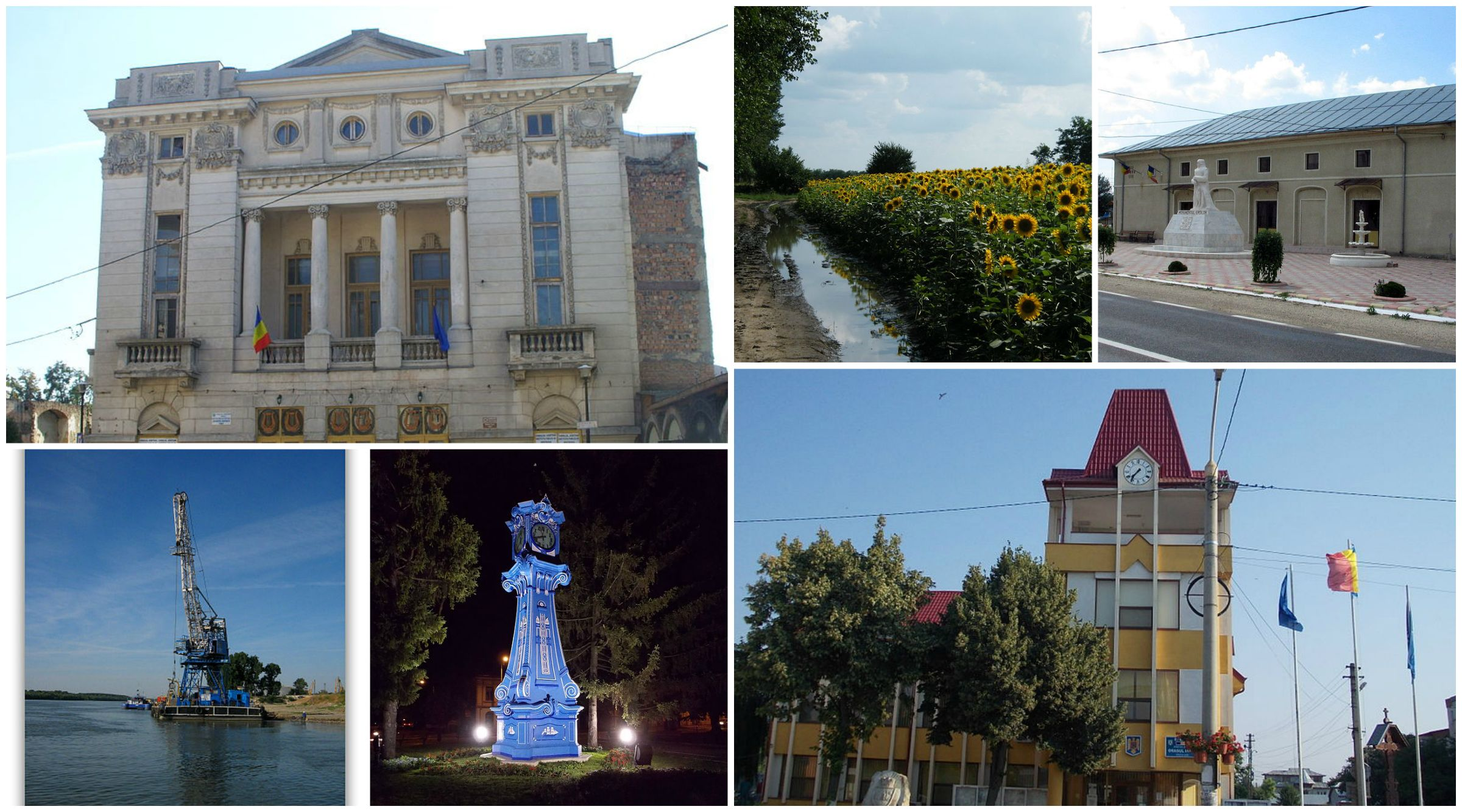

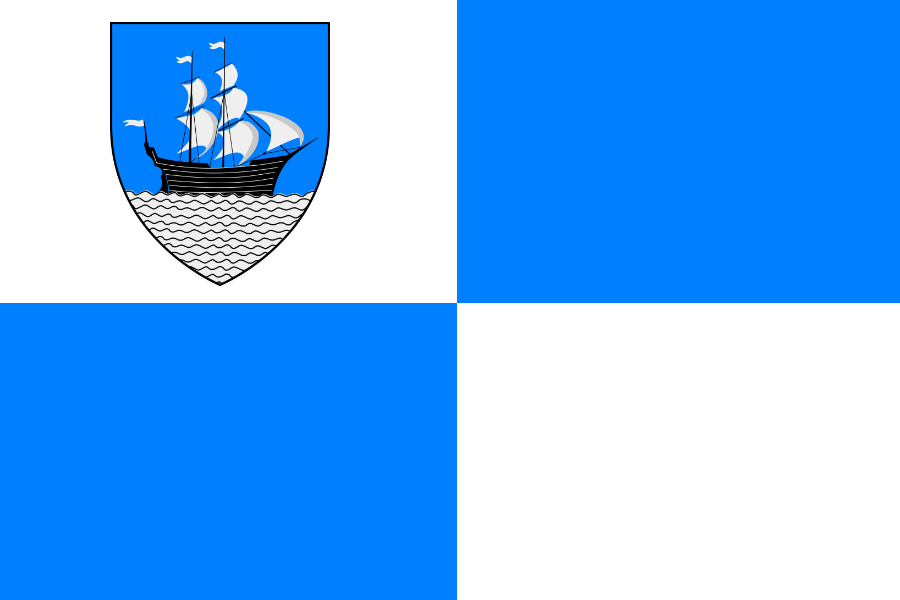
- Flag Coat of arms

- Coordinates: 45.11°N 27.68°E
- Country: Romania
- Development region^{1}: Sud-Est
- Historic region: Muntenia
- Capital city (Reședință de județ): Brăila

Government
  - Type: County Council
  - President of the County Council: Francisk-Iulian Chiriac (PSD)
  - Prefect^{2}: Iulian Timofei

Area
  - County: 4,766 km^{2} (1,840 sq mi)
  - Rank: 32nd in Romania

Population (2021-12-01)
  - County: 281,452
  - Rank: 30th in Romania
  - Density: 59.05/km^{2} (152.9/sq mi)
  - Urban: 172,533
- Time zone: UTC+2 (EET)
  - Summer (DST): UTC+3 (EEST)
- Postal Code: 81wxyz^{3}
- Area code: +40 x39^{4}
- Car Plates: BR^{5}
- GDP: US$1.930 billion (2015)
- GDP/capita: US$6,315 (2015)
- Website: County Council; County Prefecture
- ^{1}The developing regions of Romania have no administrative role. They were formed just to attract funds from the European Union^{2} as of 2007, the Prefect is not a politician, but a public functionary. He (or she) is not allowed to be a member of a political party, and is banned to have any political activity in the first six months after the resignation (or exclusion) from the public functionary corps^{3}w, x, y, and z are digits that indicate the city, the street, part of the street, or even the building of the address^{4}x is a digit indicating the operator: 2 for the former national operator, Romtelecom, and 3 for the other ground telephone networks^{5}used on both the plates of the vehicles that operate only in the county limits (like utility vehicles, ATVs, etc.), and the ones used outside the county

Brăila County (Romanian pronunciation: [brəˈila]) is a county (județ) of Romania, in Muntenia, with the capital city at Brăila.

== Demographics ==
At the 2021 Romanian census, Brăila County had a population of 281,452 (172,533 people in urban areas and 108,919 people in rural areas.) and the population density was 59.1/km^{2} (152.9/sq mi).

- Romanians – 98%
- Romani, Russians, Lipovans, Aromanians, and others - c. 2%

Year	County population
1948	271,251
1956	297,276 ▲
1966	339,954 ▲
1977	377,954 ▲
1992	392,069 ▲
2002	373,174 ▼
2011	304,925 ▼
2021	281,452 ▼

== Geography ==
This county has a total area of 4,766 km^{2} (1,840 sq mi).

All the county lies on a flat plane: the Bărăgan Plain, one of the best areas for growing cereals in Romania.

On the east side there is the Danube, which forms an island – the Great Brăila Island –surrounded by the Măcin channel, Cremenea channel, and Vâlciu channel. On the northern side there is the Siret River and on the north-western side there is the Buzău River.

=== Climate ===
The climate is temperate-continental, characterized by hot, dry summers and cold winters, often marked by blizzards. The average annual temperature varies between 10.3°C and 10.5°C, with high annual amplitude values recorded, specifically 25.2°C between summer and winter. In Brăila County, the highest temperature ever recorded in the country (to date) was registered on August 10, 1951, at the Ion Sion meteorological station in Bărăgan, reaching 44.5°C. The absolute minimum temperature (-30.0°C) was recorded at the Griviţa meteorological station on January 25, 1942. The maximum amplitude of absolute extreme temperature values in Brăila County is 74.5°C, ranking second in the country after Braşov County, where this amplitude reaches 77.4°C. Annual atmospheric precipitation averages 400–500 mm, with the majority falling during the warm half of the year, often as heavy showers. Generally, the low amount of precipitation and the frequency of drought years (such as 1896, 1908, 1927, 1934, 1938, 1946, 1951, 1968, 1994, 1996) pose serious problems for agricultural crops, requiring water deficits to be compensated through irrigation. The predominant winds blow most frequently from the North (31.5%) and Northeast (18%), with average annual speeds varying between 1.5 and 5.3 m/s. Maximum speeds are recorded during winter, often exceeding 100 km/h (in February 1954, wind speeds reached 125 km/h). The most known winds are the Crivăț (a cold, dry winter wind blowing from the North and Northeast, caused by the Siberian Anticyclone) and the Suhovei (a hot, dry summer wind blowing from the East).

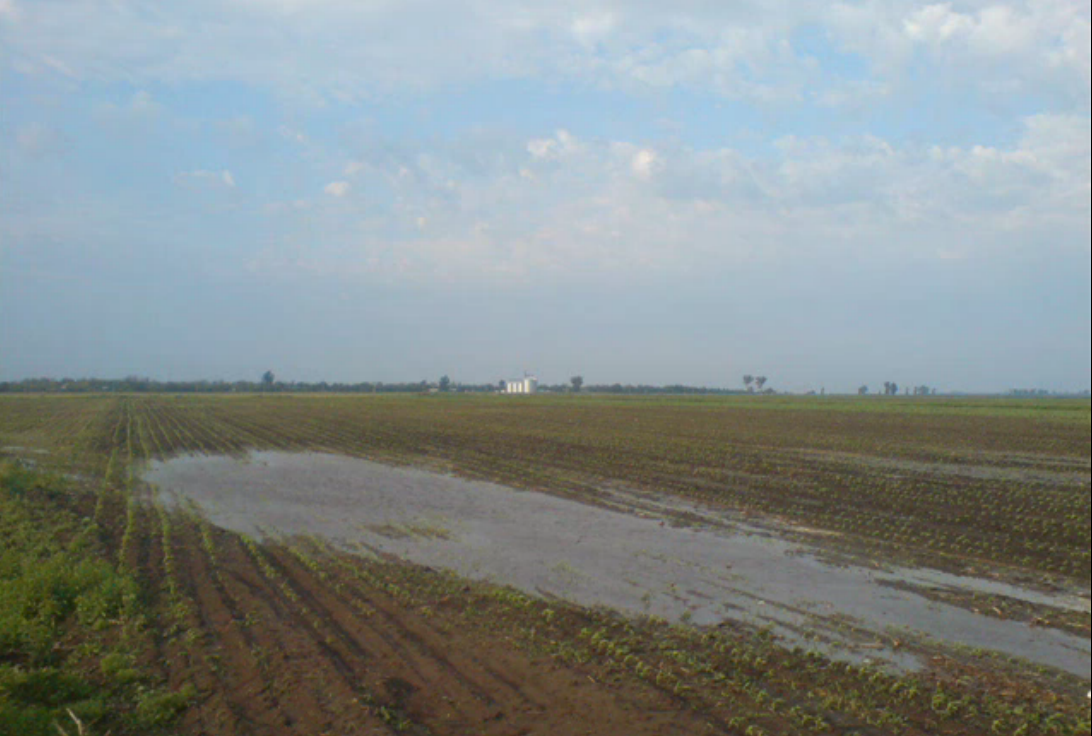
Landscape in Brăila County in May 2012

=== Neighbours ===
- Tulcea County in the east.
- Buzău County in the west.
- Galați County and Vrancea County in the north.
- Ialomița County and Constanța County in the south.

== Economy ==
The agriculture is the main occupation in the county. Industry is almost entirely concentrated in the city of Brăila. The predominant industries in the county are:

- Food industry.
- Textile industry.
- Mechanical components industry.

In Brăila there is an important harbour, once the biggest cereal harbour in Romania.

== Tourism ==
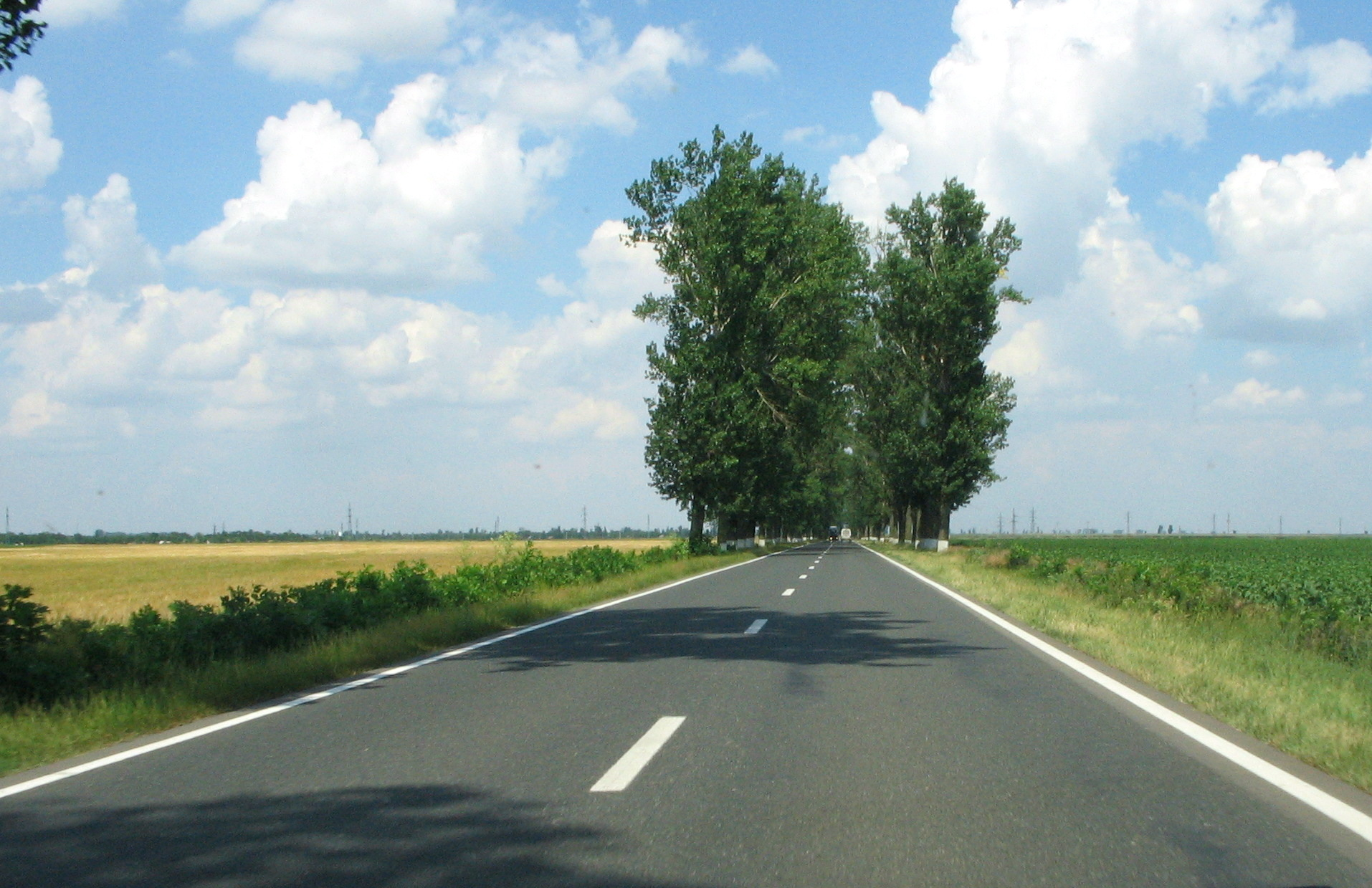
DN21, a road in Romania, in Brăila County

The main tourist destinations are:

- The city of Brăila.
- The Lacu Sărat resort.

== Politics ==
The Brăila County Council, renewed at the 2020 local elections, consists of 30 counsellors, with the following party composition:

Party	Seats	Current County Council
Social Democratic Party (PSD)	17	
National Liberal Party (PNL)	10	
People's Movement Party (PMP)	3	

== Administrative divisions ==
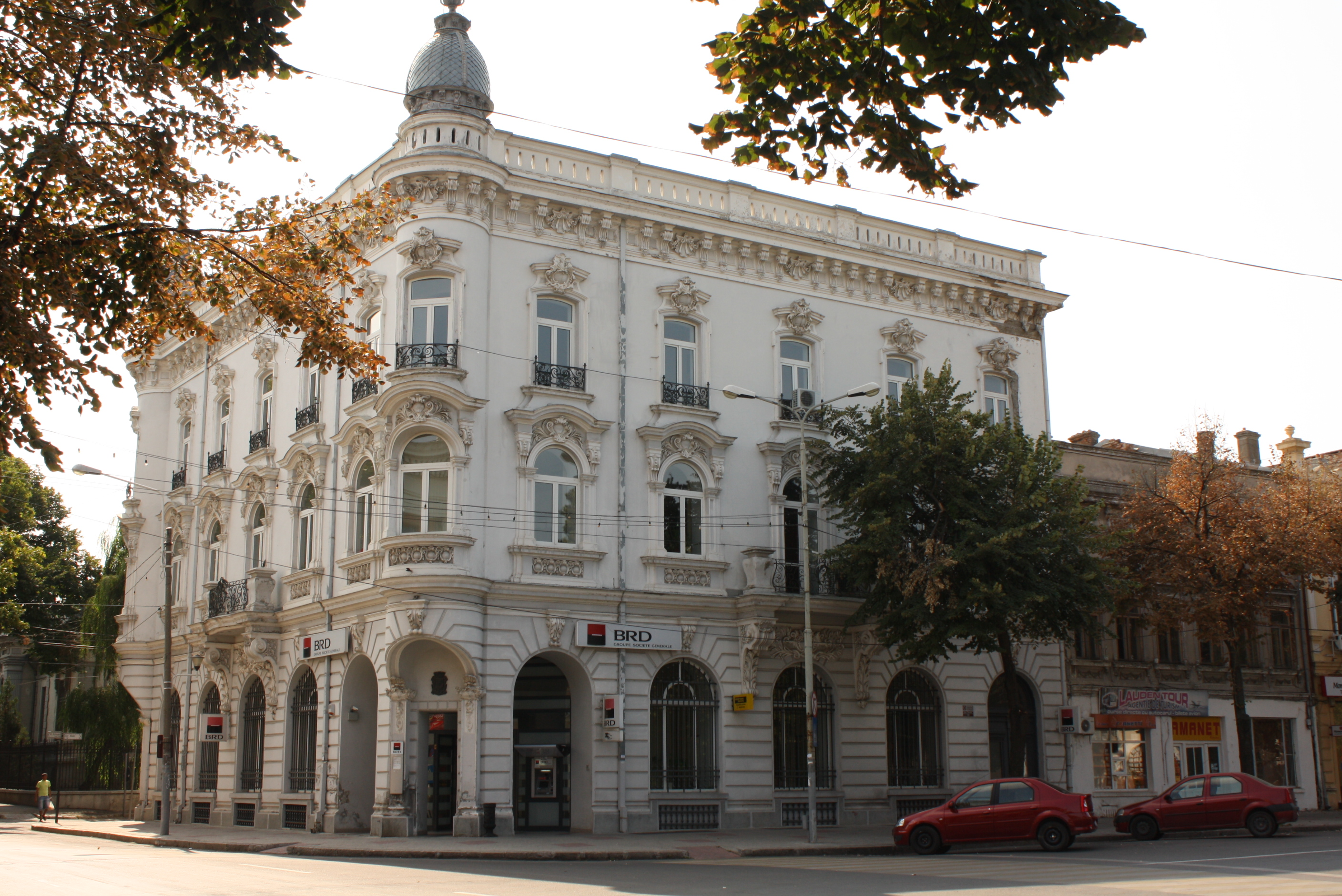
Brăila

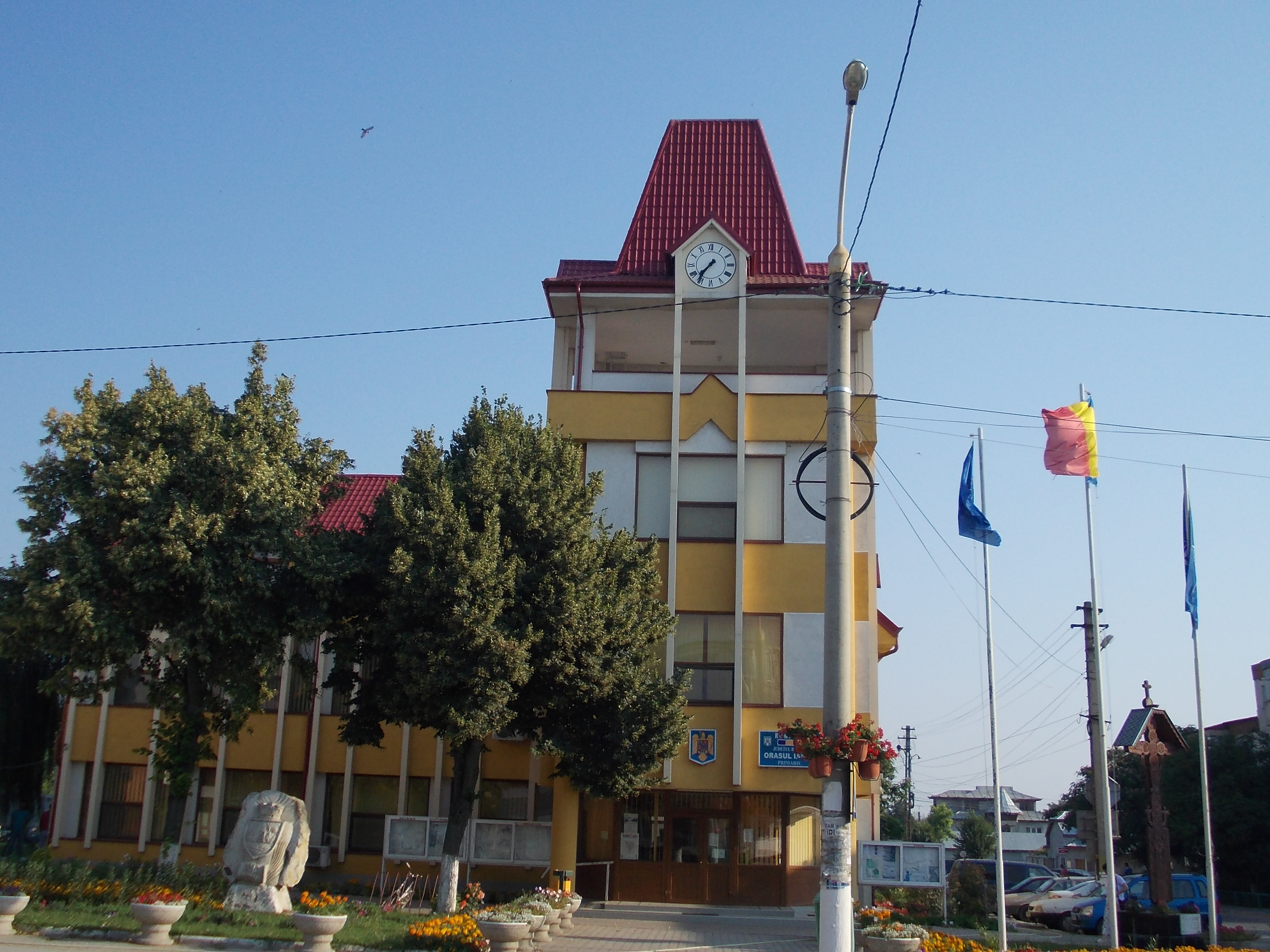
City hall in Ianca, the second largest urban locality in Brăila County

Brăila County has 1 municipality, 3 towns, and 40 communes

- Municipalities
  - Brăila – capital city; population: 154,686 (as of 2021)
- Towns
  - Făurei
  - Ianca
  - Însurăței
- Communes
  - Bărăganul
  - Berteștii de Jos
  - Bordei Verde
  - Cazasu
  - Chiscani
  - Ciocile
  - Cireșu
  - Dudești
  - Frecăței
  - Galbenu
  - Gemenele
  - Grădiștea
  - Gropeni
  - Jirlău
  - Mărașu
  - Măxineni
  - Mircea Vodă
  - Movila Miresii
  - Racovița
  - Râmnicelu
  - Romanu
  - Roșiori
  - Salcia Tudor
  - Scorțaru Nou
  - Siliștea
  - Stăncuța
  - Surdila-Găiseanca
  - Surdila-Greci
  - Șuțești
  - Tichilești
  - Traian
  - Tudor Vladimirescu
  - Tufești
  - Ulmu
  - Unirea
  - Vădeni
  - Victoria
  - Vișani
  - Viziru
  - Zăvoaia

== Historical county ==
Județul Brăila
- County (Județ)
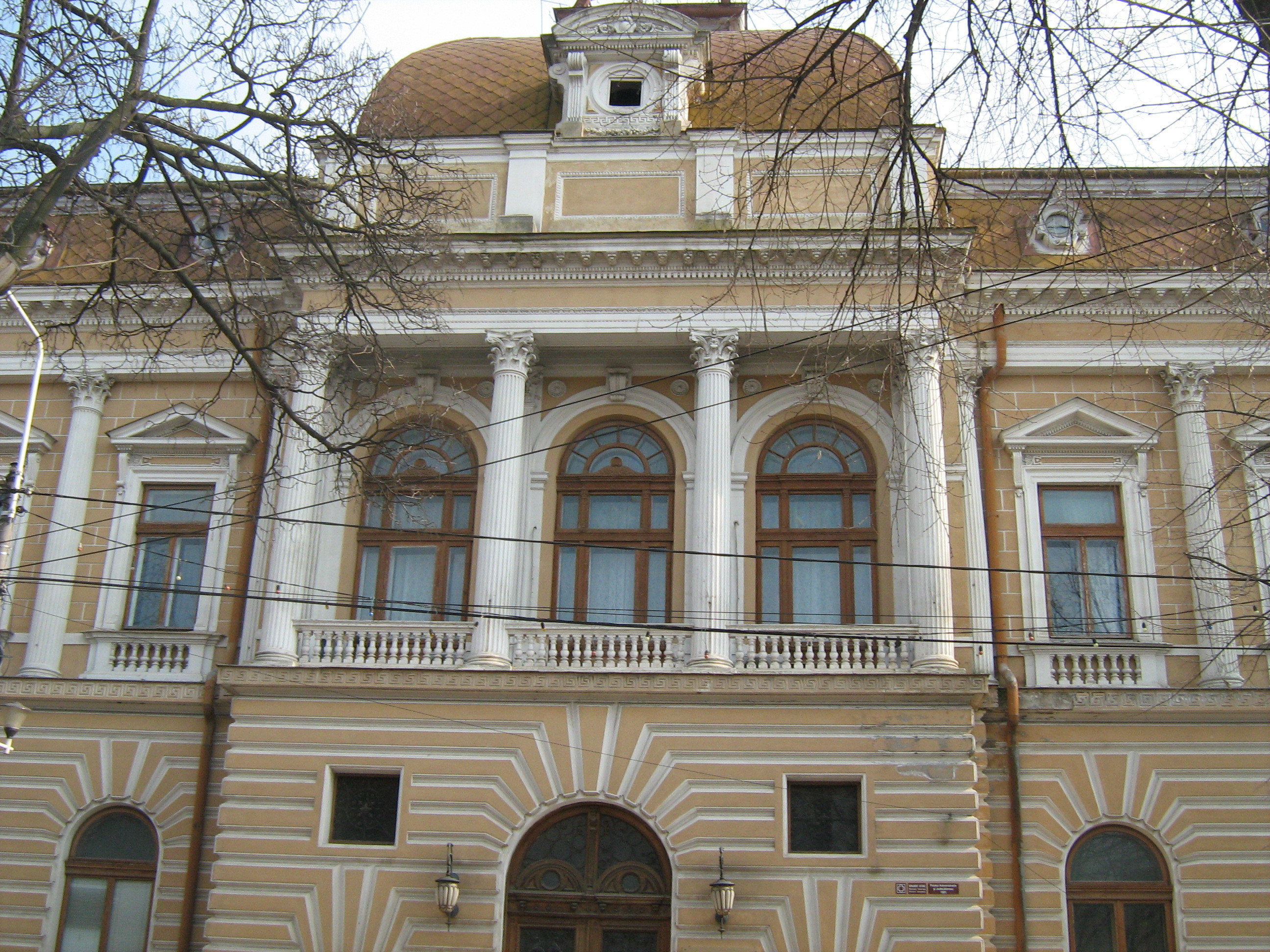
- The Brăila County prefecture and court building from the interwar period, now the engineering building of Dunărea de Jos University.

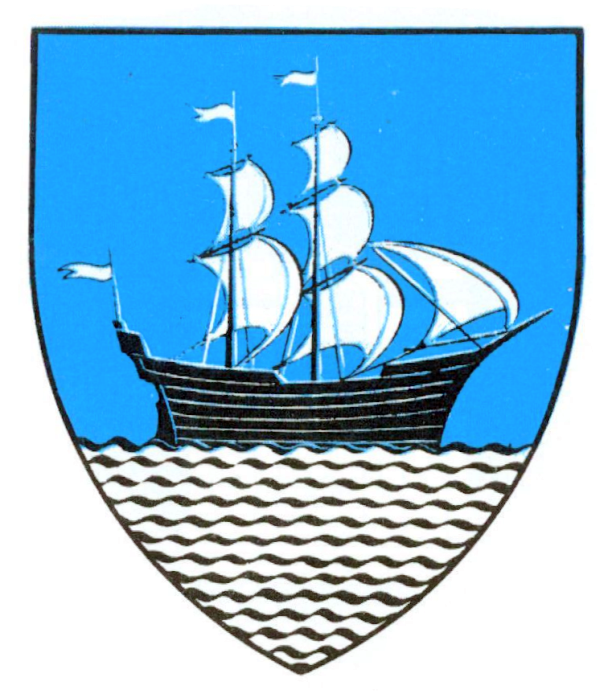
- Coat of arms

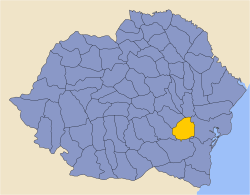
- Country: Romania
- Historic region: Muntenia
- Capital city (Reședință de județ): Brăila

Area
  - Total: 4,286 km^{2} (1,655 sq mi)

Population (1930)
  - Total: 219,932
  - Density: 51.31/km^{2} (132.9/sq mi)
- Time zone: UTC+2 (EET)
  - Summer (DST): UTC+3 (EEST)

Historically, the county was located in the southeastern part of Greater Romania, in the northeastern part of the Muntenia region. Its territory included the portions of the current county to the east and south-east of the Buzău River. It was bordered on the west by the counties of Buzău and Râmnicu-Sărat, to the north by Covurlui County, to the east by Tulcea County, and to the south by the counties of Constanța and Ialomița.

=== Administration ===
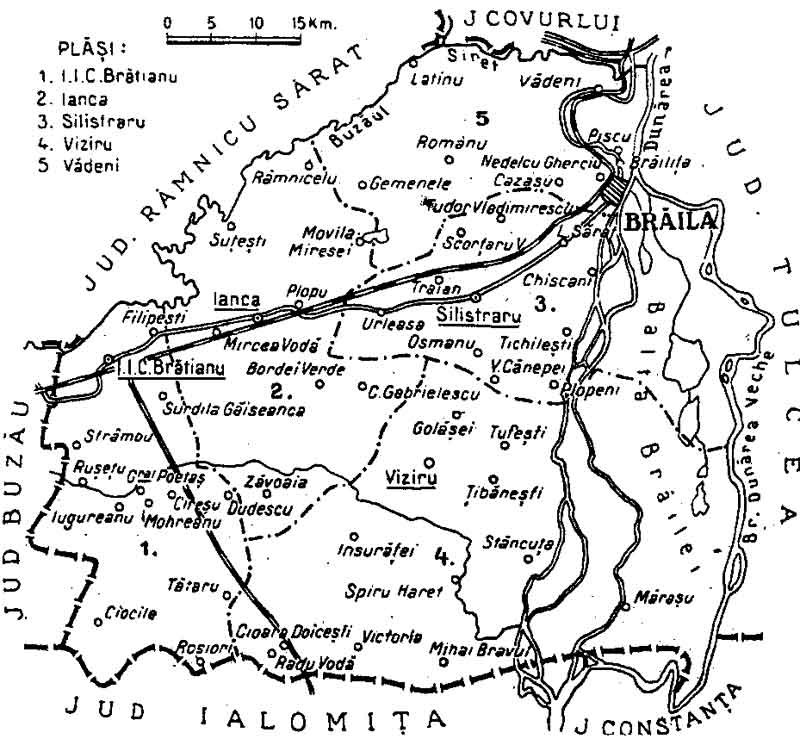
Map of Brăila County as constituted in 1938.

The county was originally divided administratively into four districts (plăși):

1. Plasa Călmățui, with headquarters at Făurei
2. Plasa Ianca, with headquarters at Ianca
3. Plasa Silistraru, with headquarters at Silistraru
4. Plasa Viziru, with headquarters at Viziru

Subsequently, Plasa Călmățui, was abolished and two new districts were established in its place:

1. Plasa I.I.C. Brătianu, with headquarters at Făurei
2. Plasa Vădeni, with headquarters at Vădeni

=== Population ===
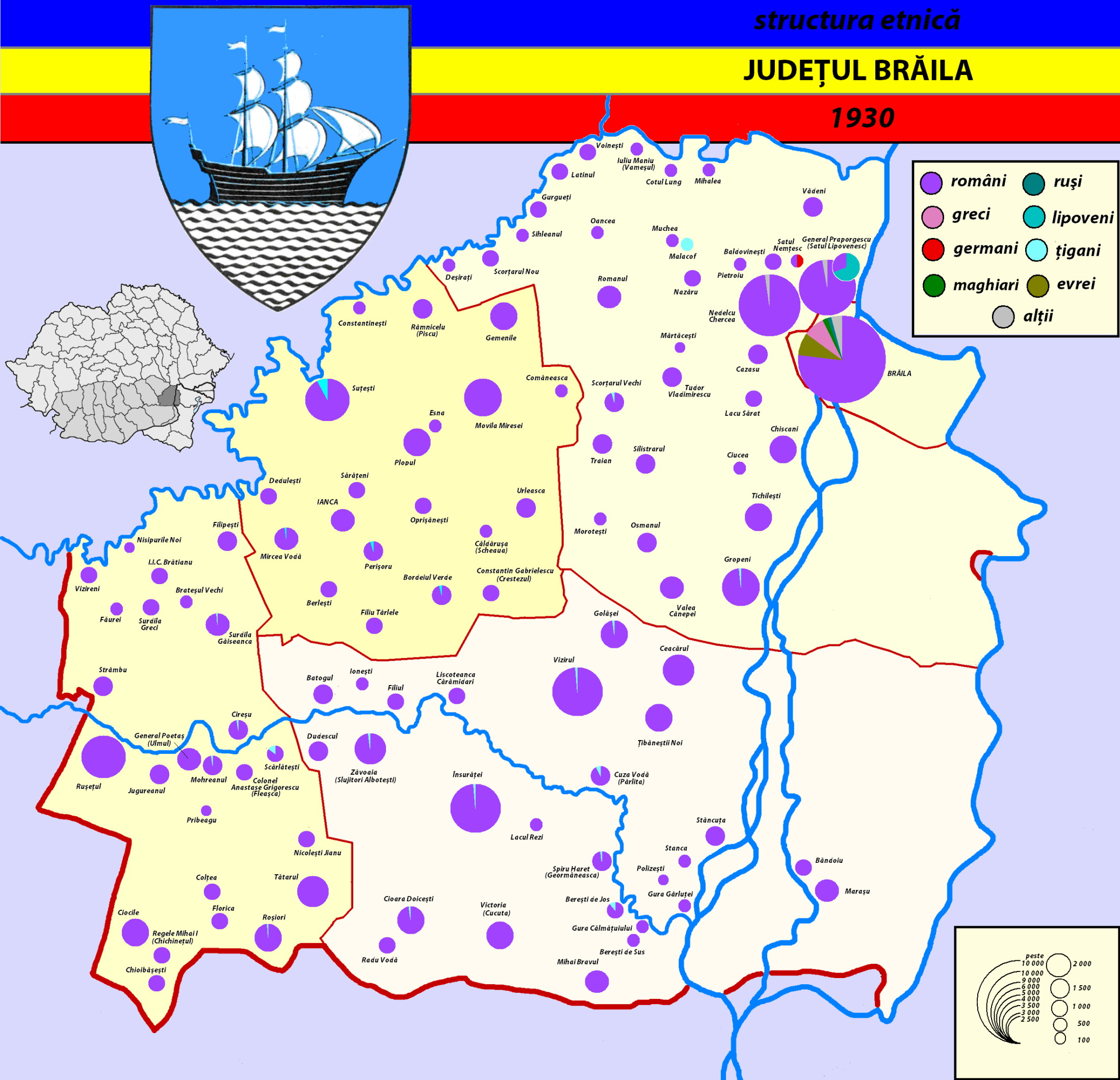
Map of Brăila County's ethnic groups as reported in the 1930 census.

According to the 1930 census data, the county population was 219,831 inhabitants, ethnically divided as follows: 89.4% Romanians, 3.1% Jews, 2.2% Greeks, 0.7% Hungarians, 0.6% Russians, as well as other minorities. From the religious point of view, the population was 93.6% Eastern Orthodox, 3.3% Jewish, 1.2% Roman Catholic, as well as other minorities.

==== Urban population ====
In 1930, the county's urban population was 68,347 inhabitants, comprising 75.4% Romanians, 9.7% Jews, 6.7% Greeks, 1.7% Hungarians, 1.6% Russians, as well as other minorities. Mother tongues among the urban population were Romanian (82.6%), Greek (5.8%), Yiddish (4.8%), Russian (1.9%), Hungarian (1.5%), as well as other minorities. From the religious point of view, the urban population was composed of 84.4% Eastern Orthodox, 10.4% Jewish, 3.2% Roman Catholic, as well as other minorities.
