= Postal codes in Romania =

Postal codes details and history in Romania

Four-digit postal codes were introduced in Romania in 1974. Beginning with 1 May 2003, postal codes have six digits, and represent addresses to the street level in major cities (those with population over 50,000). The digits represent (from left to right) the postal area; the county; the city/commune; the last three, depending on the size of the city/commune, represent the commune/city, the street, or the house/building.

The first digit represents the postal region, and the second the county in the postal region. Together, the first two digits identify a county.

The rest of the digits follow this convention:

- 0xxx to 4xxx for larger cities, including the sectors of Bucharest (a postal code identifies a street address or small group of addresses)
- 5xxx to 6xxx for smaller cities (a single postal code, ending in '00', is allocated to an entire city)
- 7xxx for villages. A postal code is allocated to each village. A village that is the head of a commune has a postal code ending in 0 or 5.

== List of codes ==
- 01xxxx - Bucharest Sector 1
- 02xxxx - Bucharest Sector 2
- 03xxxx - Bucharest Sector 3
- 04xxxx - Bucharest Sector 4
- 05xxxx - Bucharest Sector 5
- 06xxxx - Bucharest Sector 6
- 07xxxx - Ilfov County
- 08xxxx - Giurgiu County
- 10xxxx - Prahova County
- 11xxxx - Argeș County
- 12xxxx - Buzău County
- 13xxxx - Dâmbovița County
- 14xxxx - Teleorman County
- 20xxxx - Dolj County
- 21xxxx - Gorj County
- 22xxxx - Mehedinți County
- 23xxxx - Olt County
- 24xxxx - Vâlcea County
- 30xxxx - Timiș County
- 31xxxx - Arad County
- 32xxxx - Caraș-Severin County
- 33xxxx - Hunedoara County
- 40xxxx - Cluj County
- 41xxxx - Bihor County
- 42xxxx - Bistrița-Năsăud County
- 43xxxx - Maramureș County
- 44xxxx - Satu Mare County
- 45xxxx - Sălaj County
- 50xxxx - Brașov County
- 51xxxx - Alba County
- 52xxxx - Covasna County
- 53xxxx - Harghita County
- 54xxxx - Mureș County
- 55xxxx - Sibiu County
- 60xxxx - Bacău County
- 61xxxx - Neamț County
- 62xxxx - Vrancea County
- 70xxxx - Iași County
- 71xxxx - Botoșani County
- 72xxxx - Suceava County
- 73xxxx - Vaslui County
- 80xxxx - Galați County
- 81xxxx - Brăila County
- 82xxxx - Tulcea County
- 90xxxx - Constanța County
- 91xxxx - Călărași County
- 92xxxx - Ialomița County
