= Călmățui =

Călmățui may refer to several places in Romania:

- Călmățui, a village in Grivița Commune, Galați County
- Gura Călmățui, a village in Berteștii de Jos Commune, Brăila County
- Valea Călmățuiului, a village in Însurăței town, Brăila County
- Călmățui (Brăila), a tributary of the Danube in Buzău and Brăila Counties
- Călmățui (Teleorman), a tributary of the Danube in Olt and Teleorman Counties
- Călmățui (Siret), a tributary of the Siret in Galați County

and to:

- Călmățui, Hîncești, a commune in Hîncești district, Moldova
