= Gherăseni =

- Commune
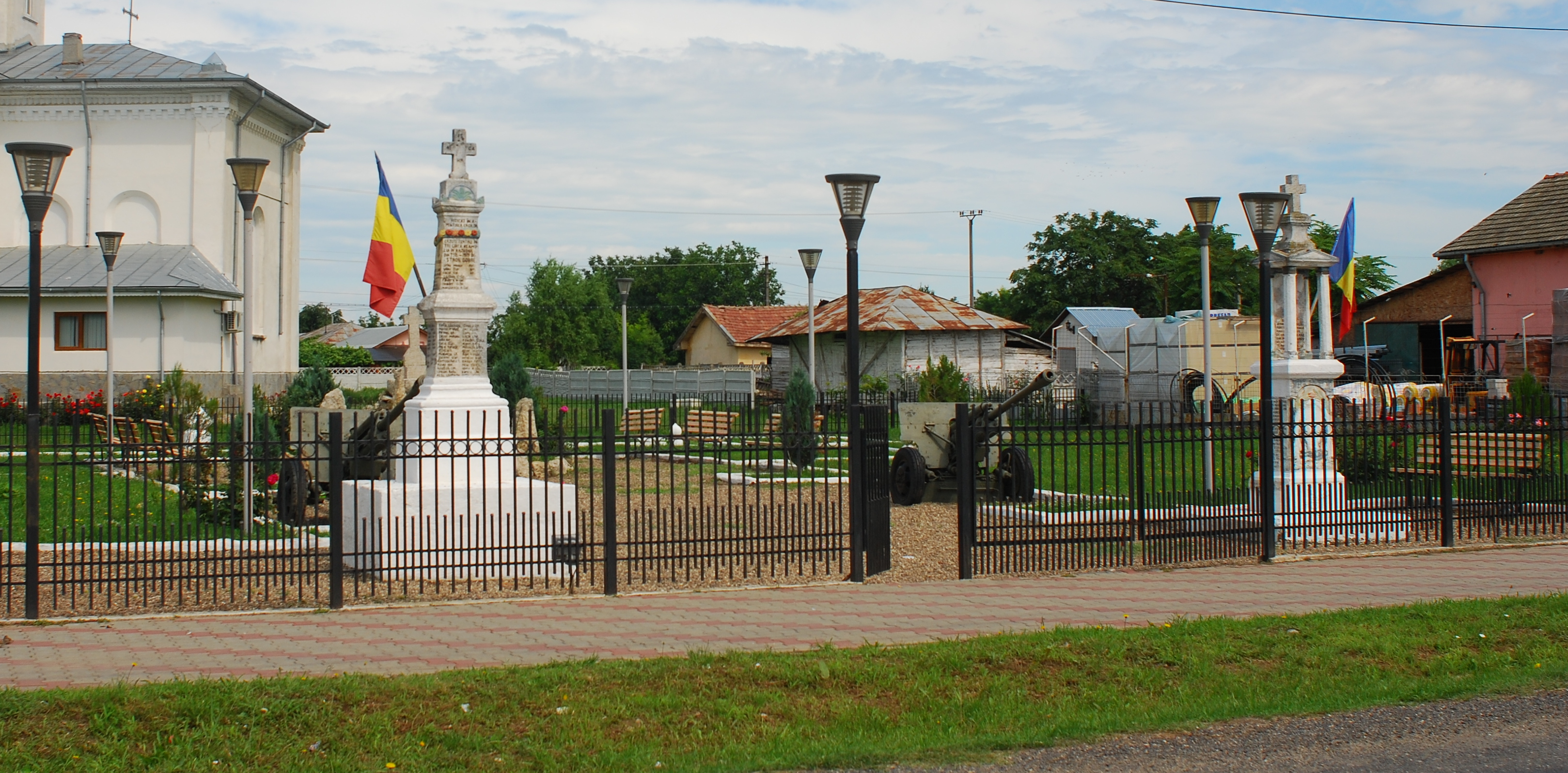
- Monuments in Gherăseni

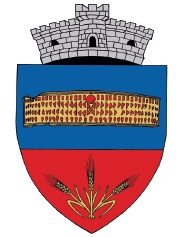
- Coat of arms

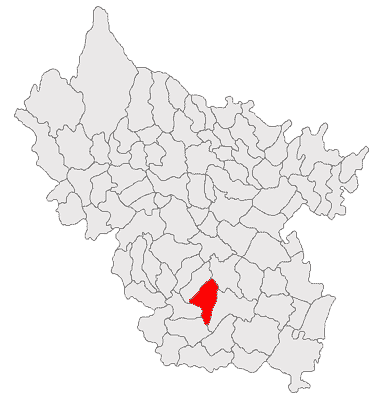
- Location in Buzău County

- Location in Romania
- Coordinates: 45°1′N 26°47′E
- Country: Romania
- County: Buzău
- Subdivisions: Gherăseni, Cremenea, Sudiți

Government
  - Mayor (2020–2024): Vasile Țintă (PSD)
- Area: 56.41 km^{2} (21.78 sq mi)
- Elevation: 80 m (260 ft)
- Population (2021-12-01): 3,079
  - Density: 54.58/km^{2} (141.4/sq mi)
- Time zone: UTC+02:00 (EET)
  - Summer (DST): UTC+03:00 (EEST)
- Postal code: 127245; 127246
- Area code: +(40) 238
- Vehicle reg.: BZ
- Website: www.primariagheraseni.ro

Gherăseni (Romanian pronunciation: [ɡerəˈsenʲ]) is a commune in Buzău County, Muntenia, Romania. It is composed of three villages: Gherăseni, Cremenea, and Sudiți.

== Location ==
Gherăseni is situated on the Bărăgan Plain. The only river crossing the commune is Călmățui, a tributary of the Danube. The commune is located in the southern part of Buzău County, 17 km (11 mi) south-east of Buzău, the county seat. It is crossed by national road DN2C, which connects Buzău to Slobozia.

The commune neighbours Țintești to the north, Smeeni to the east, Mihăilești to the south, Movila Banului to the southwest, and Costești to the west.

== History ==
The name Gherăseni is connected to the name of Ioan (Emanuil) Gerassy, a Greek who had obtained a licence on the boyar monopoly of manufacturing alcoholic beverages in Bucharest during the rule of Alexandru II Ghica (1834–1842). Gerassy owned Câmpineanca, Siliște, and Rotunda estates, which he had bought in the late 1820s.

The Rotunda estate included a large village which featured an Orthodox church. Gerassy managed to convince the inhabitants of that village to move to the present-day location of Gherăseni, 1 km away from the Cremenea village. The first people to settle in the new location apparently arrived around 1829. The Gerassy family also built a new church and a school on the spot.

In 1905, financial difficulties forced Nicolae Gerassy, Ioan's son, to sell the estates to one Stan Vasile.

Historical population
Year	Pop.	±%
2002	3,781	—
2011	3,456	−8.6%
2021	3,079	−10.9%
Source: Census data
