= Glaveș =

- Location within Romania

Location
- Country: Romania
- Counties: Buzău County
- Villages: Movila Banului, Mărgineanu

Physical characteristics
- Mouth: Sărata
  - location: Mihăilești
  - coordinates: 44.9191°N 26.6614°E
- Length: 9 km (5.6 mi)
- Basin size: 79 km^{2} (31 sq mi)

Basin features
- Progression: Sărata→ Ialomița→ Danube→ Black Sea

The Glaveș is a left tributary of the river Sărata in Romania. It flows into the Sărata in Mihăilești. Its length is 9 km (5.6 mi) and its basin size is 79 km^{2} (31 sq mi).
