= Năianca =

- Location within Romania

Location
- Country: Romania
- Counties: Buzău County
- Villages: Năeni, Săhăteni, Găgeni

Physical characteristics
- Mouth: Sărata
  - coordinates: 44.9654°N 26.6572°E
- Length: 25 km (16 mi)
- Basin size: 83 km^{2} (32 sq mi)

Basin features
- Progression: Sărata→ Ialomița→ Danube→ Black Sea

The Năianca is a right tributary of the river Sărata in Romania. It flows into the Sărata near Movila Banului. Its length is 25 km (16 mi) and its basin size is 83 km^{2} (32 sq mi).
