= Armășești =

- Commune
- Location in Ialomița County

- Location in Romania
- Coordinates: 44°44′59″N 26°34′57″E
- Country: Romania
- County: Ialomița

Government
  - Mayor (2020–2024): Marius Carpen (PSD)
- Area: 47.41 km^{2} (18.31 sq mi)
- Elevation: 58 m (190 ft)
- Population (2021-12-01): 1,861
  - Density: 39.25/km^{2} (101.7/sq mi)
- Time zone: UTC+02:00 (EET)
  - Summer (DST): UTC+03:00 (EEST)
- Postal code: 927030
- Area code: +(40) 243
- Vehicle reg.: IL
- Website: www.comunaarmasesti.ro

Armășești is a commune located in Ialomița County, Muntenia, Romania. It is composed of three villages: Armășești, Malu Roșu, and Nenișori. Bărbulești was also one of its component villages until 2006, when it was split off to form a separate commune.

== Geography ==
Armășești is situated at the western edge of the Bărăgan Plain, on the banks of the Sărata River and its right tributary, the river Toți. It is located in the northwestern part of Ialomița County, 8.5 km (5.3 mi) from the city of Urziceni and 70 km (43 mi) from the county seat, Slobozia. The national capital, Bucharest, is about 60 km (37 mi) to the southwest, while the city of Ploiești is 57 km (35 mi) to the northwest.

The commune is crossed by national road DN1D, which connects Urziceni to Ploiești. The Armășești train station serves the CFR Main Line 700, which connects Bucharest to Brăila, Galați and the border with Moldova at Giurgiulești, as well as Line 701, which starts in Urziceni and ends in Ploiești.

== Education ==
Armășești features an agricultural school, the first of its type in Muntenia and the third in Romania. The school was built in 1883–1885 by Iordache Zossima, a landowner from Nenișori village, who also donated 350 ha (860 acres) of land and 100,000 lei to build a dorm and cover room and board for 240 students. The agricultural school, as well as the Technological High School in Armășești now bear his name.

Historical population
Year	Pop.	±%
1899	1,374	—
1925	1,946	+41.6%
2002	2,531	+30.1%
2011	2,368	−6.4%
2021	1,861	−21.4%
Source: Census data
