= Sărata (Ialomița) =

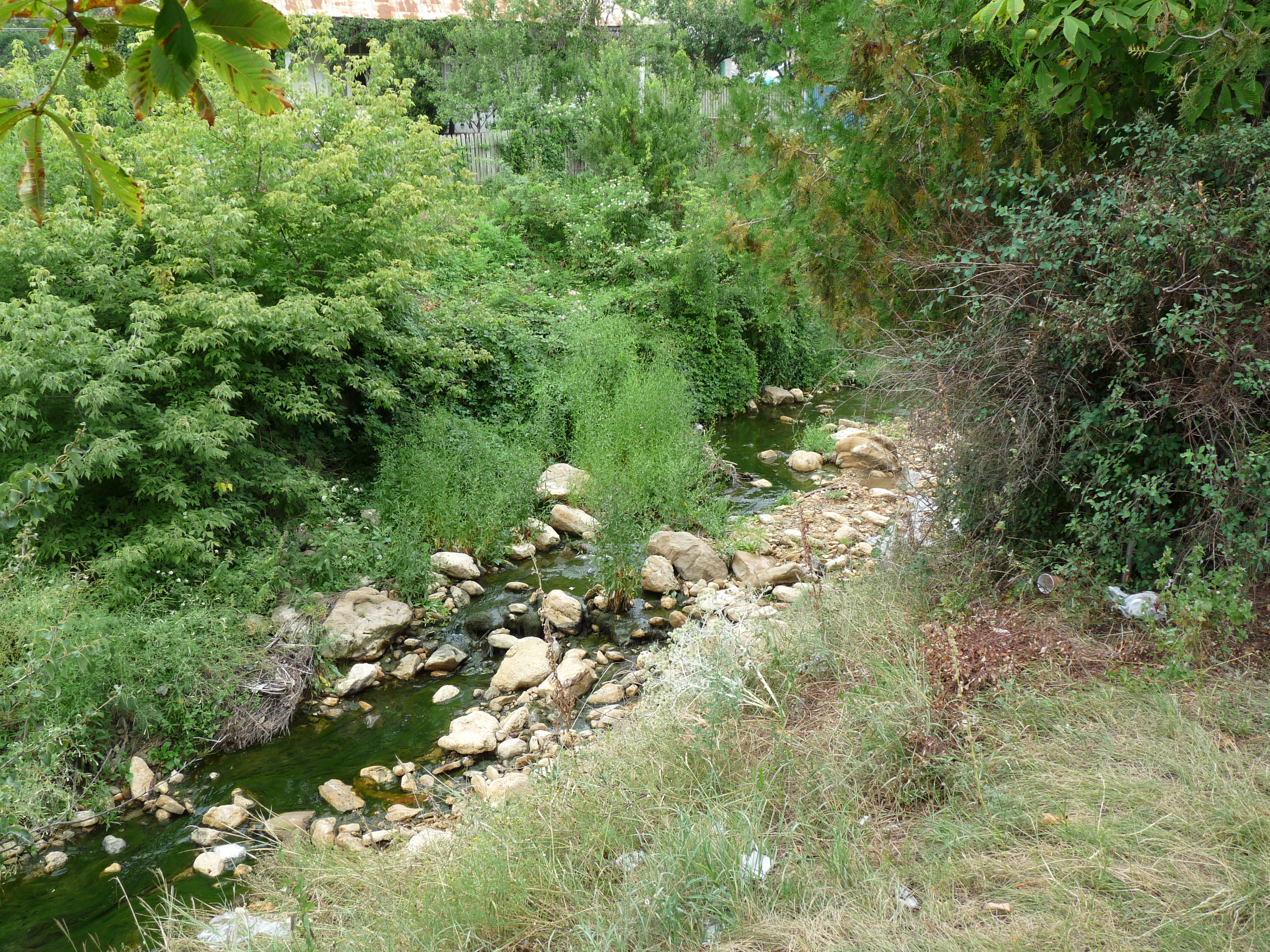

- Location within Romania

Location
- Country: Romania
- Counties: Buzău, Ialomița

Physical characteristics
- Mouth: Ialomița
  - location: Urziceni
  - coordinates: 44.7085°N 26.6230°E
- Length: 72 km (45 mi)
- Basin size: 1,290 km^{2} (500 sq mi)

Basin features
- Progression: Ialomița→ Danube→ Black Sea

The Sărata is a left tributary of the river Ialomița in Romania. It discharges into the Ialomița in Urziceni. It flows through the villages Sărata-Monteoru, Ulmeni, Movila Banului, Mihăilești, Glodeanu Sărat, Armășești, and Bărbulești. Its length is 72 km (45 mi) and its basin size is 1,290 km^{2} (500 sq mi).

== Tributaries ==
The following rivers are tributaries to the river Sărata (from source to mouth):

- Left: Glaveș
- Right: Pietroasa, Năianca, Ghighiu, Toți
