= Bărbulești =

- Commune
- Location in Ialomița County

- Location in Romania
- Coordinates: 44°43′34″N 26°35′57″E
- Country: Romania
- County: Ialomița

Government
  - Mayor (2020–2024): Vasile Liță (PSD)
- Area: 15.09 km^{2} (5.83 sq mi)
- Elevation: 51 m (167 ft)
- Population (2021-12-01): 7,878
  - Density: 520/km^{2} (1,400/sq mi)
- Time zone: EET/EEST (UTC+2/+3)
- Postal code: 927031
- Area code: +(40) 243
- Vehicle reg.: IL
- Website: www.barbulesti.ro

Bărbulești is a commune located in Ialomița County, Muntenia, Romania. It is composed of a single village, Bărbulești, which was part of Armășești commune until being split off as a separate entity in 2006.

== Geography ==
The commune is situated at the western edge of the Bărăgan Plain, at an altitude of 51 m (167 ft). It is located just west of the city of Urziceni, on the banks of the Sărata River. Bărbulești is crossed by national road DN1D, which connects Urziceni with Ploiești. The Bărbulești halt serves the CFR Main Line 700, which connects Bucharest to Brăila, Galați and the border with Moldova at Giurgiulești, as well as Line 701, which starts in Urziceni and ends in Ploiești.

== Demographics ==
Historical population
Year	Pop.	±%
2002	4,779	—
2011	5,902	+23.5%
2021	7,878	+33.5%
Source: Census data

According to the 2011 census, Bărbulești had a population of 5,902 inhabitants; of those, 79.7% were Roma, 2.64% Romanians, and 17.66% of unknown ethnic origin. At the 2021 census, the population had increased to 7,878, of which 82.51% were Roma and 1.22% Romanians. The inhabitants mostly constitute the Ursari subgroup of the Roma.
