= Rușavăț =

- Location within Romania

Location
- Country: Romania
- Counties: Buzău County

Physical characteristics
- Mouth: Călmățui
  - location: Albești
  - coordinates: 44.9954°N 26.9219°E
- Length: 16 km (9.9 mi)
- Basin size: 81 km^{2} (31 sq mi)

Basin features
- Progression: Călmățui→ Danube→ Black Sea

The Rușavăț is a left tributary of the river Călmățui in Romania. It flows into the Călmățui in Albești. Its length is 16 km (9.9 mi) and its basin size is 81 km^{2} (31 sq mi).
