= Negreasca =

- Location within Romania

Location
- Country: Romania
- Counties: Buzău County

Physical characteristics
- Mouth: Călmățui
  - coordinates: 44.9931°N 26.9290°E
- Length: 20 km (12 mi)
- Basin size: 73 km^{2} (28 sq mi)

Basin features
- Progression: Călmățui→ Danube→ Black Sea

The Negreasca is a left tributary of the river Călmățui in Romania. It flows into the Călmățui in Albești. Its length is 20 km (12 mi) and its basin size is 73 km^{2} (28 sq mi).
