= Great Brăila Island =

Romanian Island on the river Danube

Coordinates: 45°1′18″N 28°2′57″E

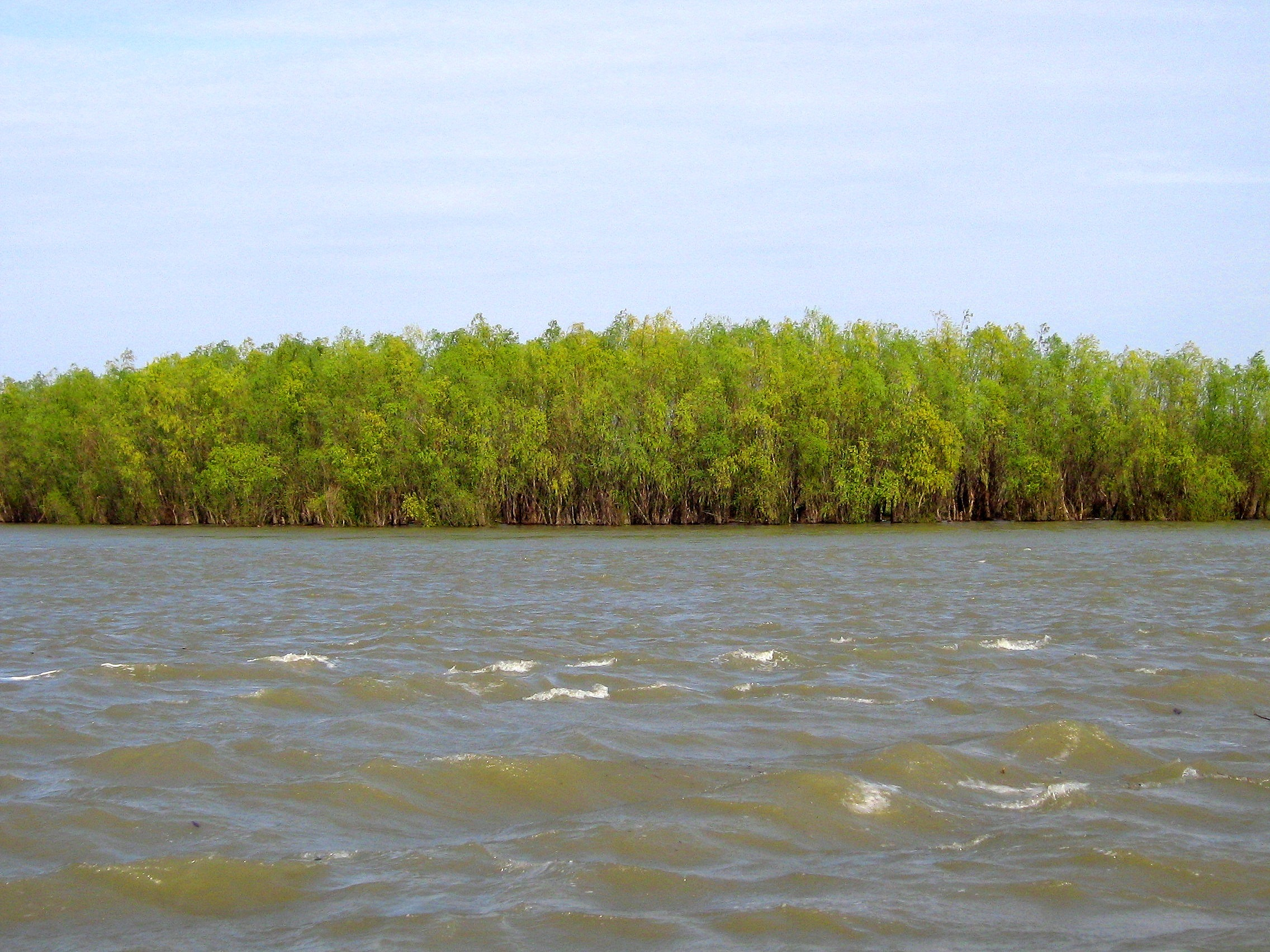

The Great Brăila Island (Romanian: Insula Mare a Brăilei) is an island on the Danube river in the Brăila County, Romania. It has on average 57.9 km (36.0 mi) length and 18.6 km (11.6 mi) width, with a total area of 710 km^{2} (270 sq mi). The two river branches which separate it from the mainland are Măcin Branch and Vâlciu Branch.

Adjacent to the west across the Vâlciu branch is the Small Brăila Island (Romanian: Insula Mică a Brăilei, actually a chain of several islands within swampy area), separated from the mainland by Vâlciu and Cremenea Branch.

Currently, 681.3 km^{2} (263.1 sq mi)—94.6% of the area of island—are occupied by agricultural terrains of which 70.84 km^{2} (27.35 sq mi) are irrigated and is protected by a dam having a length of 23.5 km (14.6 mi). On the island there are two communes, Frecăței and Mărașu, which have about 5,000 inhabitants. In the southwest is the village of Mărașu.

There was a series of swamps – Brăila Swamp (Romanian: Balta Brăilei (Note: The Romanian word "baltă" may be translated as "pond", however the Romanian word has a more generic meaning of expanses of stagnating shallow water. In the context of Brăila the proper term would be "swamp" or "wetland", especially keeping in mind that the whole wetland around the chain of islands called "Small Brăila island" (Insula Mică a Brăilei) is called Balta Mică a Brăilei ("Small Brăila Swamp/Wetland))), until the Communist regime drained them and built dams using forced labour of political detainees and transformed it to an agricultural area. There were "re-education camps" at Grădina, Ostrov, Bandoiu, Lunca, Salcia, Stoienești, and Strâmba Veche. (See Brăila Swamp labor camps.) The terrain proved to be fertile and it was declared a "success of Communism in Romania".

In 2018, it was announced that investor Hamdan Bin Zayed Al Nahyan purchased Agricost SA, the company (i.e Agricost) does not own the land but has leased the 57,000 hectares of agricultural terrains up until 2032.

Balta Mică a Brăilei Natural Park is located on the Small Brăila Island.

== Sources ==
- Tudor, Mihai (July 26, 2005). "Insula Mare – agricultură pe trupuri umane". Ediție Specială (in Romanian). Archived from the original on March 10, 2007.
- Tudor, Mihai (July 26, 2005). "Tuberculoșii, plimbați de la o colonie la alta". Ediție Specială (in Romanian). Archived from the original on March 10, 2007.
- Antoniu, Gabriela (August 4, 2005). "Bărăganul dintre brațele Dunării". Jurnalul Național (in Romanian).

== See also ==
- Cherneva, Toni; Rotariu, Oana. "Reflections on a dark past – the forced labour camps of the Danube Delta" (PDF). www.breiling.org.
