= Găgeni =

Găgeni may refer to several villages in Romania:

- Găgeni, a village in Săhăteni Commune, Buzău County
- Găgeni, a village in Păuleşti Commune, Prahova County
- Găgeni, a village in Lădești Commune, Vâlcea County
