= Pietroasa (Sărata) =

- Location within Romania

Location
- Country: Romania
- Counties: Buzău County
- Villages: Pietroasele

Physical characteristics
- Mouth: Sărata
  - coordinates: 45.0014°N 26.6425°E
- Length: 10 km (6.2 mi)
- Basin size: 54 km^{2} (21 sq mi)

Basin features
- Progression: Sărata→ Ialomița→ Danube→ Black Sea

The Pietroasa is a right tributary of the river Sărata in Romania. It flows into the Sărata near Movila Banului. Its length is 10 km (6.2 mi) and its basin size is 54 km^{2} (21 sq mi).
