= Mărgineanu =

Mărgineanu is a surname. Notable people with the surname include:

- Ion Mărgineanu, Moldovan politician
- Nicolae Mărgineanu (director) (born 1938), Romanian film director and screenwriter
- Nicolae Mărgineanu (psychologist), father of the director

== See also ==
- Mărgineanu, village in Mihăilești, Buzău, Romania
