= Crivăț =

Crivăț, crivetz or krivu (Romanian pronunciation: [ˈkrivət͡s]) is a north-easterly bora wind in Moldavia, Dobruja, and the Bărăgan Plain parts of Romania. It occurs most often in winter, but is also seen in autumn and spring. It blows at speeds of up to 30–35 m/s (108–126 km/h, 67-78 mph), creating blizzard conditions. Also, it can be found in the region of Brasov.
