= I. C. Massim =

Romanian linguist

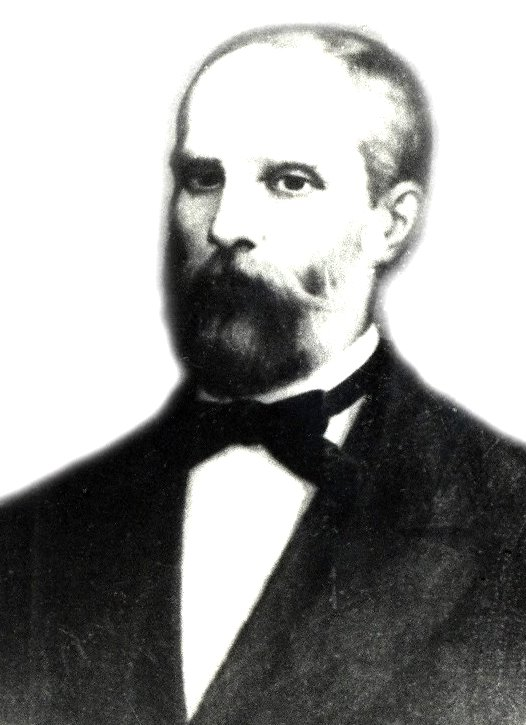
Ion C. Massim

I. C. Massim (or Ioan C. Massimu; 1825–1877) was a Romanian linguist and a founding member of the Romanian Academy. I. C. Massim was born Ion Floricel in the village of Gropeni, near the Danube port of Brăila as the son of a country priest. He changed his name to Maxim, derived from the name of his birthplace, and signed his books as I. C. Massimu. The crowning achievement of Massim's linguistic career was the 1875 publication, together with August Treboniu Laurian, of the first complete dictionary of the Romanian language, a monumental work that included two volumes of words of Latin origin and a comprehensive glossary of words "of foreign, dubious or unknown origin".
