= Gheorghe Bunea Stancu =

Romanian politician

Gheorghe Bunea Stancu (born 24 December 1954 in Stăncuța, Brăila County) is a Romanian politician, member of the Social Democratic Party (PSD). He served as President of the Brăila County Council and President of the football club AFC Dacia Unirea Brăila.
