= August Treboniu Laurian =

Romanian politician, historian and linguist

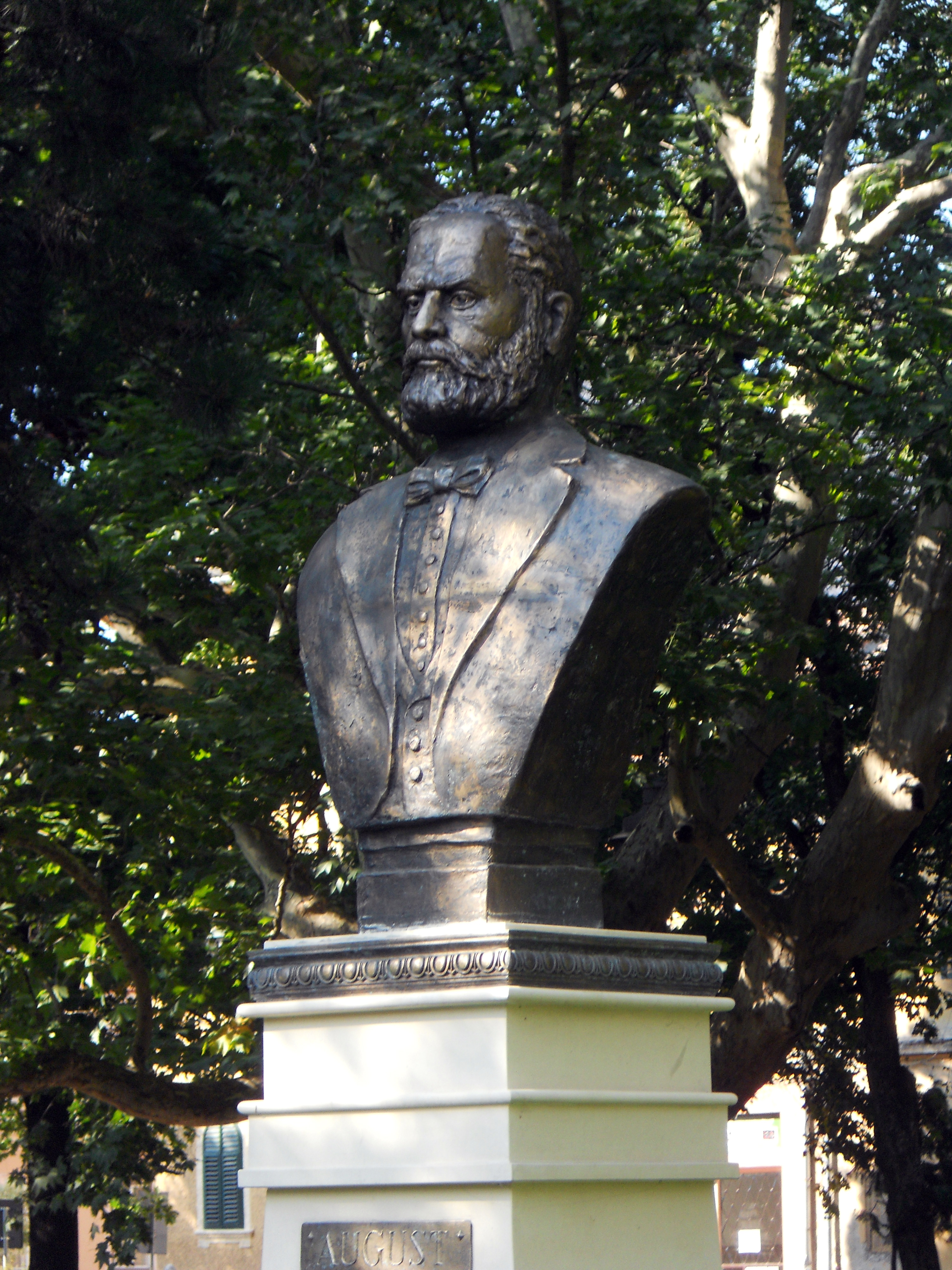
A bust of August Treboniu Laurian

August Treboniu Laurian (Romanian pronunciation: [awˈɡust treˈbonju la.uriˈan]; 17 July 1810 – 25 February 1881) was a Transylvanian Romanian politician, historian and linguist. He was born in the village of Hochfeld, Principality of Transylvania, Austrian Empire (today Fofeldea as part of Nocrich, Romania). He obtained his doctorate at the Göttingen University and was a participant in the 1848 revolution, an organizer of the Romanian school and one of the founding members of the Romanian Academy.

Laurian was a member of the Transylvanian School, a mainly-Transylvanian movement in the Romanian culture which promoted the idea that Romanians are pure Romans, whose history was a continuation of the history of the Roman Empire.

His book on History of the Romanians began with the Foundation of Rome in 753 BC and after the demise of Rome, it continues with the history of the Romanians, with all dates being converted to the Roman system, Ab urbe condita. Thus, in his book it is written that Vladimirescu's rebellion occurred in the year AUC 2574 (1821 CE).

Because of this alleged continuity, he supported the purification of the Romanian language by stripping it of non-Latin elements and attempting to bring it as close to Latin as possible. Between 1871 and 1876, Laurian collaborated with Ioan Massim for a two-volume Romanian language dictionary, commissioned by the Romanian Academy. The dictionary was stripped of non-Latin words, including neologisms as replacements for such words, which were supposed to be eliminated from the language. The dictionary was also written in an etymological spelling system, the result being an artificial language which only vaguely resembled Romanian and it provoked laughter, discrediting the Latinist school.

== See also ==
- Wallachian Revolution of 1848
- Nicolae Bălcescu
- Mihail Kogălniceanu

== Gallery ==
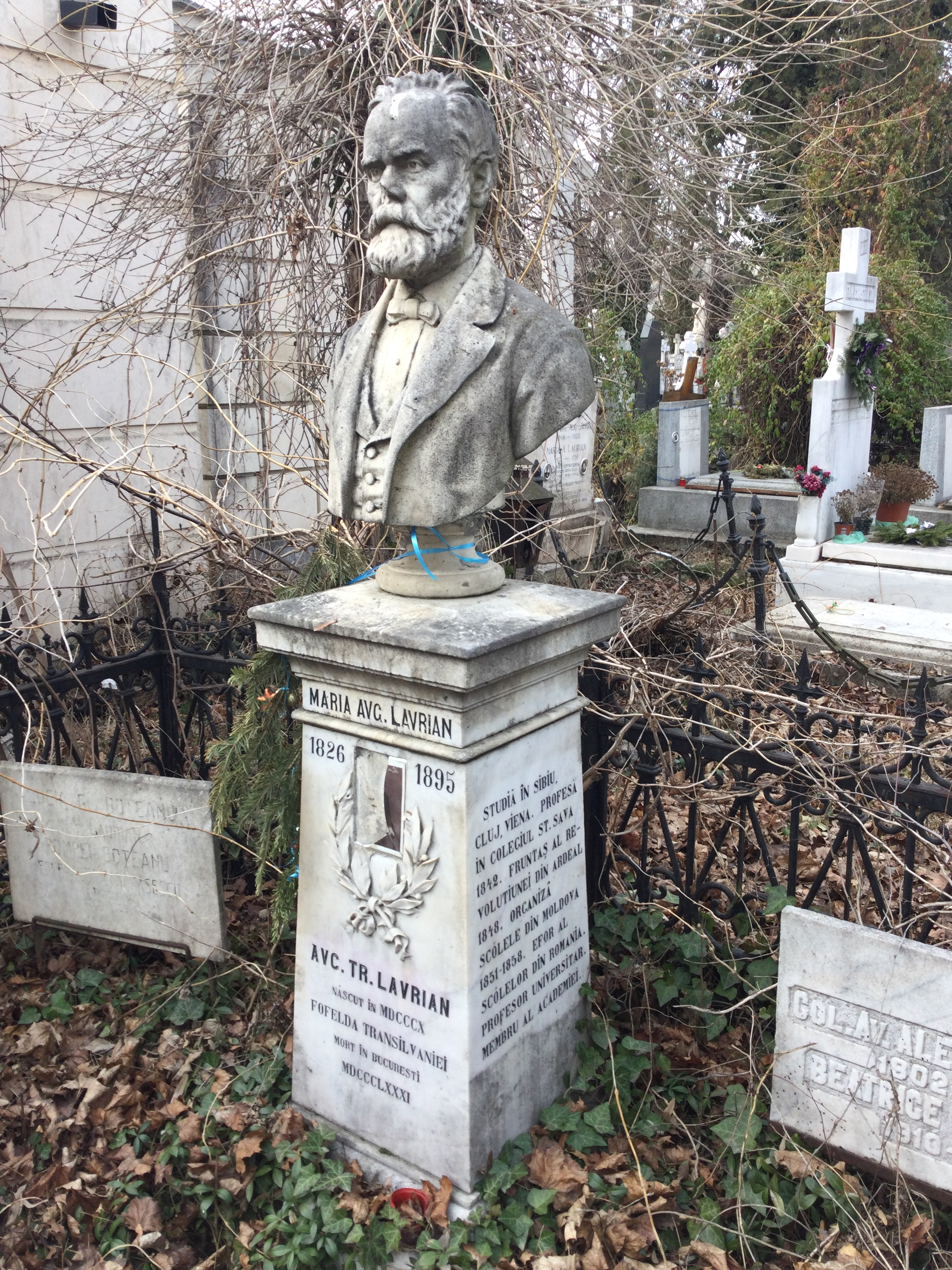
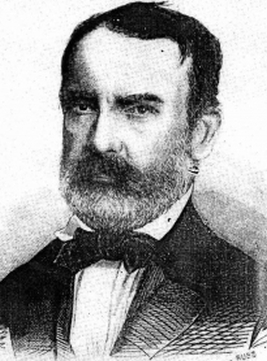
