= Toți =

- Location within Romania

Location
- Country: Romania
- Counties: Ialomița County
- Villages: Sălciile, Slătioarele, Jilavele

Physical characteristics
- Mouth: Sărata
  - location: Nenișori
  - coordinates: 44.7616°N 26.5622°E

Basin features
- Progression: Sărata→ Ialomița→ Danube→ Black Sea

The Toți is a right tributary of the river Sărata in Romania. It discharges into the Sărata near Nenișori. It flows through the villages Sălciile, Slătioarele and Jilavele. Its length is 21 km (13 mi) and its basin size is 69 km^{2} (27 sq mi). The Toți flows through the Jilavele reservoir.
