= Balta Mică a Brăilei Natural Park =

Nature reserve in Brăila County, Romania

- Parcul Natural Balta Mică a Brăilei
- IUCN category V (protected landscape/seascape)
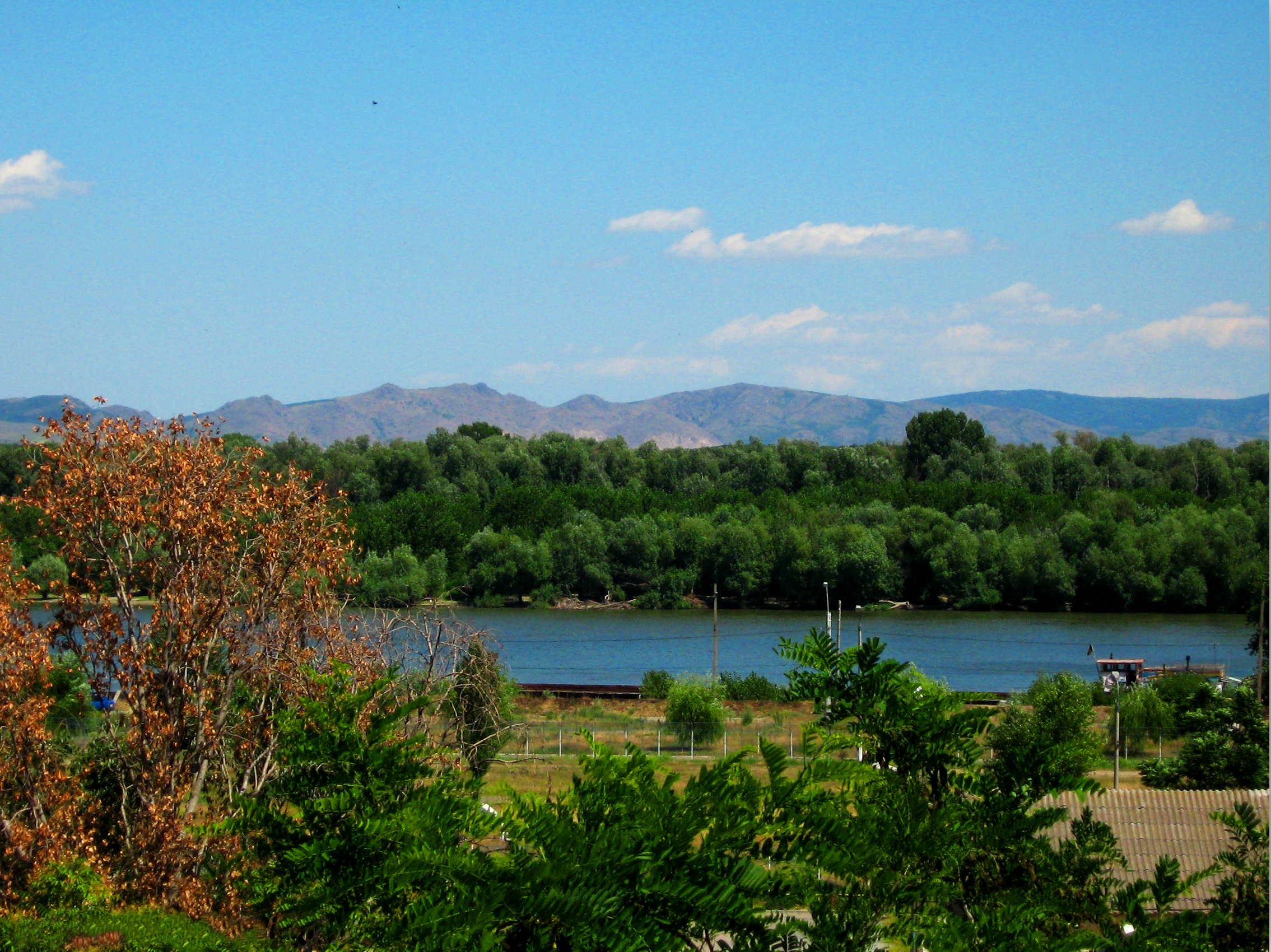
- Danube at Brăila

- Location within Romania
- Location: Romania; Brăila County
- Nearest city: Brăila
- Coordinates: 44.944°N 27.906°E
- Area: 17.529 hectares (43.32 acres)
- Established: 2000, designation in 1978
- Website: www.bmb.ro

The Balta Mică a Brăilei Natural Park (Romanian: Parcul Natural Balta Mică a Brăilei) is a protected area (natural park category V IUCN) which is situated in Romania, in Brăila County, on the administrative territory of communes Berteștii de Jos, Chiscani, Gropeni, Mărașu and Stăncuța.

== Location ==
The Natural Park is located in the inferior course of the Danube, between the Brăila Plain (Wallachian Plain) and Great Brăila Island, based on the Small Brăila Island, in the south-eastern part of country.

== Description ==
Balta Mică a Brăilei Natural Park an area of 17.529 ha was declared protected area by the Law Number 5 of March 6, 2000 (published in Romanian Official Paper Number 152 of March 12, 2000) and is a wetland of international importance especially a waterfowl habitat (aquatic ecosystem) and terrestrial species.

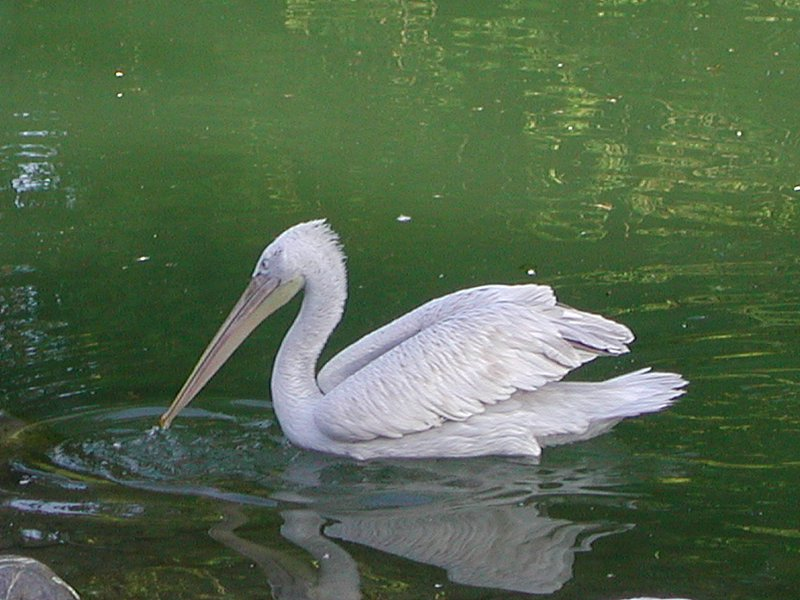
Pelecanus crispus

== Fauna ==
Species of fish: Black Sea shad (Alosa pontica), northern pike (Esox lucius), zander (Stizostedion lucioperca), wels catfish (Silurus glanis) or common carp (Cyprinus carpio).

Species of birds: red-breasted goose (Branta ruficollis), Dalmatian pelican (Pelecanus criptus), purple heron (Ardea purpurea), pygmy cormorant (Phalacrocorax pygmeus), squacco heron (Ardeola ralloides), black stork (Ciconia nigra), ferruginous duck (Aythya nyroca), whooper swan (Cygnus cygnus).

== Access ==
- European route E60 București – Moviliţa – Urziceni – National road DN2A Slobozia – Țăndărei – Giurgeni – bridge Giurgeni-Vadu Oii
