= Călmățui (Siret) =

- Location within Romania

Location
- Country: Romania
- Counties: Galați County
- Villages: Grivița, Călmățui

Physical characteristics
- Mouth: Siret
  - coordinates: 45°33′10″N 27°36′56″E
- Length: 25 km (16 mi)
- Basin size: 363 km^{2} (140 sq mi)

Basin features
- Progression: Siret→ Danube→ Black Sea
- Tributaries
  - right: Herătău, Valea Ciorii

The Călmățui is a left tributary of the river Siret in Romania. It discharges into the Siret near the village Tudor Vladimirescu. The basin size of the 25 km (16 mi) long Călmățui is 363 km^{2} (140 sq mi).
