= Stăncuța =

- Commune
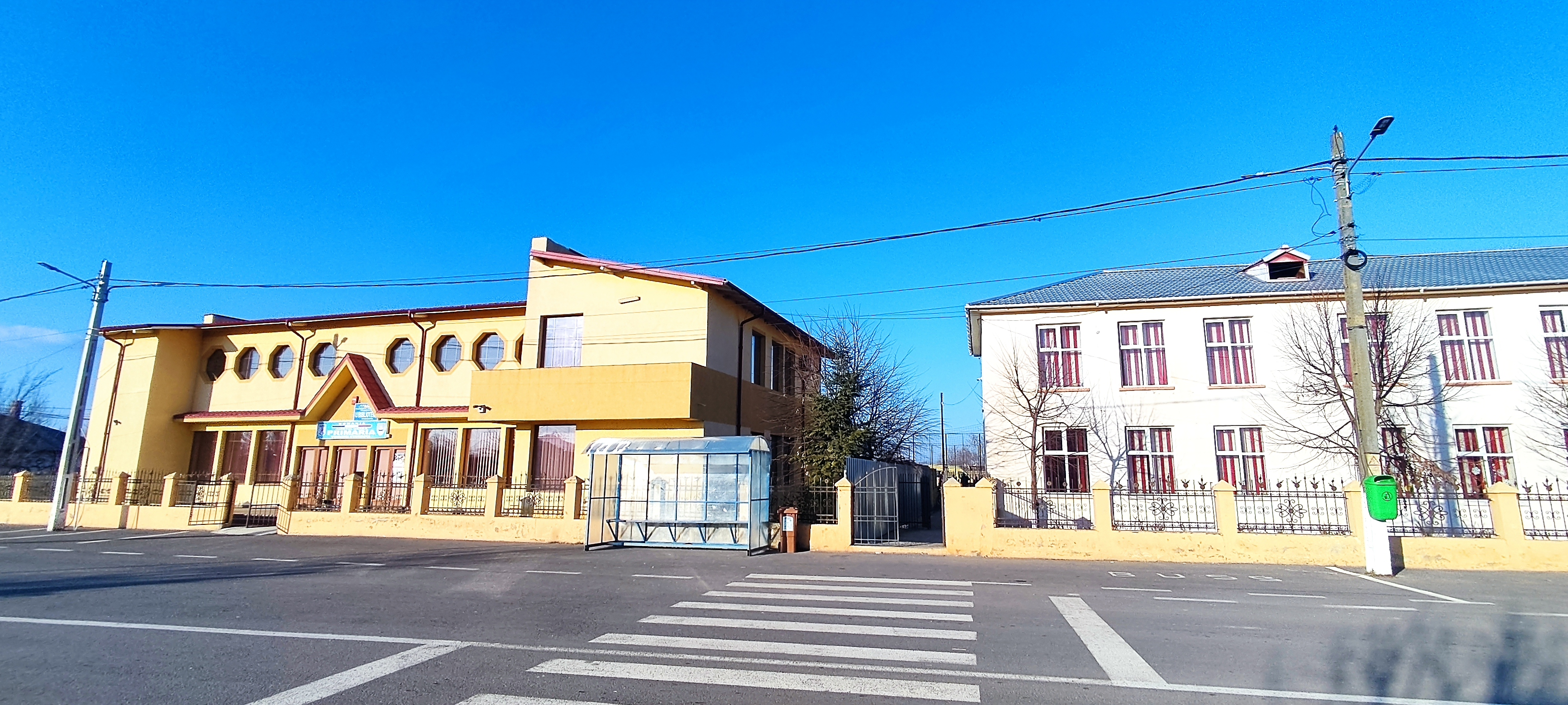
- Library and school in Stăncuța

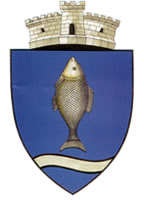
- Coat of arms

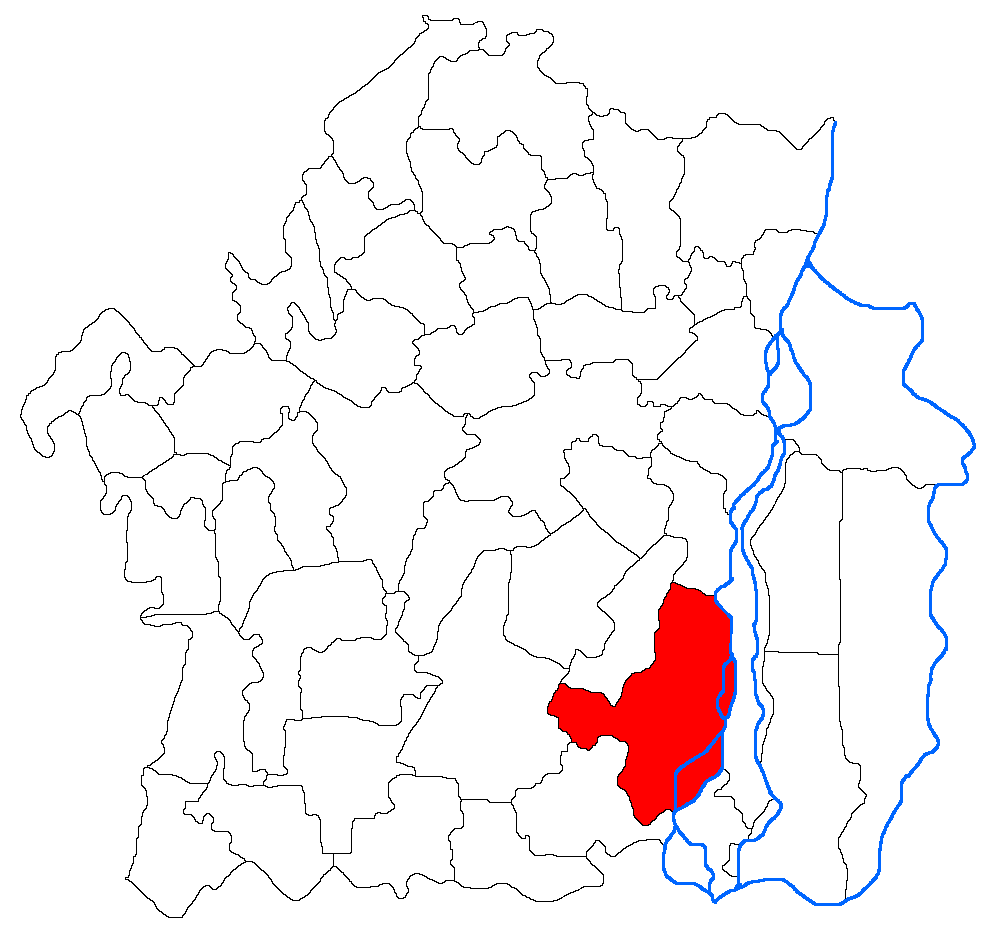
- Location in Brăila County

- Location in Romania
- Coordinates: 44°54′N 27°50′E
- Country: Romania
- County: Brăila

Government
  - Mayor (2024–2028): Nicu Turcu (PSD)
- Area: 261.99 km^{2} (101.15 sq mi)
- Elevation: 7 m (23 ft)
- Population (2021-12-01): 2,950
  - Density: 11.3/km^{2} (29.2/sq mi)
- Time zone: UTC+02:00 (EET)
  - Summer (DST): UTC+03:00 (EEST)
- Postal code: 817150
- Area code: +(40) 239
- Vehicle reg.: BR
- Website: stancuta.ro

Stăncuța is a commune located in Brăila County, Muntenia, Romania. It is composed of four villages: Cuza Vodă, Polizești, Stanca, and Stăncuța.

The Balta Mică a Brăilei Natural Park is partly situated on the administrative territory of the commune.

== Natives ==
- Gheorghe Bunea Stancu (born 1954), politician
