= Gropeni =

- Commune
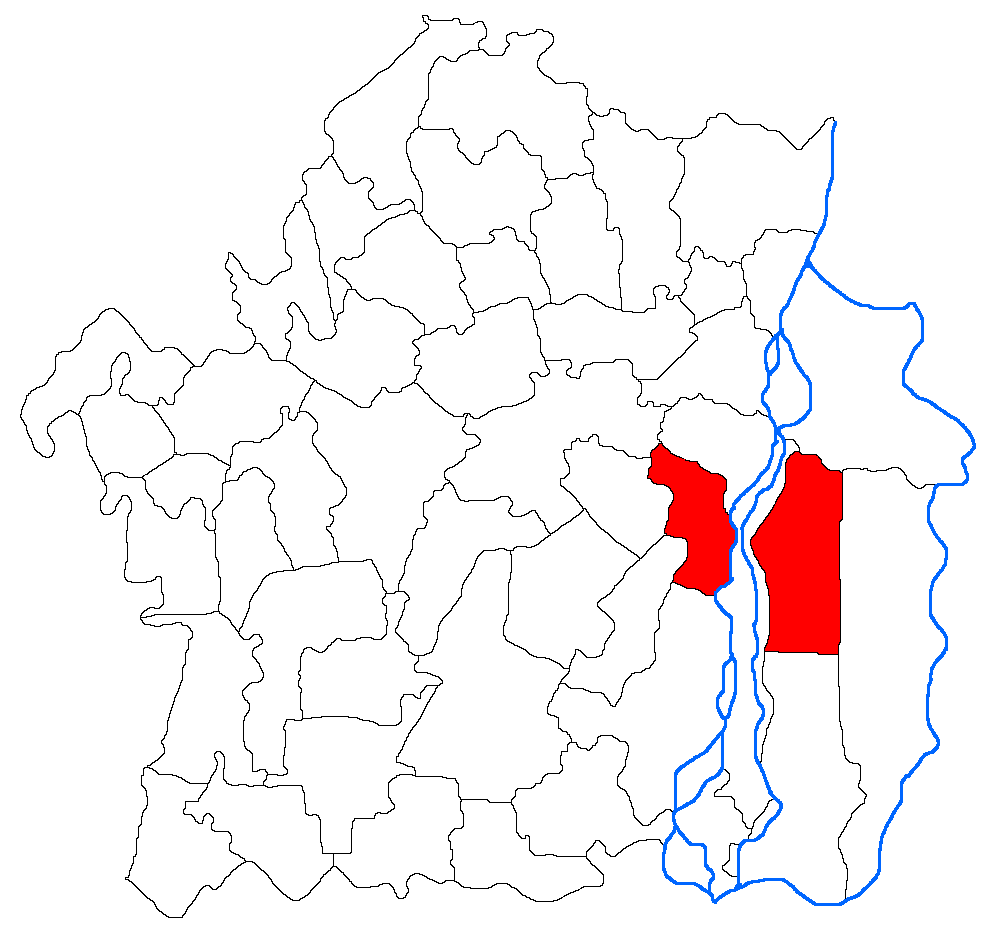
- Location in Brăila County

- Location in Romania
- Coordinates: 45°04′N 27°53′E
- Country: Romania
- County: Brăila
- Population (2021-12-01): 3,022
- Time zone: EET/EEST (UTC+2/+3)
- Vehicle reg.: BR

Gropeni is a commune located in Brăila County, Muntenia, Romania. It is composed of a single village, Gropeni.

The Balta Mică a Brăilei Natural Park is partly situated on the administrative territory of the commune.

== Natives ==
- I. C. Massim
