= Călmățui, Hîncești =

Călmățui
- Village
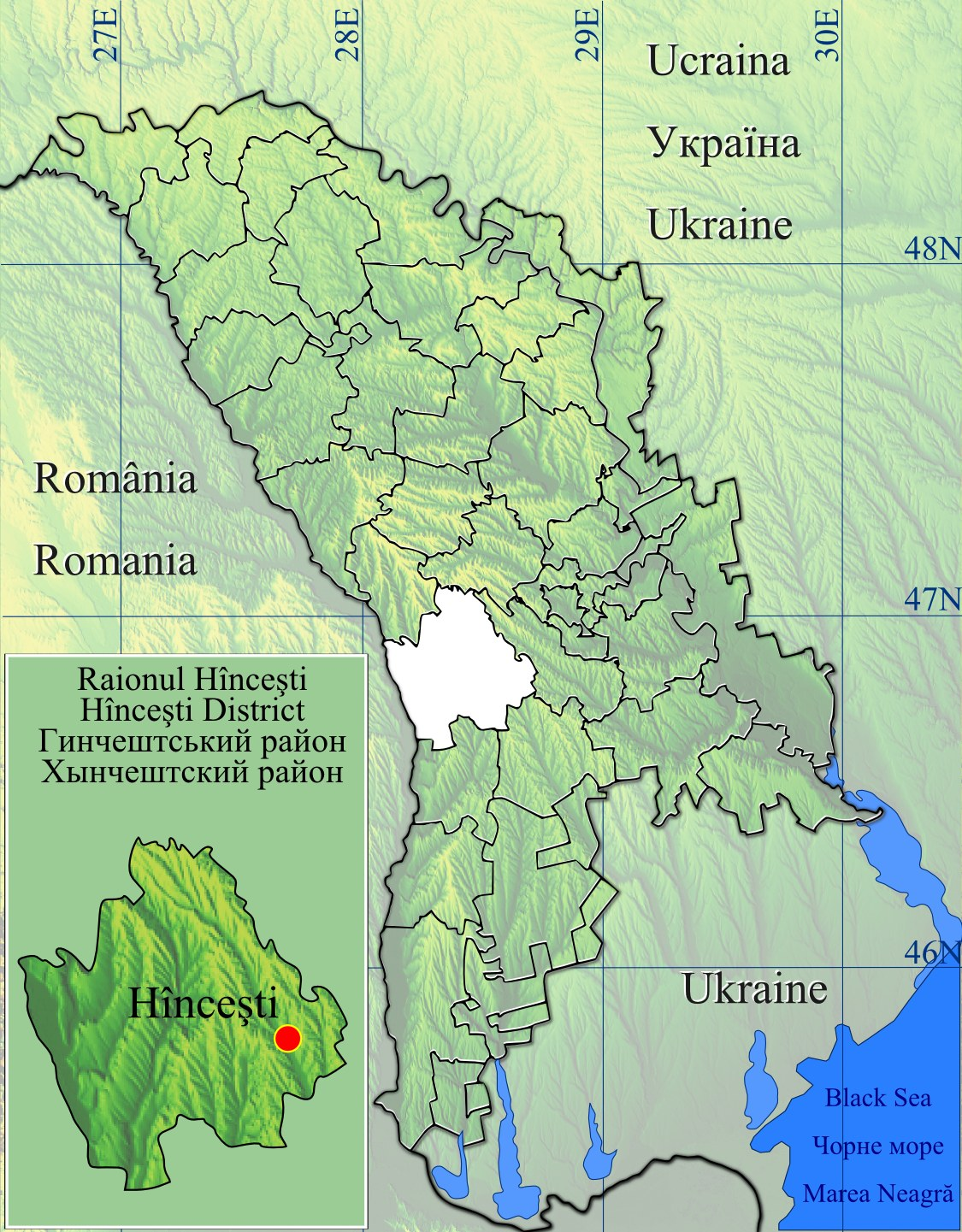
- Location within Hîncești
- Coordinates: 46°46′58″N 28°13′25″E
- Country: Moldova

Government
  - Mayor: Constantin Sandu (PDM)

Population (2014 census)
  - Total: 1,604
- Time zone: UTC+2 (EET)
  - Summer (DST): UTC+3 (EEST)
- Postal code: MD-3418

Călmățui is a village in Hîncești District, Moldova.
