= Berteștii de Jos =

- Commune
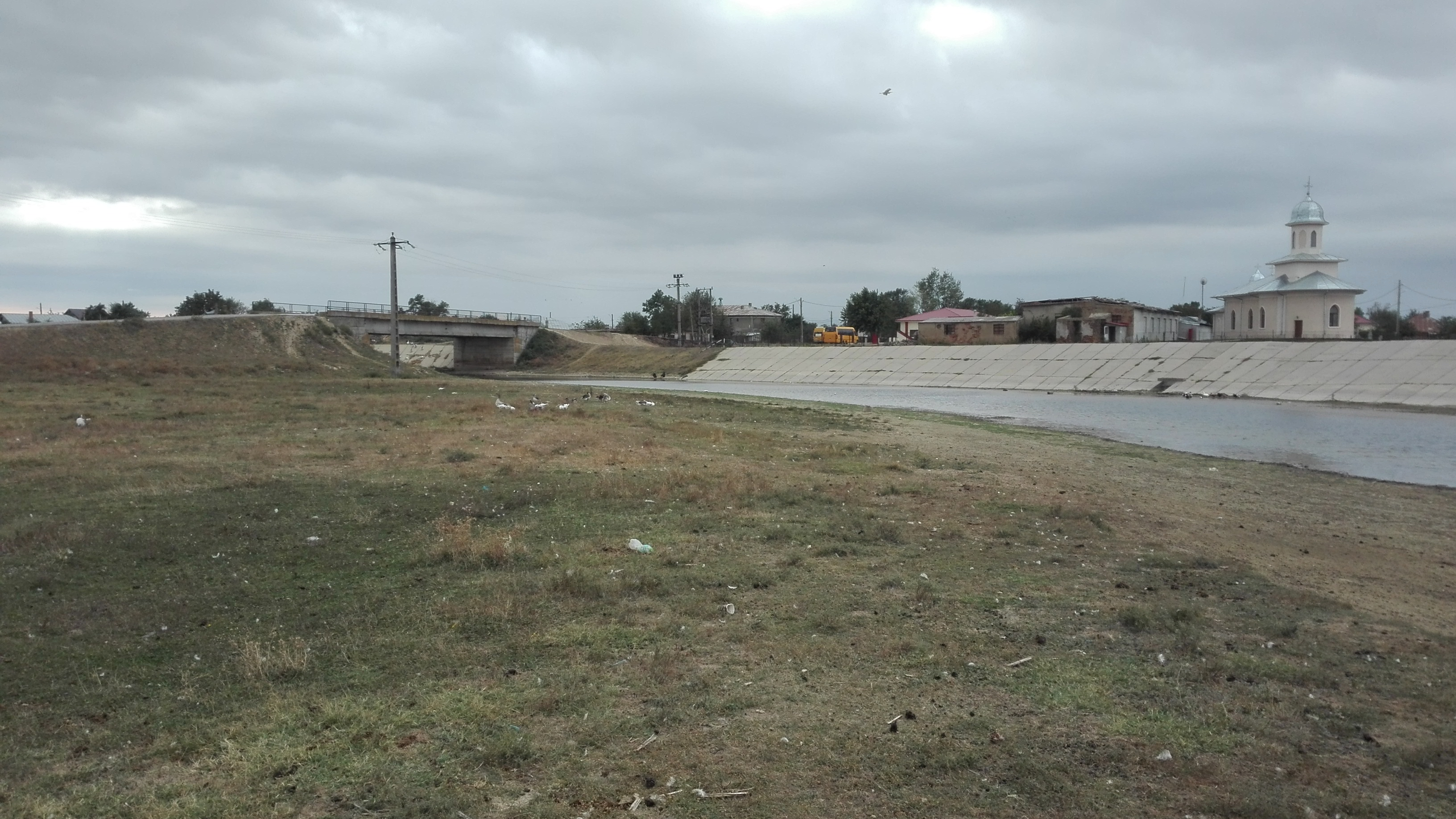
- Berteștii de Jos and the river Călmățui

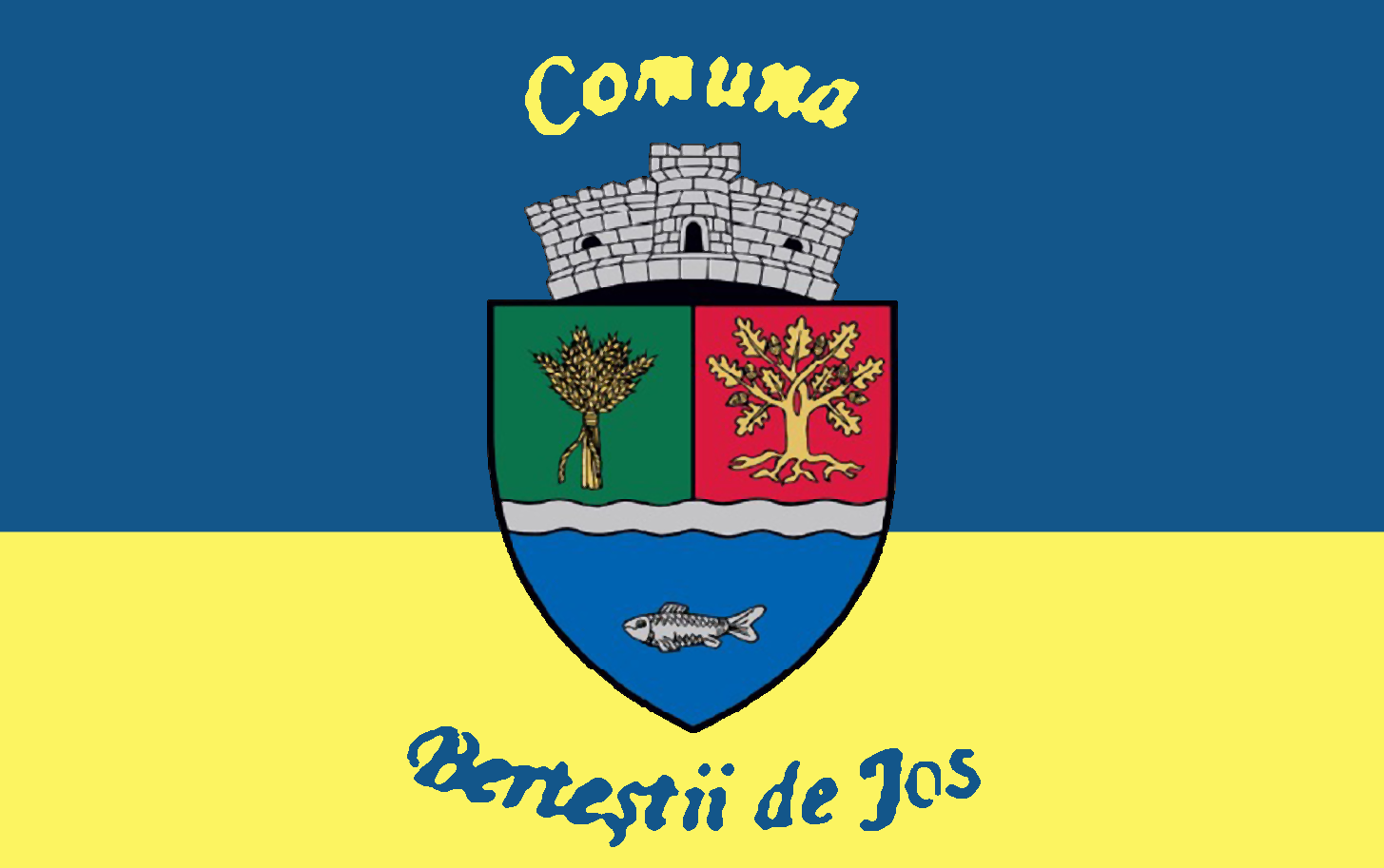
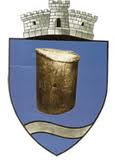
- Flag Coat of arms

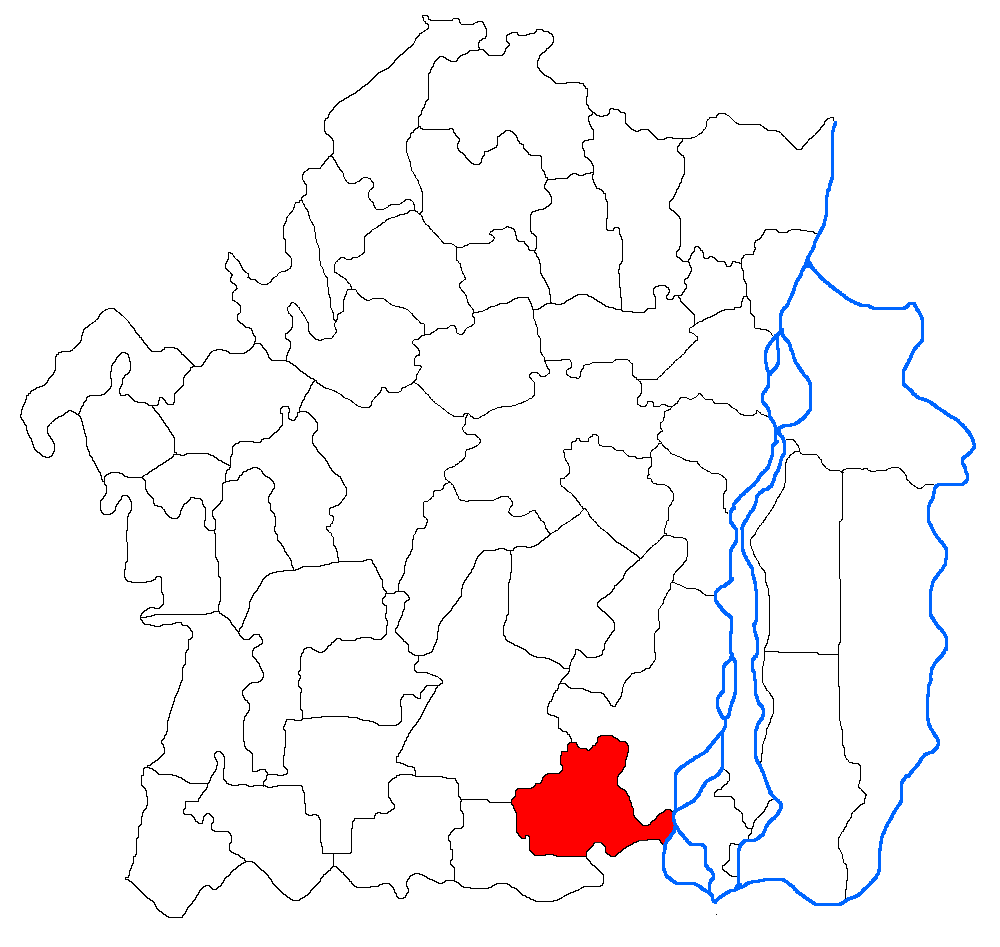
- Location in Brăila County

- Location in Romania
- Coordinates: 44°50′N 27°45′E
- Country: Romania
- County: Brăila

Government
  - Mayor (2020–2024): Costel Florinel Capbun (PNL)
- Area: 135.09 km^{2} (52.16 sq mi)
- Elevation: 8 m (26 ft)
- Population (2021-12-01): 2,929
  - Density: 21.68/km^{2} (56.16/sq mi)
- Time zone: UTC+02:00 (EET)
  - Summer (DST): UTC+03:00 (EEST)
- Postal code: 817010
- Area code: +40 x39
- Vehicle reg.: BR
- Website: www.bertestiidejos.ro

Berteștii de Jos is a commune located in Brăila County, Muntenia, Romania. It is composed of four villages: Berteștii de Jos, Berteștii de Sus, Gura Călmățui and Spiru Haret. It formerly included Gura Gârluței and Nicolești villages, now depopulated.

The Balta Mică a Brăilei Natural Park is partly situated on the administrative territory of the commune.
