= Mărașu =

- Commune
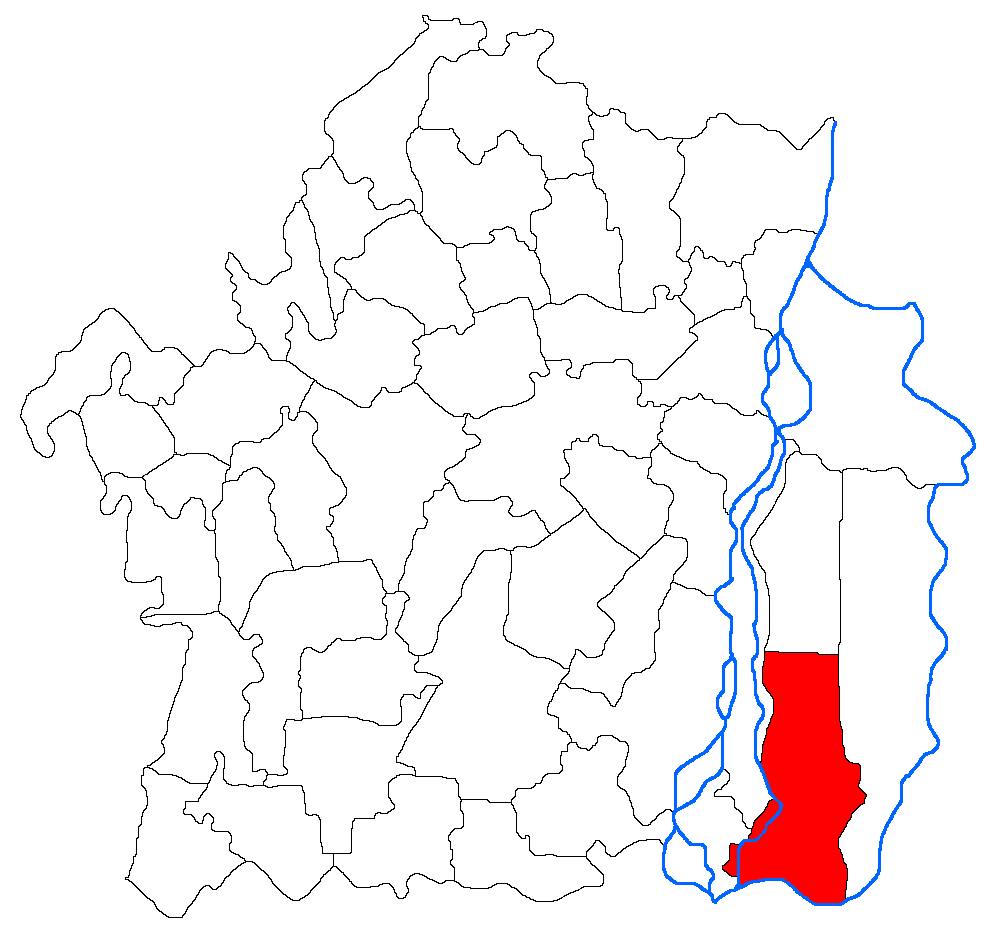
- Location in Brăila County

- Location in Romania
- Coordinates: 44°51′N 27°58′E
- Country: Romania
- County: Brăila
- Population (2021-12-01): 2,236
- Time zone: EET/EEST (UTC+2/+3)
- Vehicle reg.: BR

Mărașu is a commune located in Brăila County, Muntenia, Romania. It is composed of five villages: Băndoiu, Măgureni, Mărașu, Plopi and Țăcău. It formerly included Nedelcu village, now depopulated.

The Balta Mică a Brăilei Natural Park is partly situated on the administrative territory of the commune.
