= Săhăteni =

- Commune
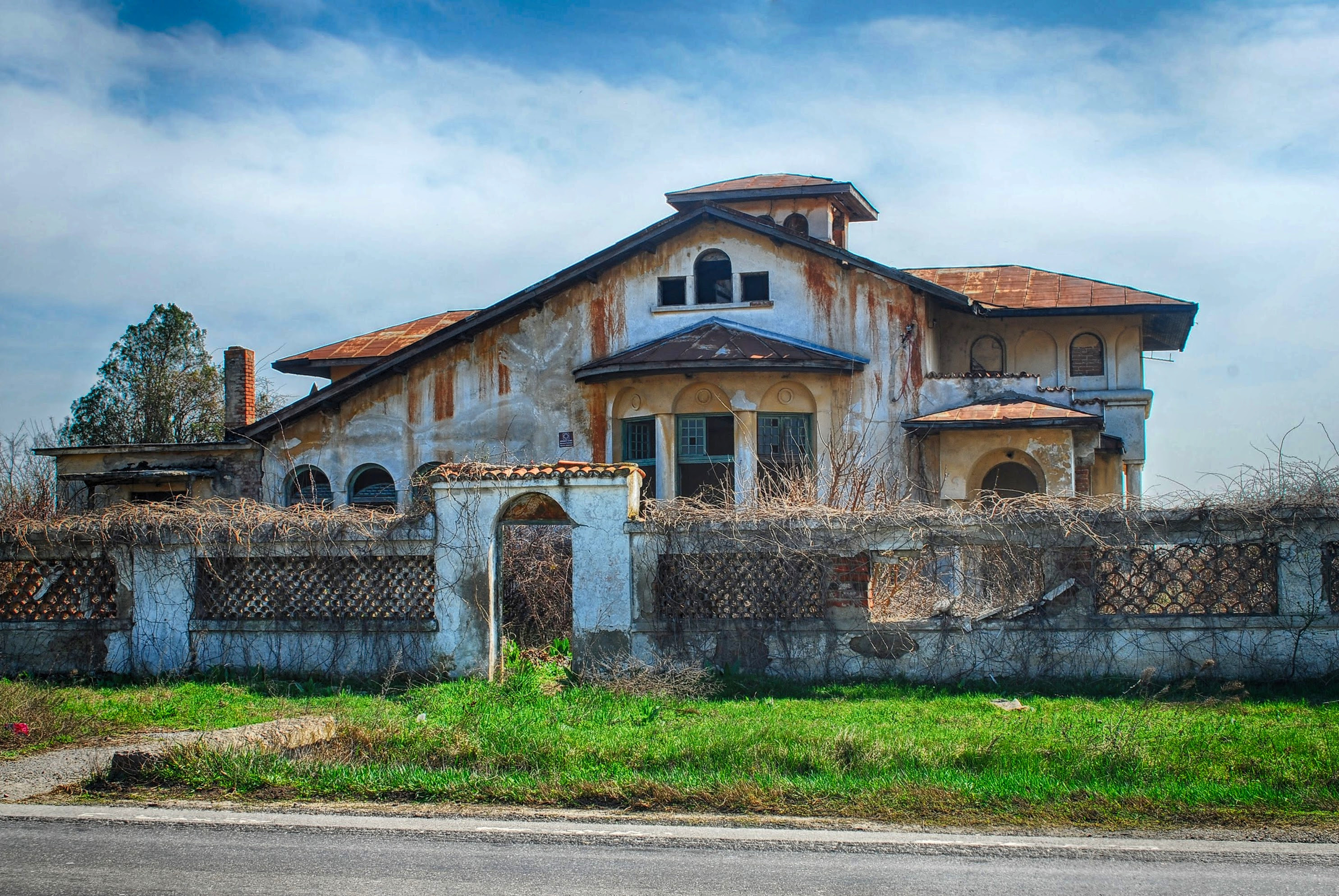
- Hariton mansion in Săhăteni

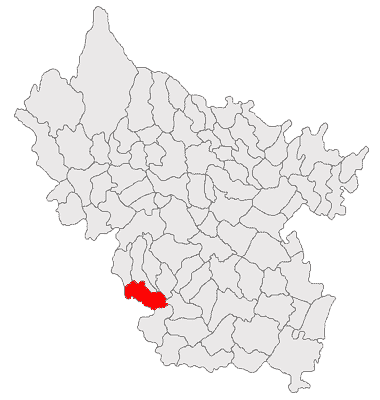
- Location in Buzău County

- Location in Romania
- Coordinates: 45°2′N 26°31′E
- Country: Romania
- County: Buzău
- Subdivisions: Găgeni, Istrița de Jos, Săhăteni, Vintileanca

Government
  - Mayor (2020–2024): Marius Alexandru (PSD)
- Area: 70.47 km^{2} (27.21 sq mi)
- Elevation: 124 m (407 ft)
- Highest elevation: 152 m (499 ft)
- Lowest elevation: 68 m (223 ft)
- Population (2021-12-01): 2,835
  - Density: 40.23/km^{2} (104.2/sq mi)
- Time zone: UTC+02:00 (EET)
  - Summer (DST): UTC+03:00 (EEST)
- Postal code: 127535
- Area code: +(40) 238
- Vehicle reg.: BZ
- Website: www.comunasahateni.ro

Săhăteni is a commune in Buzău County, Muntenia, Romania. It is composed of four villages: Găgeni, Istrița de Jos, Săhăteni, and Vintileanca.

It is known for its vineyards, being located in the Dealu Mare hills region, close to Pietroasele and Valea Călugărească.

Historical population
Year	Pop.	±%
2002	3,376	—
2011	3,248	−3.8%
2021	2,835	−12.7%
Source: Census data
