= Bărăgan Plain =

Region of southeastern Romania

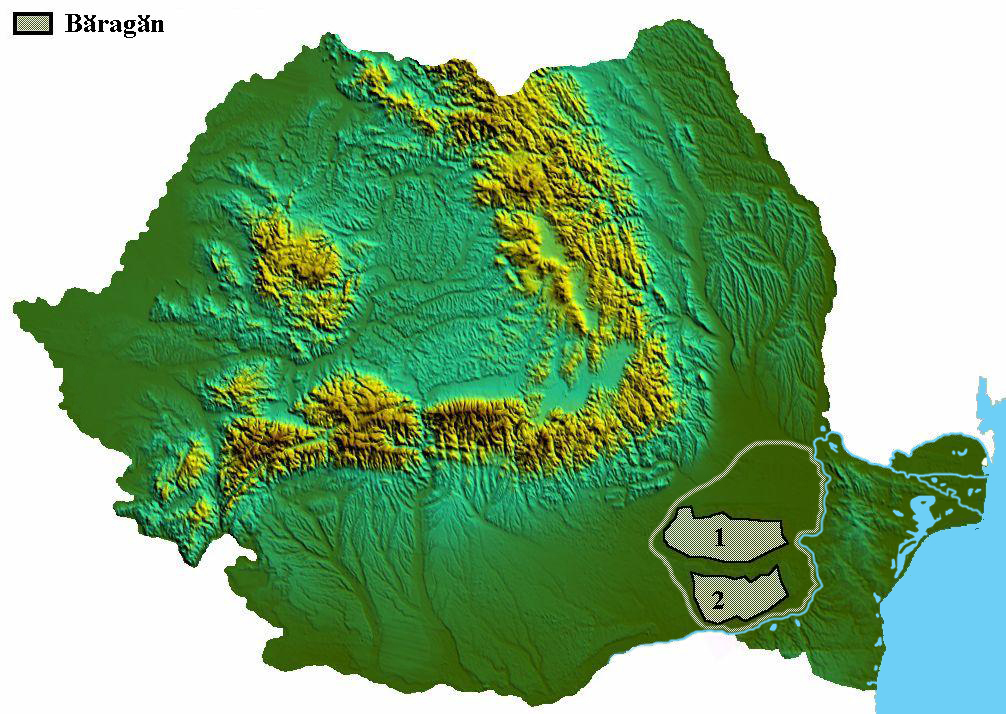
The Bărăgan Plain within Romania (1) Bărăganul Călmățuiului (2) Bărăganul Ialomiței

The Bărăgan Plain (Romanian: Câmpia Bărăganului [kɨmˈpi.a bərəˈɡanuluj]) is a steppe plain in south-eastern Romania. It makes up much of the eastern part of the Wallachian Plain. The region is known for its black soil and a rich humus, and is mostly a cereal-growing area.

It is bounded on the south and east by the Danube, and in the North by the Buzău and Călmățui rivers, both tributaries of the Danube. The western limit is a line joining the cities of Buzău, Urziceni, Budești, and Oltenița. The plain practically covers Ialomița and Călărași counties, extending into the southern portion of Buzău and Brăila counties.

The city of Bucharest is not part of Bărăgan but is on the Vlăsiei Plain.

== Major urban centers ==
- Brăila – 180,302 (2011)
- Călărași – 65,181 (2011)
- Slobozia – 48,241 (2011)
- Fetești – 30,217 (2011)

The cities of Buzău, Urziceni, and Oltenița border the Plains, but are not considered part of the Plains proper.

== History ==
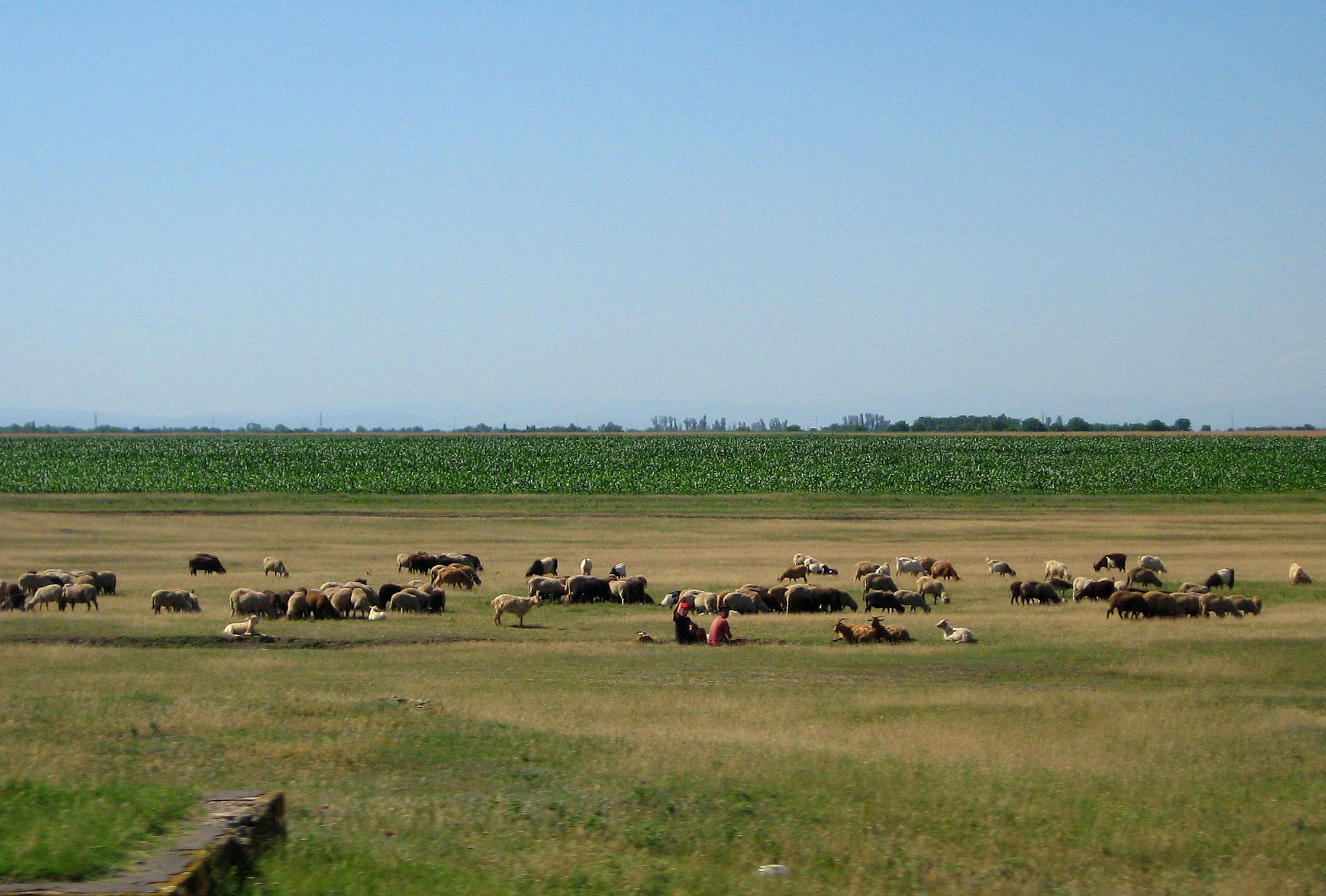
Cattle grazing

Due to lack of forest in the past, the Bărăgan was an important route for the migratory peoples who roamed the area that is south-eastern Romania today. The Bărăgan Steppe was traditionally used as pasture by the shepherds in the Carpathian Mountains (including Transylvania) during transhumance, but was converted to arable land in the second half of the 19th century.

It was used as a depot for mass deportations by the Communist authorities during the 1950s. About 40,000 political prisoners, including Banat Swabians, were relocated here from the west of the country.

== Climate ==
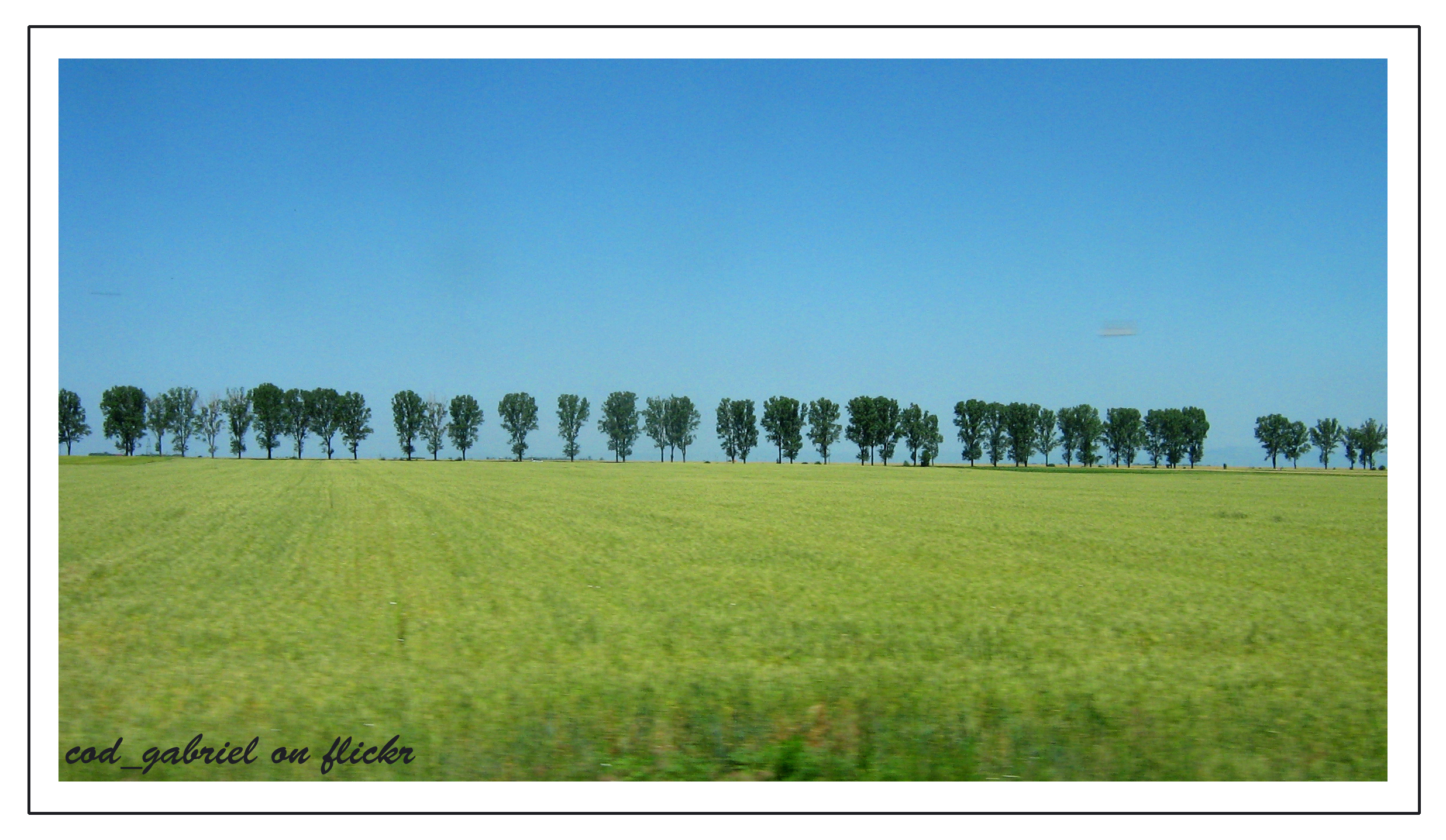
Field

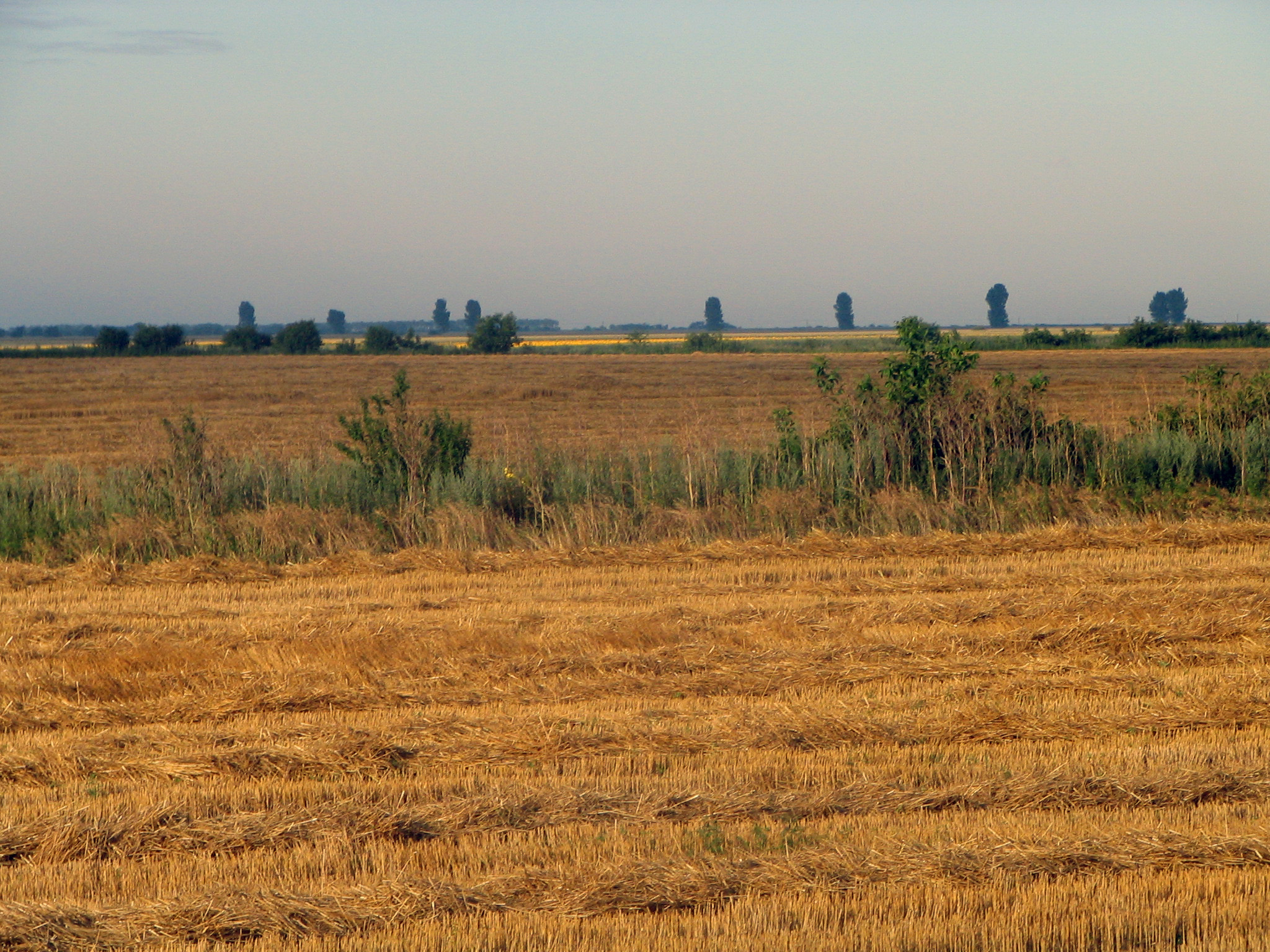
Field in Călărași County

The Bărăgan Plain has a harsh climate with hot and dry summers and includes the location where the highest-ever temperature in Romania was recorded: 44.5 °C (112.1 °F), at Ion Sion, in August 1951. Winters are cold, and subject to the effects of a blizzard wind, known as "crivăț" (this feature also gives the plain its name, derived from the Cuman language for "place where the blizzard is raging").

Due to its climate, it is one of the most inhospitable areas in Romania.

In his novel, Ciulinii Bărăganului, the Romanian writer Panait Istrati describes the Bărăgan Plain as follows:

No trees grow here, and it's so far from one water well to the next that you can die of thirst half-way. The inhabitant of Bărăgan constantly hopes that one day someone will come and teach him how to live better in the Bărăgan, in this dreadful wilderness where water is hidden in the deepest bowels of the earth and where nothing grows except thistles. They cover the land in less than a week. It's the only thing the Bărăgan will tolerate, except for the sheep who lust after these thistles and devour them greedily. Come winter, the shepherd abandons this God forsaken land and returns home. Then the Bărăgan dons its white fur coat and lays to rest for six months. Nothing lives here any more. That's the Bărăgan.
