= Căile Ferate Române Line 700 =

Main railway line in Romania

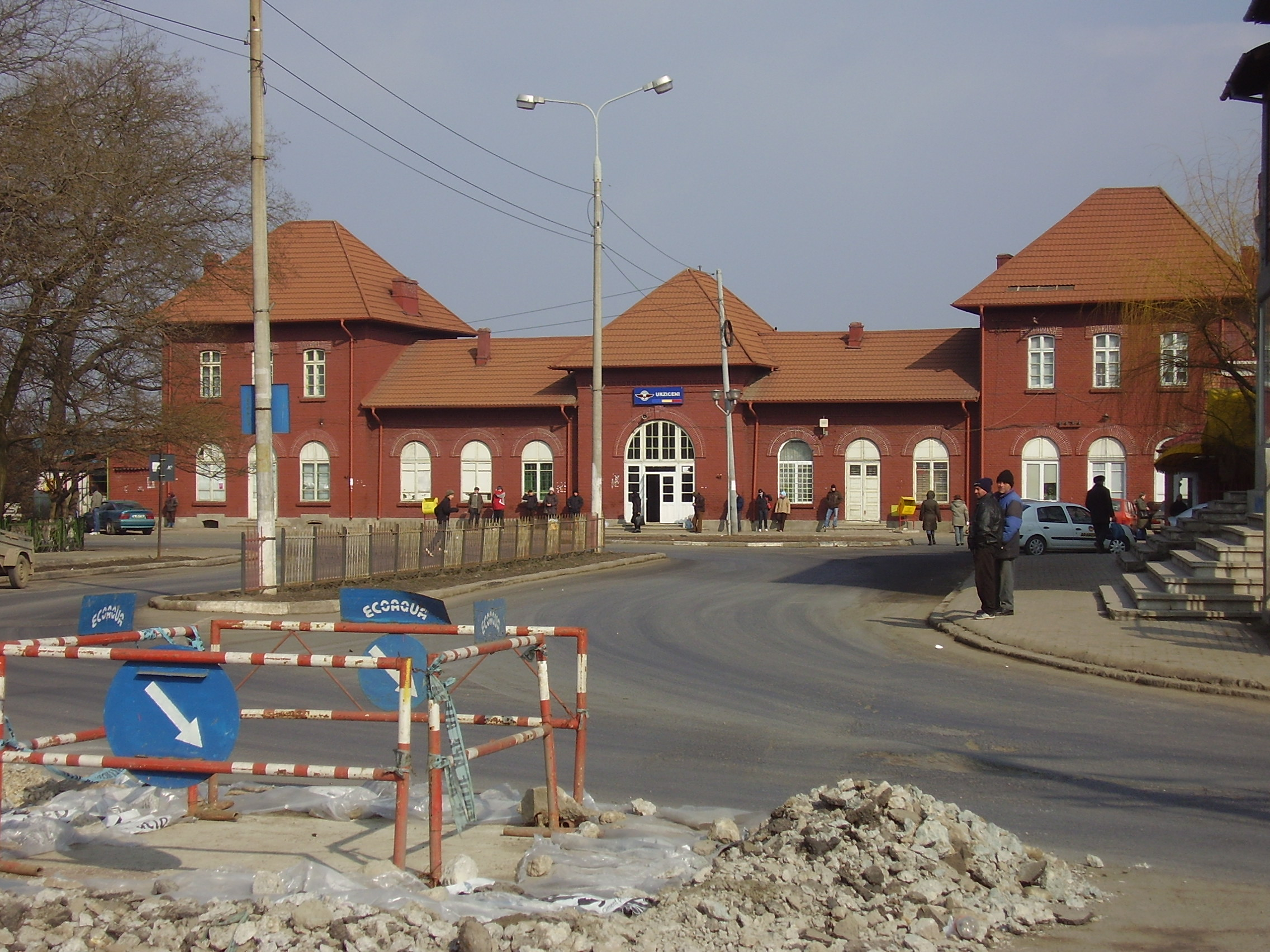
- Urziceni railway station

Overview
- Owner: Romanian State
- Locale: Brăila, Buzău, Galați, Ialomița, Vaslui, Vrancea
- Stations: 16

Service
- Operator(s): Căile Ferate Române

Technical
- Track gauge: 1,435 mm (4 ft 8 1/2 in) standard gauge
Route map

Line 700 is one of CFR's main lines in Romania having a total length of 229 km (142 mi). The main line, connecting Bucharest with the Moldovan border at Giurgiulești, passes through the important cities of Urziceni, Făurei, Brăila and Galați.

== Secondary lines ==
Line	Terminal stations		Intermediate stops	Length (km)
701	Ploiești South	Țăndărei	Urziceni - Slobozia	146
702	Buzău	Fetești	Făurei - Țăndărei	129
703	Galați	Bârlad		107
704	Mărășești	Galați	Tecuci - Barboși	104
