= Grivița, Galați =

Grivița
- Commune
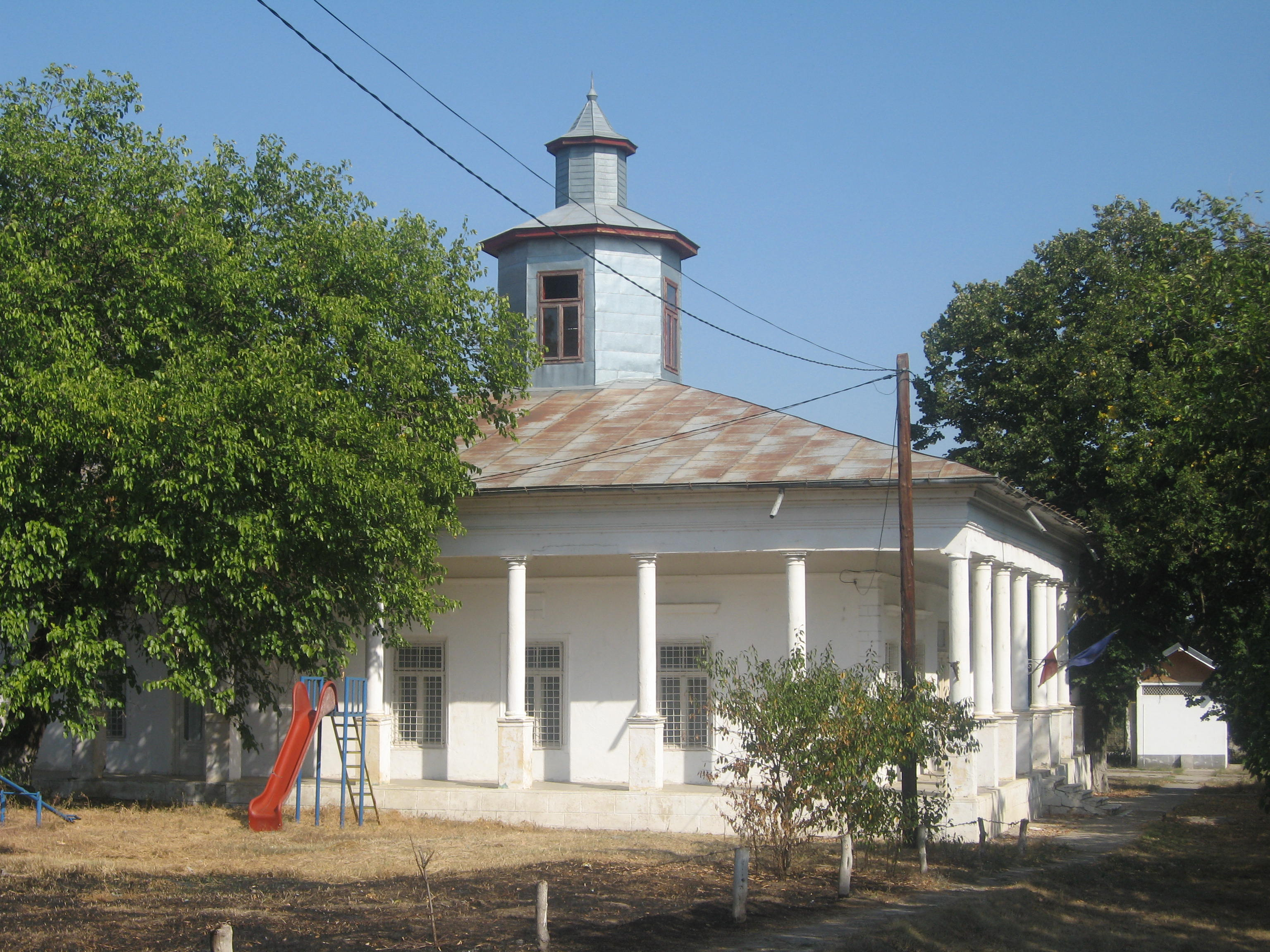
- Tache Anastasiu mansion in Călmățui

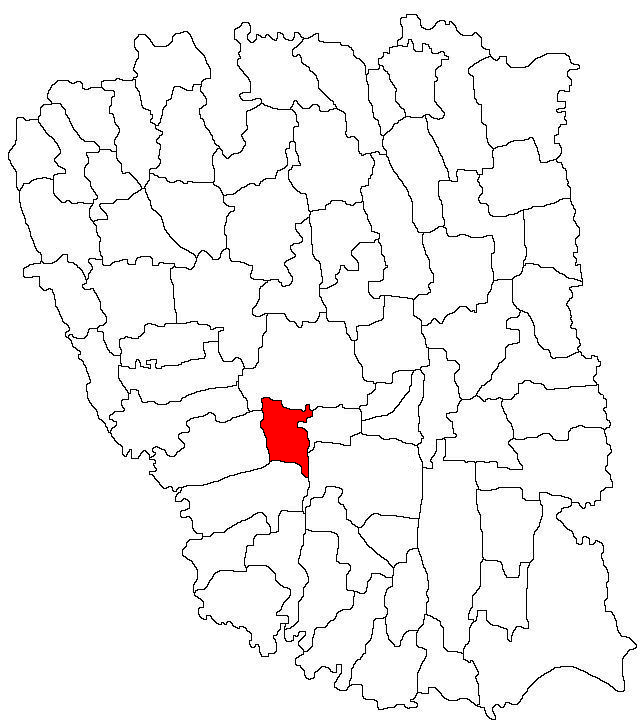
- Location in Galați County

- Location in Romania
- Coordinates: 45°43′N 27°39′E
- Country: Romania
- County: Galați
- Population (2021-12-01): 3,293
- Time zone: UTC+02:00 (EET)
  - Summer (DST): UTC+03:00 (EEST)
- Vehicle reg.: GL

Grivița is a commune in Galați County, Western Moldavia, Romania with a population of 3,665 people. It is composed of two villages, Călmățui and Grivița.
