= Călmățui (Brăila) =

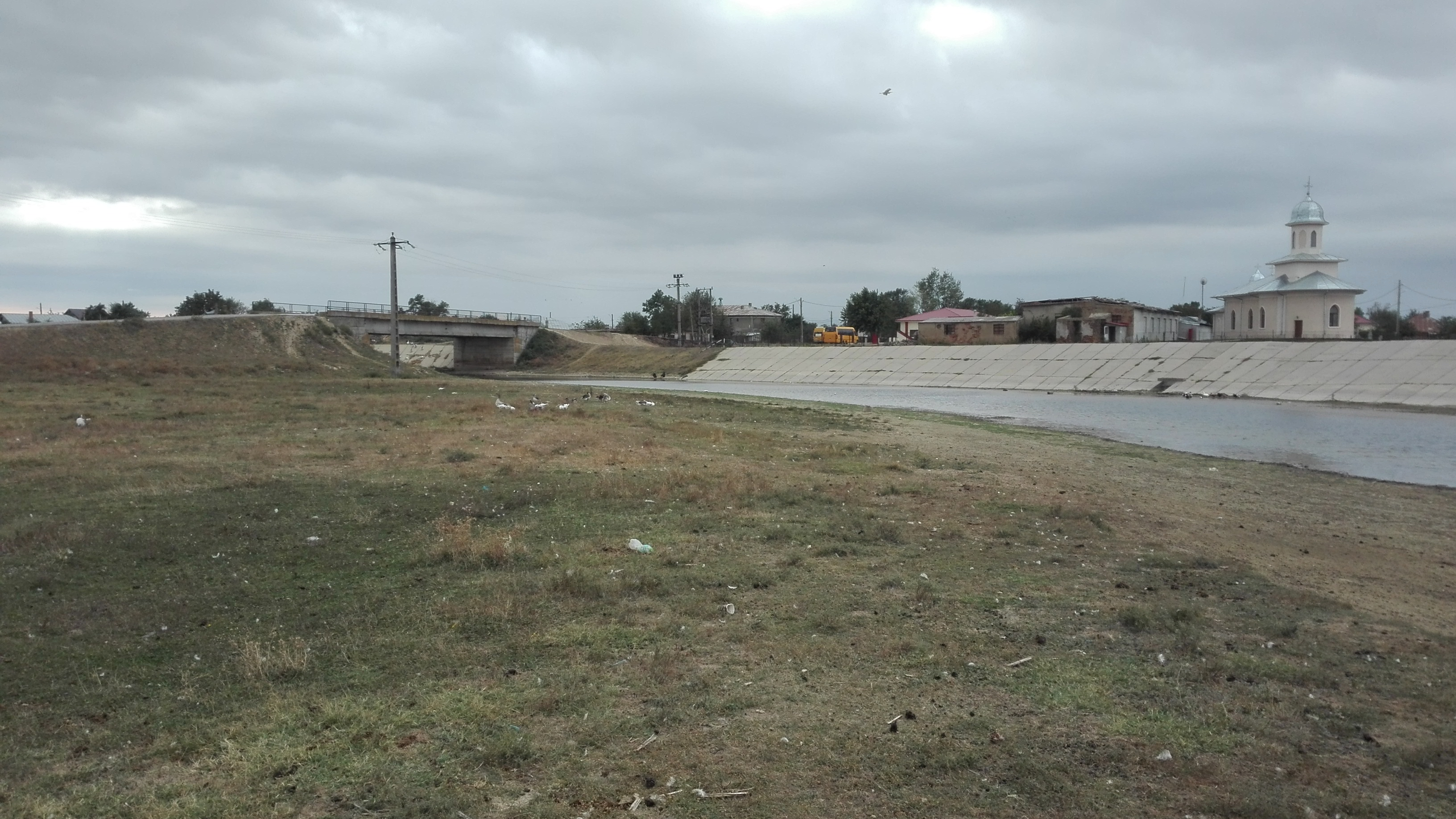

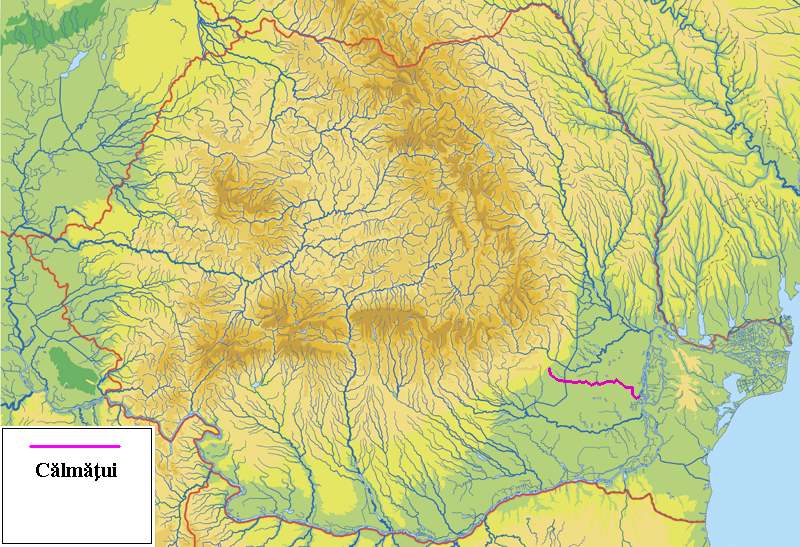

Location
- Country: Romania
- Counties: Buzău, Brăila
- Towns: Smeeni, Însurăței

Physical characteristics
- Source: South of Buzău
- Mouth: Danube
  - location: Gura Călmățui
  - coordinates: 44°49′52″N 27°49′38″E
- Length: 152 km (94 mi)
- Basin size: 1,668 km^{2} (644 sq mi)

Basin features
- Progression: Danube→ Black Sea
- Tributaries
  - left: Rușavăț, Negreasca, Strâmbul, Buzoel

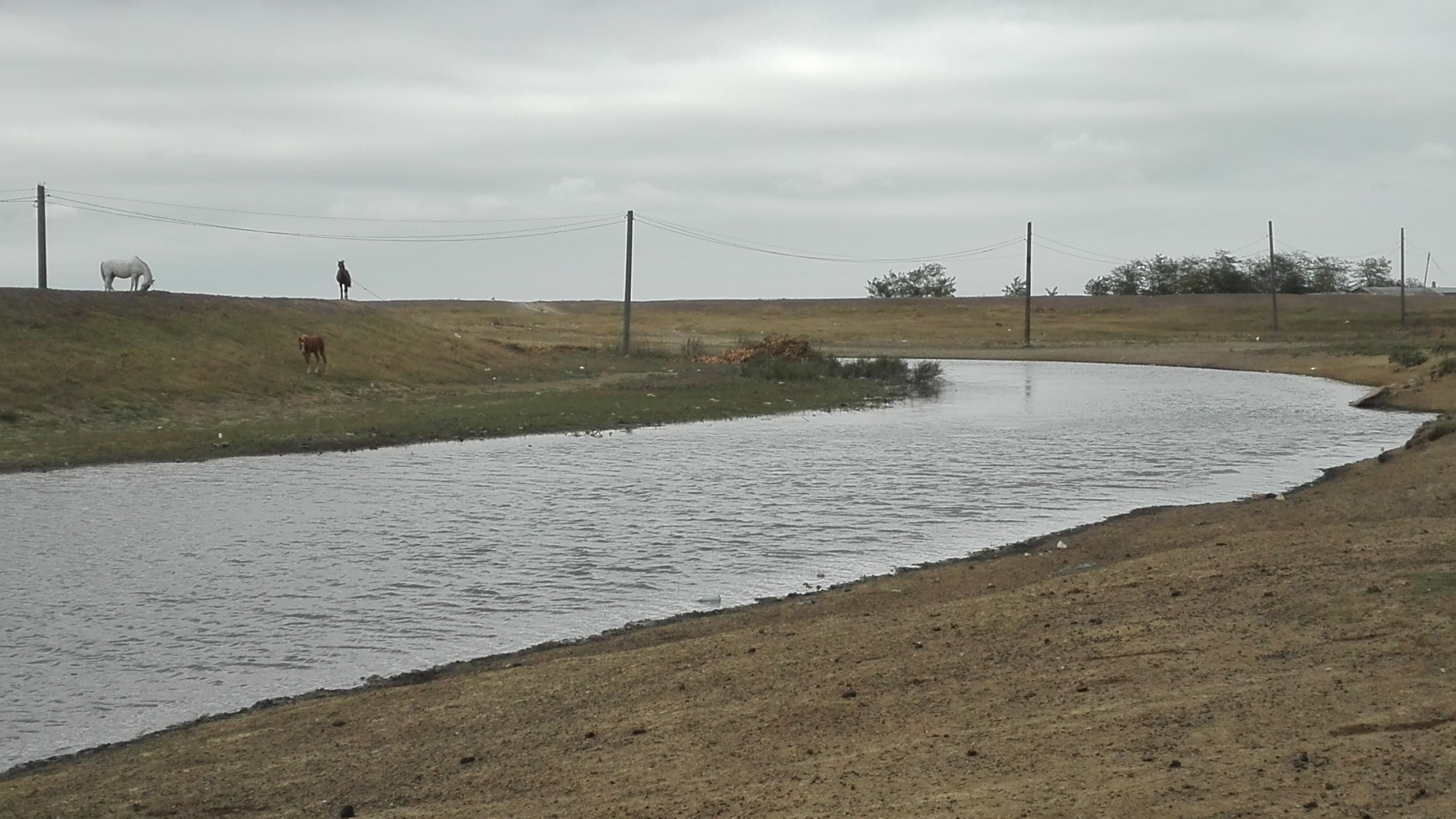

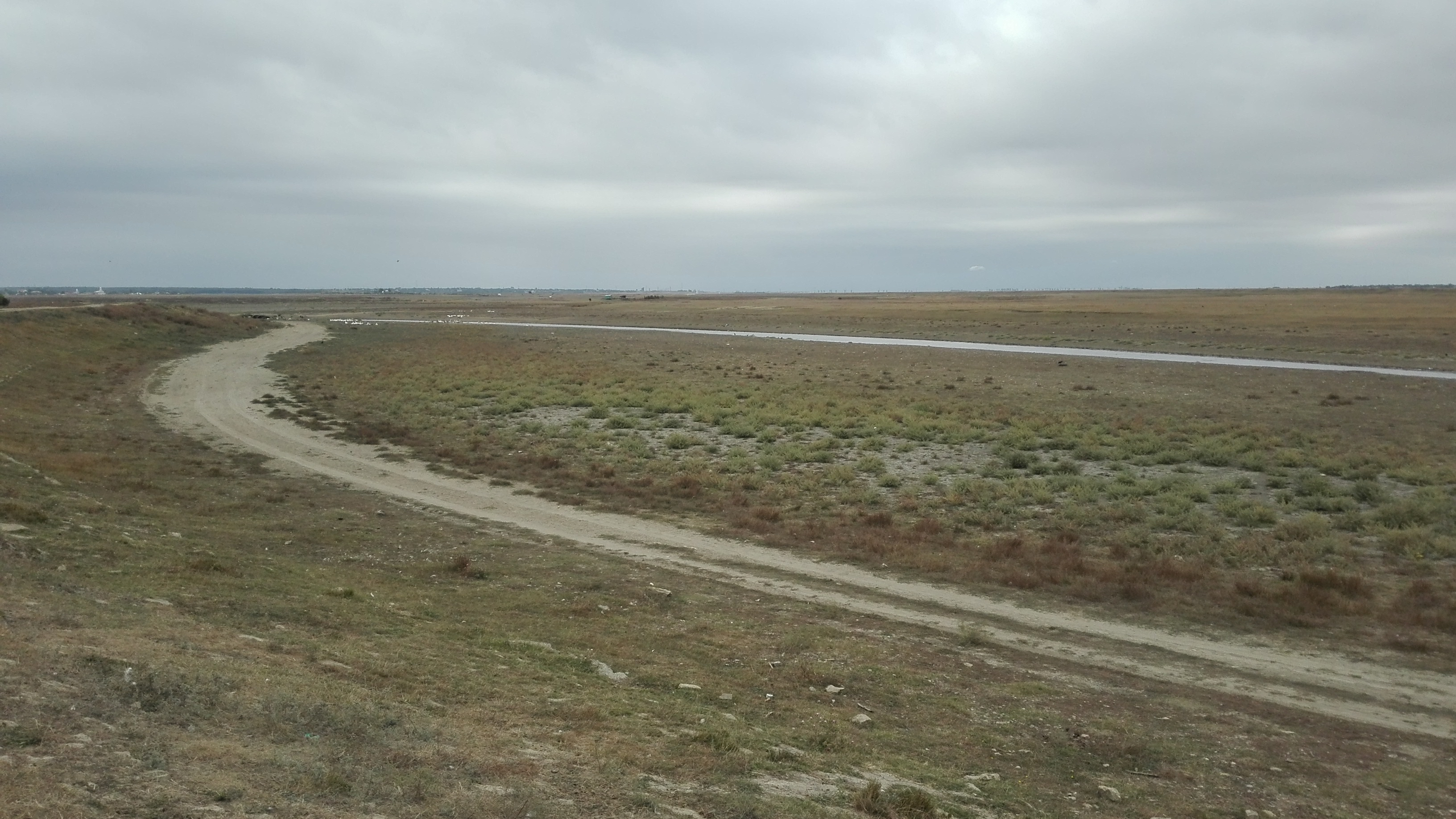

The Călmățui is a left tributary of the Danube in Romania. Its source is a few kilometers southwest of Buzău. The 152 km (94 mi) long Călmățui flows generally eastwards and into the Danube at Gura Călmățui. Its basin size is 1,668 km^{2} (644 sq mi).
