= Smeeni =

- Commune
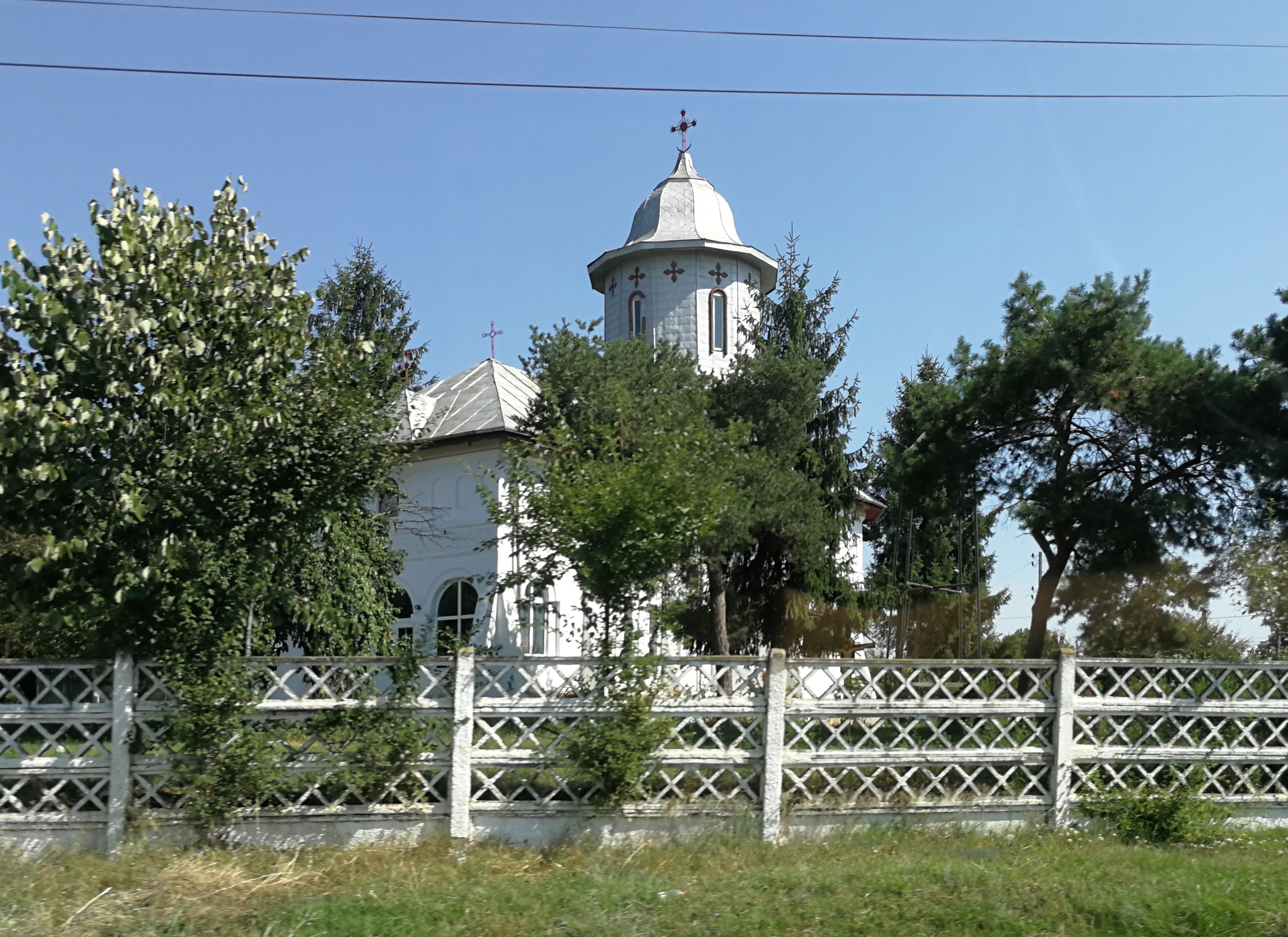
- Saint Basil's Church in Călțuna

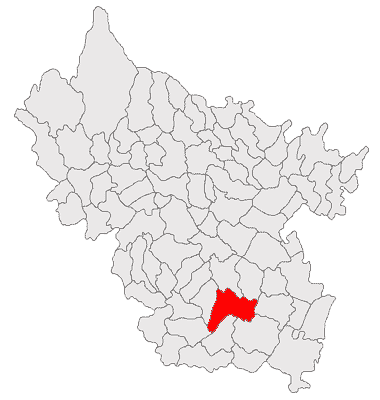
- Location in Buzău County

- Location in Romania
- Coordinates: 44°59′30″N 26°51′20″E
- Country: Romania
- County: Buzău
- Subdivisions: Albești, Bălaia, Călțuna, Moisica, Smeeni, Udați-Lucieni, Udați-Mânzu

Government
  - Mayor (2020–2024): Ion Andrei (PSD)
- Area: 104.58 km^{2} (40.38 sq mi)
- Elevation: 73 m (240 ft)
- Population (2021-12-01): 5,806
  - Density: 55.52/km^{2} (143.8/sq mi)
- Time zone: UTC+02:00 (EET)
  - Summer (DST): UTC+03:00 (EEST)
- Postal code: 127595
- Area code: +(40) 238
- Vehicle reg.: BZ
- Website: www.comunasmeeni.ro

Smeeni is a commune in Buzău County, Muntenia, Romania. It is composed of seven villages: Albești, Bălaia, Călțuna, Moisica, Smeeni, Udați-Lucieni, and Udați-Mânzu.

Historical population
Year	Pop.	±%
2002	7,067	—
2011	6,649	−5.9%
2021	5,806	−12.7%
Source: Census data

== Natives ==
- Chivu Stoica (1908–1975), communist politician, President of the Council of Ministers of the Romanian People's Republic (1955–1961)

== Notes ==
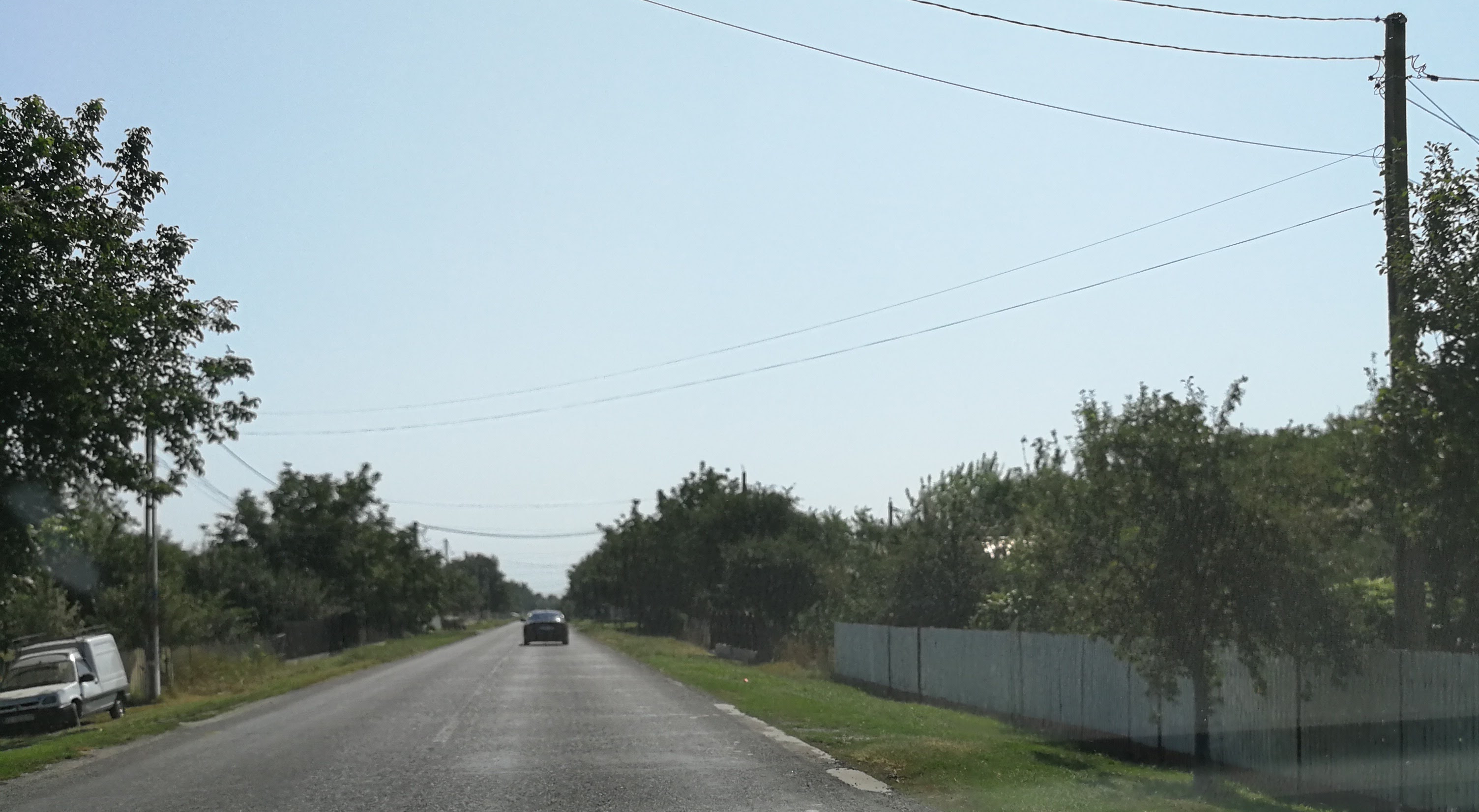
Albești village

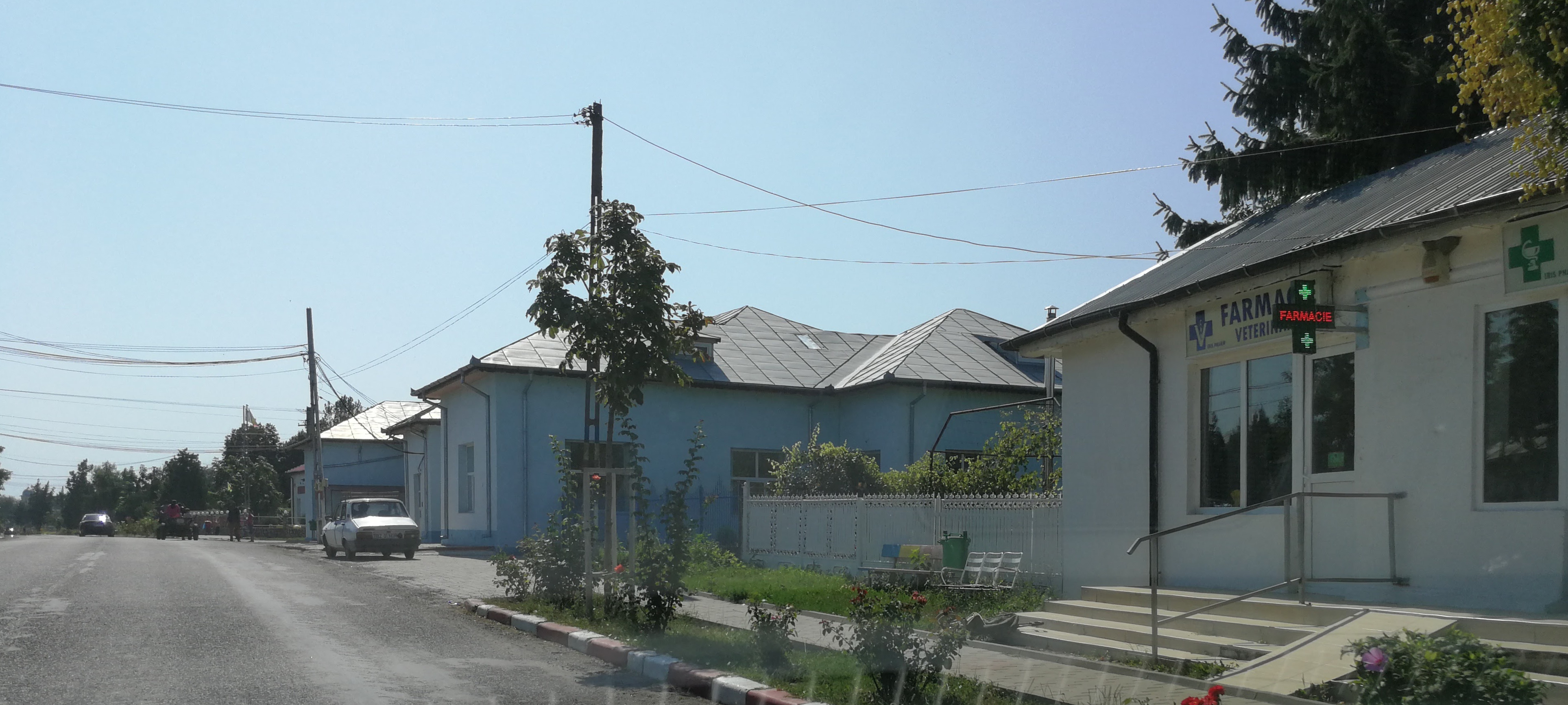
Smeeni village
