= Mihăilești, Buzău =

Mihăilești
- Commune
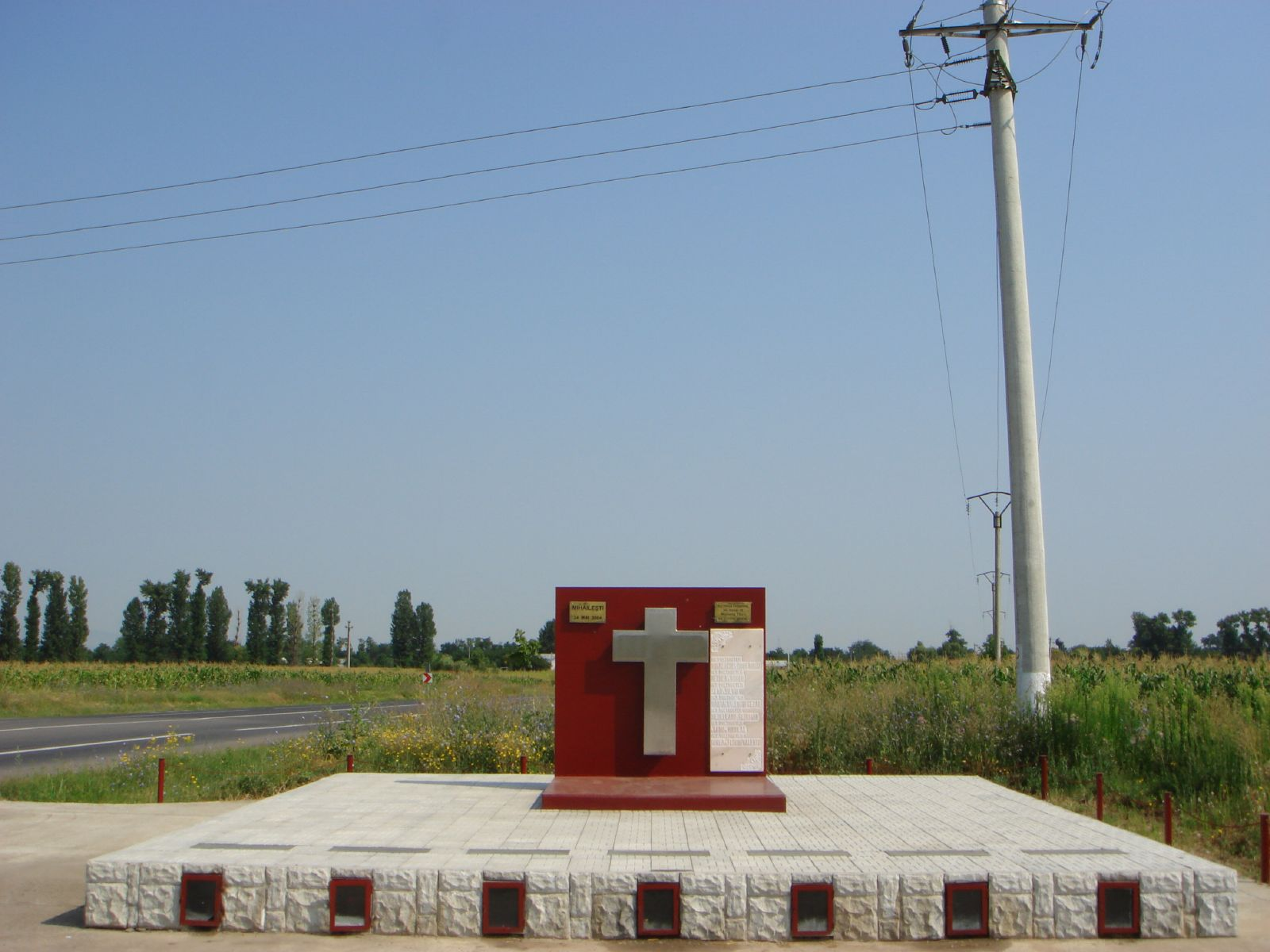
- Monument honoring the victims of the 2004 Mihăilești explosion

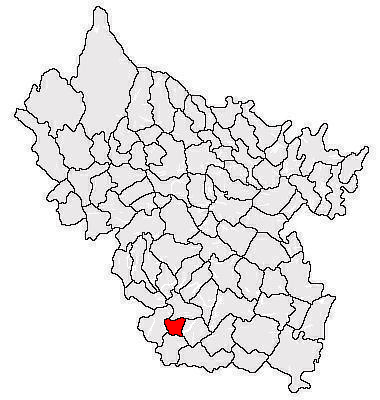
- Location in Buzău County

- Location in Romania
- Coordinates: 44°55′N 26°40′E
- Country: Romania
- County: Buzău
- Subdivisions: Colțăneni, Mărgineanu, Mihăilești, Satu Nou

Government
  - Mayor (2020–2024): Dorinel Petre (PSD)
- Area: 25.48 km^{2} (9.84 sq mi)
- Elevation: 74 m (243 ft)
- Population (2021-12-01): 2,137
  - Density: 83.87/km^{2} (217.2/sq mi)
- Time zone: UTC+02:00 (EET)
  - Summer (DST): UTC+03:00 (EEST)
- Postal code: 127375
- Area code: +(40) 238
- Vehicle reg.: BZ
- Website: www.comunamihailesti.ro

Mihăilești is a commune in Buzău County, Muntenia, Romania. It is composed of four villages: Colțăneni, Mărgineanu, Mihăilești, and Satu Nou.

The Mihăilești explosion took place there in 2004.

Historical population
Year	Pop.	±%
2002	2,136	—
2011	2,084	−2.4%
2021	2,137	+2.5%
Source: Census data
