= Movila Banului =

- Commune
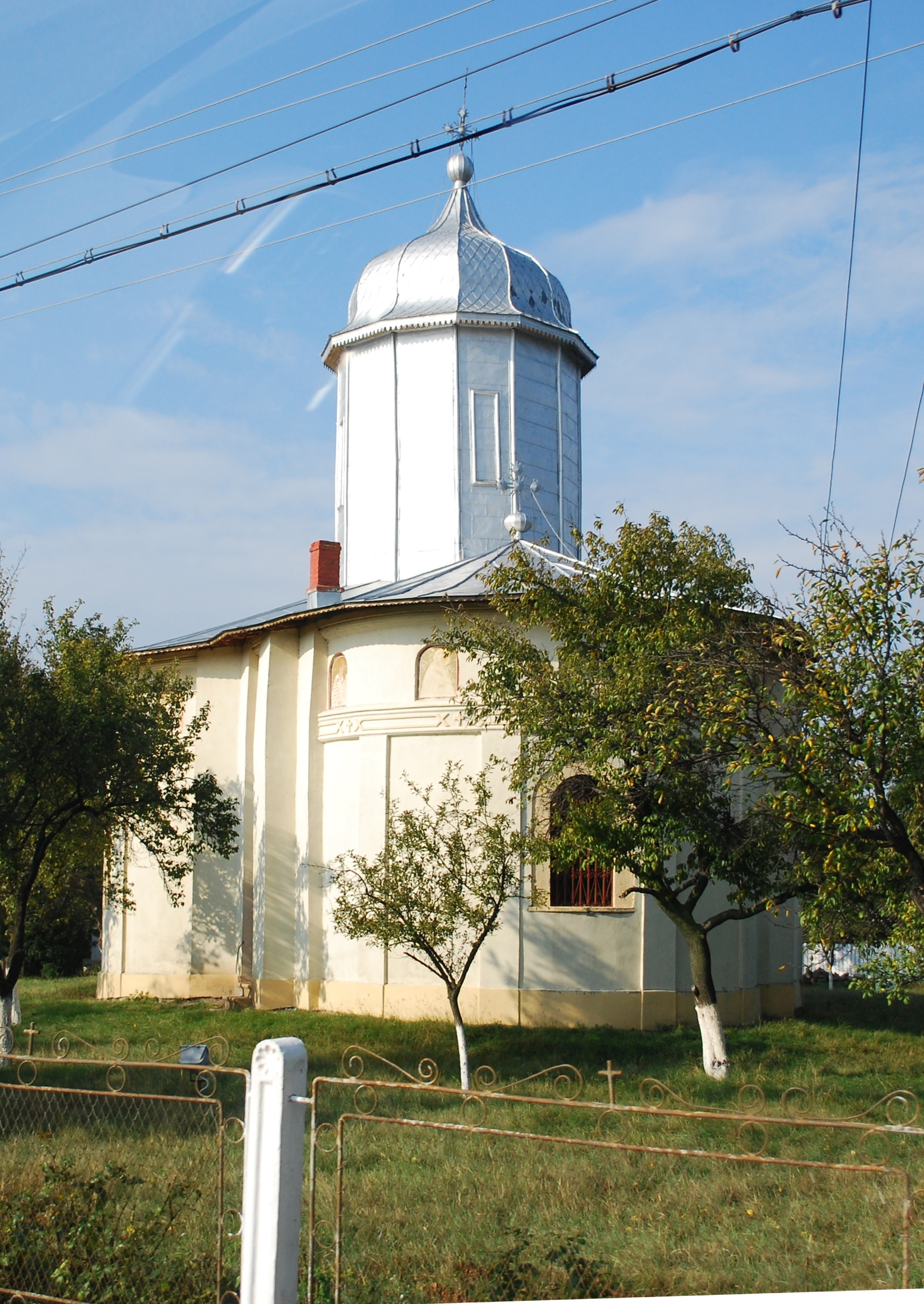
- Romanian Orthodox church in Limpeziș

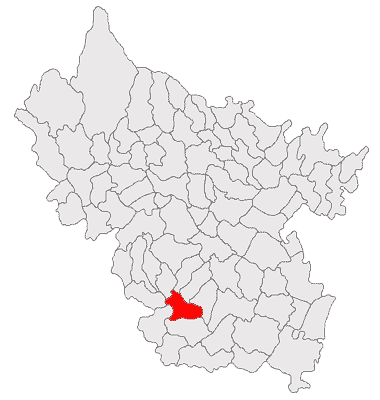
- Location in Buzău County

- Location in Romania
- Coordinates: 44°59′20″N 26°41′0″E
- Country: Romania
- County: Buzău
- Subdivisions: Cioranca, Limpeziș, Movila Banului

Government
  - Mayor (2020–2024): Dorin-Romică Moise (PSD)
- Area: 57.64 km^{2} (22.25 sq mi)
- Elevation: 72 m (236 ft)
- Population (2021-12-01): 2,416
  - Density: 41.92/km^{2} (108.6/sq mi)
- Time zone: UTC+02:00 (EET)
  - Summer (DST): UTC+03:00 (EEST)
- Postal code: 127380
- Area code: +(40) 238
- Vehicle reg.: BZ
- Website: www.comunamovilabanului.ro

Movila Banului is a commune in Buzău County, Muntenia, Romania. It is composed of three villages: Cioranca, Limpeziș, and Movila Banului.

Historical population
Year	Pop.	±%
2002	2,813	—
2011	2,726	−3.1%
2021	2,416	−11.4%
Source: Census data

== Notes ==
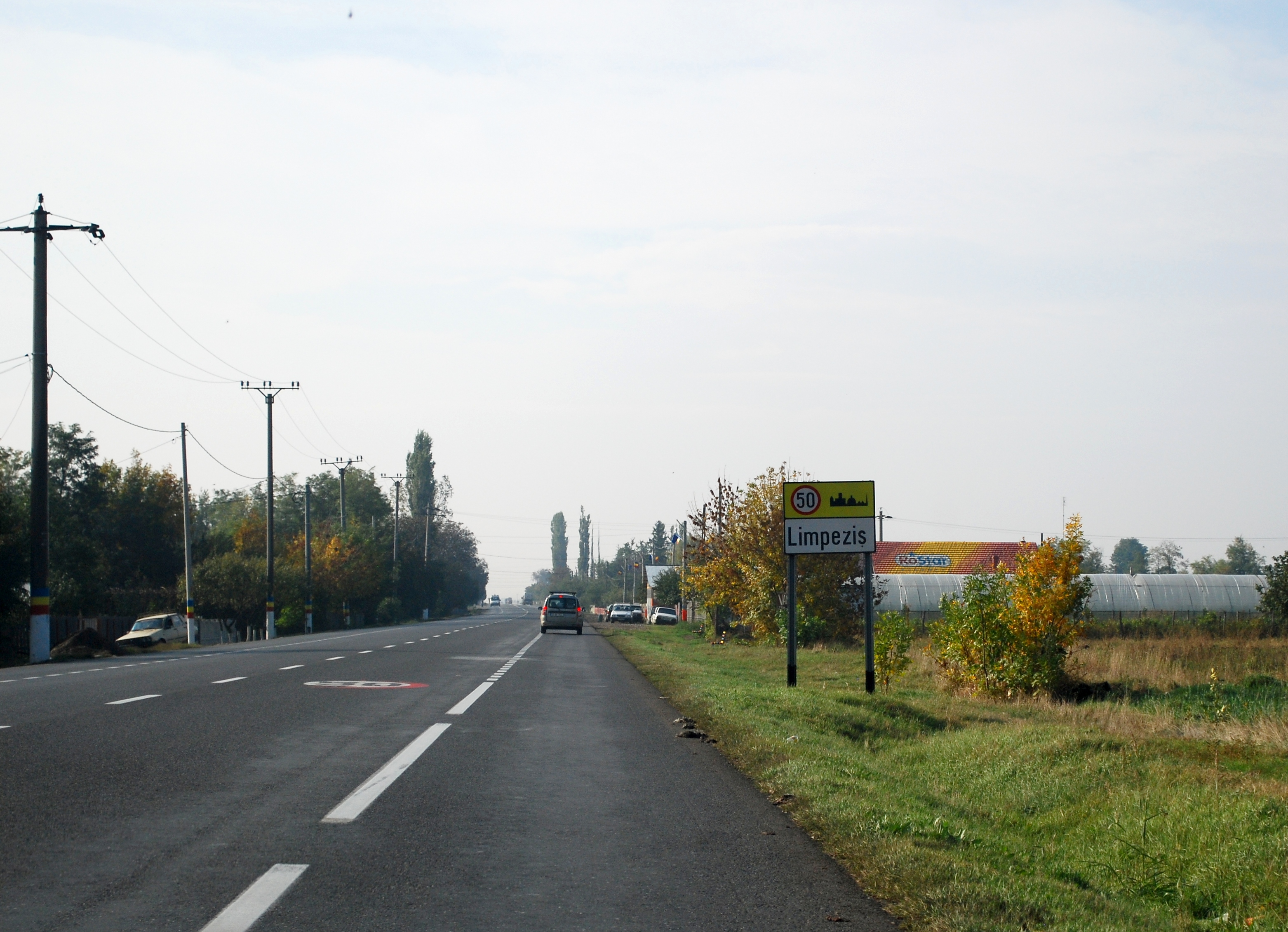
DN2 entering Limpeziș
