= Ciorani =

- Commune
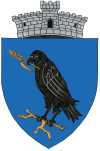
- Coat of arms

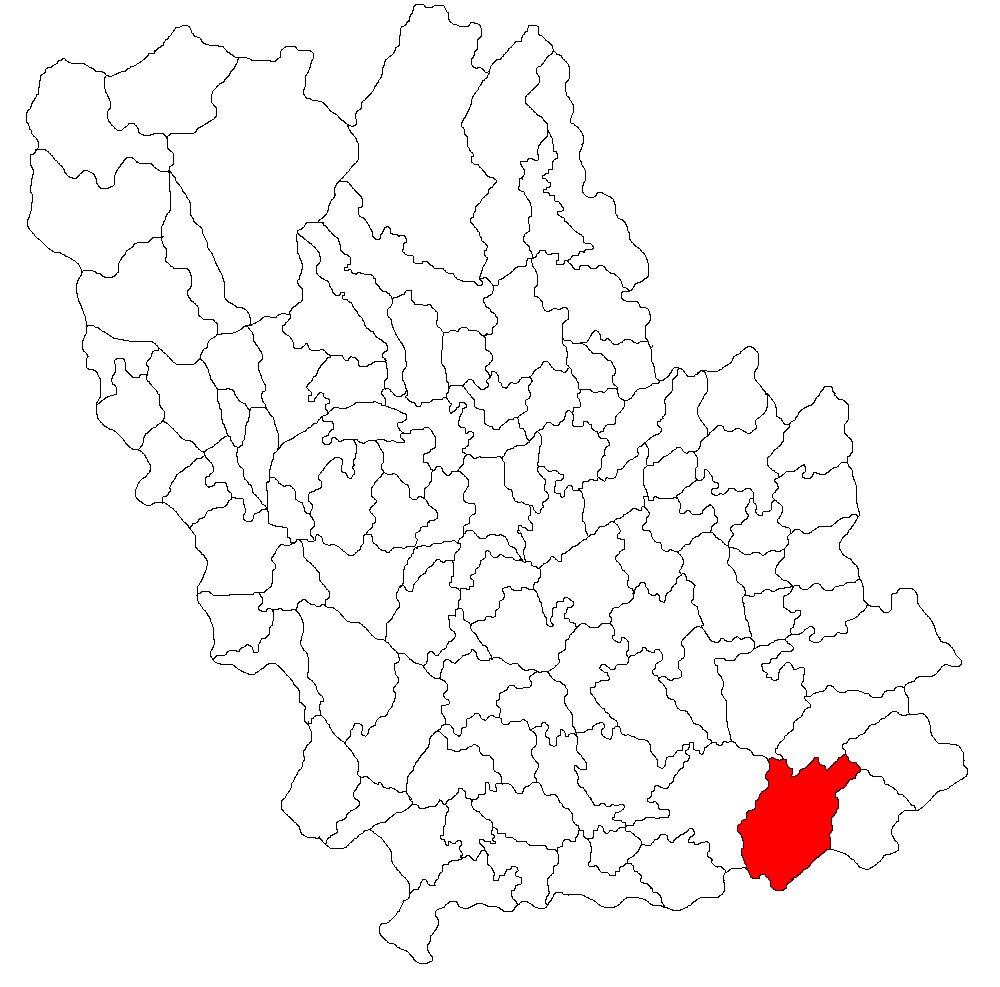
- Location in Prahova County

- Location in Romania
- Coordinates: 44°50′N 26°24′E
- Country: Romania
- County: Prahova

Government
  - Mayor (2020–2024): Voicu Marin (PSD)
- Area: 80.46 km^{2} (31.07 sq mi)
- Elevation: 77 m (253 ft)
- Population (2021-12-01): 5,934
  - Density: 74/km^{2} (190/sq mi)
- Time zone: EET/EEST (UTC+2/+3)
- Postal code: 107155
- Area code: +(40) 244
- Vehicle reg.: PH
- Website: www.primariaciorani.ro

Ciorani is a commune in Prahova County, Muntenia, Romania. As of 2021, its population was 5,934. It is composed of two villages, Cioranii de Jos and Cioranii de Sus; the former is the administrative centre.

The commune is located in the southeastern part of the county, on the left bank of the river Cricovul Sărat, close to where it flows into the Prahova River. It lies on the border with Ialomița County, at a distance of 40 km (25 mi) from the county seat, Ploiești, 23 km (14 mi) from Urlați, 24 km (15 mi) from Mizil, 26 km (16 mi) from Urziceni, and 64 km (40 mi) from Bucharest. The 45th parallel north passes 30 km (19 mi) to the north.

Its neighbors are the communes Fulga to the north, Sălciile to the east, Adâncata to the south, Rădulești to the southwest, and Drăgănești to the west.

Ciorani is traversed north to south by the DN1D road, which joins Ploiești to Urziceni. On the western side of the commune is the Ciorani railway station, serving the CFR rail line Ploiești–Urziceni–Călărași.

The 3,000 m^{2} (32,000 sq ft) archaeological site Movila Dărâmata, in Cioranii de Sus, contains remains of dwellings from the Boian and Gumelnița cultures, as well as from the Bronze Age and Roman Dacia. At the southern entrance to the commune there is a statue of Dromichaetes.

Historical population
Year	Pop.	±%
1992	7,346	—
2002	7,162	−2.5%
2011	6,720	−6.2%
2021	5,934	−11.7%
Source: Census data

== Notable people ==
- Nelu Ploieșteanu (born Ion Dumitrache, 1950–2021), lăutar, singer, and fiddler of lăutărească music
