= Poienari (Prahova) =

Poienari Poenari
- Location within Romania

Location
- Country: Romania
- Counties: Prahova County
- Villages: Poienarii Burchii, Poienarii Apostoli, Gorgota

Physical characteristics
- Mouth: Prahova
  - location: Gorgota
  - coordinates: 44.7945°N 26.1015°E
- Length: 15 km (9.3 mi)
- Basin size: 37 km^{2} (14 sq mi)

Basin features
- Progression: Prahova→ Ialomița→ Danube→ Black Sea

The Poienari or Poenari is a right tributary of the river Prahova in Romania. It discharges into the Prahova in Gorgota. Its length is 15 km (9.3 mi) and its basin size is 37 km^{2} (14 sq mi).
