= Novăcești =

Novăcești may refer to several villages in Romania:

- Novăcești, a village in Bistra Commune, Alba County
- Novăcești, a village in Florești Commune, Prahova County
