= Băicoi Nord oil field =

Oil field in Romania

Băicoi Nord
- Country: Romania
- Region: Prahova County
- Offshore/onshore: onshore
- Operator: Petrom

Field history
- Discovery: 1901
- Start of development: 1901
- Start of production: 1903

Production
- Current production of oil: 800 barrels per day (~40,000 t/a)
- Estimated oil in place: 7.165 million tonnes (~ 8.54×10^{6} m^{3} or 53.7 million bbl)
- Estimated gas in place: 2×10^{9} m^{3} 70×10^{9} cu ft

The Băicoi Nord oil field is an oil field located in Băicoi, Prahova County. It was discovered in 1901 and developed by Petrom. It began production in 1903 and produces oil. The total proven reserves of the Băicoi Nord oil field are around 53.7 million barrels (7.165 million tonnes), and production is centered on 800 barrels per day (130 m^{3}/d).
