= Victor Socaciu =

Romanian folk singer, composer and politician (1953-2021)

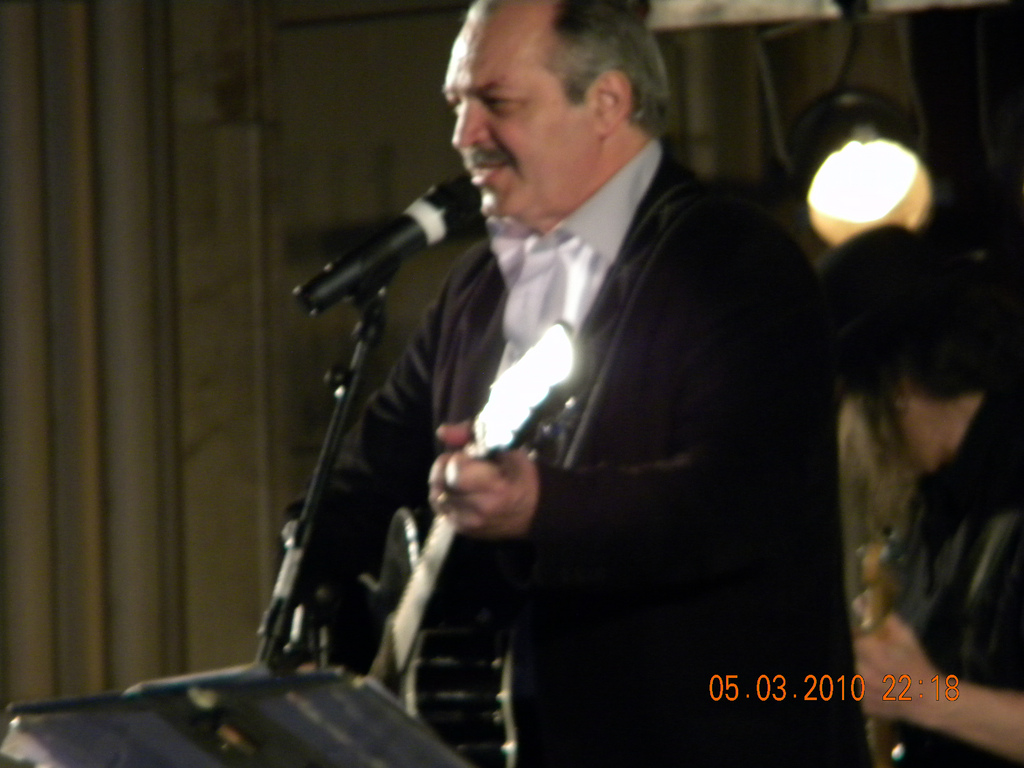
- Socaciu in concert, 2010
- Born: 14 January 1953; Brașov, Romanian People's Republic
- Died: 27 December 2021 (aged 68); Bucharest, Romania
- Resting place: Cornu, Prahova County, Romania
- Occupation(s): Folk singer, composer, politician, diplomat

Victor Socaciu (14 January 1953 – 27 December 2021) was a Romanian folk singer, composer, and politician.

Socaciu served as a Deputy in the Parliament of Romania between 2008 and 2012, representative of Social Democrat Party. In 2014 he was named General Consul of Romania in Montreal, Canada.

He died on 27 December 2021, at the age of 68, from COVID-19.
