= Filipeștii =

Filipeștii may refer to two communes in Prahova County, Romania:

- Filipeștii de Pădure
- Filipeștii de Târg

== See also ==
- Filipești
