= Valea Stânei River =

Valea Stânei River may refer to:

- Valea Stânei, a tributary of the Bistrița in Suceava County
- Valea Stânei, a tributary of the Capra in Neamț County
- Valea Stânei, a tributary of the Izvorul Dorului in Prahova County
- Valea Stânei, a tributary of the Prahova in Brașov County
- Valea Stânei, a tributary of the Valea lui Coman in Argeș County

== See also ==
- Valea Stânei (disambiguation)
- Stâna River (disambiguation)
