= Valea Beliei =

- Location within Romania

Location
- Country: Romania
- Counties: Prahova County

Physical characteristics
- Mouth: Prahova
  - location: Gura Beliei
  - coordinates: 45.2226°N 25.6421°E
- Length: 11 km (6.8 mi)
- Basin size: 36 km^{2} (14 sq mi)

Basin features
- Progression: Prahova→ Ialomița→ Danube→ Black Sea
- Tributaries
  - right: Talea

The Valea Beliei is a right tributary of the river Prahova in Romania. It discharges into the Prahova in Gura Beliei. Its length is 11 km (6.8 mi) and its basin size is 36 km^{2} (14 sq mi).
