= Tătaru =

- Commune
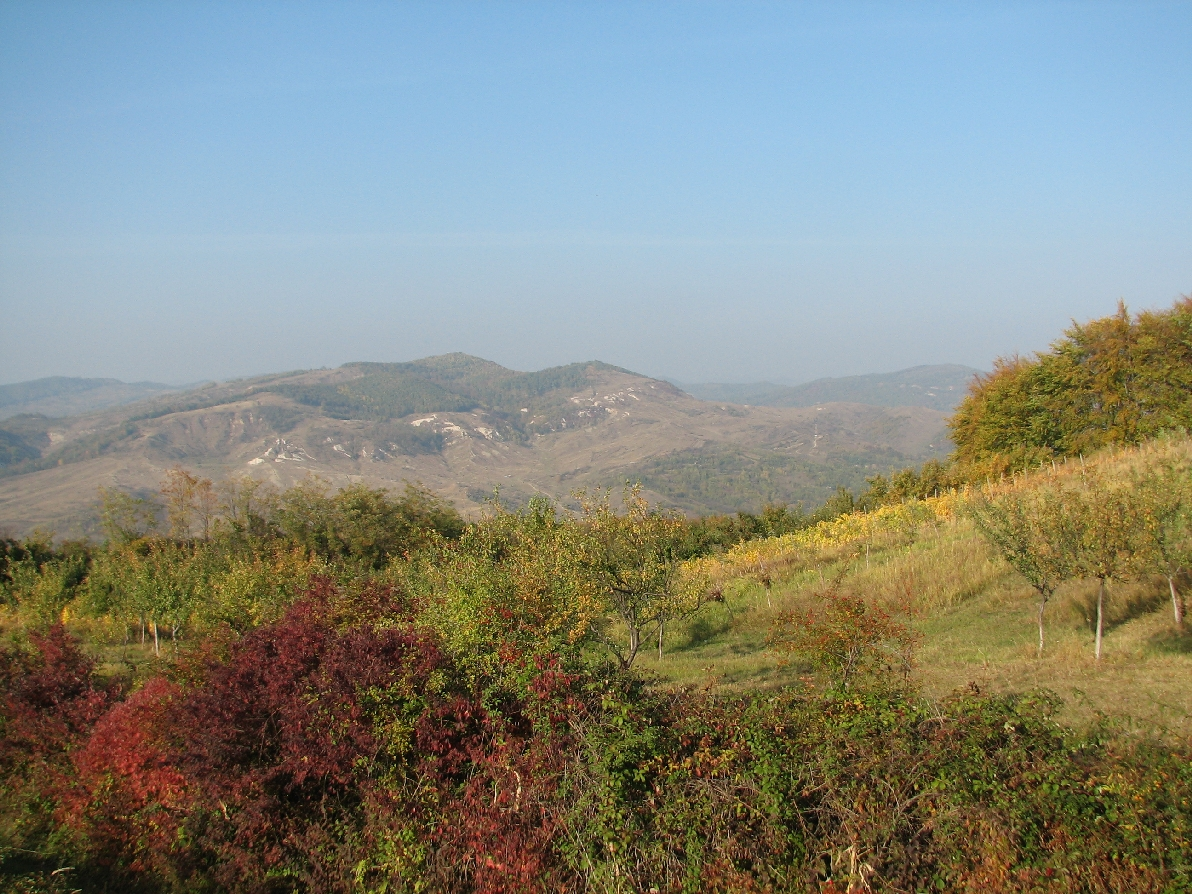
- Landscape near Siliștea

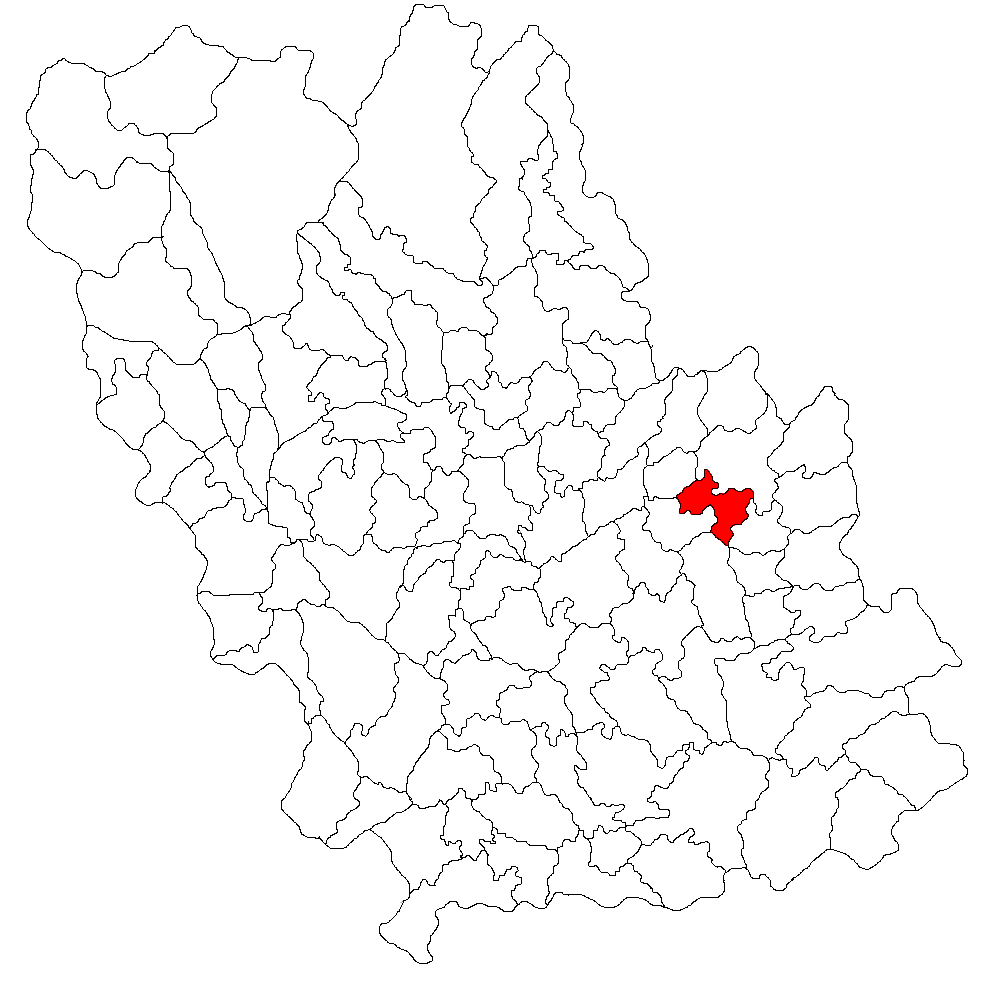
- Location in Prahova County

- Location in Romania
- Coordinates: 45.1082°N 26.3078°E
- Country: Romania
- County: Prahova

Government
  - Mayor (2024–2028): Ionuț Popa (PSD)
- Elevation: 489 m (1,604 ft)
- Population (2021-12-01): 748
- Time zone: UTC+02:00 (EET)
  - Summer (DST): UTC+03:00 (EEST)
- Postal code: 107585
- Area code: +(40) 244
- Vehicle reg.: PH
- Website: primariatataru.ro

Tătaru is a commune in Prahova County, Muntenia, Romania. It is composed of three villages: Podgoria, Siliștea, and Tătaru.

Historical population
Year	Pop.	±%
2002	1,276	—
2011	969	−24.1%
2021	748	−22.8%
Source: Census data
