= Stânișoara River =

Stânișoara River may refer to the following rivers in Romania:

- Stânișoara River (Sunători)
- Stânișoara, a tributary of the Sibișel in Hunedoara County
- Stânișoara River (Cârlibaba)

== See also ==
- Stâna River (disambiguation)
