= Rădulești =

- Commune
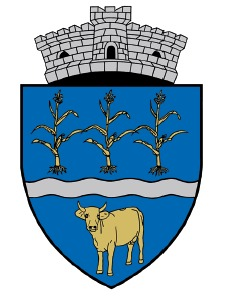
- Coat of arms

- Location in Ialomița County

- Location in Romania
- Coordinates: 44°46′N 26°21′E
- Country: Romania
- County: Ialomița

Government
  - Mayor (2020–2024): Constantin Micu (PSD)
- Area: 22.57 km^{2} (8.71 sq mi)
- Elevation: 81 m (266 ft)
- Population (2021-12-01): 1,169
  - Density: 51.79/km^{2} (134.1/sq mi)
- Time zone: UTC+02:00 (EET)
  - Summer (DST): UTC+03:00 (EEST)
- Postal code: 927055
- Area code: +(40) 243
- Vehicle reg.: IL
- Website: primariaradulesti.ro

Rădulești (Rădulești-Filitis from 1956 to 1960; Brazii from 1960 to 2011) is a commune located in Ialomița County, Muntenia, Romania. It is composed of three villages: Movileanca, Rădulești, and Răsimnicea.

The commune is situated in the Wallachian Plain, at an altitude of 81 m (266 ft). It lies on the right bank of the Prahova River. Rădulești is located in the western part of Ialomița County, bordering on Ilfov County and Prahova County. It is 26 km (16 mi) from Urziceni and 89 km (55 mi) from the county seat, Slobozia. The national capital, Bucharest, is about 50 km (31 mi) to the southwest, while the city of Ploiești is 40 km (25 mi) to the northwest.

Historical population
Year	Pop.	±%
1899	1,160	—
1925	1,668	+43.8%
2002	1,513	−9.3%
2011	1,358	−10.2%
2021	1,169	−13.9%
Source: Census data
