= Câmpea =

Câmpea Câmpinița
- Location within Romania

Location
- Country: Romania
- Counties: Prahova County

Physical characteristics
- Mouth: Prahova
  - location: Upstream of Câmpina
  - coordinates: 45.1360°N 25.7123°E
- Length: 14 km (8.7 mi)
- Basin size: 30 km^{2} (12 sq mi)

Basin features
- Progression: Prahova→ Ialomița→ Danube→ Black Sea

The Câmpea (also: Câmpina, Câmpinița) is a left tributary of the river Prahova in Romania. It flows into the Prahova near the city Câmpina. Its length is 14 km (8.7 mi) and its basin size is 30 km^{2} (12 sq mi).
