= Poiana Câmpina =

- Commune
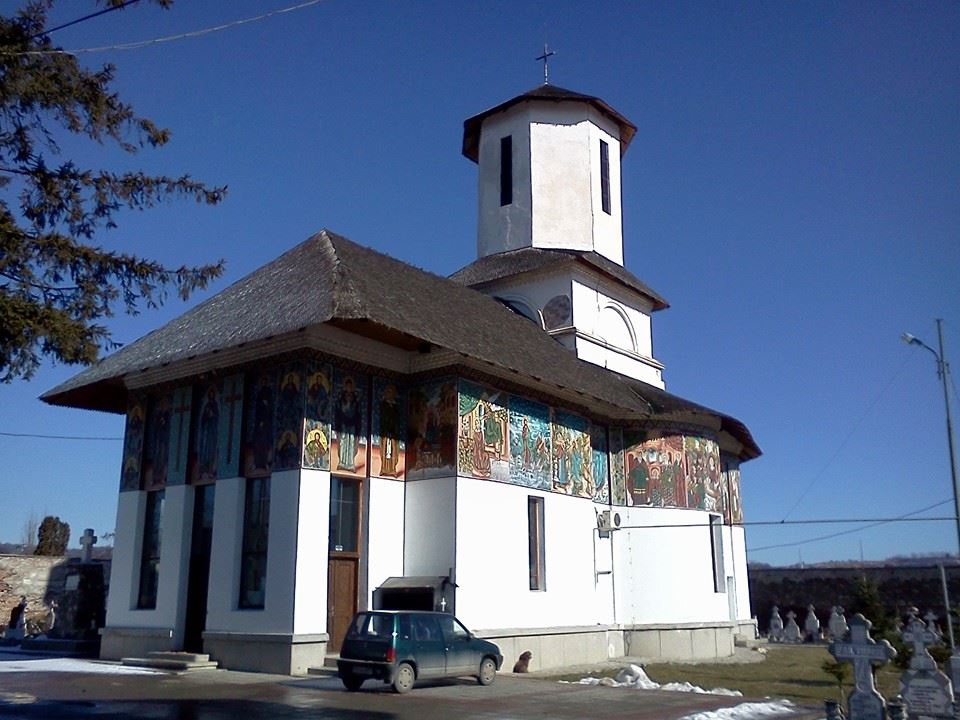
- Church of the Assumption in Poiana Câmpina

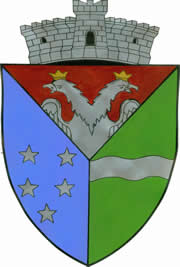
- Coat of arms

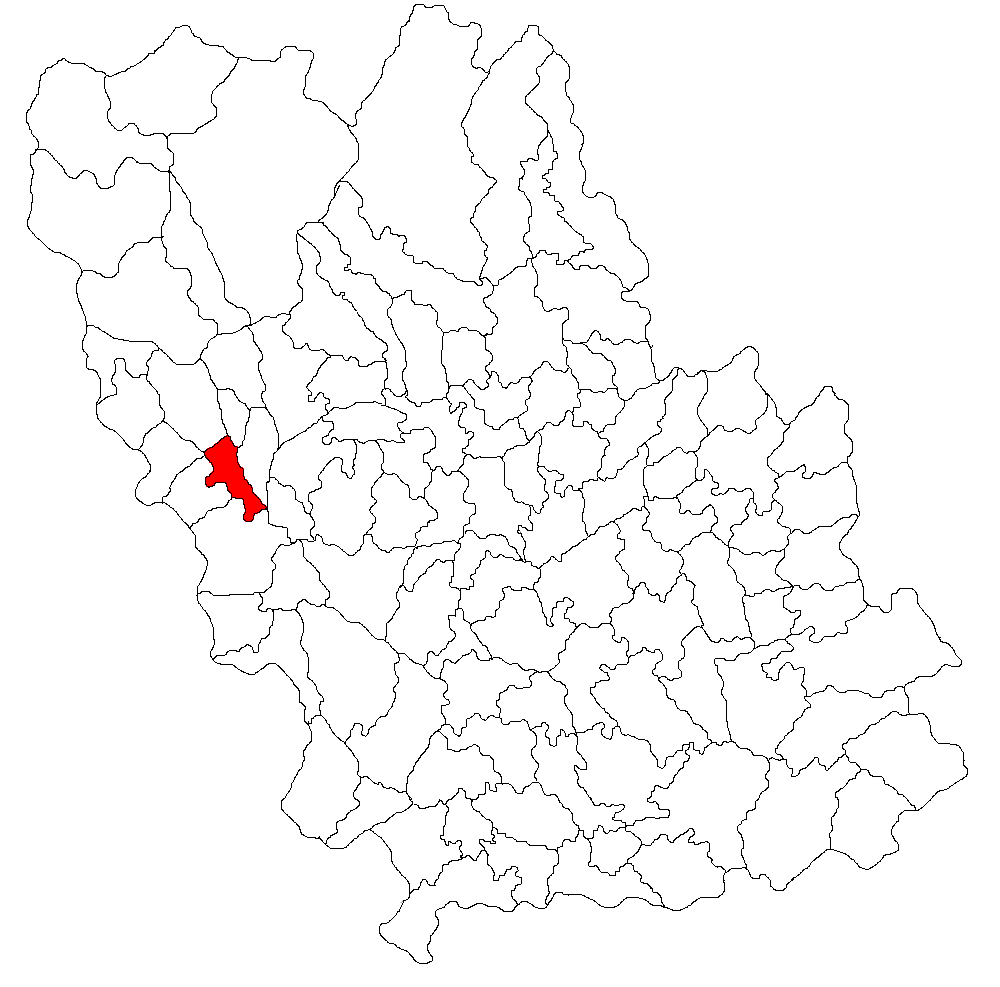
- Location in Prahova County

- Location in Romania
- Coordinates: 45°08′N 25°47′E
- Country: Romania
- County: Prahova

Government
  - Mayor (2020–2024): Sergiu Constanda (PNL)
- Area: 15.41 km^{2} (5.95 sq mi)
- Elevation: 405 m (1,329 ft)
- Population (2021-12-01): 4,361
  - Density: 283.0/km^{2} (733.0/sq mi)
- Time zone: UTC+02:00 (EET)
  - Summer (DST): UTC+03:00 (EEST)
- Postal code: 107425
- Area code: +(40) 244
- Vehicle reg.: PH
- Website: primariapoiana-campina.ro

Poiana Câmpina is a commune in Prahova County, Muntenia, Romania. It is composed of four villages: Bobolia, Pietrișu, Poiana Câmpina, and Răgman.

The commune is located in the western part of the county, 36 km (22 mi) northwest of the county seat, Ploiești. It lies on the right bank of the Prahova River; the city of Câmpina is right across the river. The Romanian Railways line connecting Ploiești to Brașov passes through the commune, with train stations at Câmpina and Bobolia.

Historical population
Year	Pop.	±%
2002	5,348	—
2011	4,746	−11.3%
2021	4,361	−8.1%
Source: Census data

== Notes ==
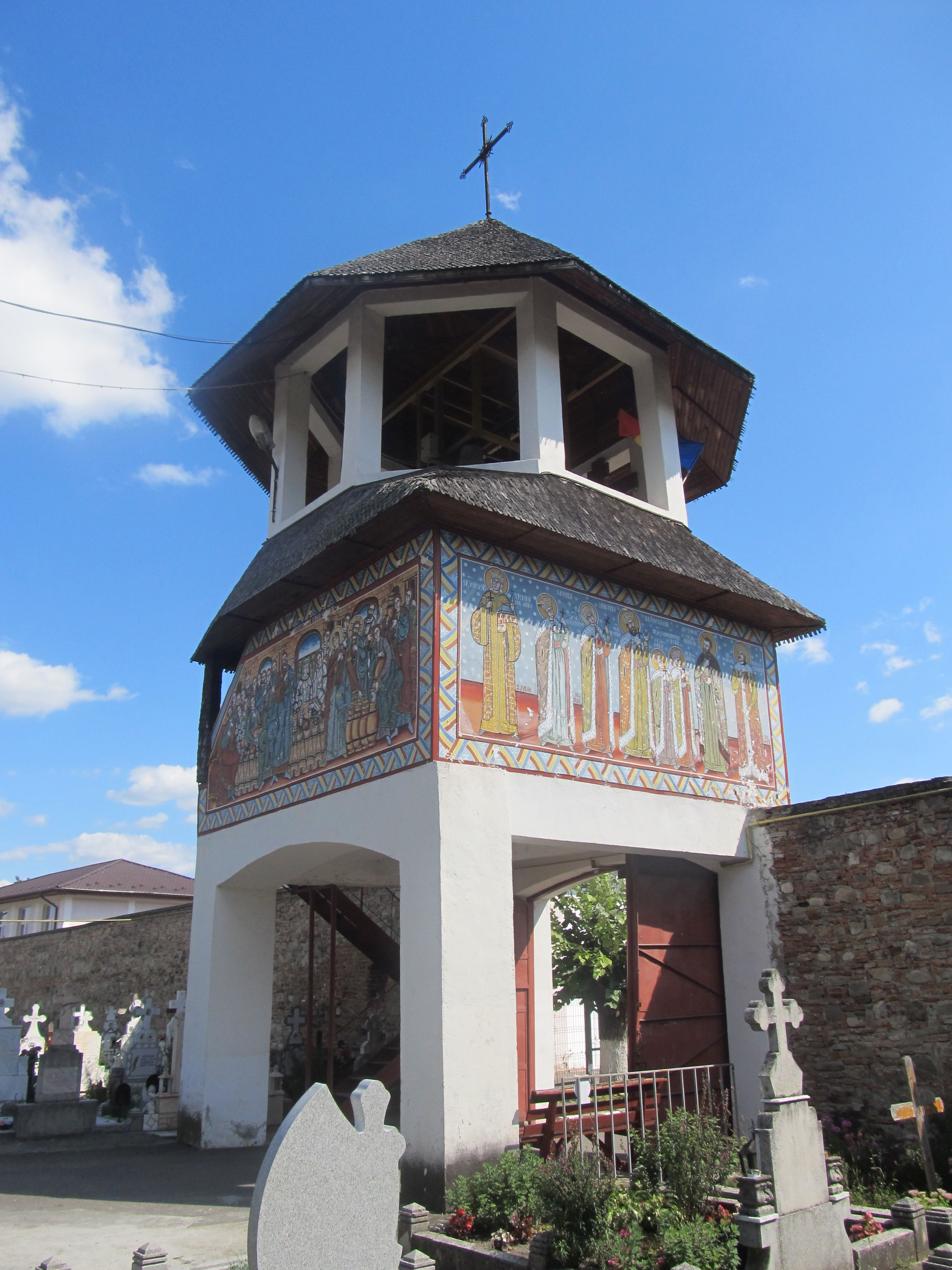
Belfry of the church in Poiana Câmpina

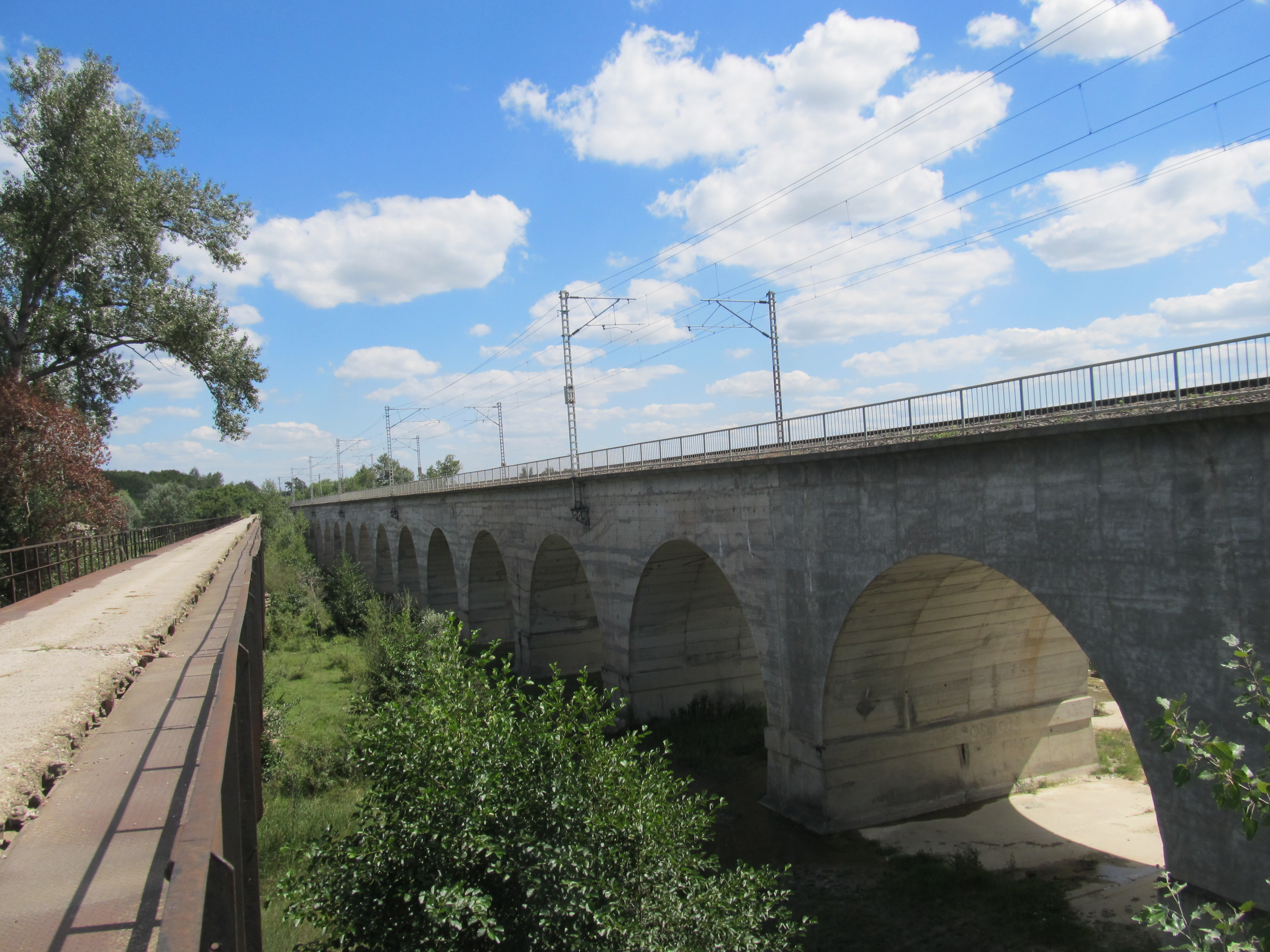
Railway bridge over the Prahova River in Bobolia

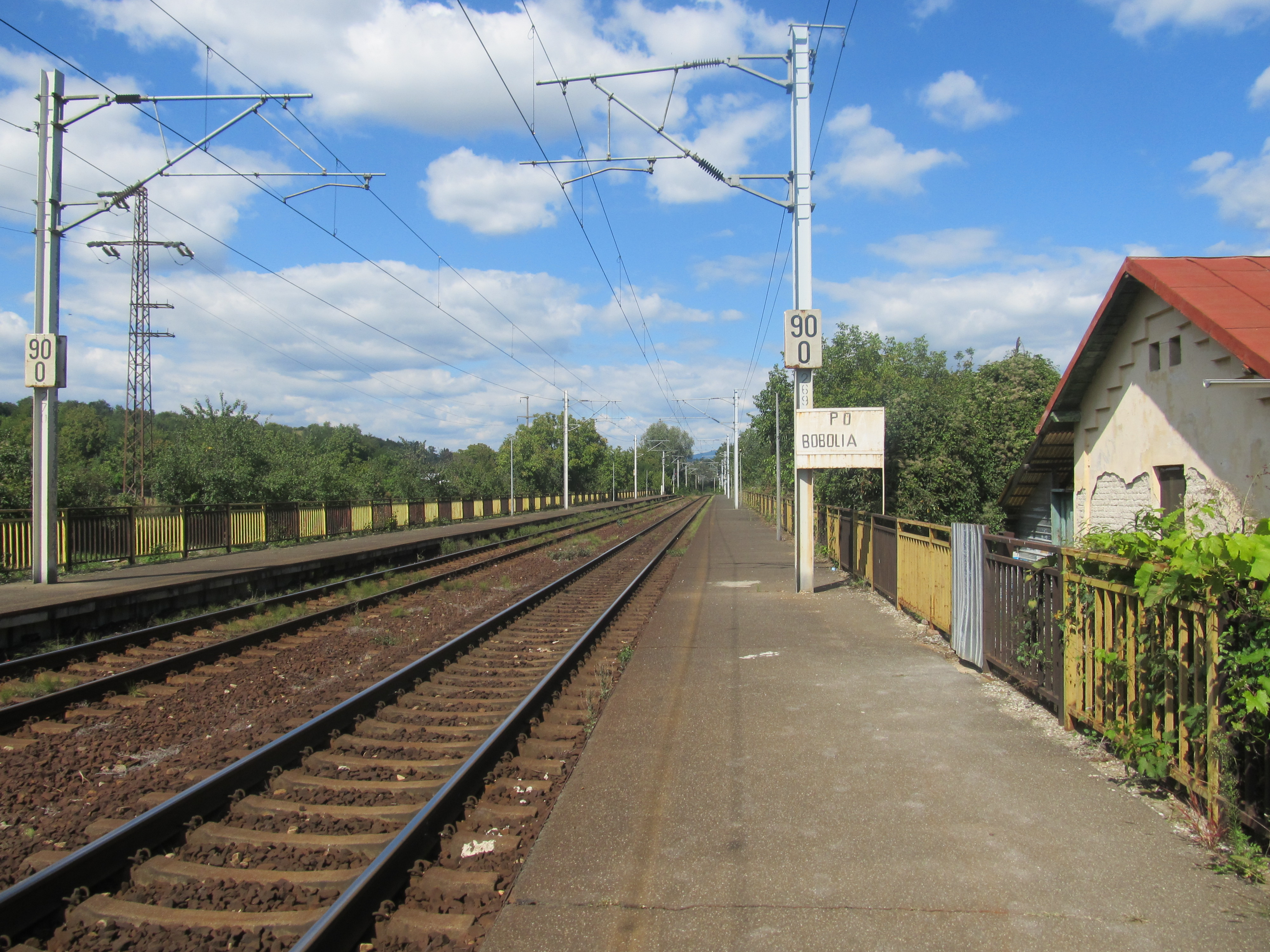
Bobolia railway stop
