= Râșnoava =

Râșnoava Valea Râșnoavei
- Location within Romania

Location
- Country: Romania
- Counties: Brașov County

Physical characteristics
- Mouth: Prahova
  - location: Predeal
  - coordinates: 45.4868°N 25.5649°E

Basin features
- Progression: Prahova→ Ialomița→ Danube→ Black Sea
- Tributaries
  - left: Pârâul Stânei Mari, Valea lui Gheorghiță
  - right: Brădetul, Ghebanul, Leuca

The Râșnoava or Valea Râșnoavei is a right tributary of the river Prahova in Romania. It flows into the Prahova near Predeal.
