= Cornu, Prahova =

Cornu
- Commune
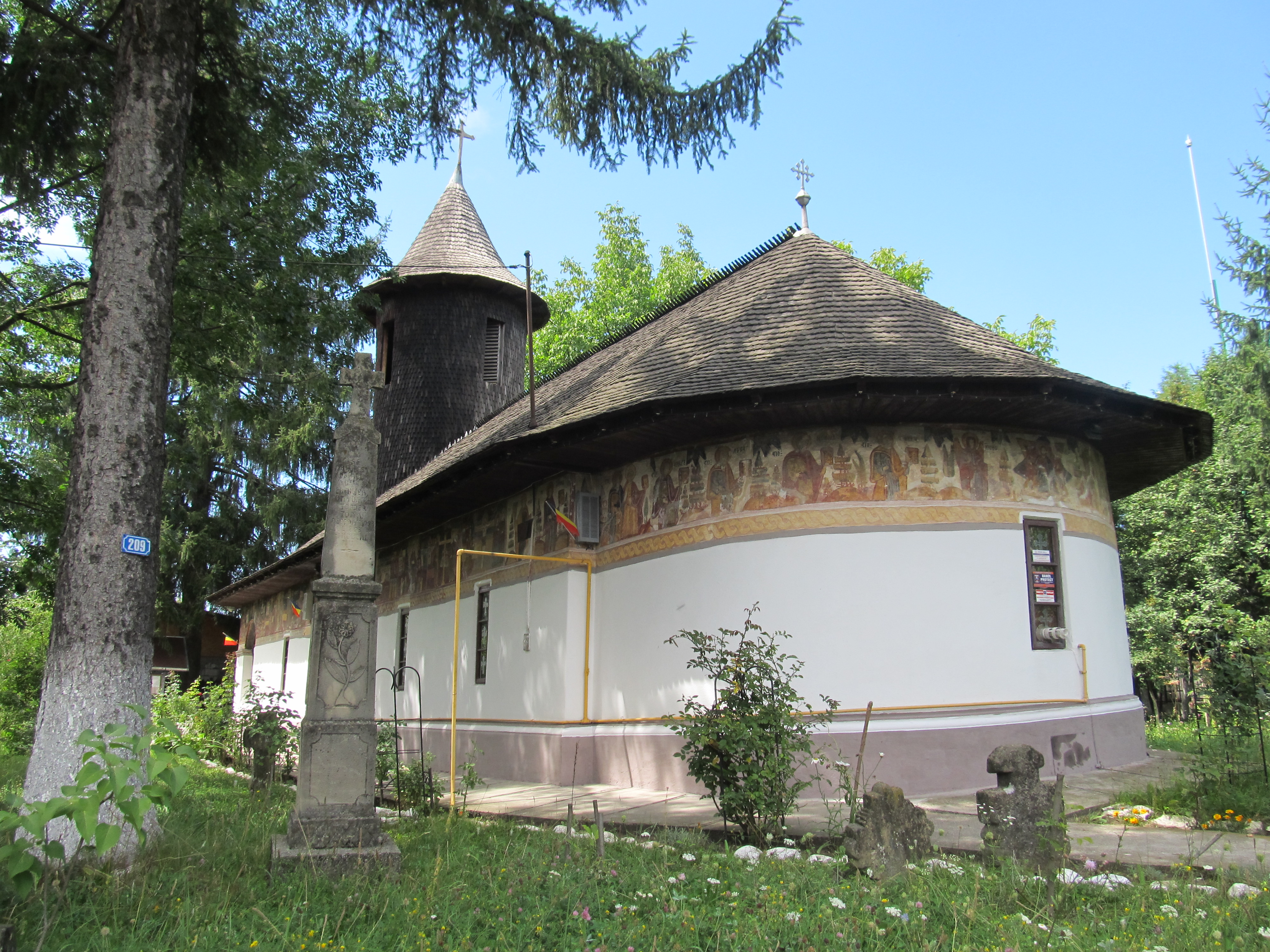
- Ascension Church in Cornu de Sus

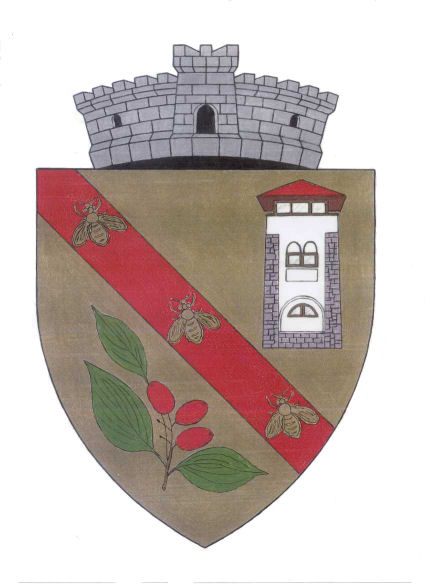
- Coat of arms

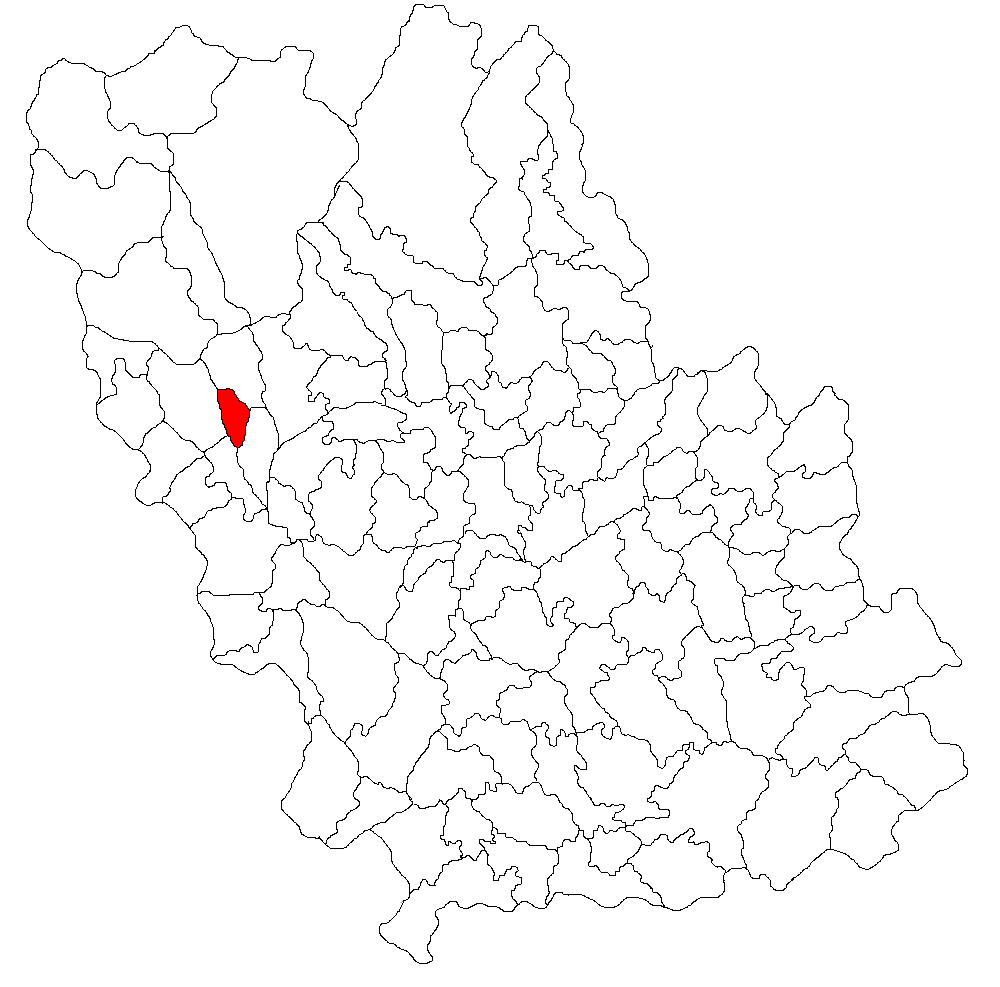
- Location in Prahova County

- Location in Romania
- Coordinates: 45°09′20″N 25°42′10″E
- Country: Romania
- County: Prahova

Government
  - Mayor (2020–2024): Cornel Nanu (PSD)
- Area: 15.09 km^{2} (5.83 sq mi)
- Highest elevation: 600 m (2,000 ft)
- Lowest elevation: 550 m (1,800 ft)
- Population (2021-12-01): 4,444
  - Density: 294.5/km^{2} (762.8/sq mi)
- Time zone: UTC+02:00 (EET)
  - Summer (DST): UTC+03:00 (EEST)
- Postal code: 107175
- Area code: +(40) 244
- Vehicle reg.: PH
- Website: primariacornu.ro

Cornu is a commune in Prahova County, Muntenia, Romania. It is composed of three villages: Cornu de Jos, Cornu de Sus, and Valea Oprii; the administrative centre is Cornu de Jos.

The commune is located in the northwestern part of the county, next to the DN1 road that connects it to the county seat, Ploiești (39 km (24 mi) to the south) and to the capital, Bucharest (90 km (56 mi) to the south), and to Brașov (70 km (43 mi) to the north).

Cornu is traversed by several rivers: Câmpinița (to the east and south), Prahova (to the west), Valea Rea and Balița (from east to west).

Historical population
Year	Pop.	±%
2002	4,472	—
2011	4,516	+1.0%
2021	4,444	−1.6%
Source: Census data

== Natives ==
- Ion Alexe (born 1946), heavyweight boxer
