= Prahova (river) =

River in Romania

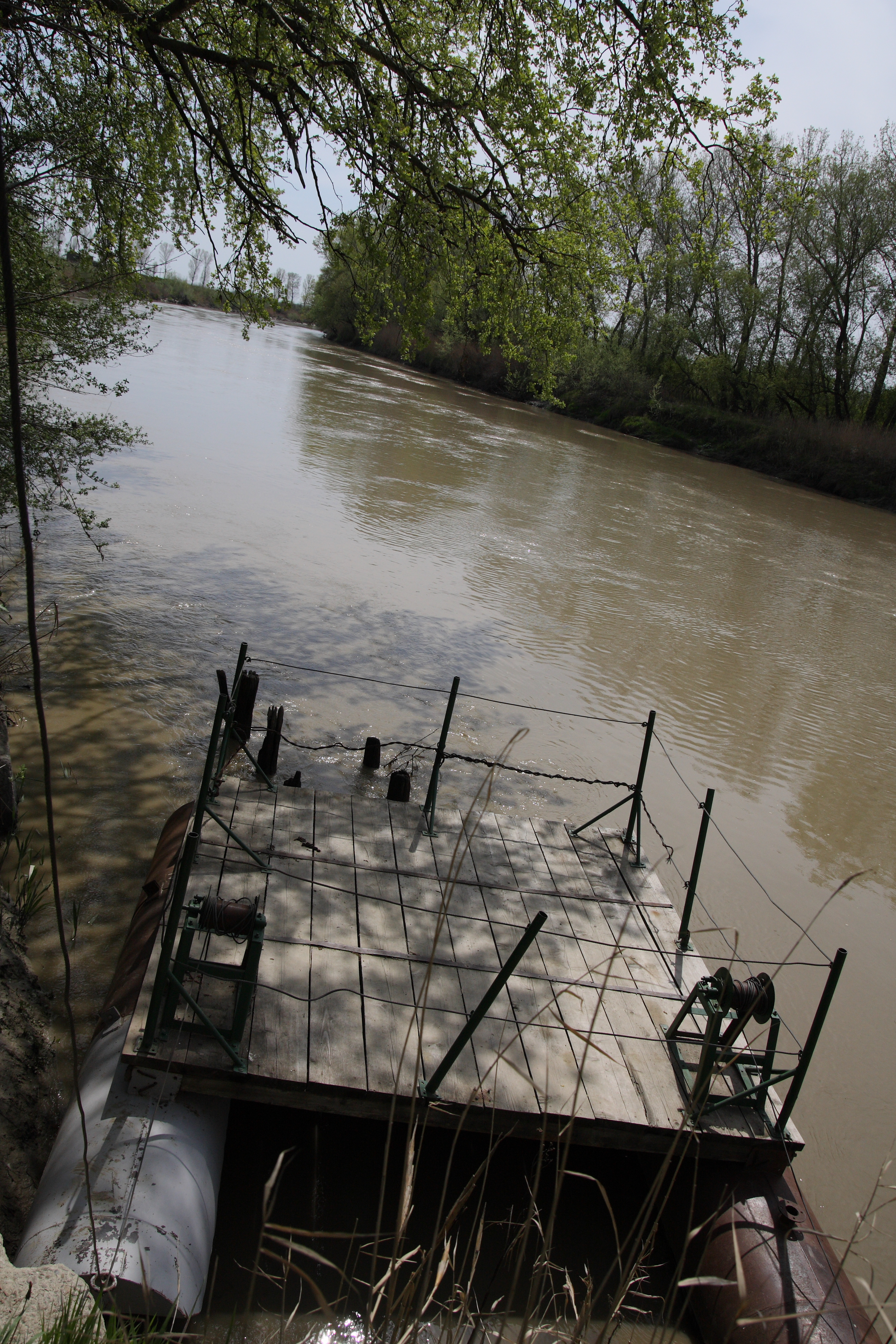
- The Prahova near Adâncata

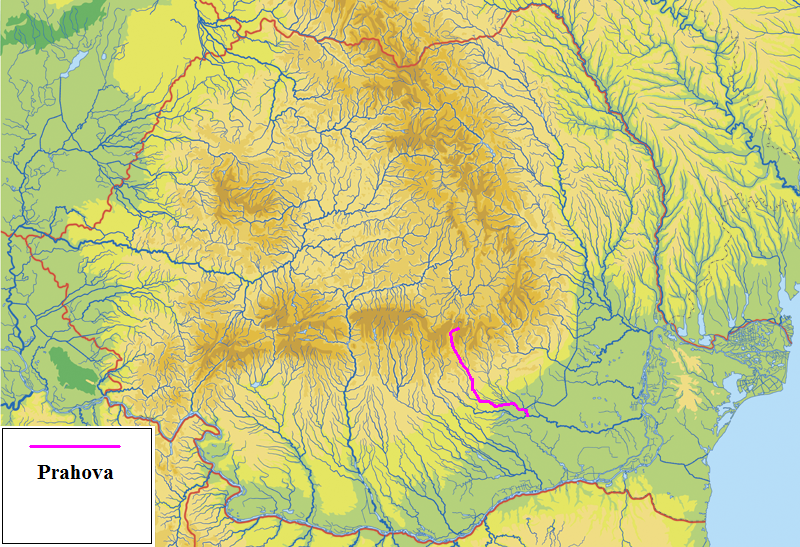

Location
- Country: Romania
- Counties: Brașov, Prahova, Ialomița
- Towns: Bușteni, Sinaia, Comarnic, Breaza, Câmpina

Physical characteristics
- Source: Predeal
  - coordinates: 45°30′30″N 25°34′32″E
  - elevation: 1,037 m (3,402 ft)
- Mouth: Ialomița
  - location: Patru Frați
  - coordinates: 44°42′55″N 26°28′14″E
  - elevation: 63 m (207 ft)
- Length: 193 km (120 mi)
- Basin size: 3,738 km^{2} (1,443 sq mi)
- Discharge
  - location: *
  - average: 28.3 m^{3}/s (1,000 cu ft/s)

Basin features
- Progression: Ialomița→ Danube→ Black Sea
- Tributaries
  - left: Doftana, Teleajen, Cricovul Sărat

The Prahova is a river of Southern Romania, which rises from the Bucegi Mountains, in the Southern Carpathians. It is a left tributary of the Ialomița. It flows into the Ialomița in Dridu Snagov. The upper reach of the river, upstream of the confluence with the river Azuga is sometimes called the Prahovița.

It has a length of 193 km (120 mi), of which 6 km (3.7 mi) are in Brașov County, 161 km (100 mi) are in Prahova County and the last 16 km (9.9 mi) are in Ialomița County.

The basin of the Prahova covers 3,738 km^{2} (1,443 sq mi), which is about 75% of the area of Prahova County.

== Towns and villages ==
The following towns and villages are situated along the river Prahova, from source to mouth: Predeal, Azuga, Bușteni, Poiana Țapului, Sinaia, Posada, Comarnic, Nistorești, Breaza, Cornu, Poiana Câmpina, Câmpina, Bănești, Bobolia, Cocorăștii Caplii, Cap Roșu, Novăcești, Florești, Călinești, Cătina, Filipeștii de Târg, Nedelea, Ariceștii Rahtivani, Ezeni, Zalhanaua, Stăncești, Piatra, Stejaru, Pisculești, Tinosu, Miroslăvești, Palanca, Independența, Belciug, Gherghița, Hătcărău, Tufani, Malamuc, Răsimnicea, Rădulești, Adâncata, Patru Frați.

== Tributaries ==
The following rivers are tributaries to the river Prahova (from source to mouth):

- Left: Puriștoaca, Valea Popii, Olăreasa, Pârâul lui Vlad, Ursoaia Mare, Ursoaia Mică, Azuga, Valea Mărului (I), Valea Seacă (I), Valea Fetei, Valea Seacă (II), Valea Măturarului, Zamora, Șipa, Tufa, Valea Cășăriei (I), Valea Rea, Valea Câinelui, Gagu, Valea lui Bogdan, Valea la Nuci, Valea Mărului (II), Valea Surpăturii, Valea Orății, Conciu, Florei, Câmpea, Doftana, Viișoara, Teleajen, Vitman, Cricovul Sărat
- Right: Joița, Râșnoava, Pârâul Sec, Valea Brusturilor, Valea Stânei, Valea Grecului, Valea Fabricii, Valea Cerbului, Valea Albă, Paltinu, Valea Jepilor, Valea Seacă a Jepilor, Urlătoarea, Valea Babei, Piatra Arsă, Peleș, Valea Cășăriei (II), Valea Iancului, Zgarbura, Izvorul Dorului, Valea Largă, Dogăria, Valea Dracului, Valea Măgarului, Valea Seciului, Valea Obielei, Valea Mesteacănului, Valea Beliei, Viroaga, Poienari, Maia
