= Valea Stânei =

Valea Stânei may refer to several villages in Romania:

- Valea Stânei, a village in Săruleşti Commune, Buzău County
- Valea Stânei, a village in Cârlibaba Commune, Suceava County

== See also ==
- Valea Stânei River (disambiguation)
- Stâna (disambiguation)
