= Stâna River =

Stâna River may refer to the following rivers in Romania:

- Stâna, a tributary of the Bistrița in Neamț County
- Stâna, a tributary of the Camenca in Bacău County
- Stâna, a tributary of the Priboiasa in Vâlcea County

== Others ==
- Gropșoarele Stână, a tributary of the Gropșoarele in Prahova County
- Izvorul Stânei, a tributary of the Latorița in Vâlcea County
- Pârâul Stânei, a tributary of the Bâsca Mică in Buzău County

== See also ==
- Stâna (disambiguation)
- Stânișoara River (disambiguation)
- Valea Stânei River (disambiguation)
