= Gorgota =

- Commune
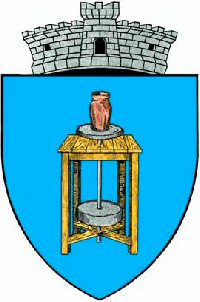
- Coat of arms

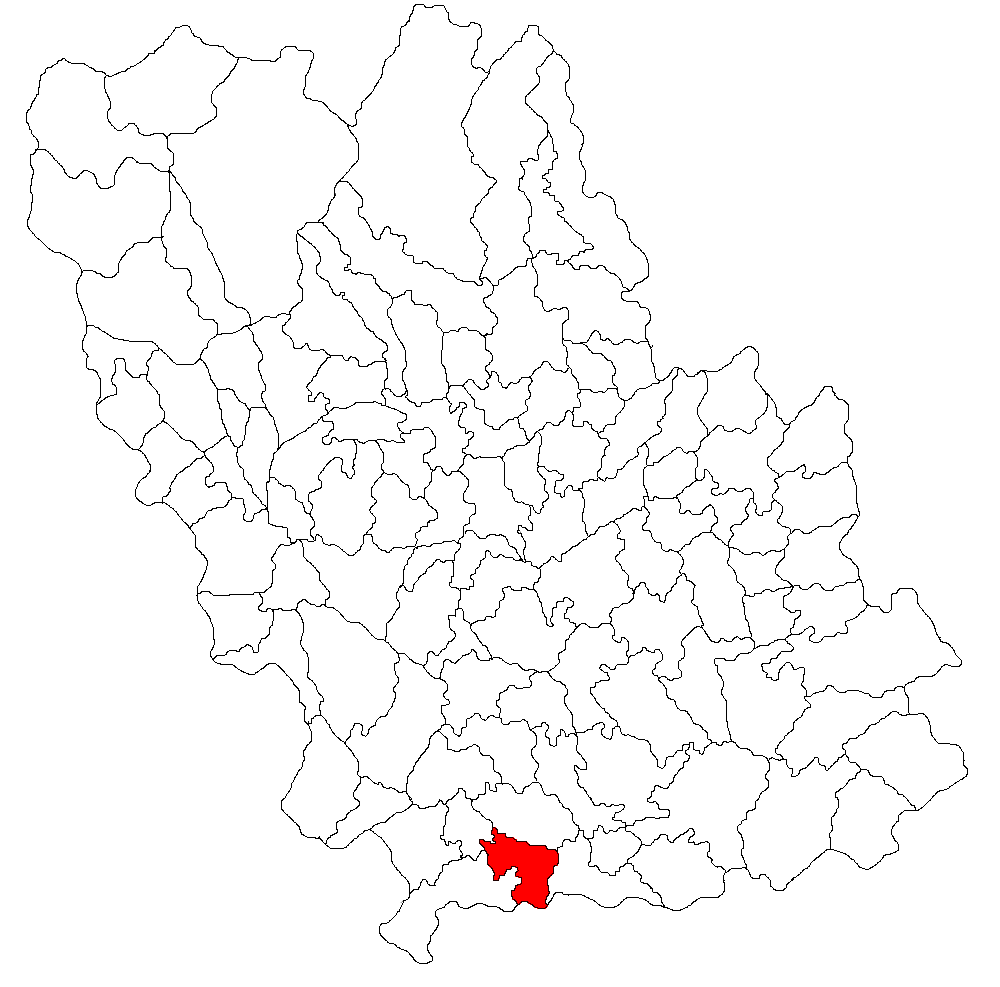
- Location in Prahova County

- Location in Romania
- Coordinates: 44°47′N 26°5′E
- Country: Romania
- County: Prahova

Government
  - Mayor (2024–2028): Dumitru-Ionuț Nicolae (PNL)
- Area: 32.55 km^{2} (12.57 sq mi)
- Elevation: 108 m (354 ft)
- Population (2021-12-01): 4,696
  - Density: 140/km^{2} (370/sq mi)
- Time zone: EET/EEST (UTC+2/+3)
- Postal code: 107275
- Area code: +(40) 244
- Vehicle reg.: PH
- Website: www.primariagorgota.ro

Gorgota is a commune in Prahova County, Muntenia, Romania. It is composed of five villages: Crivina, Fânari, Gorgota, Poienarii Apostoli, and Potigrafu.

Historical population
Year	Pop.	±%
1992	5,811	—
2002	5,554	−4.4%
2011	5,207	−6.2%
2021	4,696	−9.8%
Source: Census data
