= Băicoi =

- Town
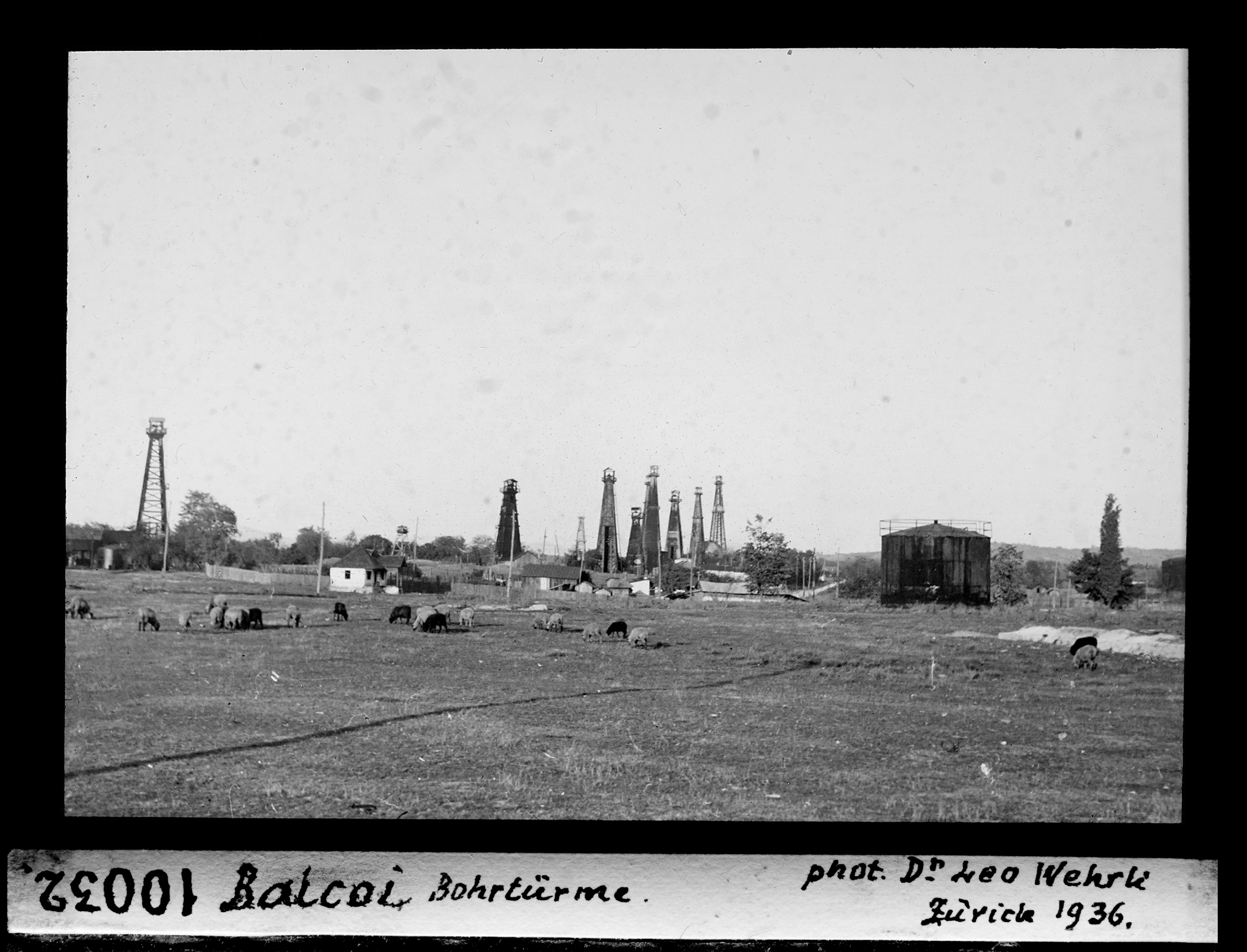
- Băicoi oilfield, 1936

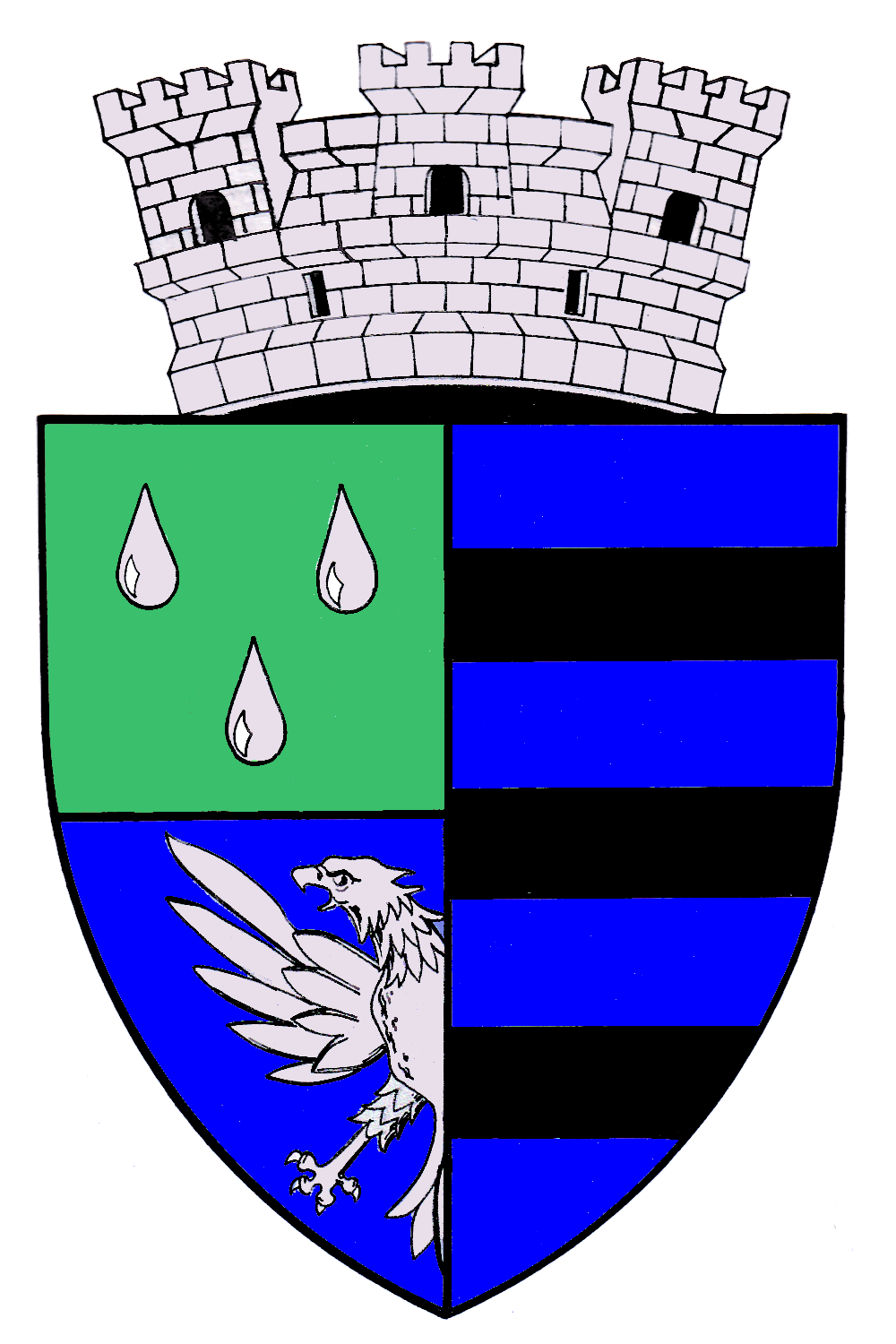
- Coat of arms

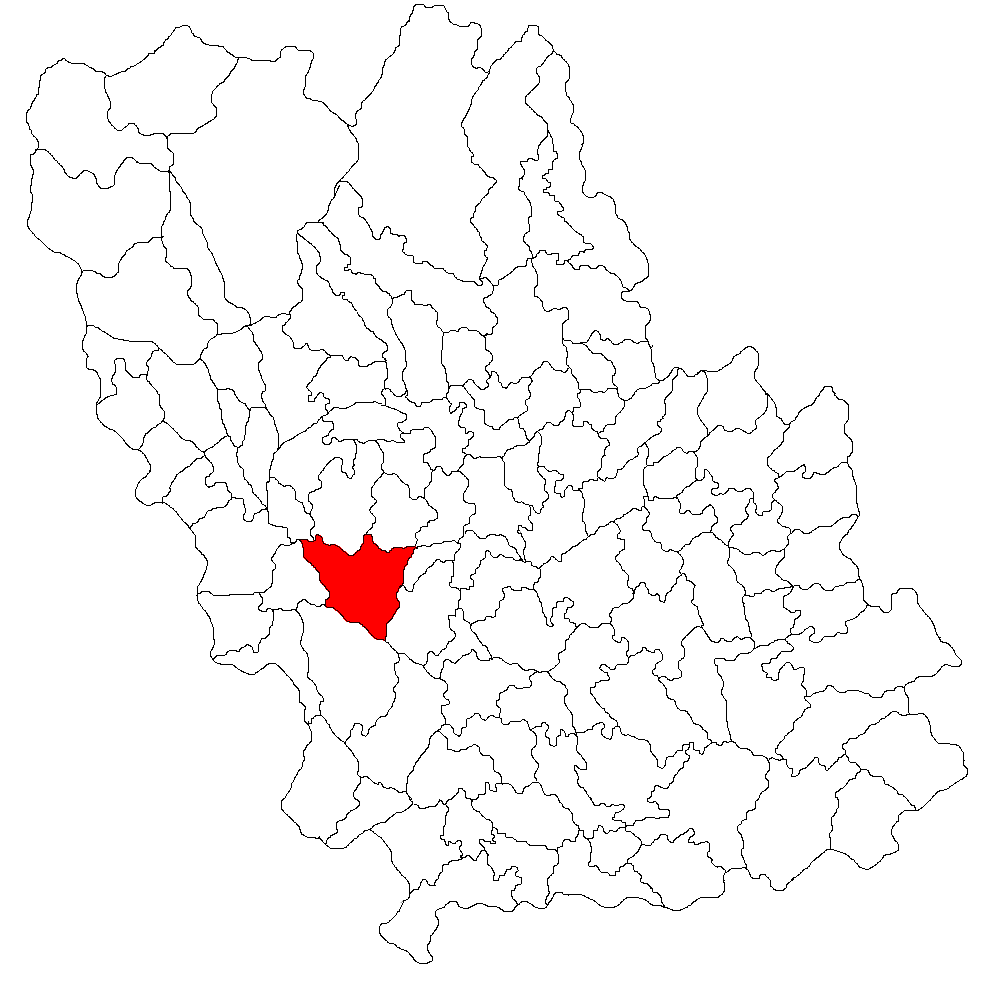
- Location in Prahova County

- Location in Romania
- Coordinates: 45°2′43″N 25°51′57″E
- Country: Romania
- County: Prahova

Government
  - Mayor (2024–2028): Marius Constantin
- Area: 65.36 km^{2} (25.24 sq mi)
- Highest elevation: 310 m (1,020 ft)
- Lowest elevation: 285 m (935 ft)
- Population (2021-12-01): 16,722
  - Density: 255.8/km^{2} (662.6/sq mi)
- Time zone: UTC+02:00 (EET)
  - Summer (DST): UTC+03:00 (EEST)
- Postal code: 105200
- Area code: (+40) 02 44
- Vehicle reg.: PH
- Website: primariabaicoi.ro

Băicoi (Romanian pronunciation: [bəjˈkoj]) is a town in Prahova County, Romania, near the 45th parallel. Five localities are administered by the town: Dâmbu, Liliești, Schela, Tufeni, and Țintea. Over time, these have become neighborhoods of the town.

Bӑicoi is located in the historical region of Muntenia. It is situated in the center of the county, and stretches for 17 km (11 mi) at its widest. The town is crossed on its southwestern side by the national road DN1, which connects it to the county seat, Ploiești, 18.7 km (11.6 mi) to the southeast and Brașov, 95.3 km (59.2 mi) to the north. Bӑicoi lies near Florești, a train stop between Ploiești and Câmpina.

== History ==
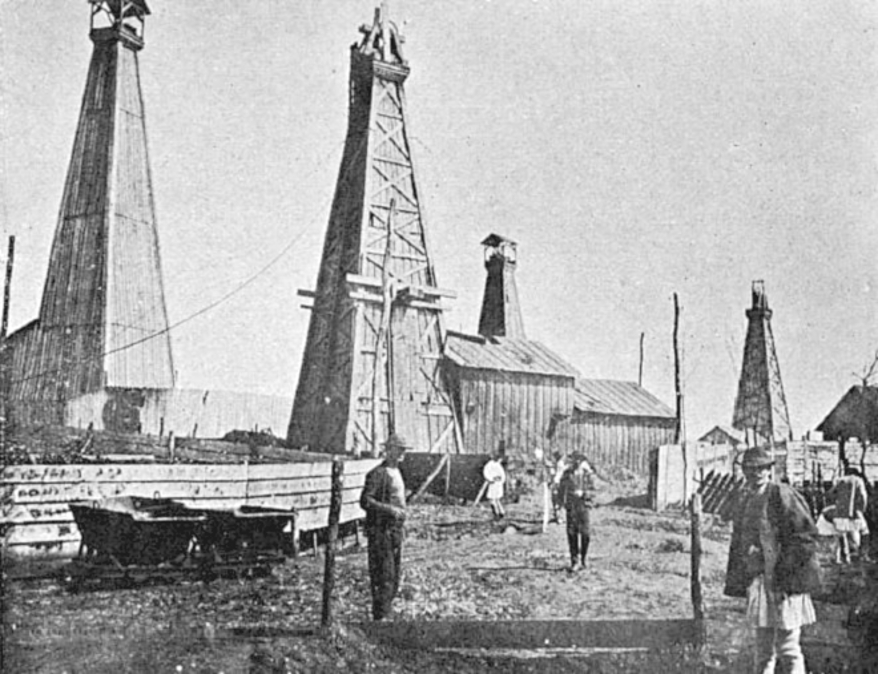
Oil derrick in Băicoi, 1907

The name of the town is derived from "Baicu". At the end of the 19th century, Băicoi was a rural commune, formed by the villages of Băicoi, Cotoiu, Tufeni, and Găgeni, totaling 3,257 inhabitants. The other localities of the current town made up the Țintea commune, which consisted of Țintea, Dâmbu, and Liliești villages, totaling 1,240 inhabitants. Both communes were part of Plasa Filipești, in Prahova County. By 1925, Băicoi commune had 5,946 inhabitants, in Băicoi, Cotoiu, and Tufeni villages (Găgeni village having been assigned to Păulești commune); Țintea commune, in the same composition, had 2,639 inhabitants.

Băicoi commune was declared a town in 1948, at the beginning of the Romanian People's Republic. After the administrative reorganization of 1950, the town became part of the Câmpina raion of Prahova Region, which was enlarged in 1952 and was renamed Ploiești Region. When the regions were abolished in 1968, Țintea commune with all its villages was assigned to the town of Băicoi, which became part of Prahova County.

Historical population
Year	Pop.	±%
1956	8,287	—
1966	9,120	+10.1%
1977	17,440	+91.2%
1992	20,681	+18.6%
2002	20,020	−3.2%
2011	17,981	−10.2%
2021	16,722	−7.0%
Source: Census data

== Natives ==
- Adina-Ioana Vălean (born 1968), politician

== Climate ==
Băicoi has a humid continental climate (Cfb in the Köppen climate classification).

Climate data for Băicoi
Month	Jan	Feb	Mar	Apr	May	Jun	Jul	Aug	Sep	Oct	Nov	Dec	Year
Mean daily maximum °C (°F)	2.5 (36.5)	5.1 (41.2)	10.1 (50.2)	15.6 (60.1)	20.6 (69.1)	24.1 (75.4)	26.3 (79.3)	26.5 (79.7)	21.3 (70.3)	15.3 (59.5)	9.6 (49.3)	4.5 (40.1)	15.1 (59.2)
Daily mean °C (°F)	−1.9 (28.6)	0.2 (32.4)	4.6 (40.3)	10.3 (50.5)	15.6 (60.1)	19.4 (66.9)	21.5 (70.7)	21.5 (70.7)	16.4 (61.5)	10.4 (50.7)	5.3 (41.5)	0.1 (32.2)	10.3 (50.5)
Mean daily minimum °C (°F)	−5.7 (21.7)	−4.1 (24.6)	−0.9 (30.4)	4.2 (39.6)	9.5 (49.1)	13.6 (56.5)	15.7 (60.3)	15.8 (60.4)	11.1 (52.0)	5.8 (42.4)	1.6 (34.9)	−3.3 (26.1)	5.3 (41.5)
Average precipitation mm (inches)	45 (1.8)	43 (1.7)	56 (2.2)	73 (2.9)	99 (3.9)	109 (4.3)	93 (3.7)	68 (2.7)	64 (2.5)	62 (2.4)	55 (2.2)	56 (2.2)	823 (32.5)
Source: https://en.climate-data.org/europe/romania/prahova/baicoi-13142/
