= Florești, Prahova =

Florești
- Commune
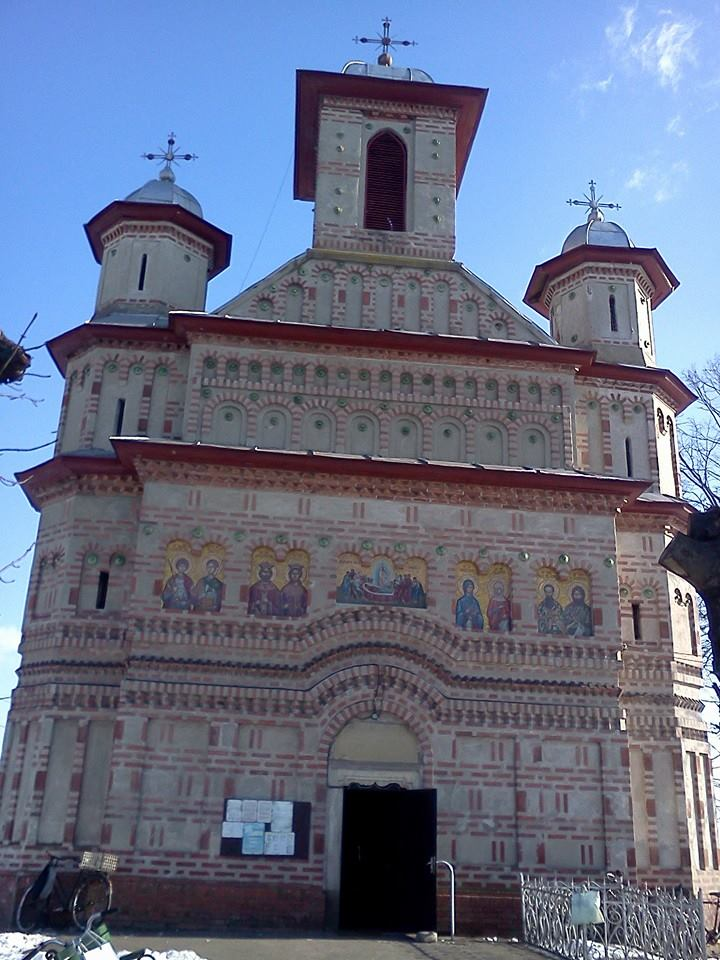
- Dormition Church in Călinești

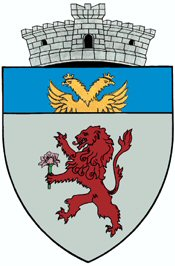
- Coat of arms

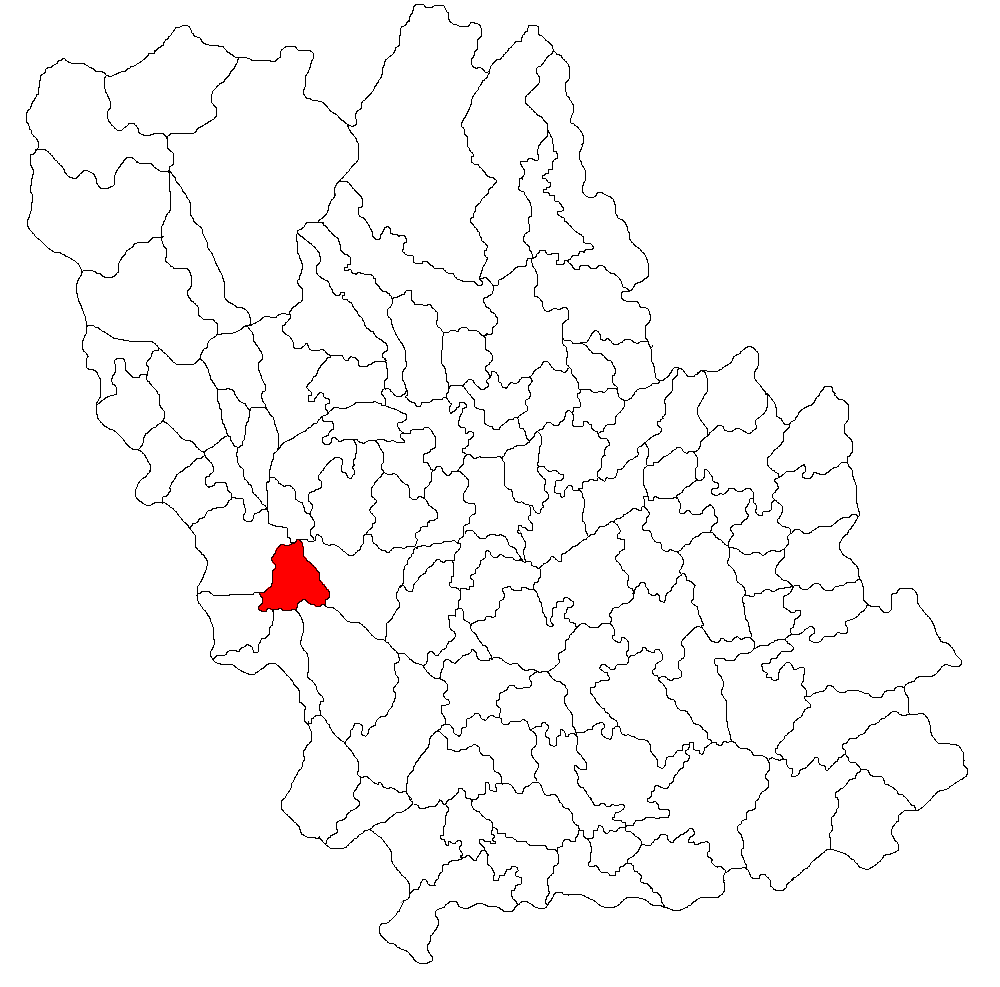
- Location in Prahova County

- Location in Romania
- Coordinates: 45°2′N 25°48′E
- Country: Romania
- County: Prahova

Government
  - Mayor (2024–2028): Simona David (PNL)
- Area: 29.63 km^{2} (11.44 sq mi)
- Elevation: 320 m (1,050 ft)
- Population (2021-12-01): 6,891
  - Density: 232.6/km^{2} (602.3/sq mi)
- Time zone: UTC+02:00 (EET)
  - Summer (DST): UTC+03:00 (EEST)
- Postal code: 107255
- Area code: +(40) 244
- Vehicle reg.: PH
- Website: florestiprahova.ro

Florești is a commune in Prahova County, Muntenia, Romania. It is composed of five villages: Cap Roșu, Călinești, Cătina, Florești, and Novăcești.

The commune is located in the western part of the county, on the banks of the Prahova River. The DN1 road passes just east of the commune; it connects Florești to the county seat, Ploiești (22 km (14 mi) to the southeast), and to Brașov (90 km (56 mi) to the north). On the western side of the commune is the Florești railway station, serving the Căile Ferate Române Line 300 that runs from Bucharest to Ploiești, Brașov, and on to the Hungarian border.

Its neighbors are Măgureni commune to the north, Filipeștii de Pădure commune to the west, the town of Băicoi to the east, and Ariceștii Rahtivani commune to the south.

Historical population
Year	Pop.	±%
1992	7,759	—
2002	7,634	−1.6%
2011	6,993	−8.4%
2021	6,891	−1.5%
Source: Census data

== Notable people ==
- Teodor Vârnav (1801–1868), writer and translator
