= Gherghița =

- Commune
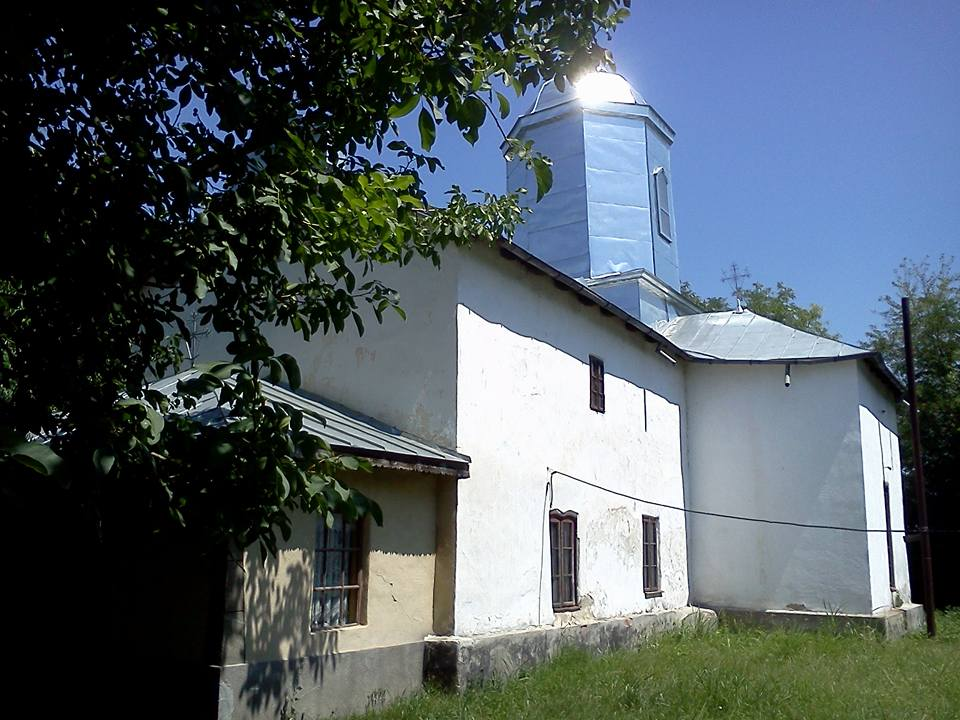
- Saint Demeter Church in Gherghița

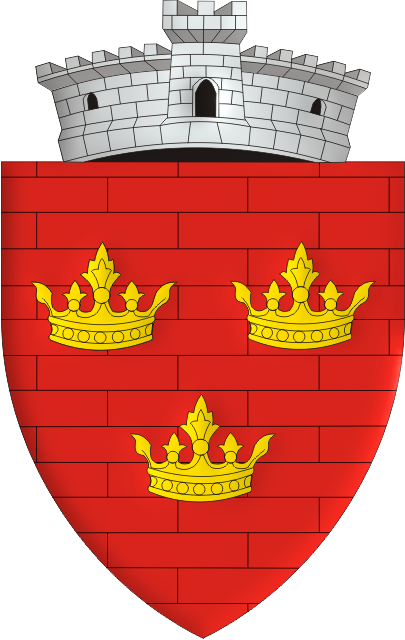
- Coat of arms

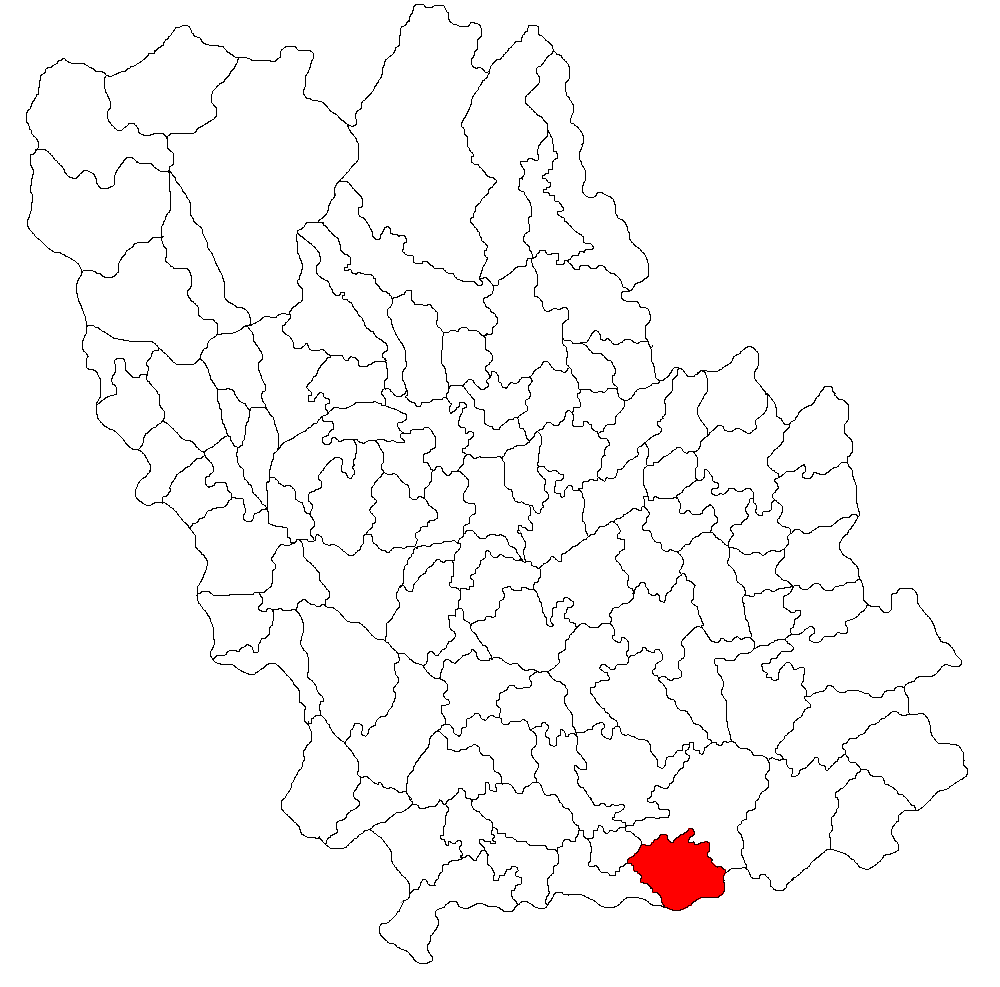
- Location in Prahova County

- Location in Romania
- Coordinates: 44°48′N 26°16′E
- Country: Romania
- County: Prahova

Government
  - Mayor (2020–2024): Mihail Nichita (PSD)
- Area: 25.6 km^{2} (9.9 sq mi)
- Elevation: 80 m (260 ft)
- Population (2021-12-01): 1,918
  - Density: 74.9/km^{2} (194/sq mi)
- Time zone: UTC+02:00 (EET)
  - Summer (DST): UTC+03:00 (EEST)
- Postal code: 107265
- Area code: +(40) 244
- Vehicle reg.: PH
- Website: primariacomuneigherghita.ro

Gherghița is a commune in Prahova County, Muntenia, Romania. It is composed of four villages: Gherghița, Independența, Malamuc, and Ungureni. It also included Fânari, Olari and Olarii Vechi villages until 2004, when they were split off to form Olari Commune.

Historical population
Year	Pop.	±%
2002	1,955	—
2011	1,977	+1.1%
2021	1,918	−3.0%
Source: Census data
