= Filipeștii de Târg =

- Commune
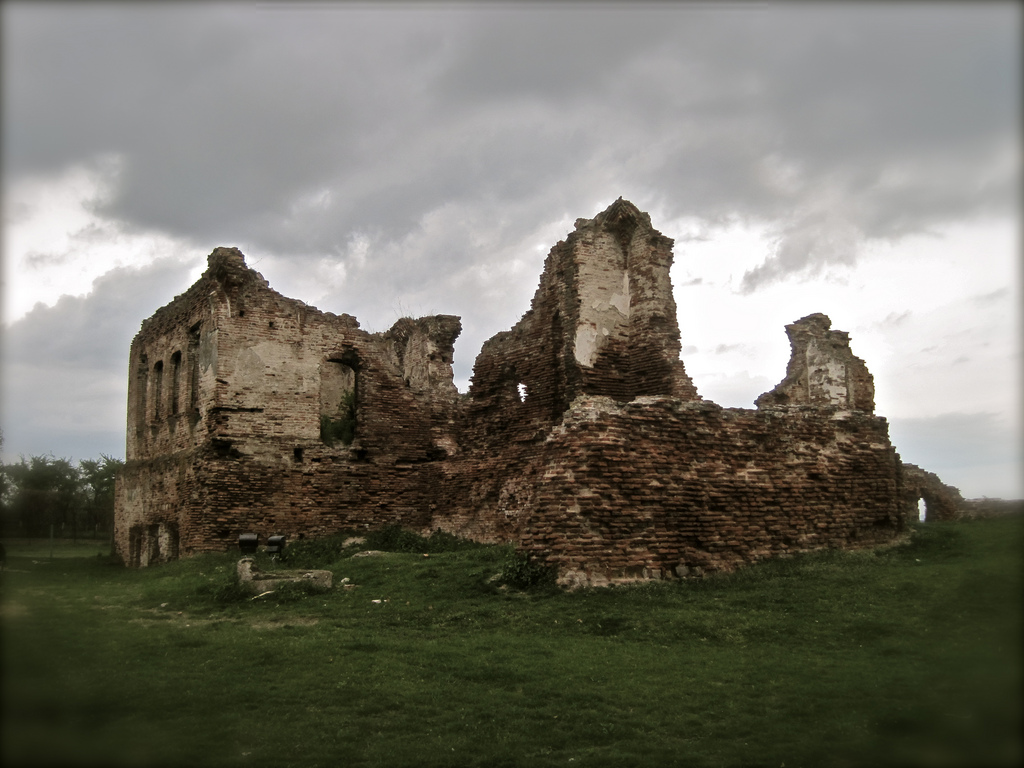
- Ruins of seneschal Constantin Cantacuzino's palace in Filipeștii de Târg

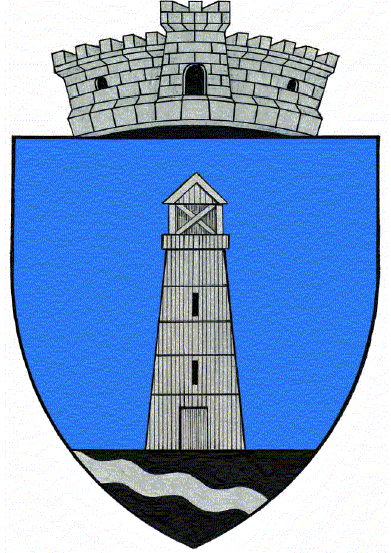
- Coat of arms

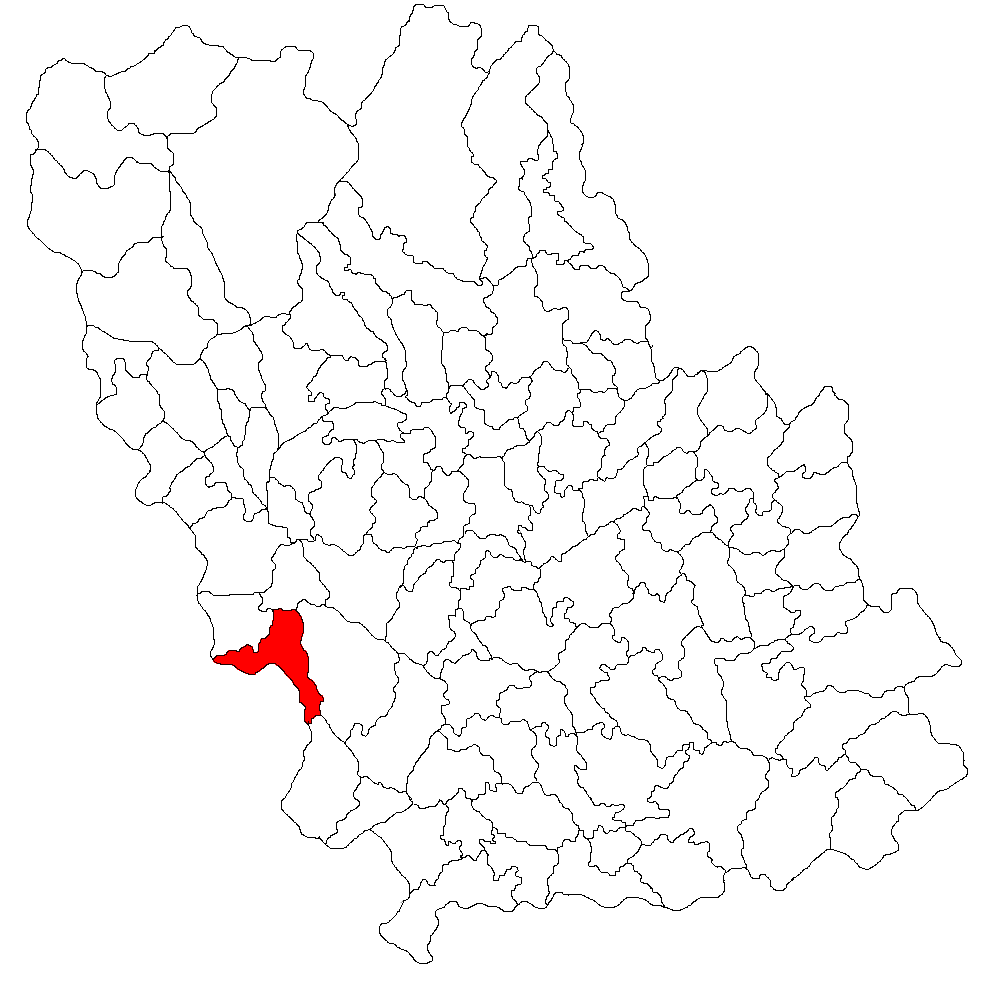
- Location in Prahova County

- Location in Romania
- Coordinates: 44°59′N 25°47′E
- Country: Romania
- County: Prahova

Government
  - Mayor (2020–2024): Aurelian Manole (PNL)
- Area: 35.26 km^{2} (13.61 sq mi)
- Elevation: 270 m (890 ft)
- Population (2021-12-01): 7,450
  - Density: 211/km^{2} (547/sq mi)
- Time zone: UTC+02:00 (EET)
  - Summer (DST): UTC+03:00 (EEST)
- Postal code: 107250
- Area code: +(40) 244
- Vehicle reg.: PH
- Website: www.primariafilipestiidetarg.ro

Filipeștii de Târg is a commune in Prahova County, Muntenia, Romania. It is composed of three villages: Brătășanca, Filipeștii de Târg, and Mărginenii de Jos. The locality was a town until 1950.

The commune is situated towards the northern edge of the Wallachian Plain, at an altitude of 270 m (890 ft), on the right bank of the Prahova River. It is located in the western part of Prahova County, 20 km (12 mi) west of the county seat, Ploiești, on the border with Dâmbovița County.

On its southern side, Filipeștii de Târg is crossed by national road DN72, which connects Ploiești to Târgoviște. The Brătășanca halt serves the CFR Ploiești–Târgoviște railway.

Historical population
Year	Pop.	±%
2002	7,931	—
2011	7,689	−3.1%
2021	7,450	−3.1%
Source: Census data

== Natives ==
- Nicolae Constantin (born 1973), football manager and former player
