= Sălciile =

- Commune
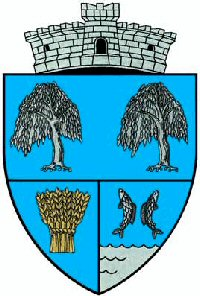
- Coat of arms

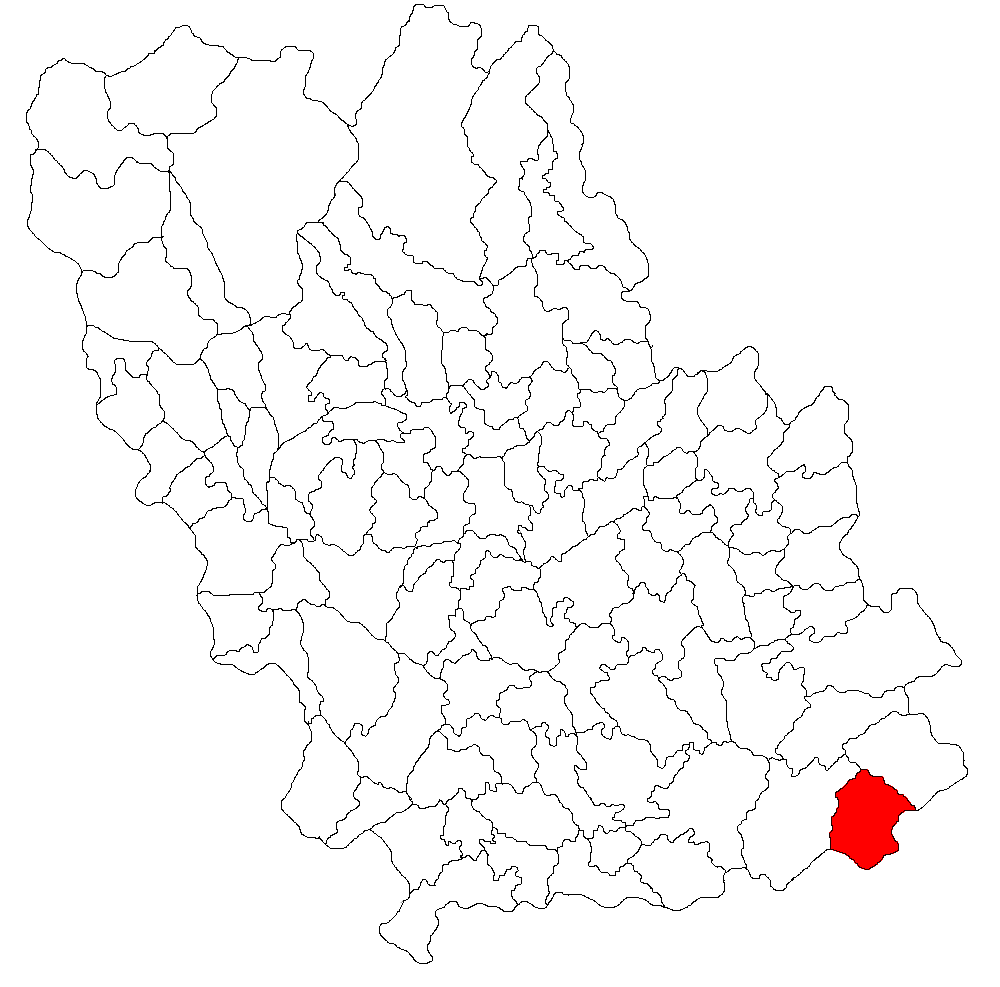
- Location in Prahova County

- Location in Romania
- Coordinates: 44.8267°N 26.494°E
- Country: Romania
- County: Prahova

Government
  - Mayor (2020–2024): Nistor Stan (PSD)
- Area: 39.80 km^{2} (15.37 sq mi)
- Elevation: 70 m (230 ft)
- Population (2021-12-01): 1,657
  - Density: 42/km^{2} (110/sq mi)
- Time zone: EET/EEST (UTC+2/+3)
- Postal code: 107510
- Area code: +(40) 244
- Vehicle reg.: PH
- Website: primariasalciile.ro

Sălciile is a commune in Prahova County, Muntenia, Romania. It is composed of a single village, Sălciile.

Historical population
Year	Pop.	±%
1992	2,563	—
2002	2,324	−9.3%
2011	1,945	−16.3%
2021	1,657	−14.8%
Source: Census data
