= Drăgănești, Prahova =

Drăgănești
- Commune
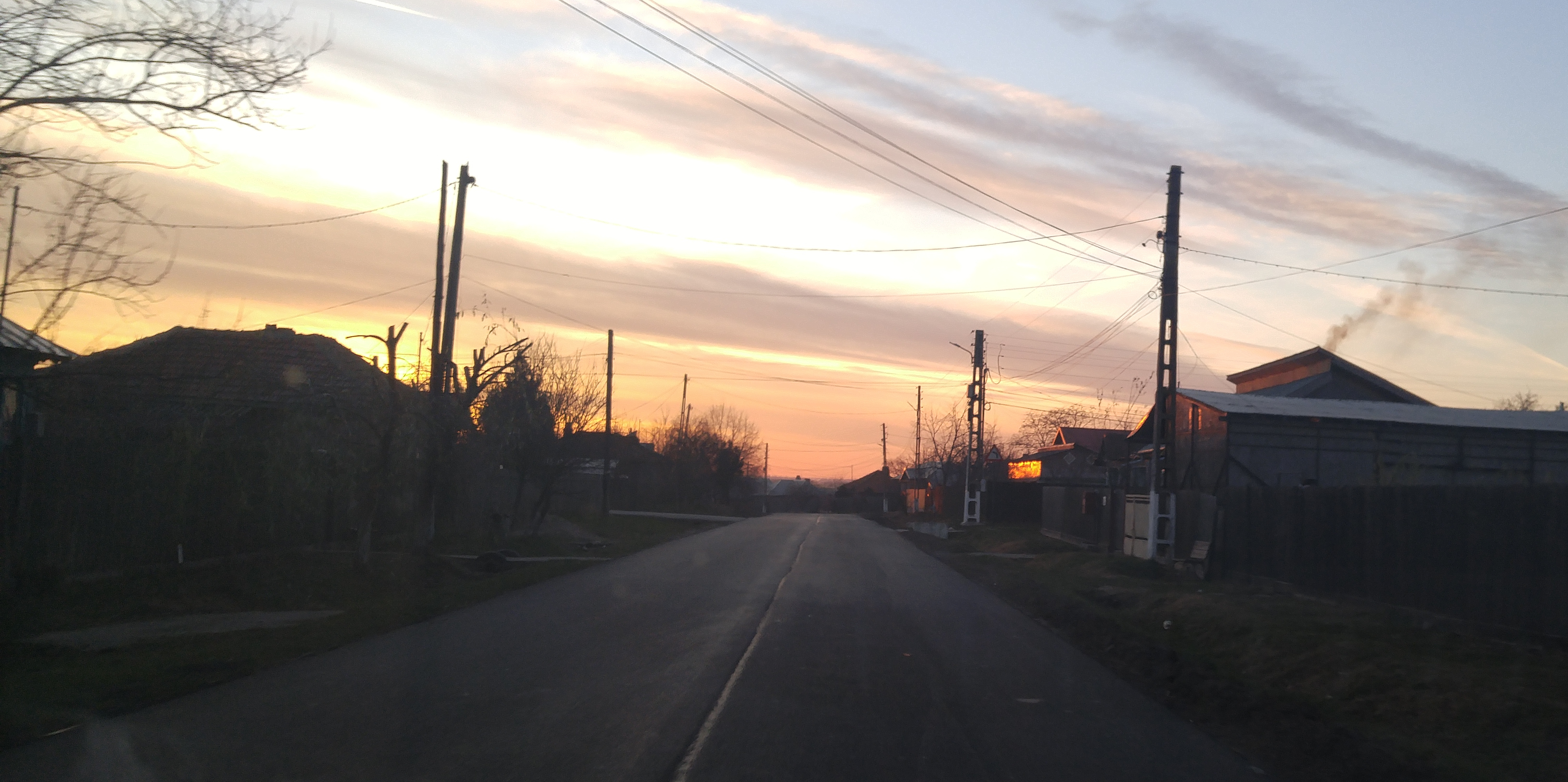
- County road DJ100B in Bărăitaru

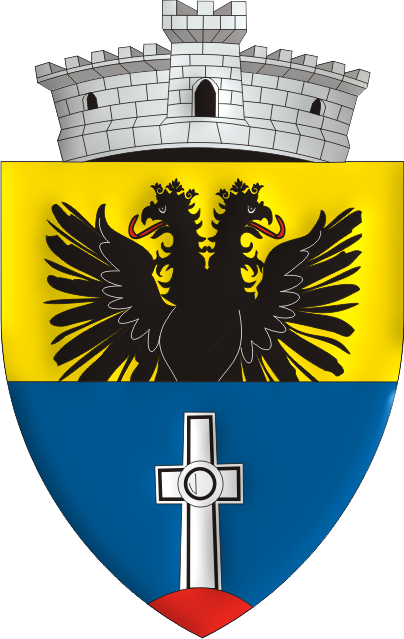
- Coat of arms

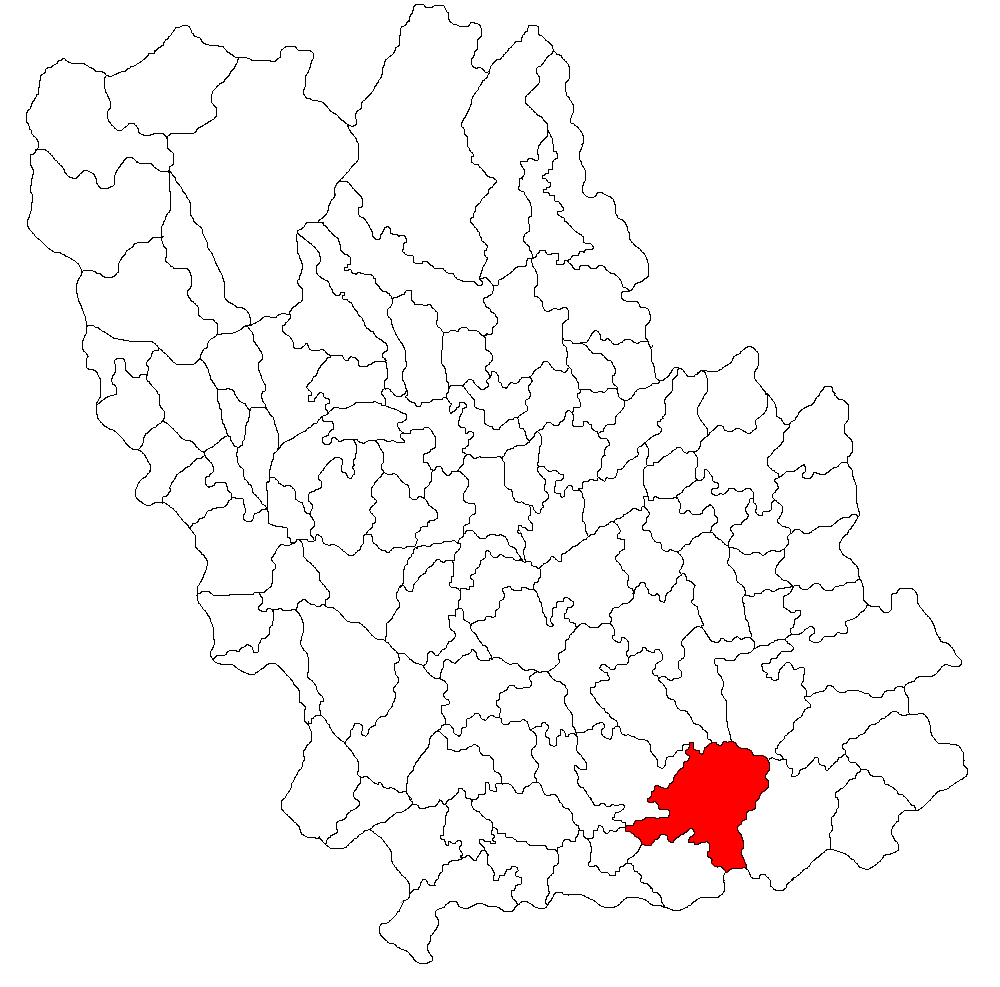
- Location in Prahova County

- Location in Romania
- Coordinates: 44°50′N 26°18′E
- Country: Romania
- County: Prahova

Government
  - Mayor (2024–2028): Ionuț Georgian Toma (PSD)
- Area: 87.56 km^{2} (33.81 sq mi)
- Elevation: 77 m (253 ft)
- Population (2021-12-01): 4,432
  - Density: 50.62/km^{2} (131.1/sq mi)
- Time zone: UTC+02:00 (EET)
  - Summer (DST): UTC+03:00 (EEST)
- Postal code: 107120
- Area code: +(40) 244
- Vehicle reg.: PH
- Website: primariadraganesti.ro

Drăgănești is a commune in Prahova County, Muntenia, Romania. It is composed of seven villages: Bărăitaru, Belciug, Cornu de Jos, Drăgănești, Hătcărău, Meri, and Tufani.

Historical population
Year	Pop.	±%
1992	5,295	—
2002	5,238	−1.1%
2011	4,941	−5.7%
2021	4,432	−10.3%
Source: Census data
