= Prahova County =

County of Romania

Prahova County Județul Prahova
- County
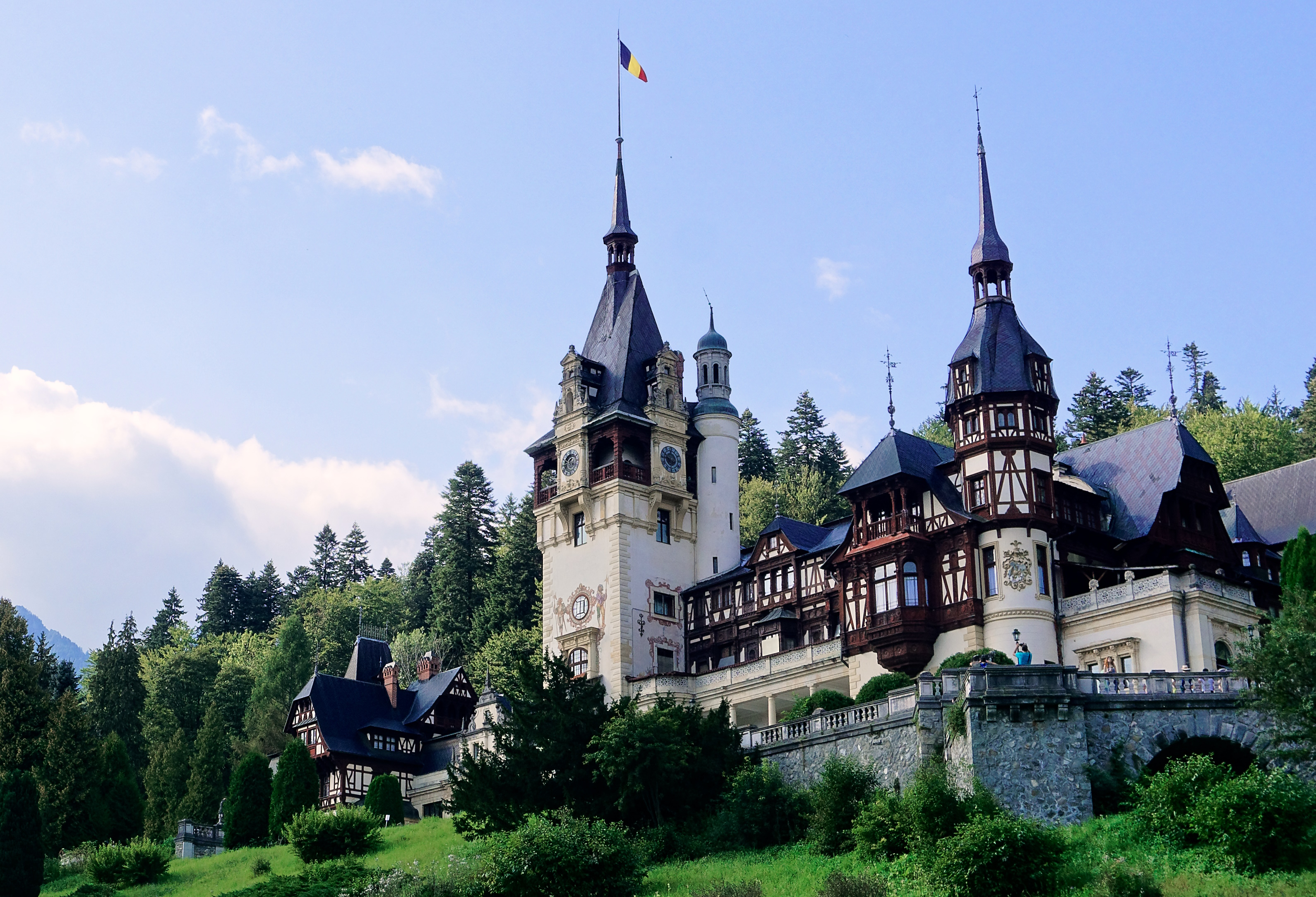
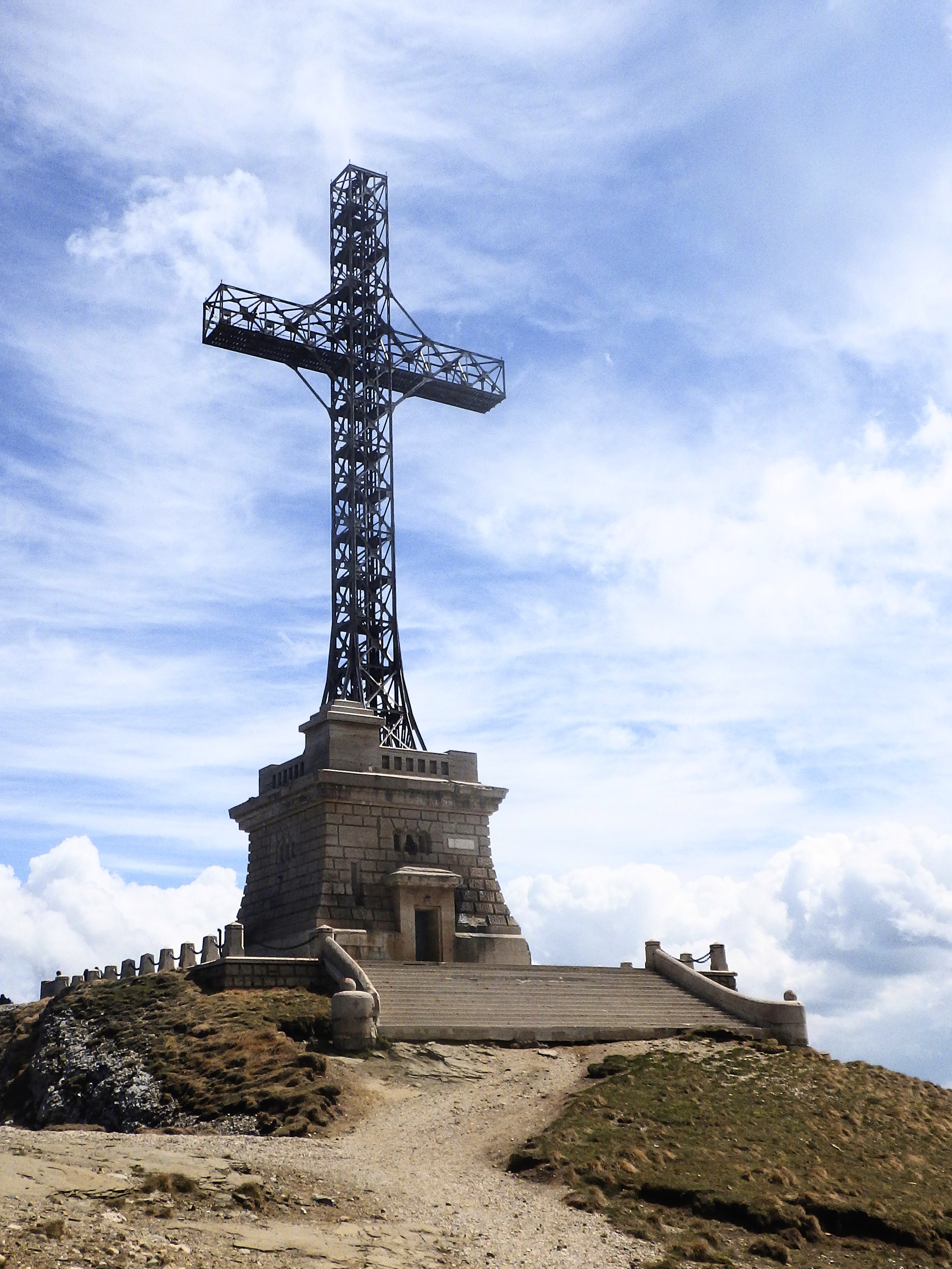
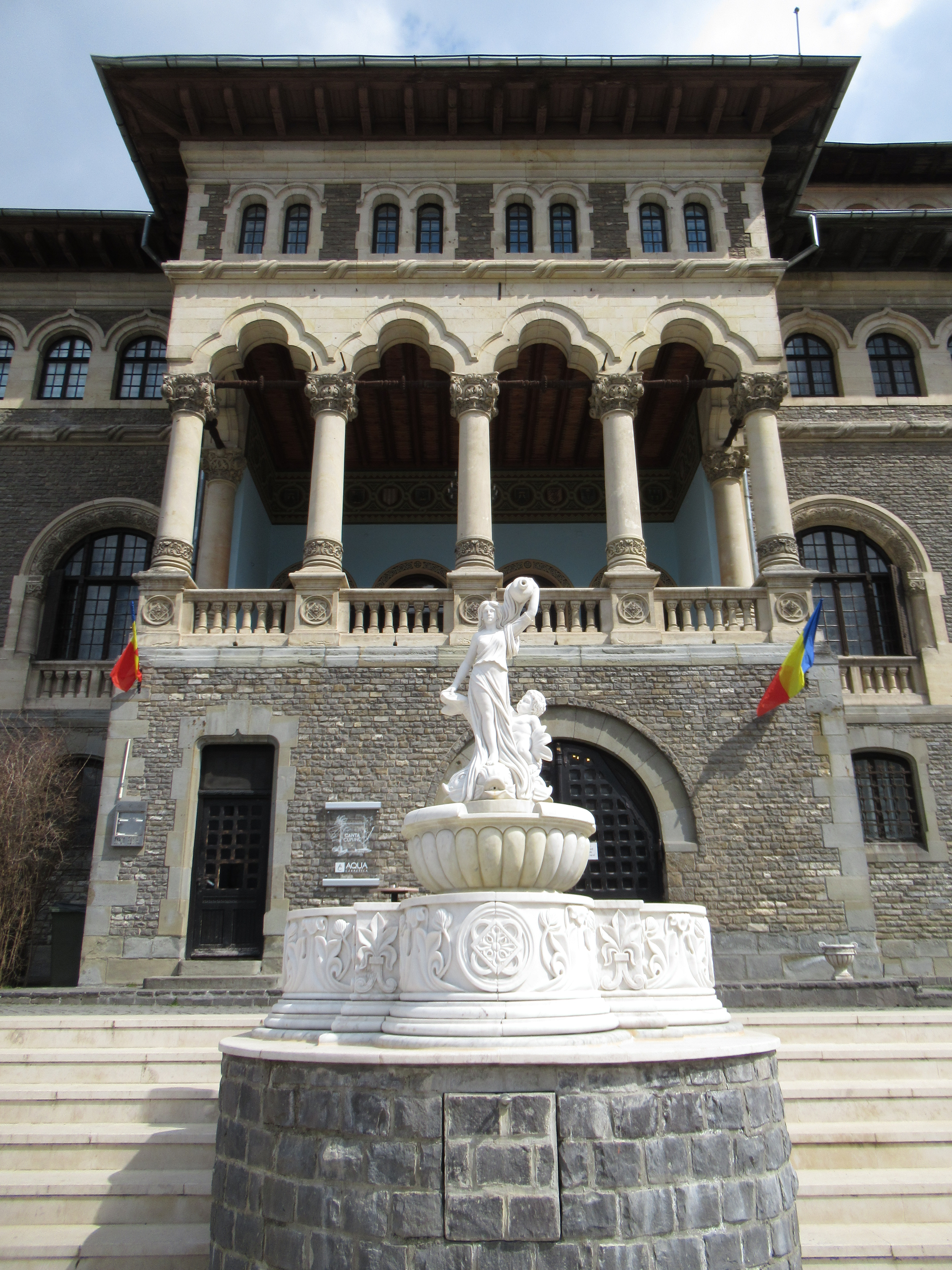
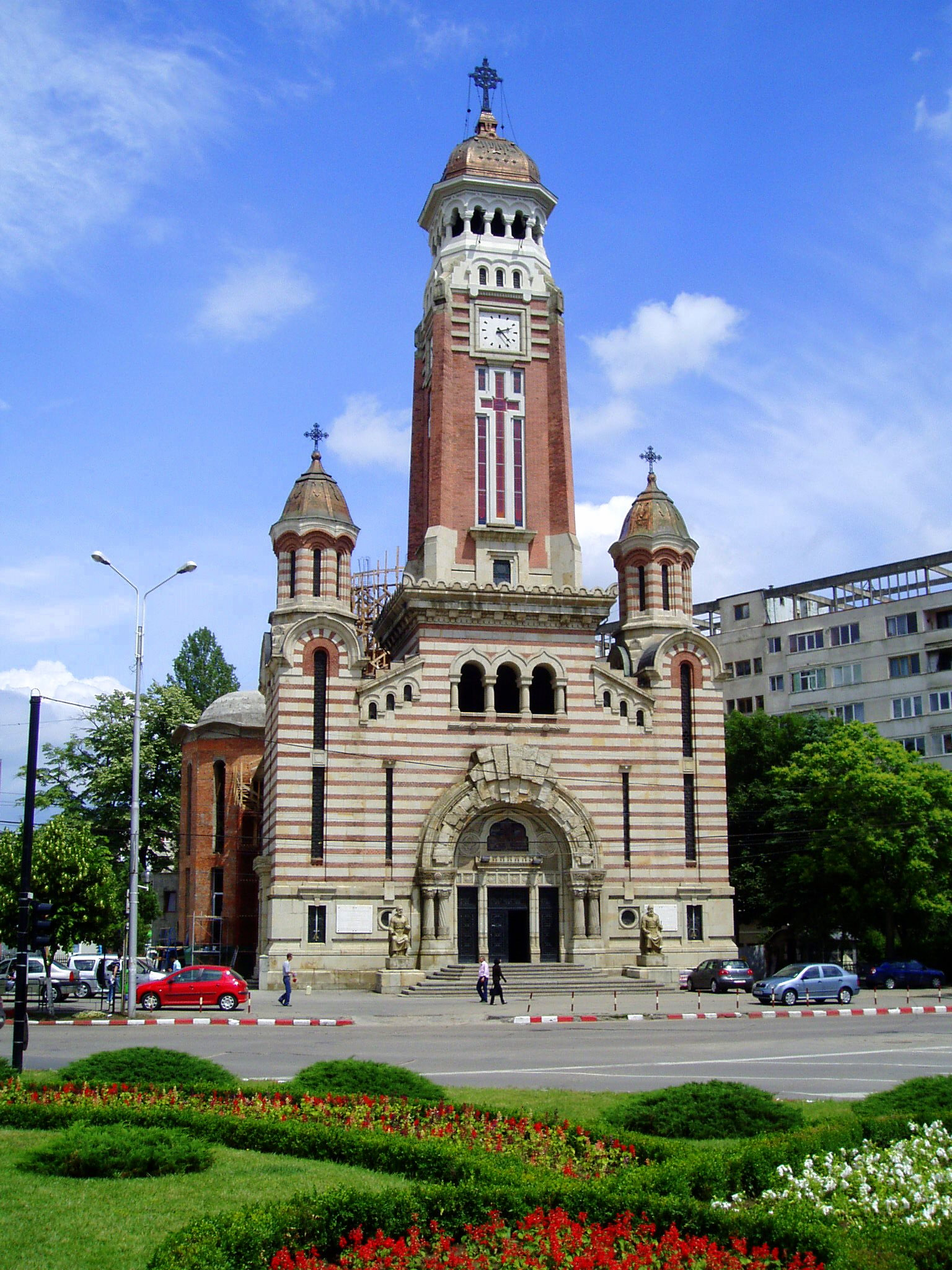
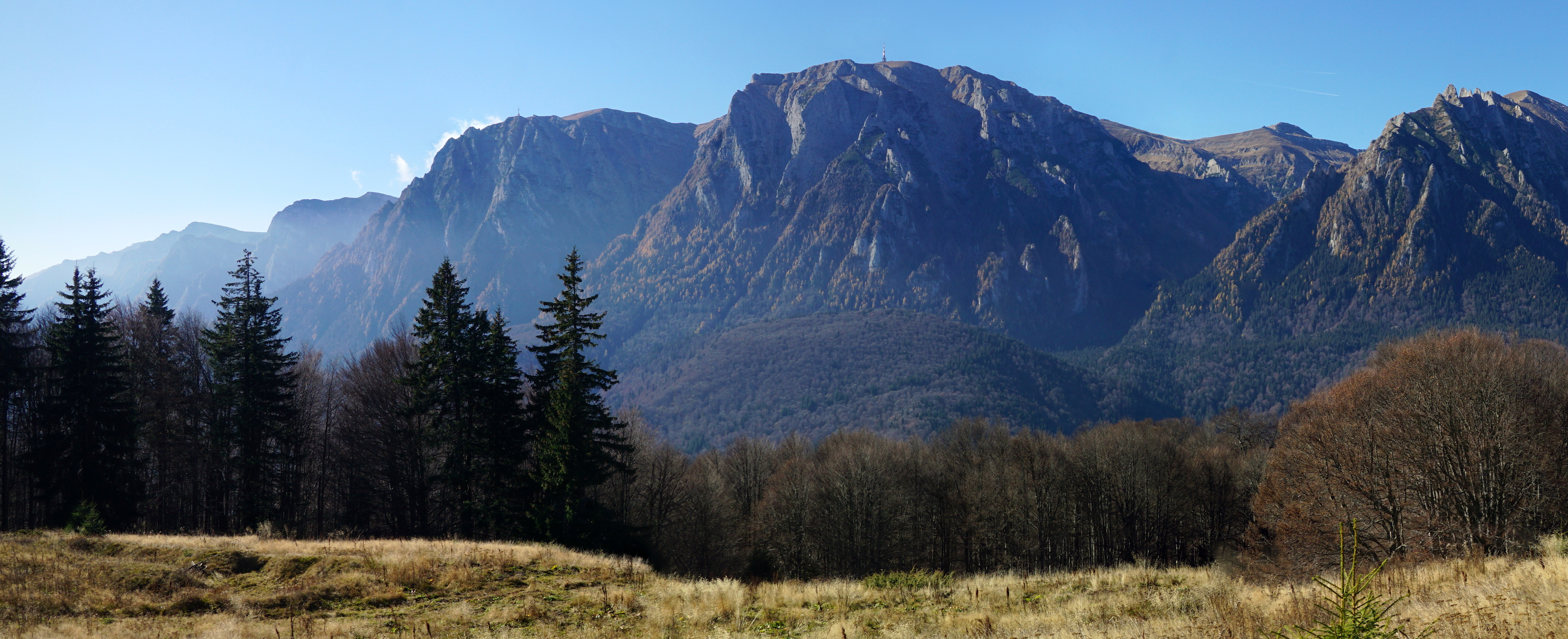
- Peleș Castle Cross on Caraiman Cantacuzino Castle Ploiești Bucegi Mountains

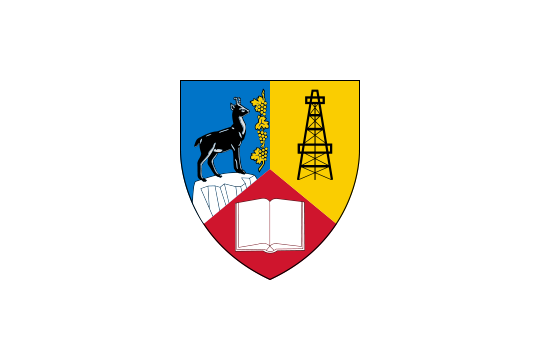
- Flag Coat of arms

- Coordinates: 45.1°N 26.02°E
- Country: Romania
- Development region: Sud
- Historical region: Muntenia
- Capital: Ploiești

Government
  - President of the County Board: Virgiliu Daniel Nanu (PSD)
  - Prefect: Emil Drăgănescu

Area
  - Total: 4,716 km^{2} (1,821 sq mi)
  - Rank: 33rd

Population (2021-12-01)
  - Total: 695,119
  - Rank: 3rd
  - Density: 147.4/km^{2} (381.8/sq mi)
- Telephone code: (+40) 244 or (+40) 344
- ISO 3166 code: RO-PH
- GDP (nominal): US$ 7.012 billion (2015)
- GDP per capita: US$ 9,191 (2015)
- Website: County Council; Prefecture

Prahova County (Romanian pronunciation: [ˈprahova]) is a county (județ) of Romania, in the historical region Muntenia, with the capital city at Ploiești.

== Demographics ==
In 2011, it had a population of 762,886 and the population density was 161/km^{2}. It is Romania's third most populated county (after the Municipality of Bucharest and Iași County), having a population density double that of the country's mean.

- Romanians - 97.74%
- Romas and others - 2.26%

Year	County population
1948	557,776
1956	623,817 ▲ (1.41%)
1966	701,057 ▲ (1.17%)
1977	817,168 ▲ (1.40%)
1992	873,229 ▲ (0.44%)
2002	829,945 ▼ (−0.51%)
2011	762,886 ▼ (−0.93%)
2021	695,119 ▼ (−0.93%)

The county received an inflow of population who have moved here due to the industrial development.

== Geography ==
This county has a total area of 4,716 km^{2}.

The relief is split in approximately equal parts between the mountains, the hills and the plain. In the North side there are mountains from the southern end of the Eastern Carpathians - the Curvature Carpathians group; and the Bucegi Mountains the Eastern end of the Southern Carpathians group. The two groups are separated by the Prahova River Valley.

The south side of the county is a plain, on the North West side of the Romanian Plain.

The main river is the eponymous Prahova River. It flows from the mountains, through the Prahova Valley collecting many other rivers - the Doftana River, the Teleajen River and others.

=== Neighbours ===
- Buzău County in the East.
- Dâmbovița County in the West.
- Brașov County in the North.
- Ialomița County and Ilfov County in the South.

== Economy ==
The area contains the main oil reserves in Romania, with a longstanding tradition in extracting and refining the oil. The county is heavily industrialised, with over 115,000 residents working in industrial environments. It contributes to over 8% of the country's industrial production. Some of the biggest international corporations like Coca-Cola, Unilever, InBev, Johnson Controls, Cameron, Weatherford, Michelin, Timken and others have invested heavily in the recent years.

The predominant industries in the county are:

- Oil industry - almost 50% of the county's industrial production.
- Oil extracting equipment.
- Chemical industry.
- Rubber industry.
- Mechanical components industry.
- Food and beverages industry.
- Textile industry.

Agriculture is also developed — in the southern part mainly extensive agriculture and the hills area is well suited for wines and fruit orchards. In total it realises about 3% of the country's agricultural production.

== Tourism ==
The Prahova Valley is one of the areas with the highest tourist potential in the country having one of the best tourism facilities in Romania.

The main tourist destinations are:

- On the Prahova Valley:
  - The Sinaia Resort.
  - The Bușteni Resort.
  - The Azuga Resort.
  - The Bucegi Mountains.
- On the Teleajen River Valley:
  - The Vălenii de Munte Resort.
  - Cheia.
  - Slănic.
  - The Zăganul Mountains
  - The Ciucaș Mountains.
- On the Doftana River Valley:
  - The Telega Resort.
  - Valea Doftanei.
  - The Gârbova Mountains.
- The city of Ploiești.
- The city of Câmpina.

== Politics ==
The Prahova County Council, renewed at the 2020 local elections, consists of 36 counsellors, with the following party composition:

Party	Seats	Current County Council
PNL-USR PLUS Alliance	20	
Alliance For Prahova (PSD)	11	
People's Movement Party (PMP)	3	
Prahova In Action Party	2	

== Administrative divisions ==
Prahova County has 2 municipalities, 12 towns and 90 communes

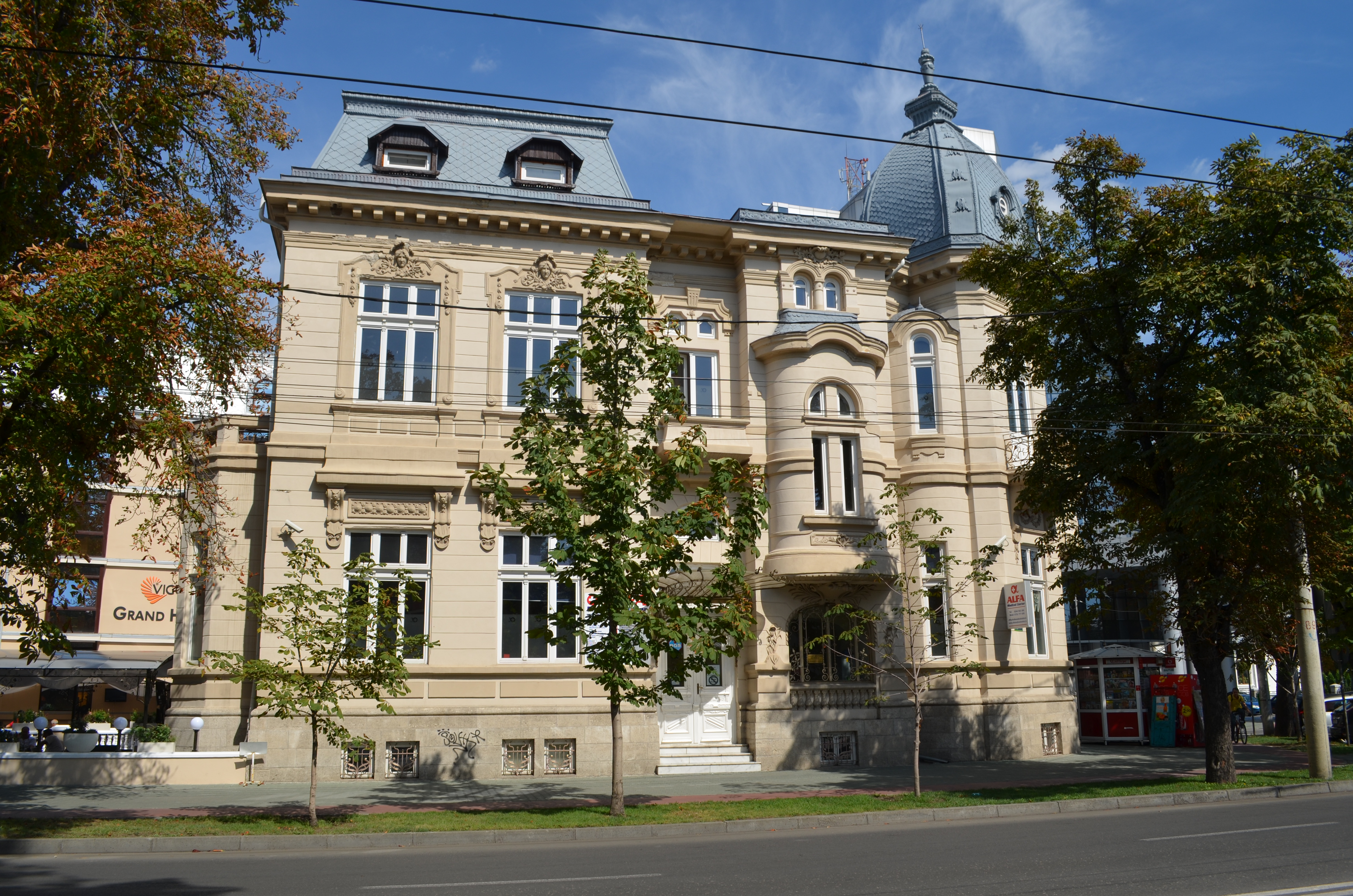
Ploiești

Municipalities

- Câmpina - population: 32,935 (as of 2011)
- Ploiești - capital city; population: 209,945 (as of 2011)

Towns

- Azuga
- Băicoi
- Boldești-Scăeni
- Breaza
- Bușteni
- Comarnic
- Mizil
- Plopeni
- Sinaia
- Slănic
- Urlați
- Vălenii de Munte

Communes

- Adunați
- Albești-Paleologu
- Aluniș
- Apostolache
- Ariceștii Rahtivani
- Ariceștii Zeletin
- Baba Ana
- Balta Doamnei
- Bălțești
- Bănești
- Bărcănești
- Bătrâni
- Berceni
- Bertea
- Blejoi
- Boldești-Grădiștea
- Brazi
- Brebu
- Bucov
- Călugăreni
- Cărbunești
- Ceptura
- Cerașu
- Chiojdeanca
- Ciorani
- Cocorăștii Mislii
- Cocorăștii Colț
- Colceag
- Cornu
- Cosminele
- Drăgănești
- Drajna
- Dumbrava
- Dumbrăvești
- Filipeștii de Pădure
- Filipeștii de Târg
- Fântânele
- Florești
- Fulga
- Gherghița
- Gorgota
- Gornet
- Gornet-Cricov
- Gura Vadului
- Gura Vitioarei
- Iordăcheanu
- Izvoarele
- Jugureni
- Lapoș
- Lipănești
- Măgurele
- Măgureni
- Măneciu
- Mănești
- Olari
- Păcureți
- Păulești
- Plopu
- Podenii Noi
- Poiana Câmpina
- Poienarii Burchii
- Posești
- Predeal-Sărari
- Provița de Jos
- Provița de Sus
- Puchenii Mari
- Râfov
- Salcia
- Sălciile
- Scorțeni
- Secăria
- Sângeru
- Șirna
- Șoimari
- Șotrile
- Starchiojd
- Ștefești
- Surani
- Talea
- Tătaru
- Teișani
- Telega
- Tinosu
- Târgșoru Vechi
- Tomșani
- Vadu Săpat
- Valea Călugărească
- Valea Doftanei
- Vărbilău
- Vâlcănești

== Historical county ==
Județul Prahova
- County (Județ)
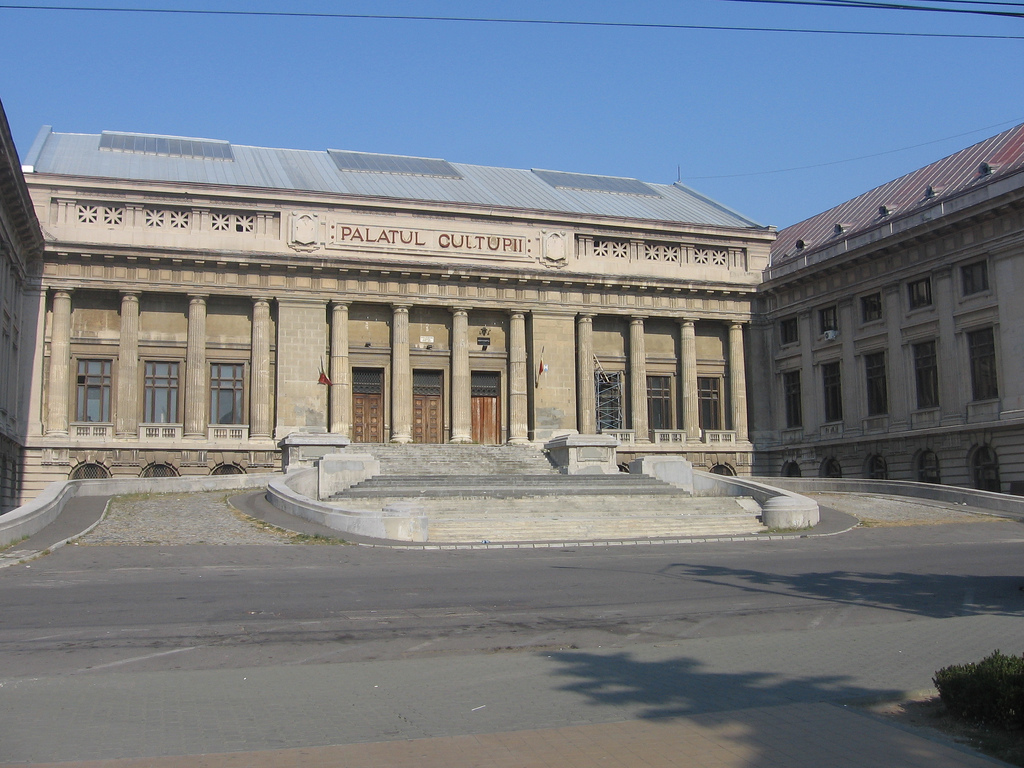
- The building of the Prahova County court from the interwar period, now the Ploiești Palace of Culture.

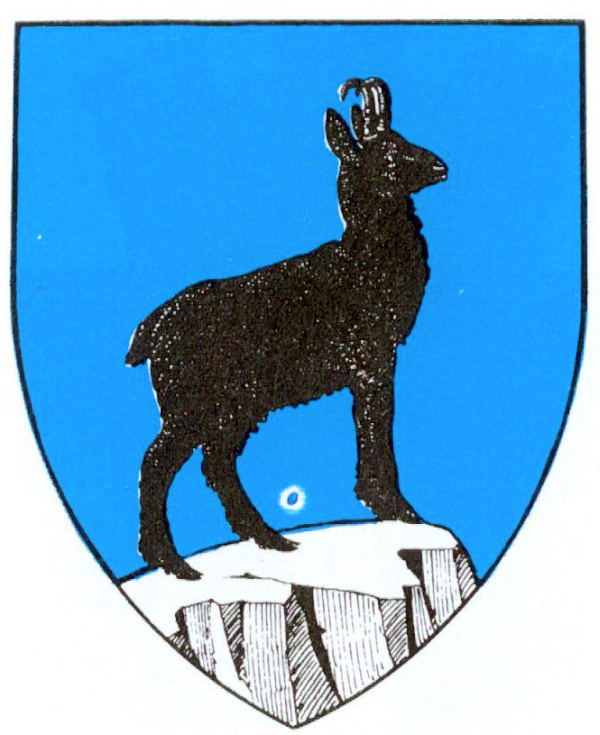
- Coat of arms

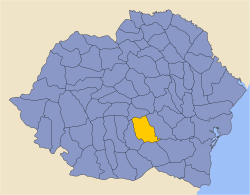
- Country: Romania
- Historic region: Muntenia
- Capital city (Reședință de județ): Ploiești, then spelt Ploești

Area
  - Total: 5,040 km^{2} (1,950 sq mi)

Population (1930)
  - Total: 477,750
  - Density: 94.8/km^{2} (246/sq mi)
- Time zone: UTC+2 (EET)
  - Summer (DST): UTC+3 (EEST)

Historically, the county was located in the south central part of Greater Romania, in the central part of the historical region of Muntenia. Its capital was Ploiești (then spelt Ploești). The interwar county territory comprised a large part of the current Prahova County, except the town of Mizil and several nearby villages that were then in Buzău County. In addition to the current county's territory, the interwar county contained several communes in its western part (including Dărmănești, I.L. Caragiale, and Moreni), currently in Dâmbovița County, and some territory northwest of Predeal, now in Brașov County.

=== Administration ===
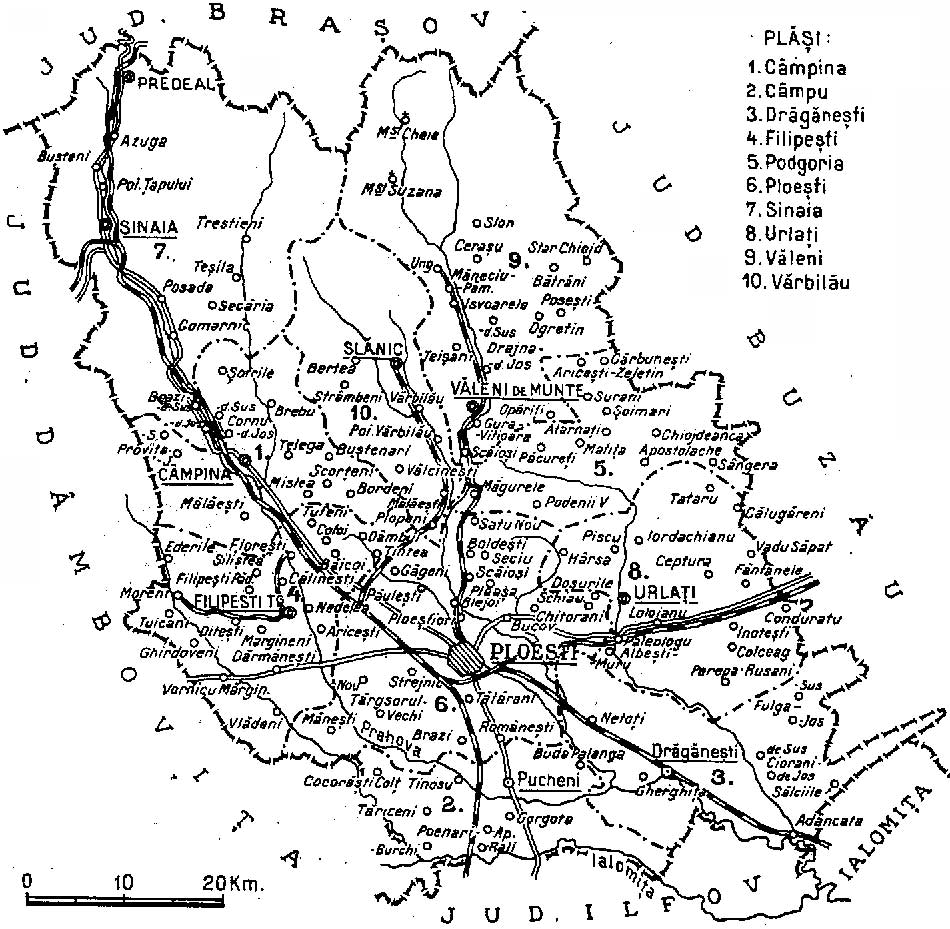
Map of Prahova County as constituted in 1938.

The county was originally divided into seven administrative districts (plăși):

1. Plasa Câmpina, headquartered at Câmpina
2. Plasa Drăgănești, headquartered at Drăgănești
3. Plasa Filipești, headquartered at Filipești
4. Plasa Ploiești, headquartered at Ploești
5. Plasa Sinaia, headquartered at Sinaia
6. Plasa Urlați, headquartered at Urlați
7. Plasa Văleni, headquartered at Văleni

Subsequently, the county established three more districts:

8. Plasa Câmpu, headquartered at Câmpu
9. Plasa Podgoria, headquartered at Podgoria
10. Plasa Vărbilău, headquartered at Vărbilău

=== Population ===
According to the 1930 census data, the county population was 477,750 inhabitants, ethnically divided as follows: 95.0% Romanians, 1.5% Gypsies, 0.9% Jews, 0.8% Hungarians, 0.7% Germans, as well as other minorities. From the religious point of view, the population was 96.0% Eastern Orthodox, 1.2% Roman Catholic, 1.0% Jewish, 0.6% Lutherans, 0.5% Greek Catholic, as well as other minorities.

==== Urban population ====
In 1930, the county's urban population was 105,098 inhabitants, comprising 88.8% Romanians, 3.5% Jews, 1.9% Hungarians, 1.7% Germans, 1.4% Romanies, as well as other minorities. From the religious point of view, the urban population was composed of 89.2% Eastern Orthodox, 3.6% Jewish, 3.3% Roman Catholic, 1.5% Lutheran, 1.3% Greek Catholic, 0.6% Reformed, as well as other minorities.

== See also ==
- Prahova River
- Prahova Valley
