= Provița =

Provița may refer to the following places in Romania:

- Provița de Jos, a commune in Prahova County
- Provița de Sus, a commune in Prahova County
- Provița (river), a tributary of the Cricovul Dulce in Prahova and Dâmbovița Counties
