= Nicolae Vermont =

Romanian realist painter, graphic artist and muralist

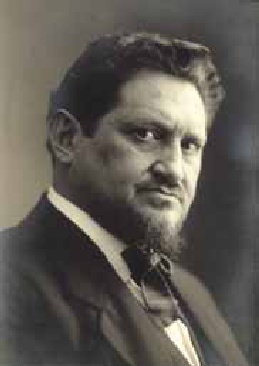
- Born: Isidor Grünberg; October 10, 1866; Bacău, Romania
- Died: June 14, 1932 (aged 65); Bucharest, Romania
- Education: Theodor Aman
- Known for: painting, drawing, mural
- Movement: Tinerimea Artistică; Realism
- Patrons: Alexandru Bogdan-Pitești

Nicolae Vermont (10 October 1866 – 14 June 1932) was a Romanian realist painter, graphic artist and muralist. He was noted for his wide range of subjects and his interest in social issues, and was an associate of the post-Impressionists Ștefan Luchian and Constantin Artachino, as well as a friend of the controversial art collector and political figure Alexandru Bogdan-Pitești.

== Biography ==
Vermont was born Isidor Grünberg to a Jewish family in Bacău. His father, Iosif Grünberg, was a professor. Isidor adopted his father's pseudonym "Vermont" (the name being a gallicization of Grünberg — literally, "green mountain") and, upon converting to the Romanian Orthodox Church, took the first name Nicolae.

He began his career in 1884, as a contributor to the journal Universul, while studying with Theodor Aman at the Academy of Fine Arts in Bucharest (graduated 1886). Vermont completed his training at the Munich Akademie der Bildenden Künste (1893). He was able to attend the latter institution after being endorsed by the major Romanian artist Nicolae Grigorescu.

While still in Munich, Vermont joined Tinerimea Artistică, a loose grouping of artists who rejected Academism—it rallied together Luchian, Arthur Verona, Kimon Loghi, Ipolit Strâmbu, Marius Bunescu, Alexandru Satmari, Oskar Späthe, Jean Alexandru Steriadi, and Ștefan Popescu, and received backing from poet Ștefan Octavian Iosif. Like the rest of Tinerimea Artistică, Vermont was heavily influenced by Grigorescu during his youth.

In 1896, Vermont, Luchian, Artachino, and Bogdan-Pitești, founded Salonul Independenților, the local version of the French Société des Artistes Indépendants. The movement which they attempted to create accommodated various tenets, and, while proclaiming a need for renewal in Romanian art, stressed the importance of earlier traditions. As Luchian incorporated Symbolism, Vermont developed his own style, a religious form of Realism. In parallel, with Luchian, Juan Alexandru Paraschivescu-Alpar, and Artachino, Vermont was one of the first to introduce themes related to the lives of unemployed individuals and social drifters. Such work was influenced by the Akademie der Bildenden Künste's genre painting.

Bogdan-Pitești declared Vermont "one of the most accomplished" among Romanian painters, and bought many of his works. Two years after Salonul Independenţilor opened for the public, its initiators (together with Ioan Bacalbașa) founded Societatea Ileana, an association dedicated to promoting new styles in art. In 1906, during the 40th celebration of King Carol I's ascension to the Romanian throne, Vermont's paintings were exhibited in Bucharest alongside the works of Grigorescu, Verona, and Loghi (they won the admiration of Krikor H. Zambaccian, the future art collector, who declared himself "obsessed" with their image).

Many of his works are hosted by public collections such as the National Museum of Art, the Vasile Pârvan Museum in Bârlad, the Bucovina Art Museum in Suceava, and the Art Museums in Constanța and Râmnicu Vâlcea. A large portion of his art, belonging to collector Lazăr Munteanu, was destroyed during the 1944 Luftwaffe bombing of Bucharest. During his artistic career, Vermont also painted churches in Cernavodă (1893) and Mănești, Prahova (1895), as well as decorating the ceilings of the Kalinderu (1904) and Cantacuzino Palaces in Bucharest.

== Gallery ==
Click on an image to view it enlarged.

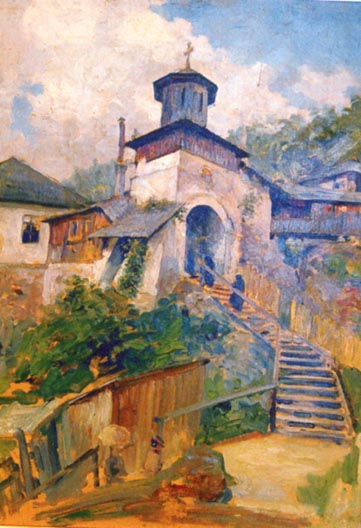
Nămăești Monastery (c. 1901)

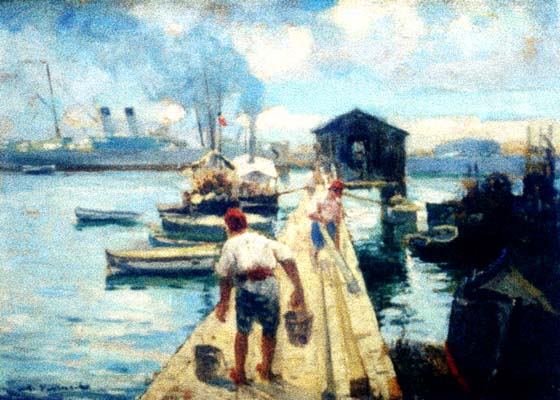
Seascape with Constanța Harbor

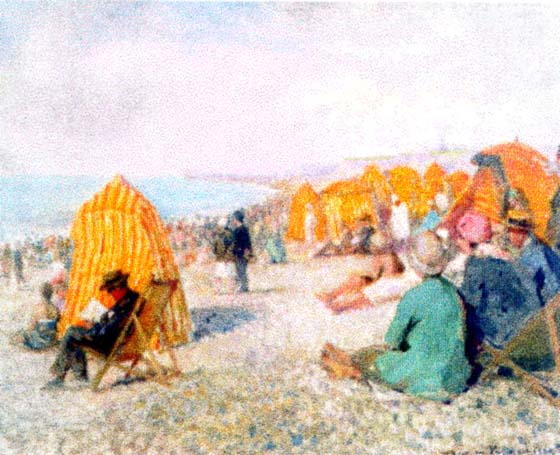
The Beach in Dieppe (1929)

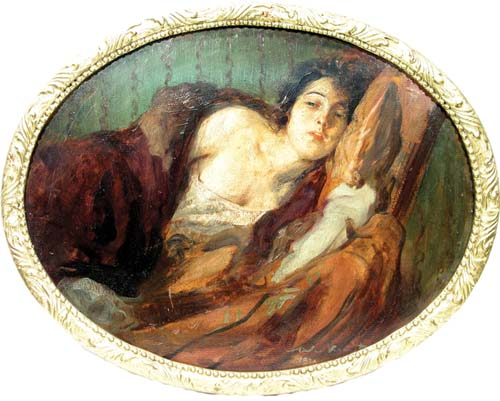
Reverie (1920)

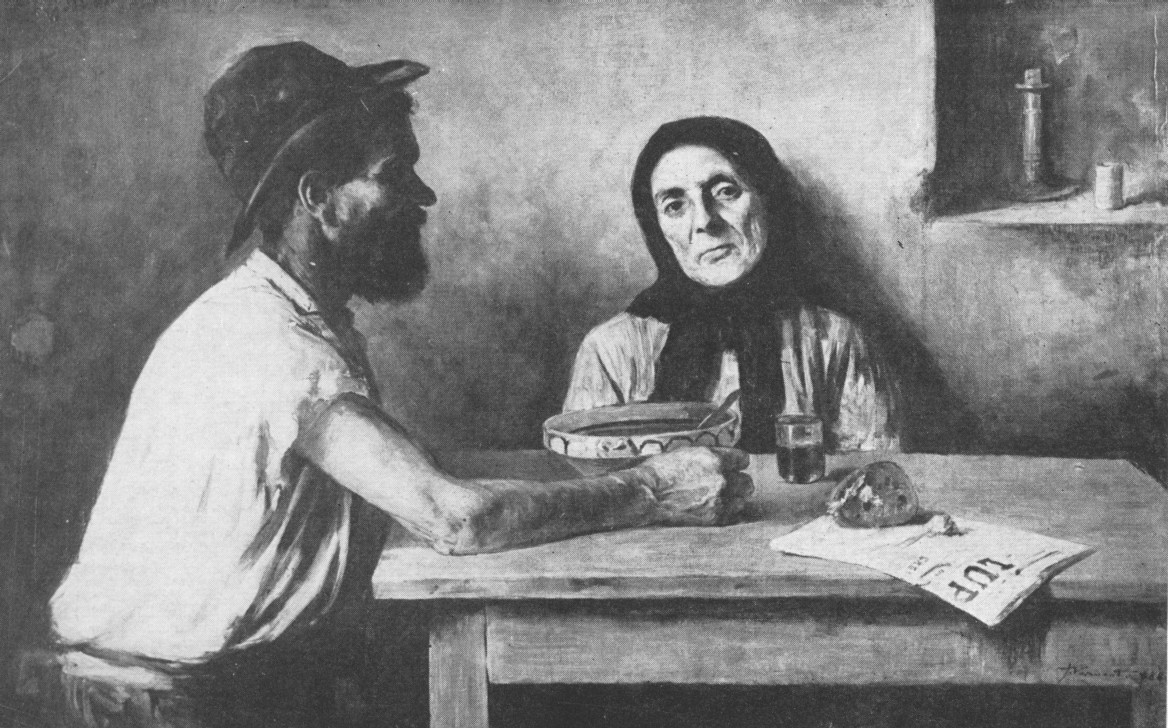
Two Workers on Strike

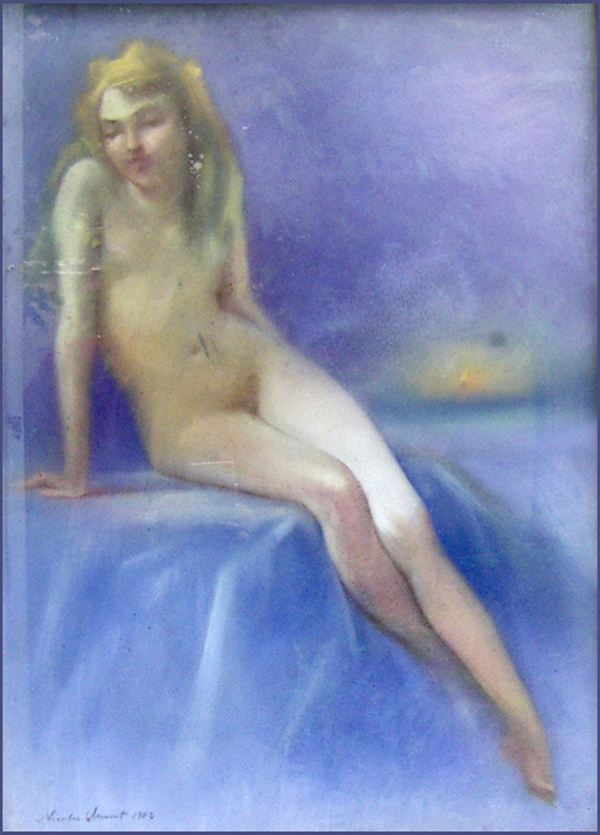
Seated Nude (1902)

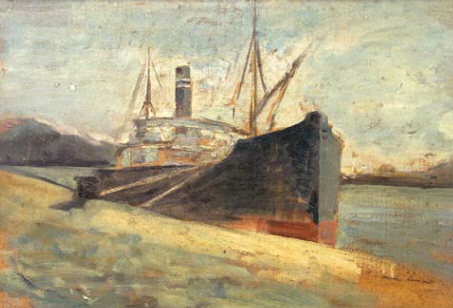
Docked Ship

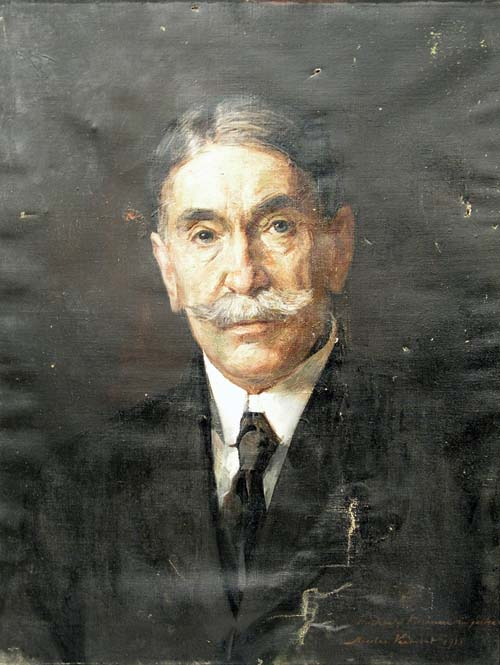
Portrait of a Man (1918)
