= Dărmănești (disambiguation) =

Dărmăneşti or Dârmăneşti may refer to several places in Romania:

- Dărmănești, a town in Bacău County
- Dârmănești, a commune in Argeș County
- Dărmănești, Dâmbovița, a commune in Dâmboviţa County
- Dărmănești, Suceava, a commune in Suceava County
- Dărmănești, a neighborhood of Piatra Neamț, Neamț County
