= Cricovul Dulce =

Cricovul Dulce Cricov
- Location within Romania

Location
- Country: Romania
- Counties: Dâmbovița, Prahova
- Towns: Moreni

Physical characteristics
- Mouth: Ialomița
  - coordinates: 44.7482°N 25.9532°E
- Length: 80 km (50 mi)
- Basin size: 579 km^{2} (224 sq mi)

Basin features
- Progression: Ialomița→ Danube→ Black Sea
- Tributaries
  - left: Provița

The Cricovul Dulce or Cricov is a left tributary of the river Ialomița in Romania. It discharges into the Ialomița near Podu Văleni. It flows through the towns and villages Valea Lungă-Cricov, Iedera de Jos, Moreni, Ion Luca Caragiale, Vlădeni, Băltița, Hăbud, and Crivățu. Its length is 80 km (50 mi) and its basin size is 579 km^{2} (224 sq mi). Part of the water from the river Prahova is diverted towards the Cricovul Dulce by the canal Iazul Morilor Prahova.

== Tributaries ==
The following rivers are tributaries to the river Cricovul Dulce (from source to mouth):

- Left: Sultan, Valea Ursului, Ruda, Provița
- Right: Strâmbul, Neagra
