= Coada Izvorului =

Coada Izvorului may refer to several villages in Romania:

- Coada Izvorului, a village in Petrești, Dâmbovița
- Coada Izvorului, a village in Măneşti, Prahova
