= Piorești =

Pioreşti may refer to several villages in Romania:

- Pioreşti, a village in Goiești Commune, Dolj County
- Pioreşti, a village in Poienarii Burchii Commune, Prahova County
