= Perșunari =

Perşunari may refer to several villages in Romania:

- Perşunari, a village in Cocorăştii Colţ Commune, Prahova County
- Perşunari, a village in Gura Vadului Commune, Prahova County
