= Nămăești Monastery =

Monastery in Argeș County, Romania

- Mănăstirea Nămăești
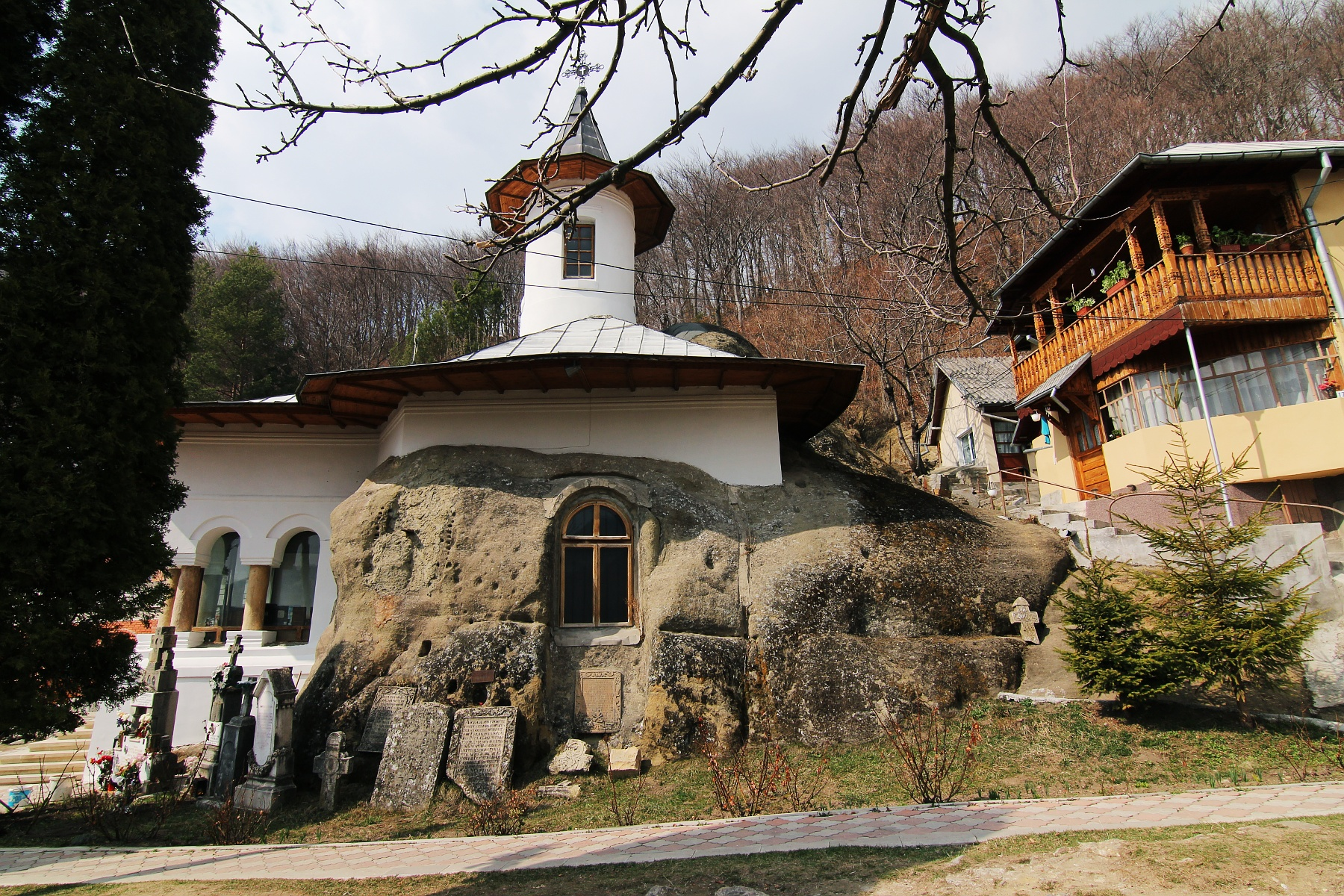
- Interactive map of Nămăești Monastery

Monastery information
- Denomination: Romanian Orthodox
- Established: 16th century

Architecture
- Status: Active
- Functional status: Nunnery

Site
- Location: Nămăești, Valea Mare-Pravăț, Argeș County
- Country: Romania
- Coordinates: 45°18′16″N 25°06′36″E

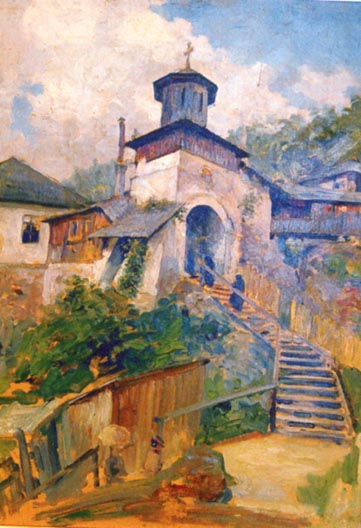
Painting by Nicolae Vermont, c. 1901

The Nămăești Monastery (Romanian: Mănăstirea Nămăești) is located in the village of Nămăești, in the commune of Valea Mare-Pravăț, in Argeș County, Romania.

== Historical data ==
Located 5 km (3.1 mi) northeast of Câmpulung, the Nămăiești Monastery is situated in an area with ancient historical traces, carved into a rock by an unknown person and dating back to the first half of the 16th century (1547), when Mircea Ciobanu left it to Jupân Dumitru as a hermitage in the village of Nămăiești, but with the condition that, if he had no descendants, the property would remain with the church in the rock. There are no exact dates regarding the founding of the hermitage, but legends passed down orally from ancestors in the village of Nămăiești also mention the name of the ruler Negru Vodă. According to some historians, the church in question was a Christian catacomb from the Roman period.

== History ==
It is said that Nămăești is the oldest nunnery in Wallachia. The monastery church is located in a cave, which also houses a miracle-working icon of the Mother of God. A legend says that Saint Andrew slept in that cave one night.

== Bibliography ==
- România – Harta mănăstirilor, Amco Press, 2000
