= Iazul Morilor Prahova =

Specifications
- Length: 35 km (22 mi)

Geography
- Start point: Prahova at Florești, Romania
- End point: Cricovul Dulce at Ghioldum, Romania
- Beginning coordinates: 45.0357°N 25.7775°E
- Ending coordinates: 44.8322°N 25.8692°E

The Iazul Morilor Prahova is an old artificial canal in Prahova County, Romania, built for a succession of water mills. The 35 km (22 mi) long canal originates in the river Prahova near the locality of Florești and flows into the Cricovul Dulce near Ghioldum. The original water mills for which the canal was built have been dismantled and do not exist any more. At present the canal is used for local water supply and irrigation.
