= Cantacuzino Palace =

Romanian historic building

Cantacuzino Palace Palatul Cantacuzino
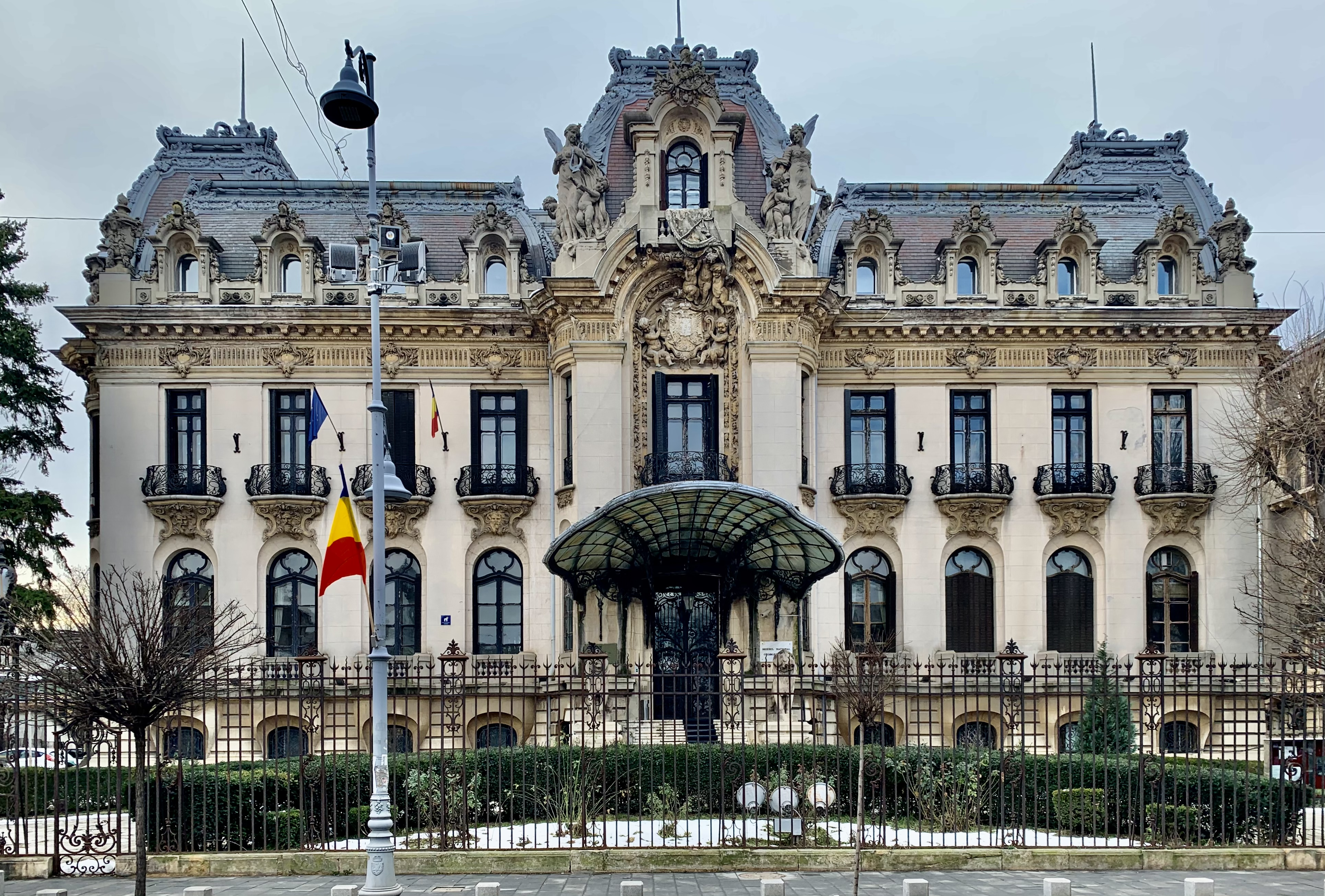

- Location within Romania

General information
- Architectural style: Beaux Arts & Rococo Revival
- Location: Bucharest, Romania
- Coordinates: 44.4487°N 26.0883°E
- Construction started: 1898
- Completed: 1906

Design and construction
- Architect: Ion D. Berindey

Cantacuzino Palace is located on Calea Victoriei no. 141, Bucharest, Romania. It was built by architect Ion D. Berindey in the Beaux Arts style, having a few Rococo Revival rooms. Today it houses the George Enescu museum.

== History ==
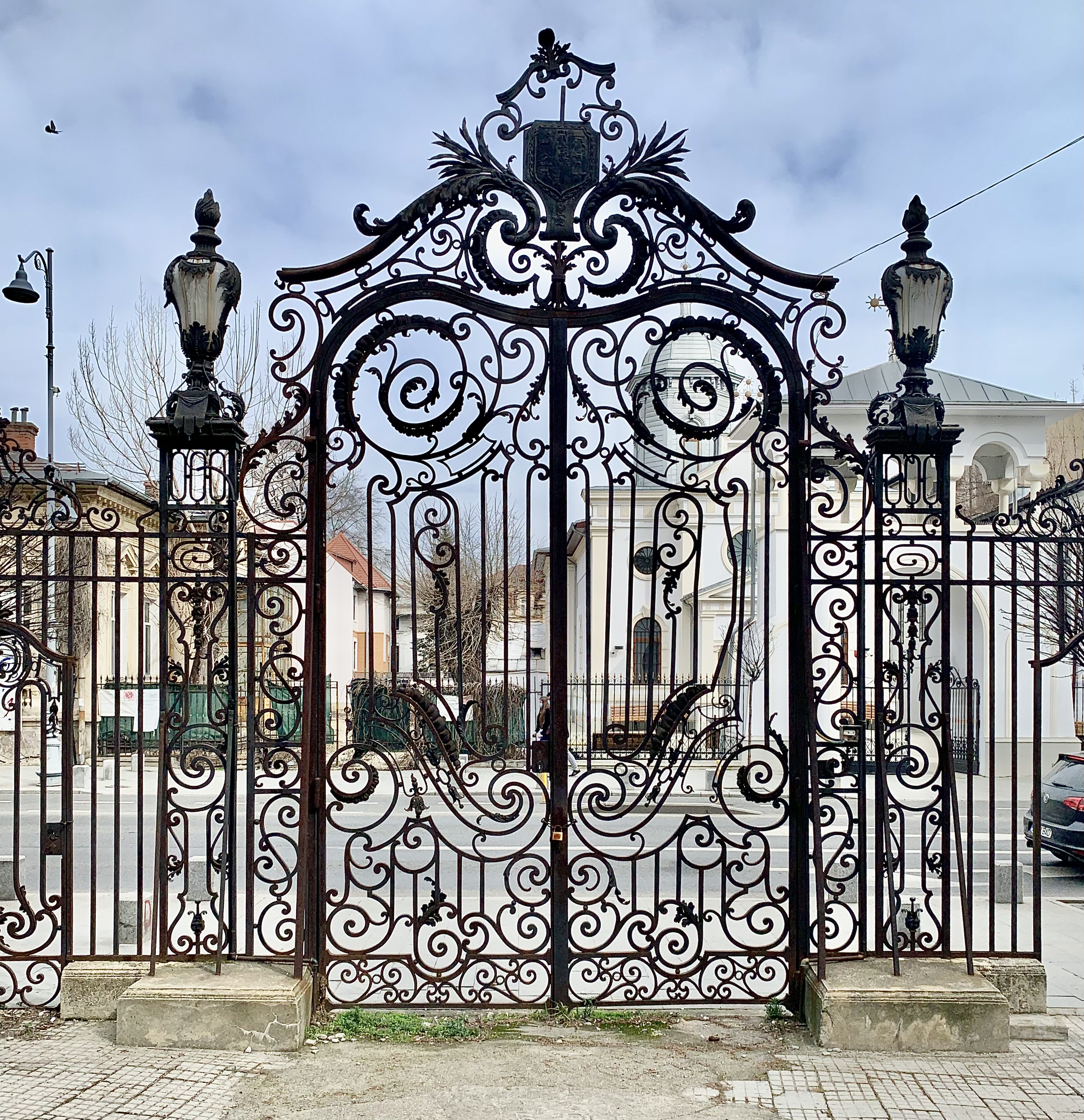
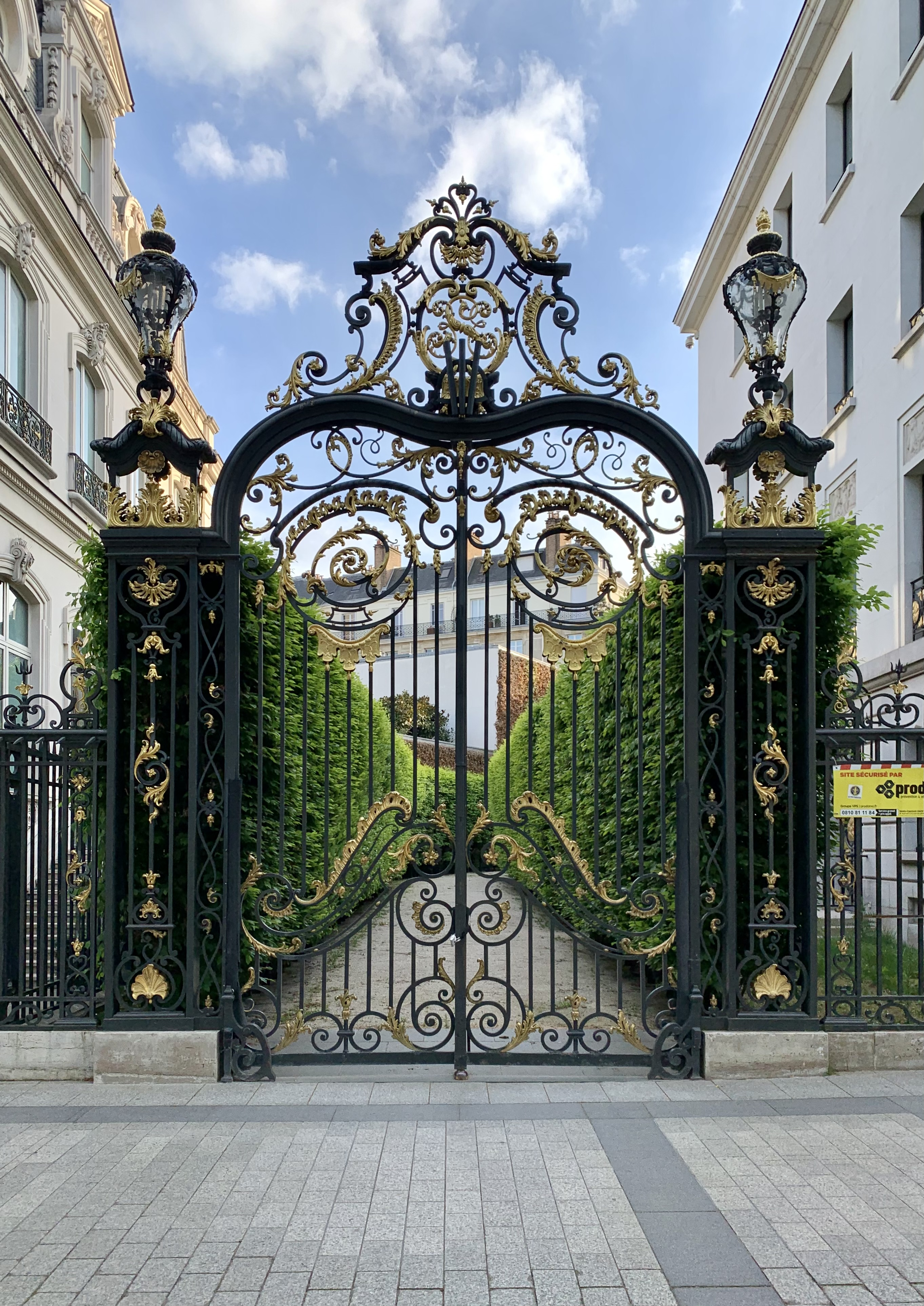
One of the gates of the palace (left), and a gate of the Hôtel du Rond-Point in Paris (right), both being very similar

The palace was built in 1901–1902 for Gheorghe Grigore Cantacuzino, mayor of Bucharest and former prime-minister, after the plans of Ion D. Berindey, in the French Beaux Arts style. After his death, the building was inherited by his son Mihail G. Cantacuzino, who died prematurely in 1929. Mihail's wife Maria remarried in December 1939 with music composer George Enescu. On 10 August 1913, at the end of the Second Balkan War, the Treaty of Bucharest was signed here. The building – known as Cantacuzino Palace at the time – also hosted the Presidency of the Council of Ministers in the eve of World War II.

After the death of George Enescu in 1955, his wife stated in her will that the palace would host a museum dedicated to the artist. In 1956, The National Museum George Enescu was established.

In 2021, the museum was closed for a restoration planned to last two years. As of 2026, it remains closed.

== Description ==
The exterior and most of the rooms are Beaux Arts, the rest being Rococo Revival. The two lions at the entrance, and the gates and fences, in the Louis XIV style, give the building a princely look. The palace was a frequent venue for balls. For the decoration of the interiors, Gheorghe Grigore Cantacuzino turned to the most famous artists of the time: George Demetrescu Mirea, Nicolae Vermont and Costin Petrescu. Nicolae Vermont made six medallions (oil on canvas embossed on the wall), three of which were signed and dated 1907. Five of the six medallions are placed above the doors in the hallway that led to the rooms to the right of the entrance. Two of them, Shepherd with Sheep (Cioban cu Oile) and Peasant Woman with Vessel (Țărăncuță cu Cofă), are directly inspired by the work of Nicolae Grigorescu, under whose influence was their author.

In present day, about only five rooms can be visited, the rest being occupied by some institutions.

== Gallery ==
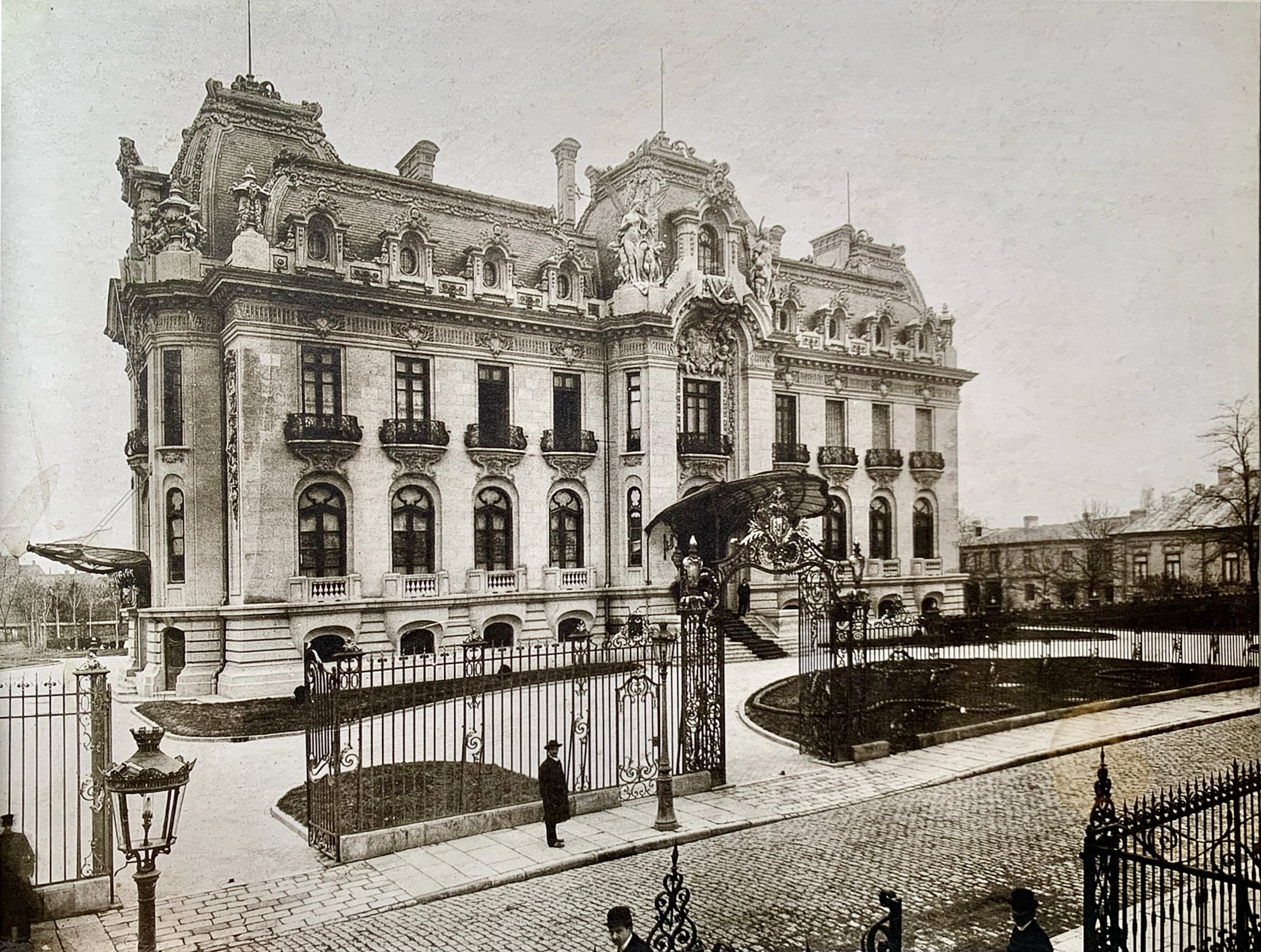
The Palace during the Belle Époque (1877-1916), before the construction of the building at the intersection of Calea Victoriei and Strada Frumoasă

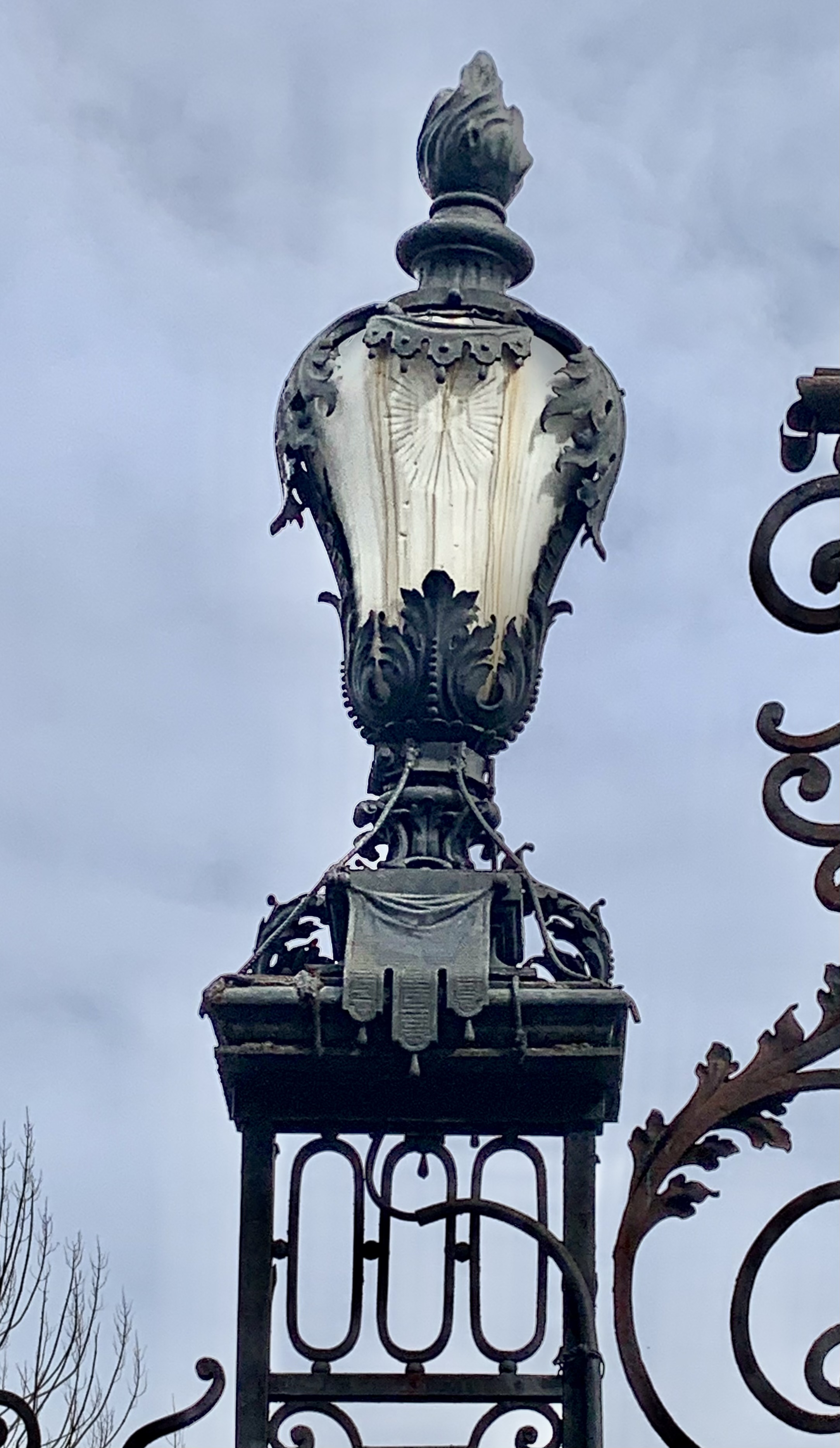
Detail of one of the gates

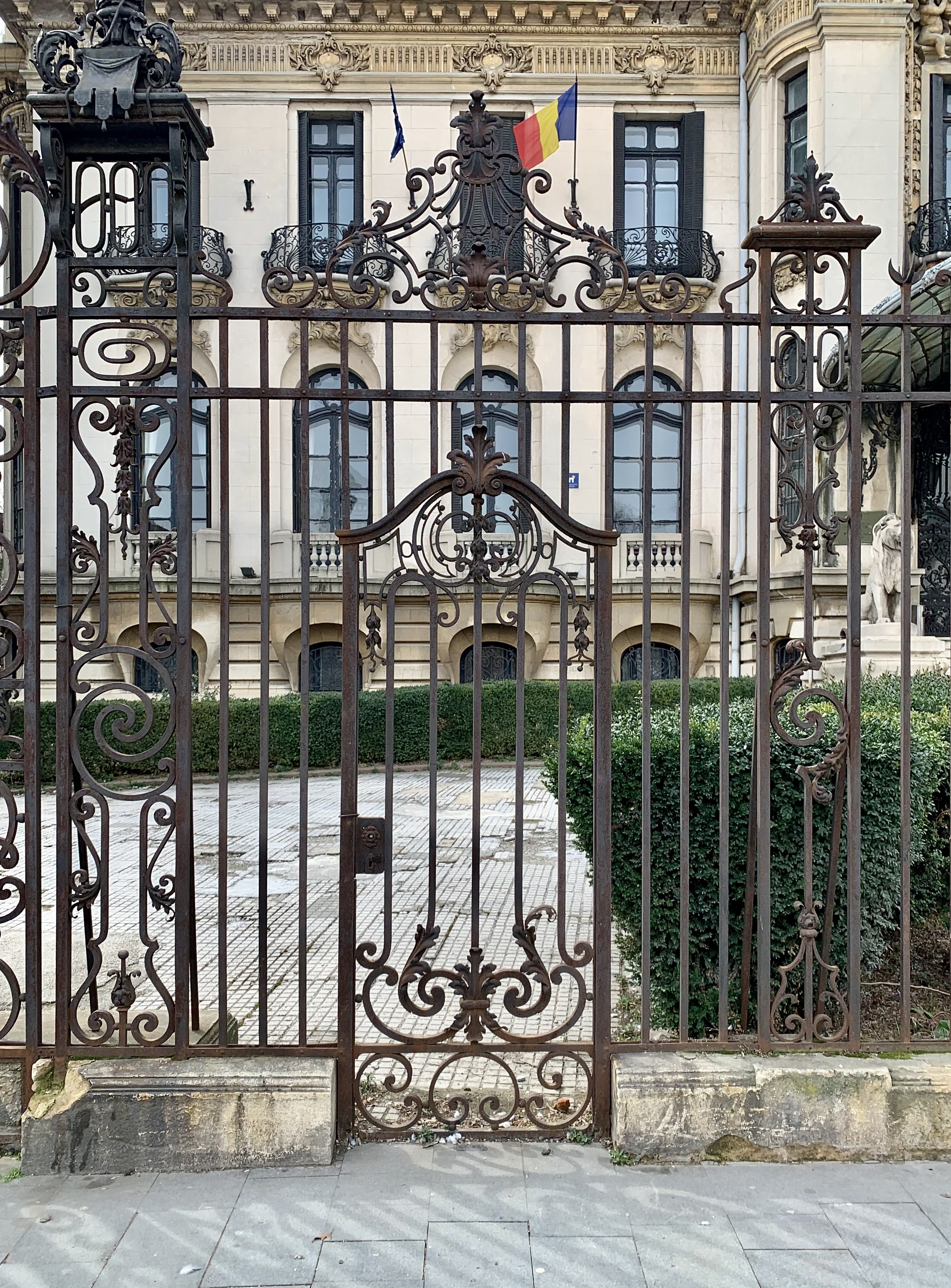
A smaller gate of the palace

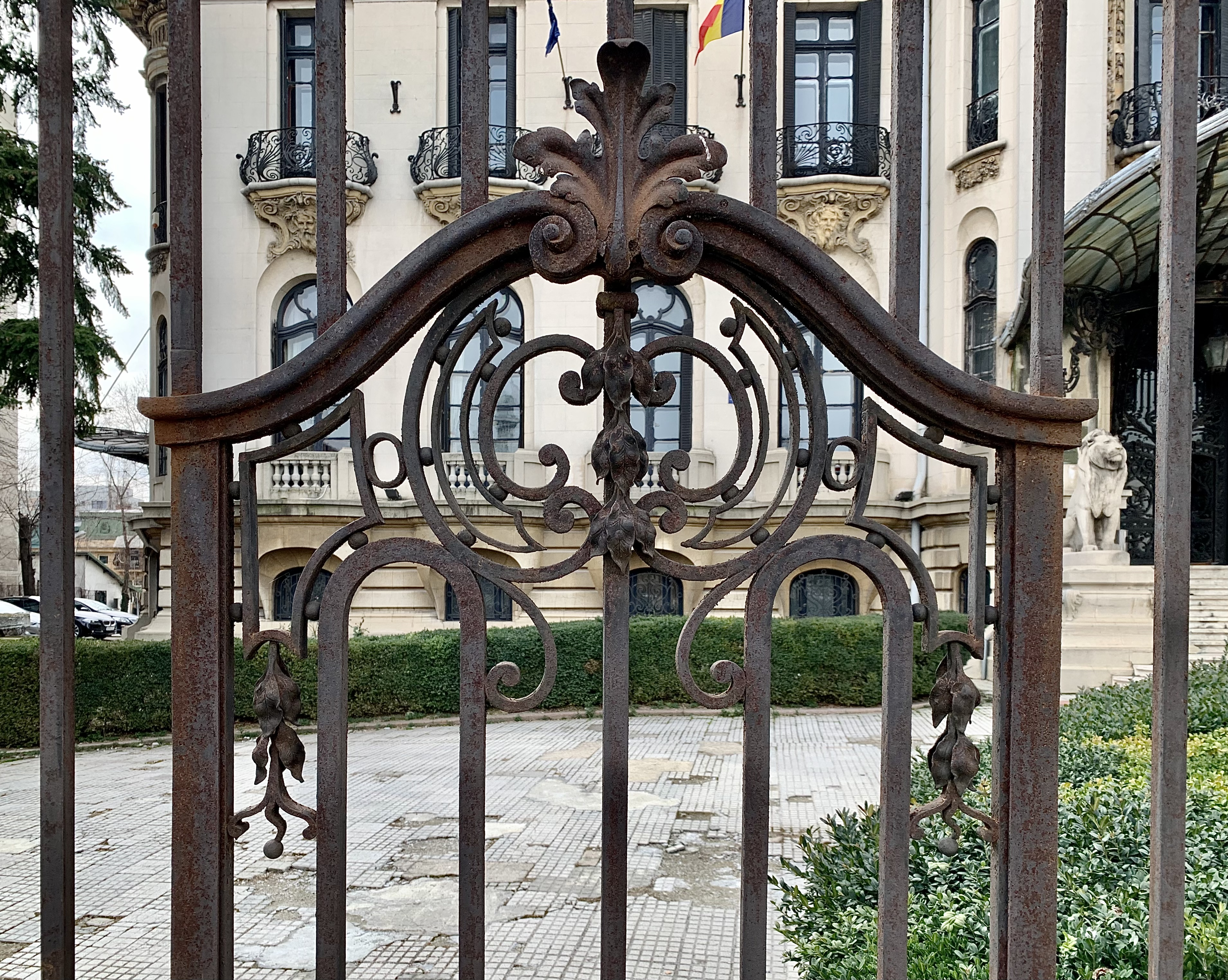
Detail of that smaller gate of the palace

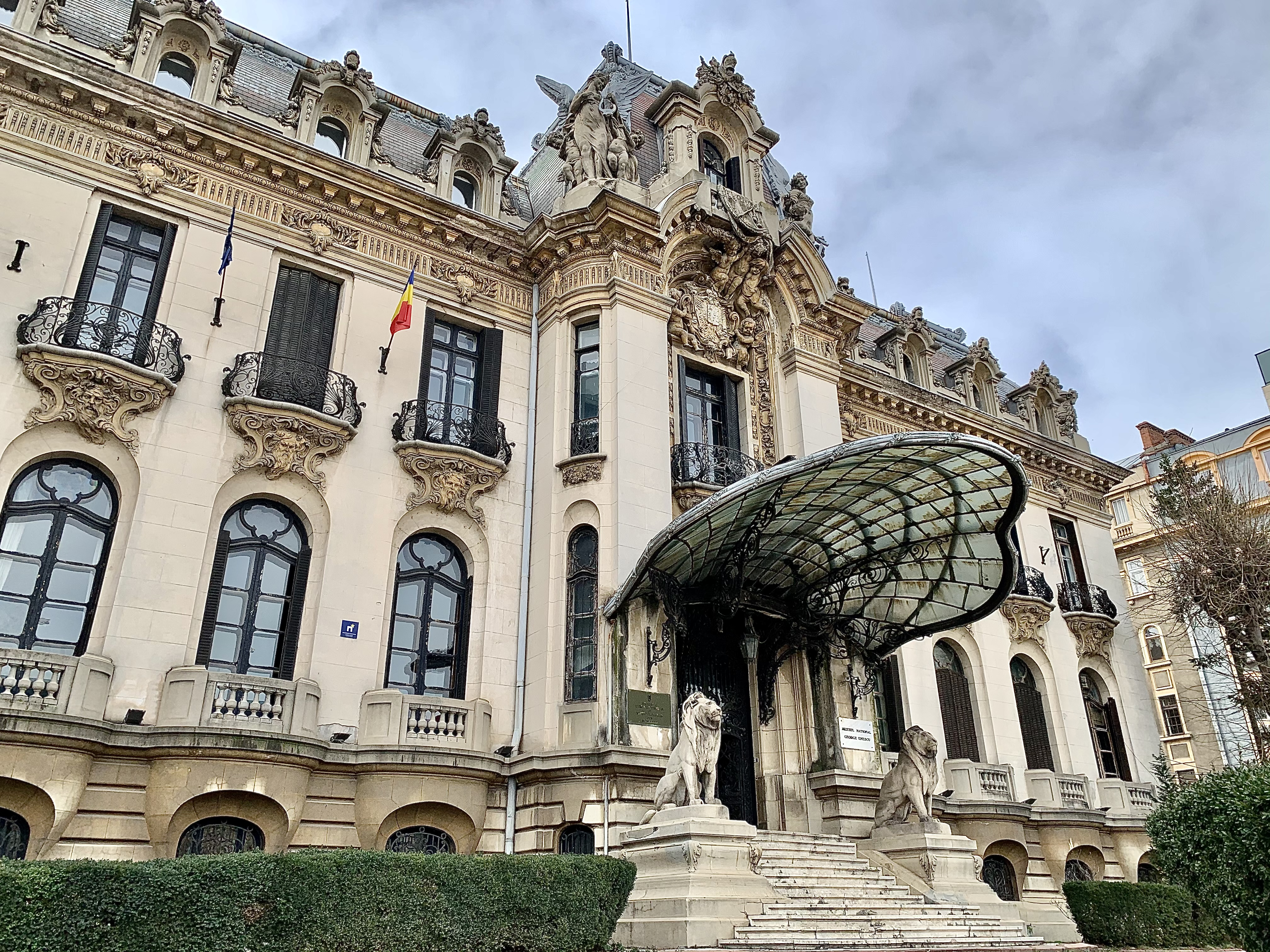
View of the palace, with its pair of Louis XIV style lions at the entrance

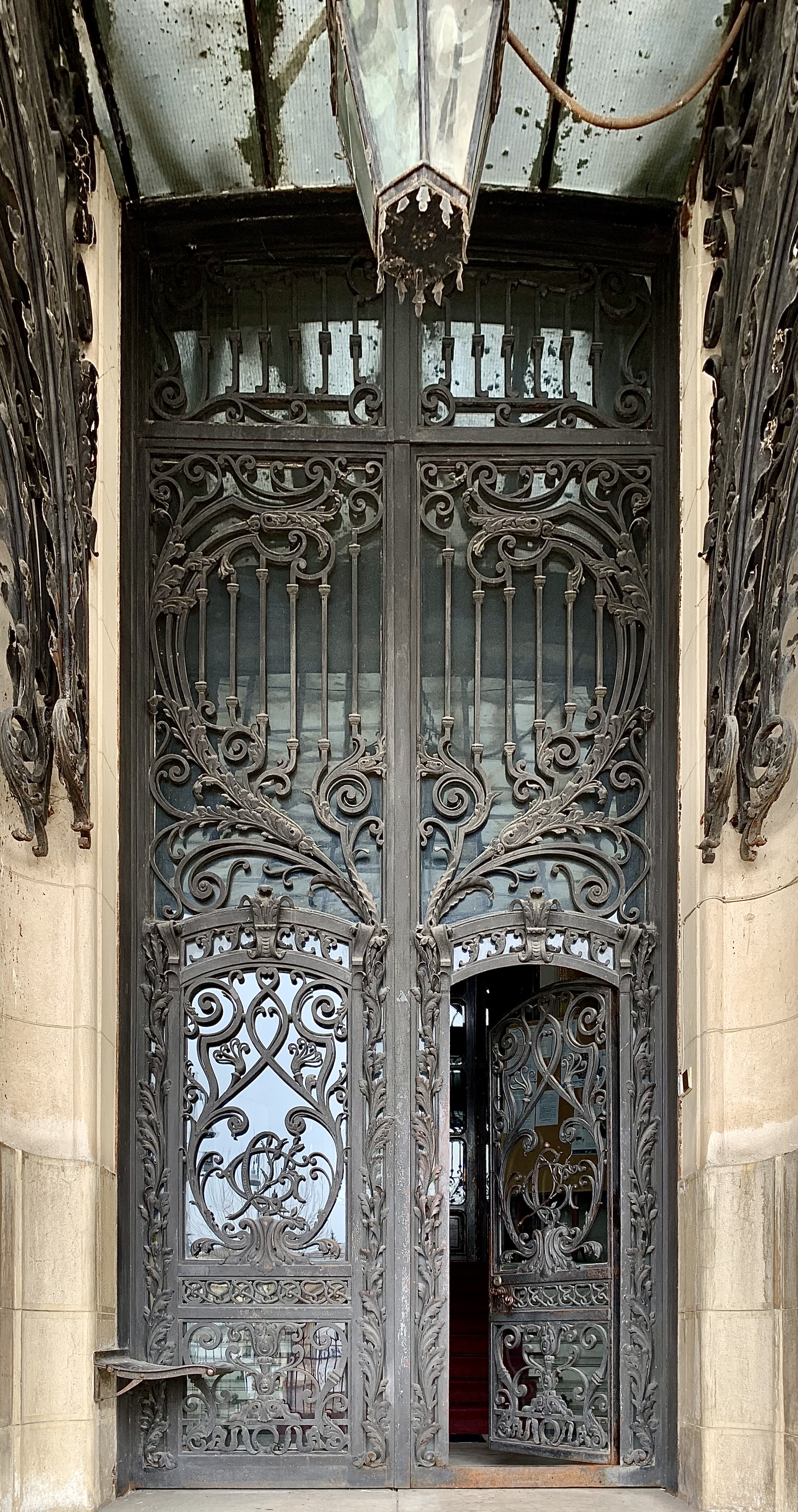
The glass and metal entrance of the palace

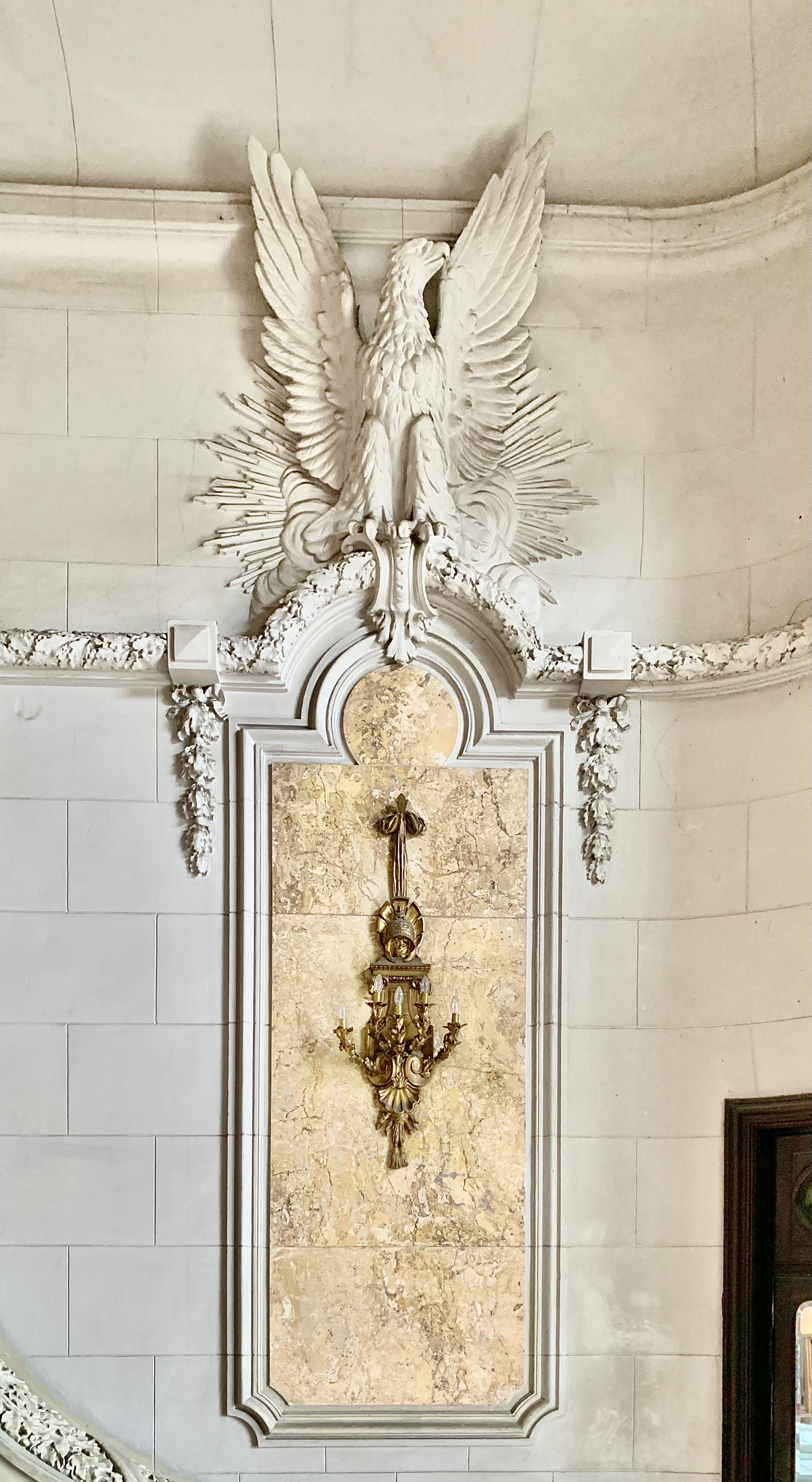
Wall of the entrance room

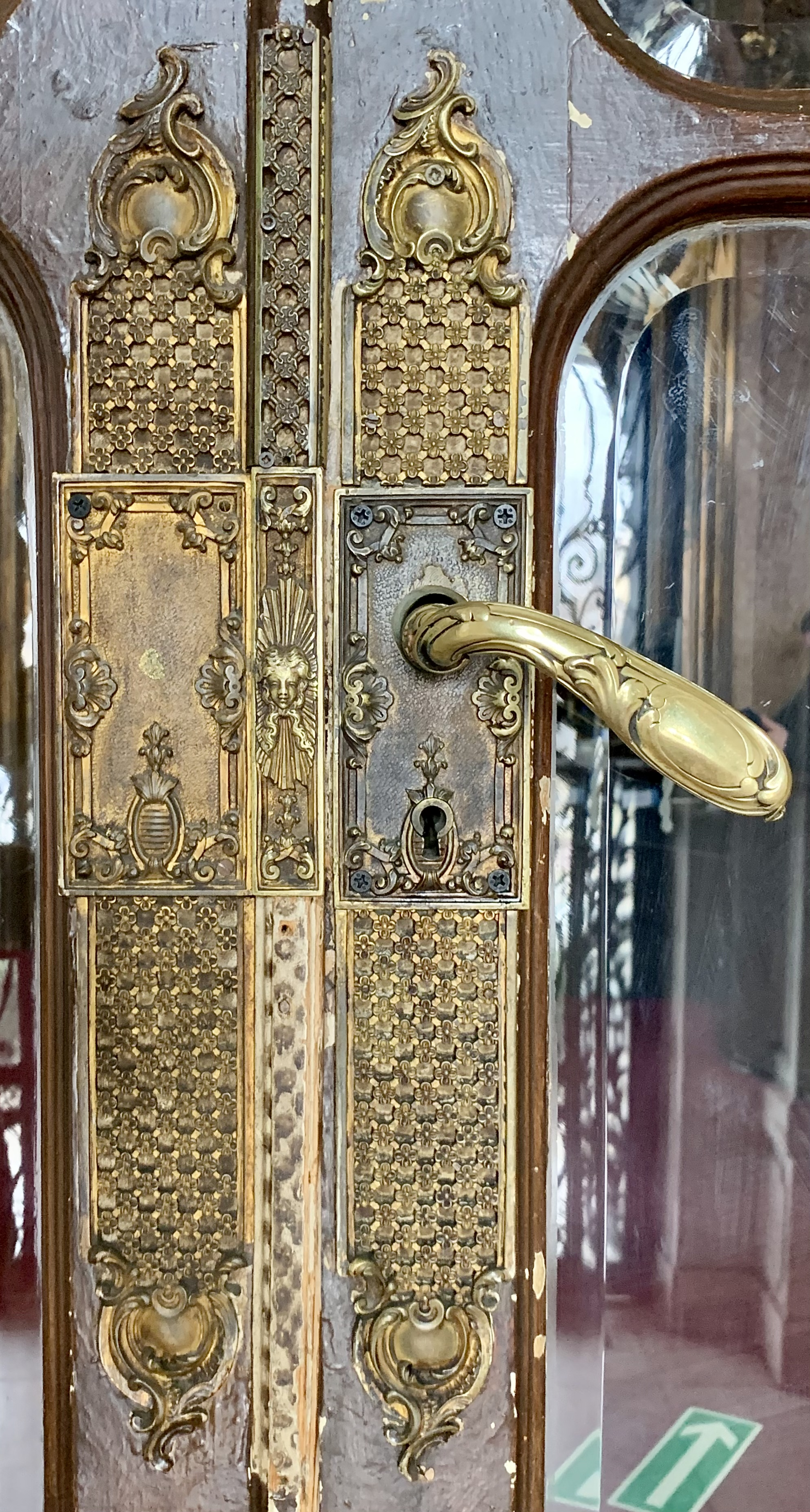
Handle of a door in the entrance room

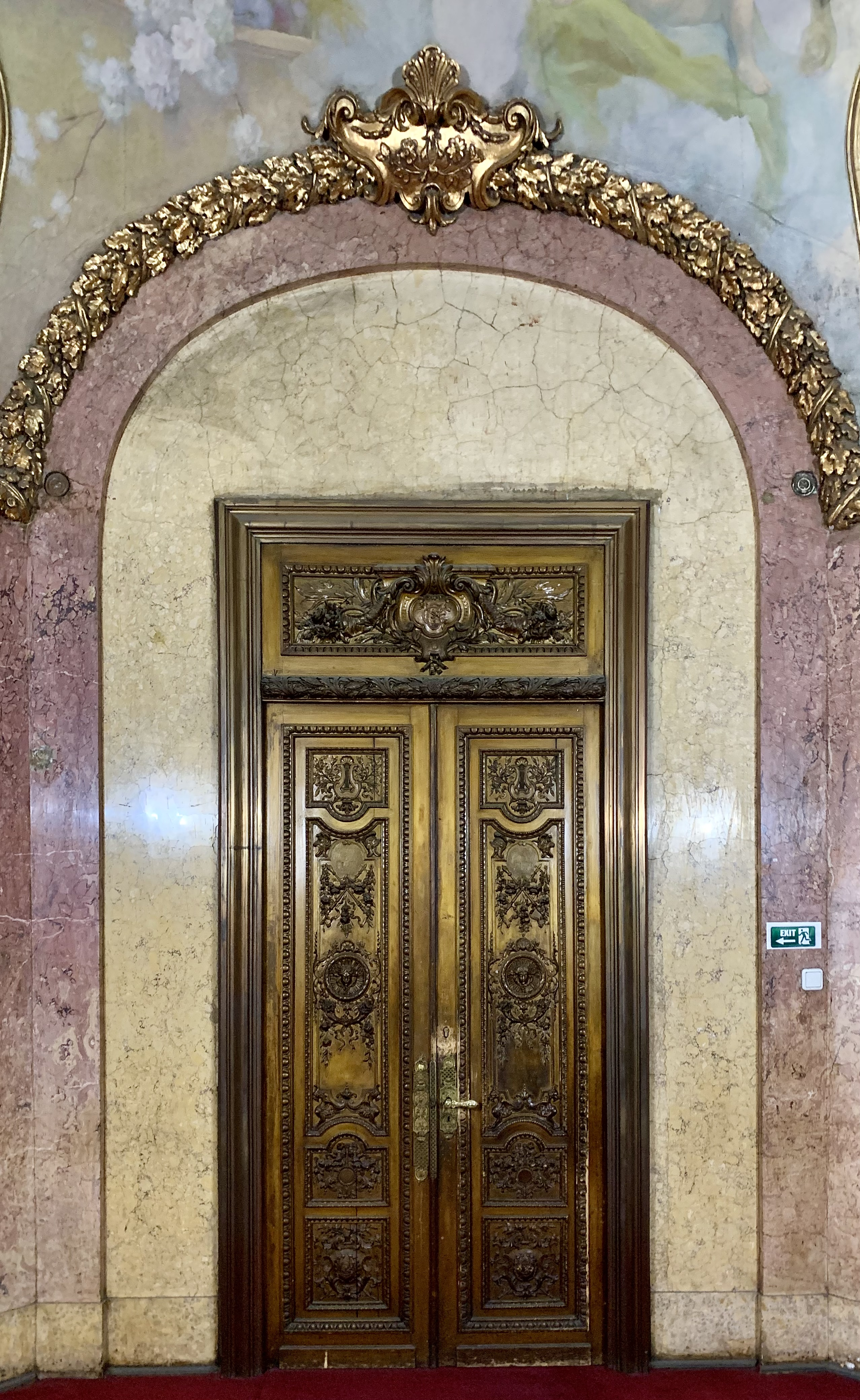
Door in the ground floor hallway

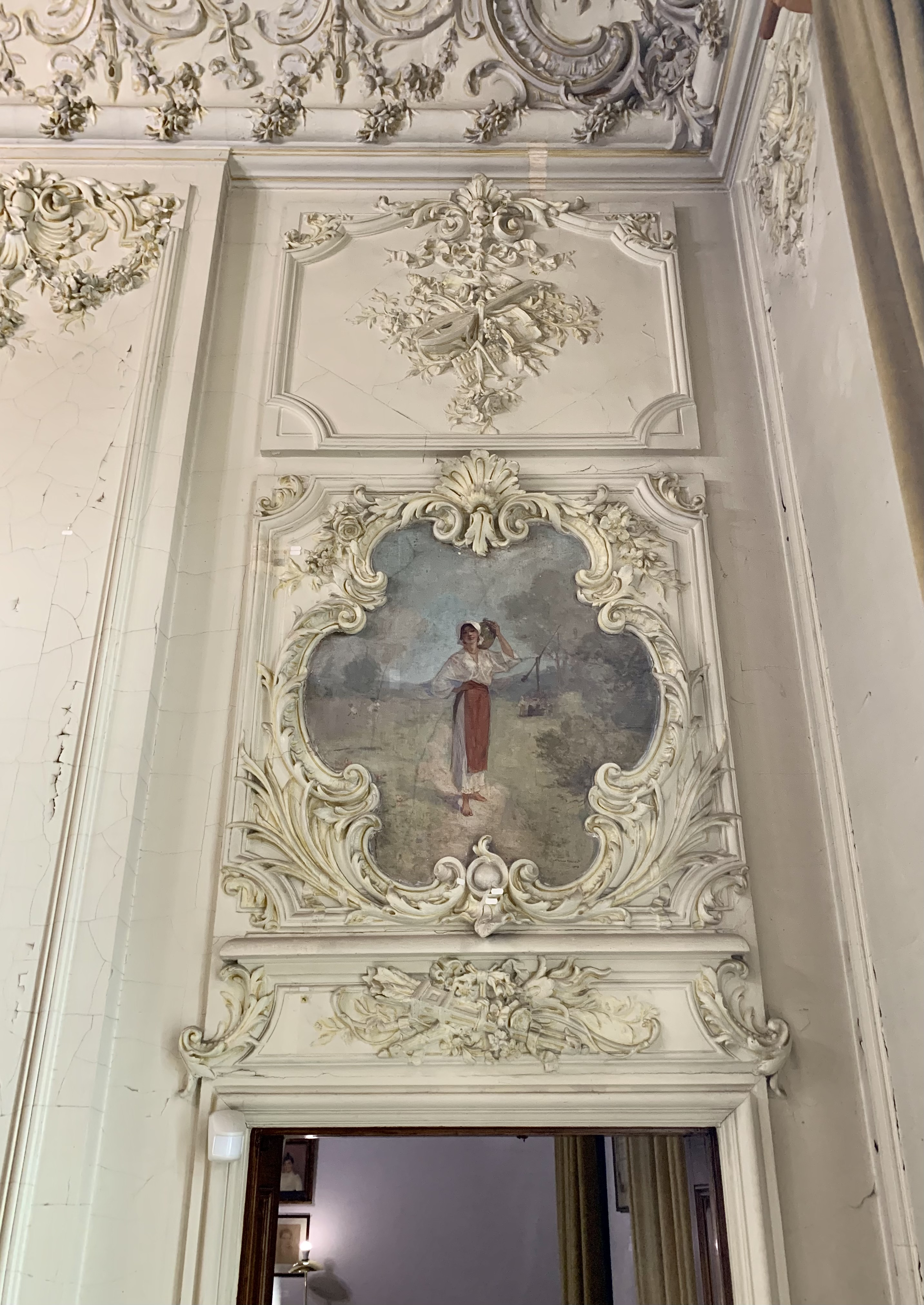
Peasant Woman with Vessel (Țărăncuță cu Cofă) by Nicolae Vermont, surrounded by Rococo Revival stuccos in the room where tickets and souvenirs are sold

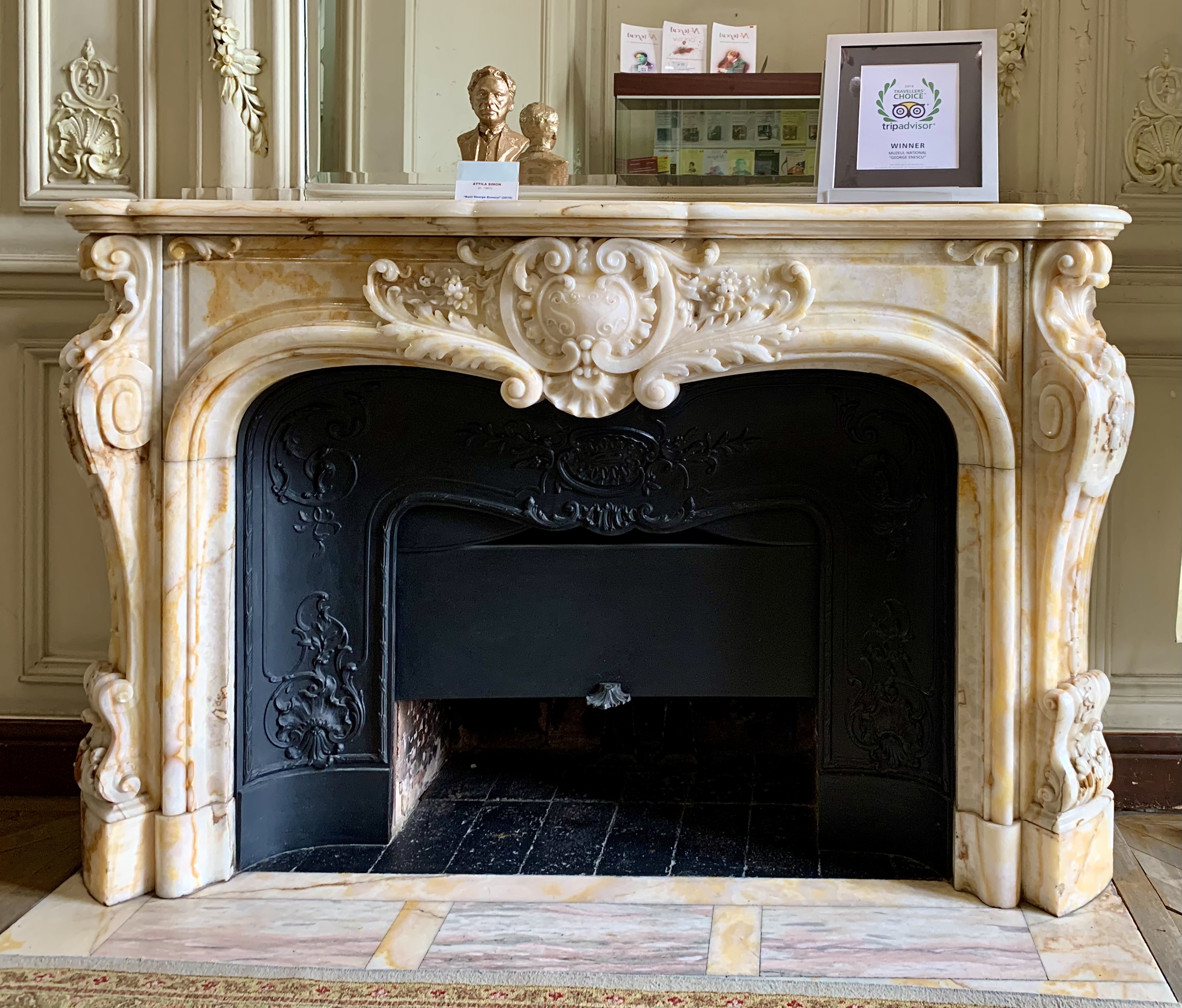
Rococo Revival chimneypiece in the room where tickets and souvenirs are sold

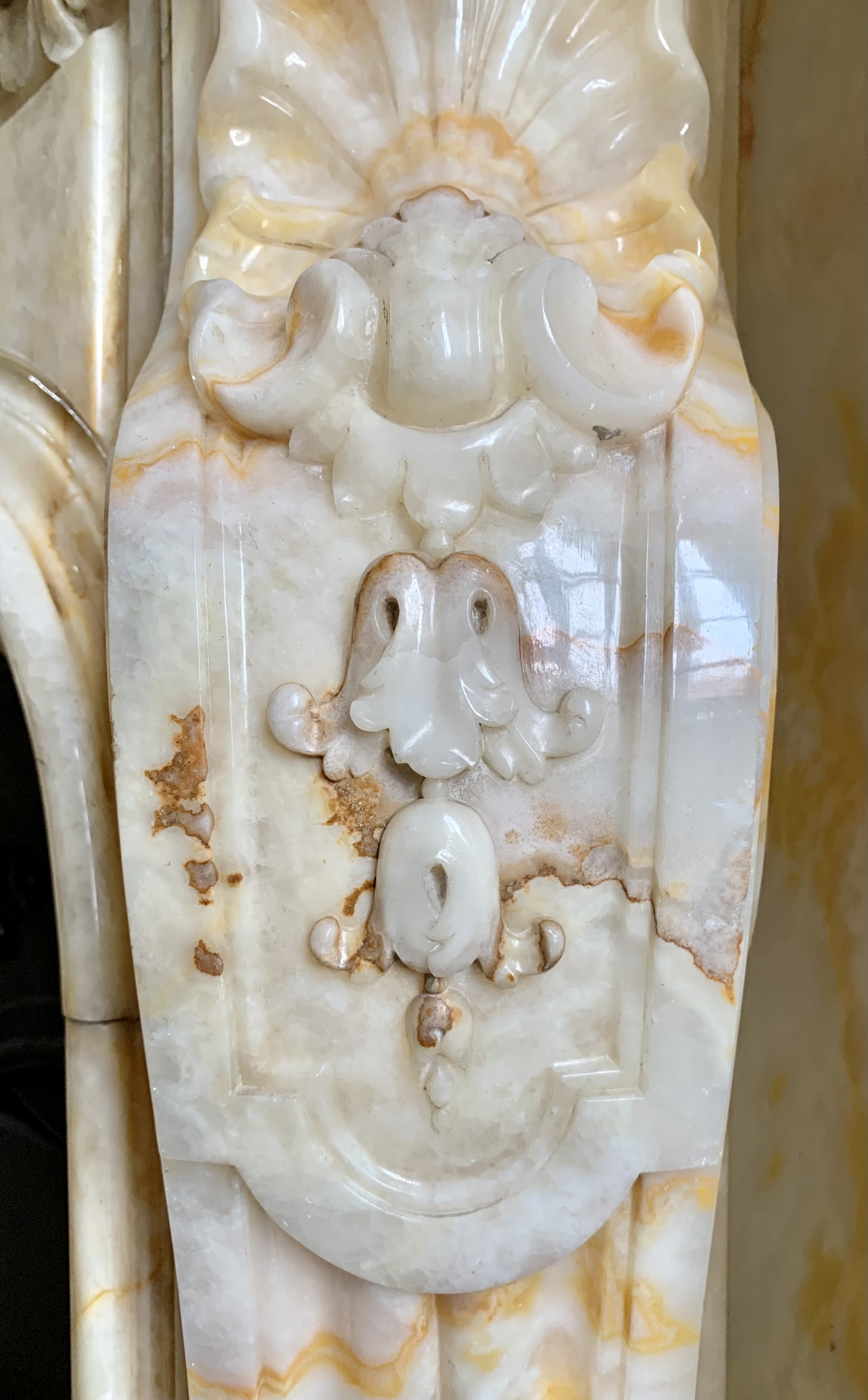
Festoon-based ornament on the same chimneypiece

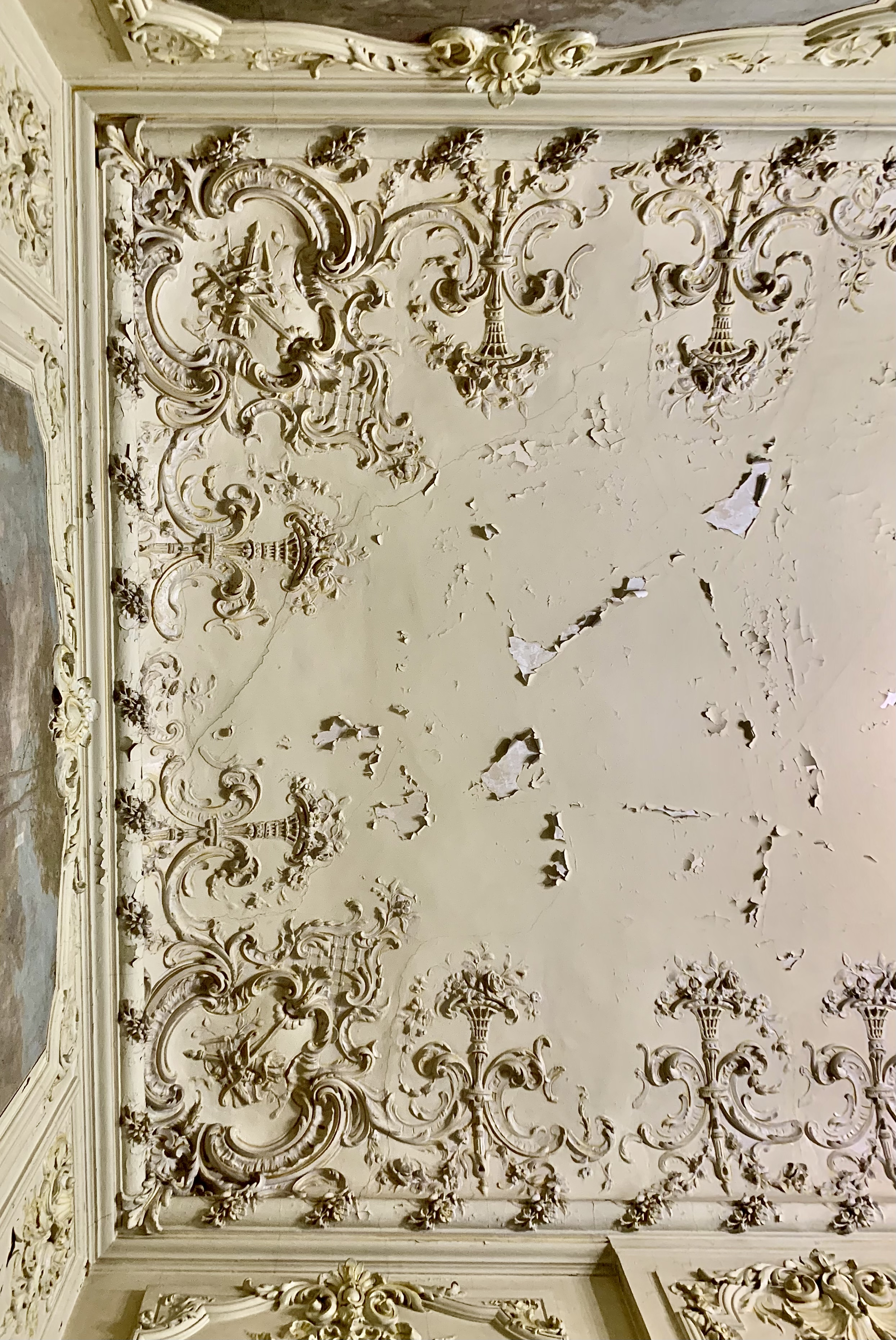
Detail of Rococo Revival stuccos in the same room

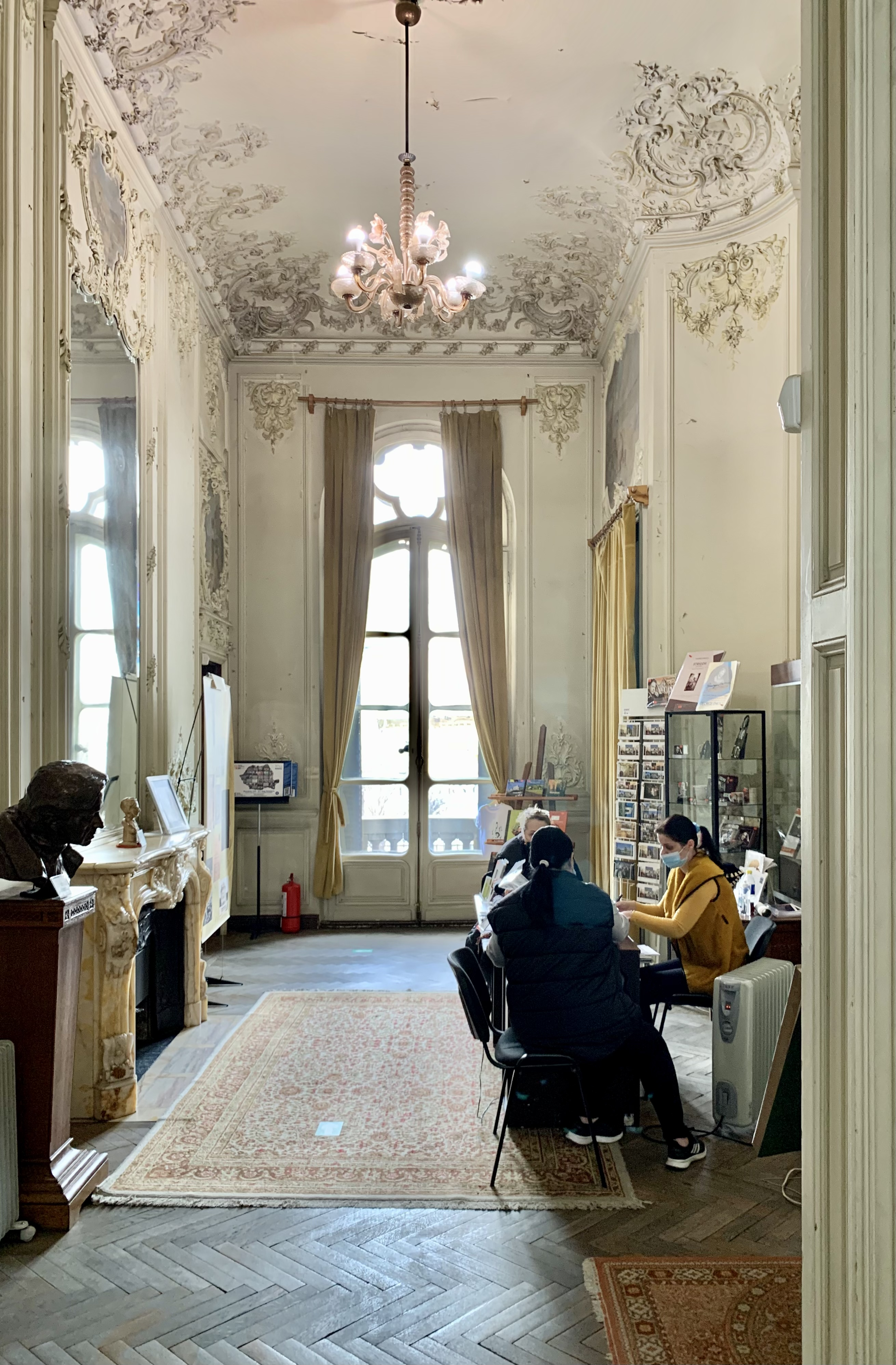
That room

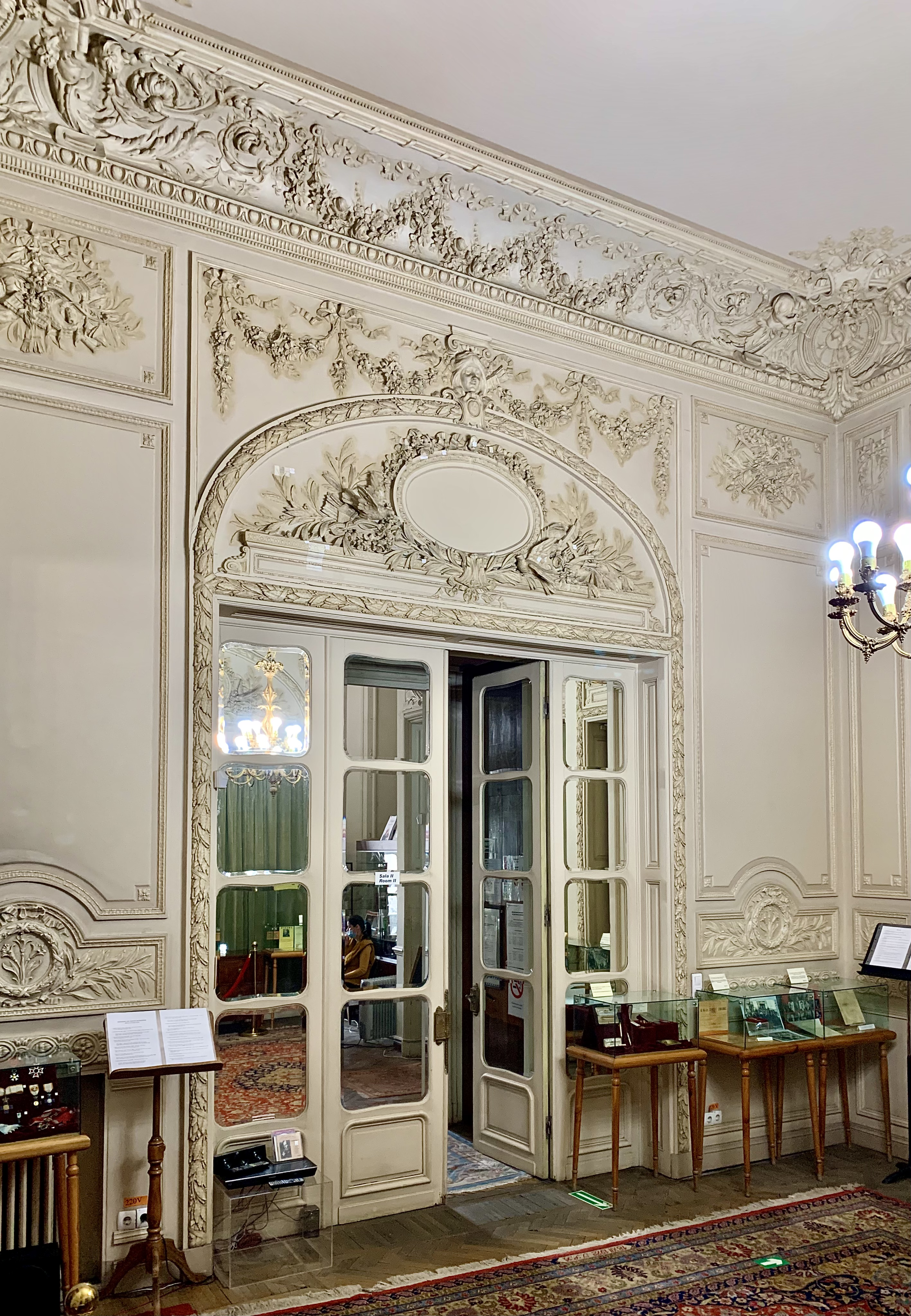
Door of another room, filled with stuccos

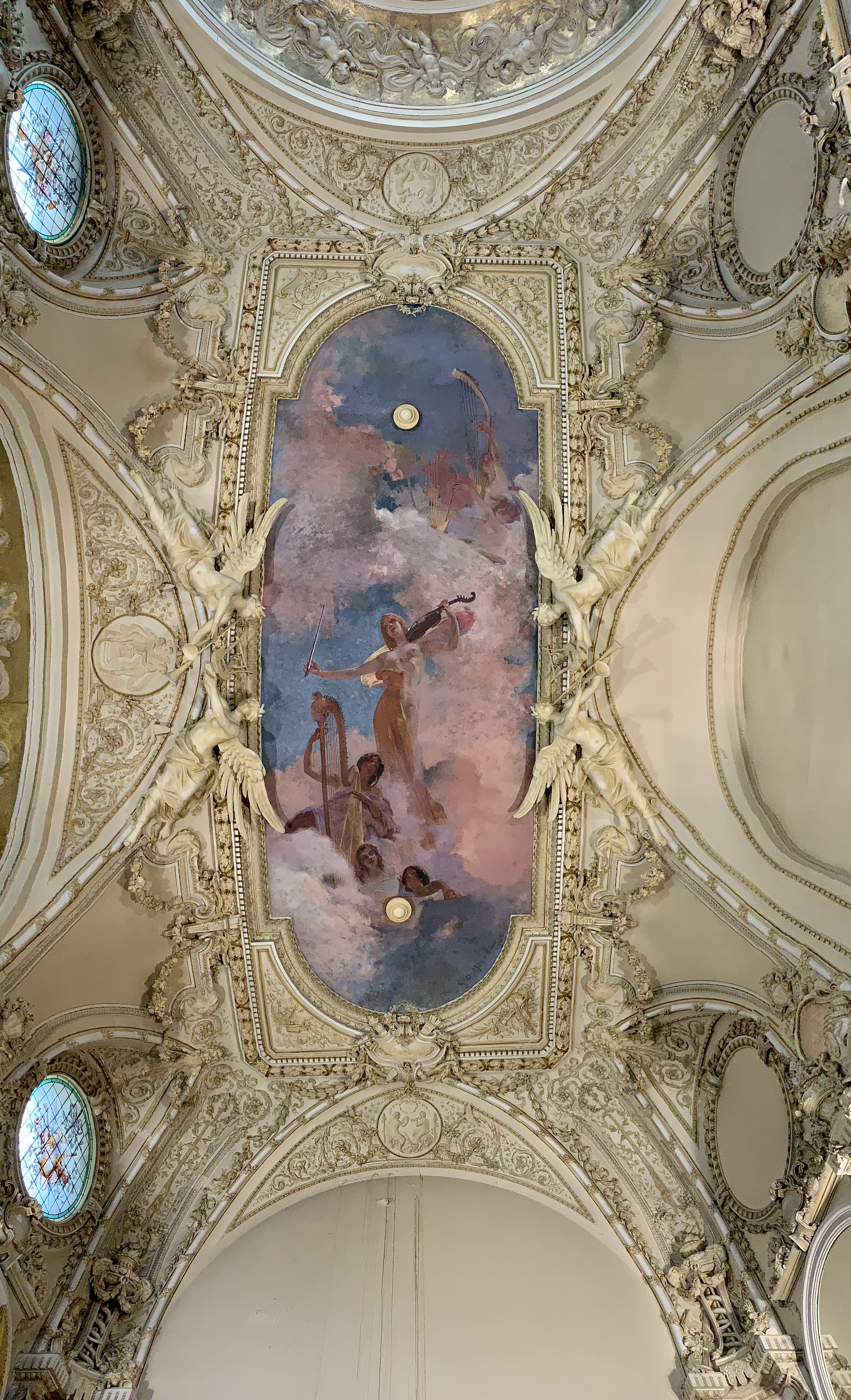
Astonishing highly decorated ceiling in a salon
