= Provița (river) =

- Location within Romania

Location
- Country: Romania
- Counties: Prahova, Dâmbovița

Physical characteristics
- Mouth: Cricovul Dulce
  - location: Vlădeni
  - coordinates: 44.8697°N 25.7600°E
- Length: 48 km (30 mi)
- Basin size: 204 km^{2} (79 sq mi)

Basin features
- Progression: Cricovul Dulce→ Ialomița→ Danube→ Black Sea
- Tributaries
  - left: Târșa
  - right: Roșioara, Seaca

The Provița is a left tributary of the river Cricovul Dulce in Romania. It discharges into the Cricovul Dulce in Vlădeni. It flows through the villages Ocina de Sus, Adunați, Ocina de Jos, Provița de Sus, Provița de Jos, Drăgăneasa, Măgureni, Filipeștii de Pădure and Dițești. Its length is 48 km (30 mi) and its basin size is 204 km^{2} (79 sq mi).
