= Provița de Jos =

- Commune
- Coat of arms

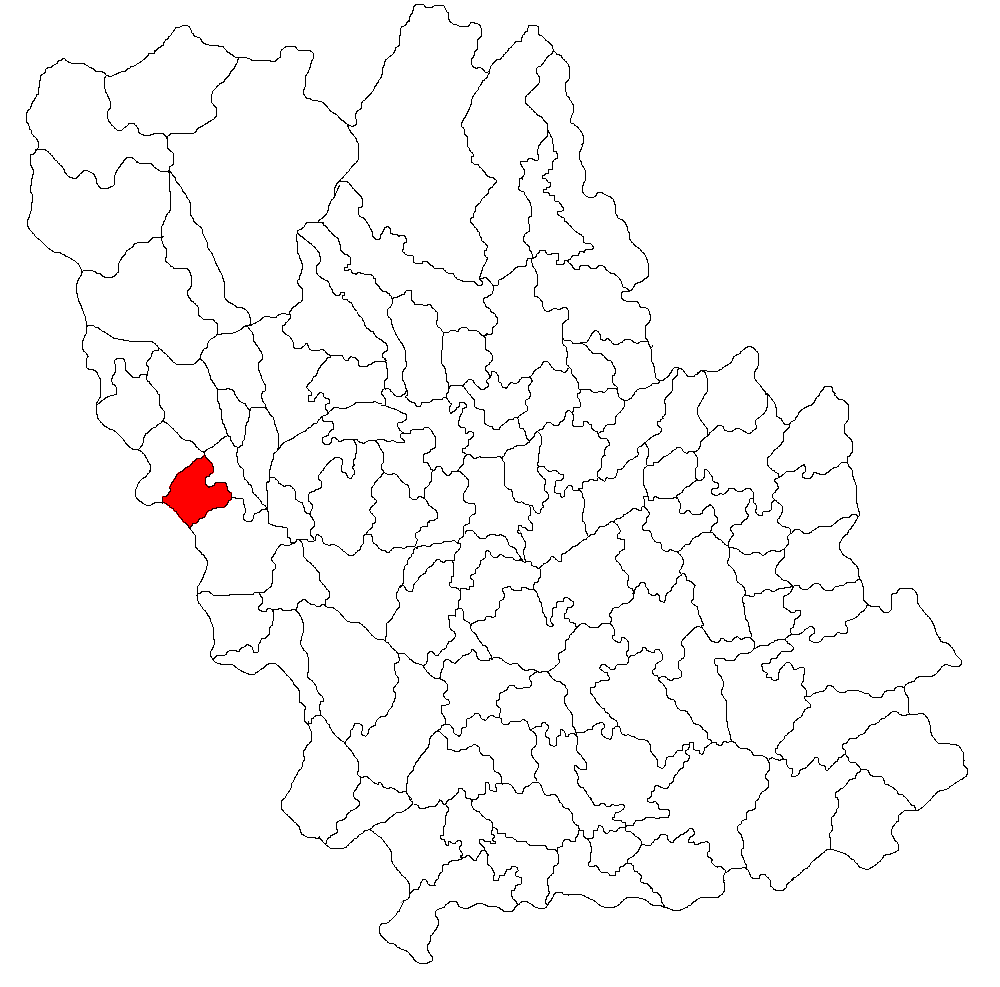
- Location in Prahova County

- Location in Romania
- Coordinates: 45°7′N 25°39′E
- Country: Romania
- County: Prahova

Government
  - Mayor (2020–2024): Ionuț Bocioacă (PSD)
- Area: 25.33 km^{2} (9.78 sq mi)
- Elevation: 422 m (1,385 ft)
- Population (2021-12-01): 2,131
  - Density: 84.13/km^{2} (217.9/sq mi)
- Time zone: UTC+02:00 (EET)
  - Summer (DST): UTC+03:00 (EEST)
- Postal code: 107475
- Area code: +(40) 244
- Vehicle reg.: PH
- Website: www.comunaprovitadejos.ro

Provița de Jos is a commune in Prahova County, Muntenia, Romania. It is composed of three villages: Drăgăneasa, Piatra, and Provița de Jos.

The commune lies along the Provița River, to the west of the county, on the border with Dâmbovița County. It is traversed by the DJ101E road, which connects it to the east with Câmpina and to the north with Provița de Sus and Adunați.

Historical population
Year	Pop.	±%
1992	2,750	—
2002	2,560	−6.9%
2011	2,264	−11.6%
2021	2,131	−5.9%
Source: Census data

== Natives ==
The commune is the birthplace of Dumitru Comănescu, who was briefly the world's oldest verified living man in the world before his death in June 2020, aged 111. It is also the birthplace of writer and actress Aurora Cornu (1931–2021).
