= Cocorăștii Colț =

- Commune
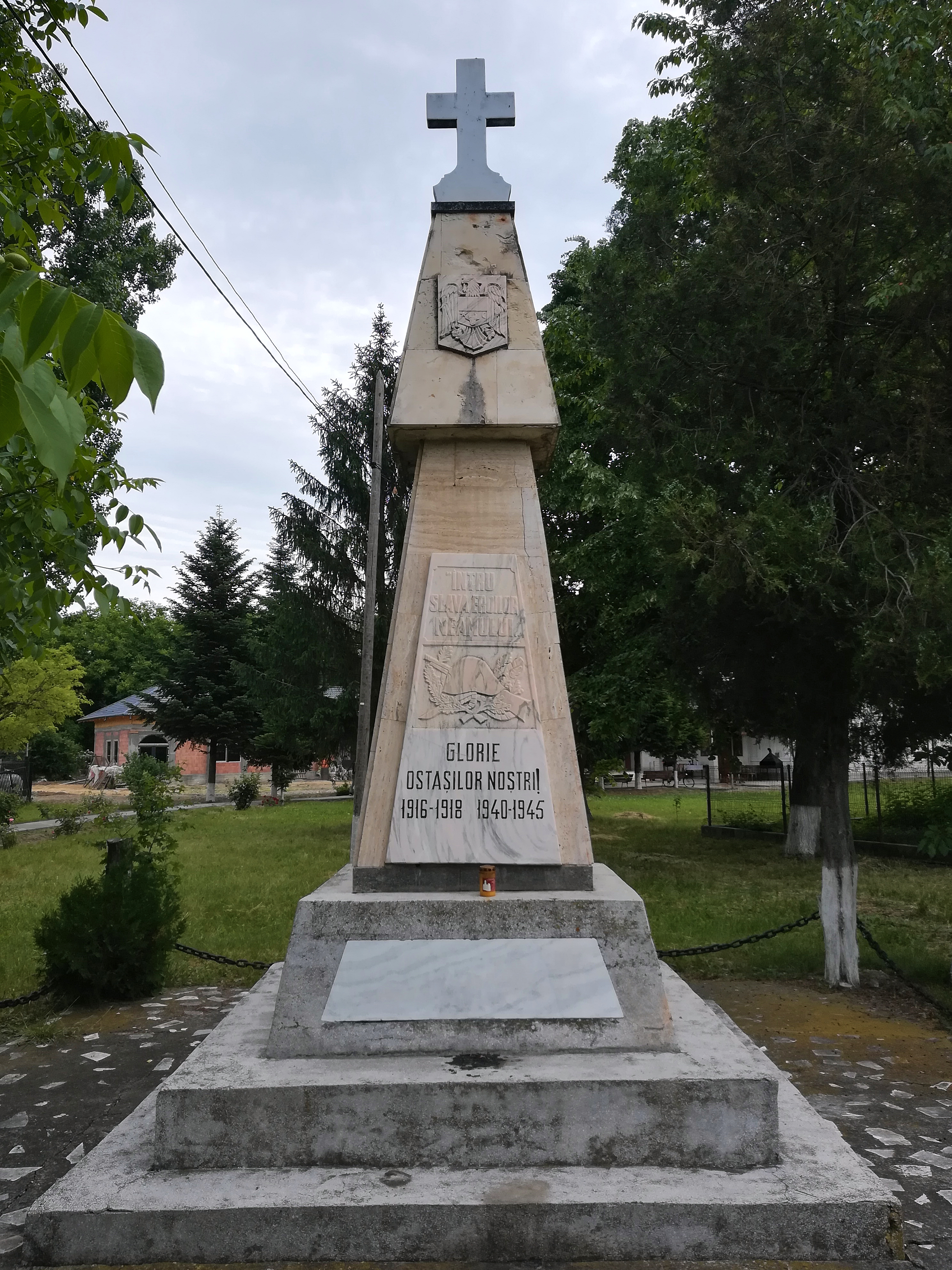
- War memorial in Cocorăștii Colț

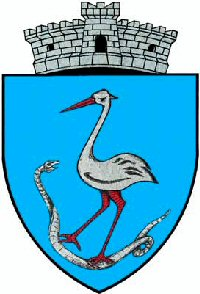
- Coat of arms

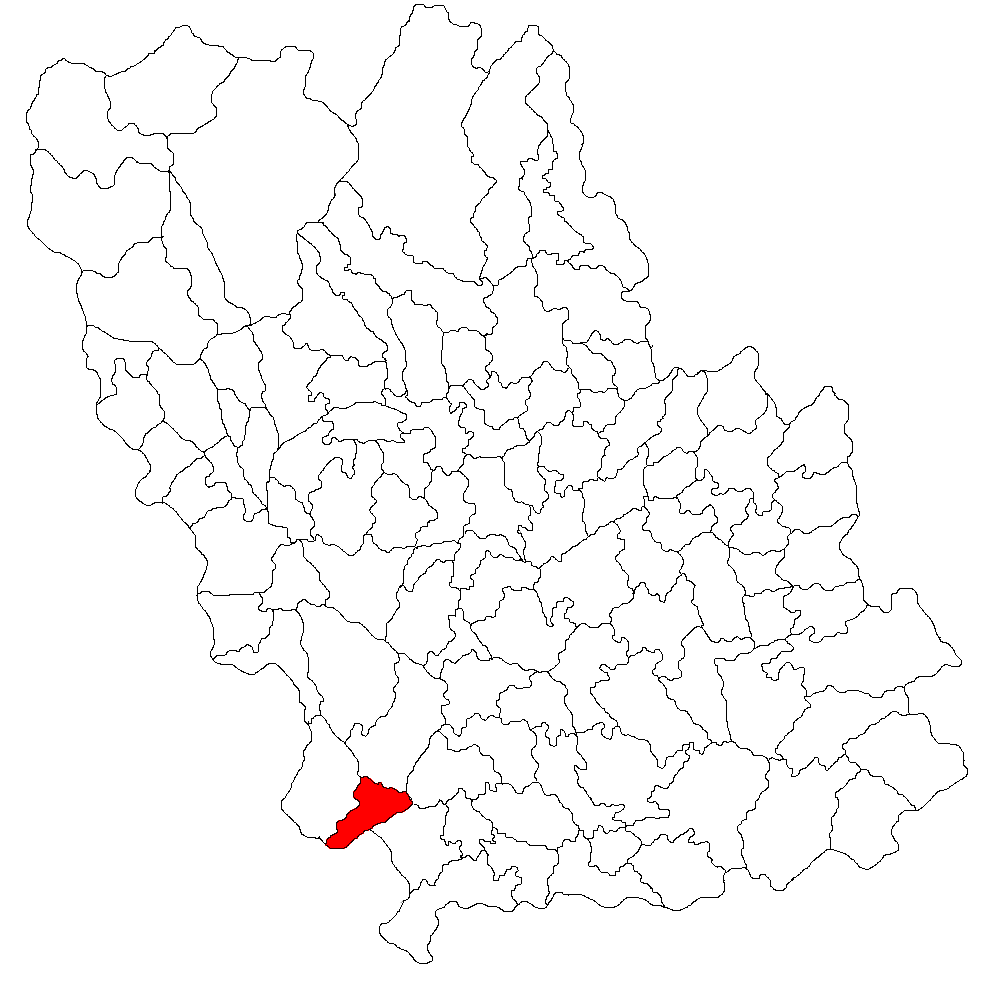
- Location in Prahova County

- Location in Romania
- Coordinates: 44°50′N 25°54′E
- Country: Romania
- County: Prahova

Government
  - Mayor (2020–2024): Marian Stanciu (PSD)
- Area: 26.21 km^{2} (10.12 sq mi)
- Elevation: 155 m (509 ft)
- Population (2021-12-01): 2,681
  - Density: 102.3/km^{2} (264.9/sq mi)
- Time zone: UTC+02:00 (EET)
  - Summer (DST): UTC+03:00 (EEST)
- Postal code: 107379
- Area code: +(40) 244
- Vehicle reg.: PH
- Website: cocorastiicolt.ro

Cocorăștii Colț is a commune in Prahova County, Muntenia, Romania. It is composed of eight villages: Cheșnoiu, Cocorăștii Colț, Cocorăștii Grind, Colțu de Jos, Ghioldum, Perșunari, Piatra, and Satu de Sus. Until 2004, these belonged to Mănești Commune, when they were split off to form a separate commune.

The commune is situated in the Wallachian Plain, on the banks of the rivers Prahova and Cricovul Dulce. The two rivers are connected by the Iazul Morilor Prahova, an old artificial canal built for a succession of water mills, which starts near Florești and flows into the Cricovul Dulce near Ghioldum village.

Cocorăștii Colț is located at the southwestern extremity of Prahova County, 16 km (10 mi) from the county seat, Ploiești, on the border with Dâmbovița County. It is crossed by the national road DN1A, which connects Bucharest, 56 km (35 mi) to the south, to Ploiești through Buftea. This road intersects here with the county road DJ101A, which leads south to Periș and north to Mănești, where it ends in DN72.

Historical population
Year	Pop.	±%
2002	3,146	—
2011	2,837	−9.8%
2021	2,681	−5.5%
Source: Census data
