= Marian Pârșă =

Romanian footballer

Personal information
- Date of birth: 3 March 1986
- Place of birth: Vlădeni, Dâmbovița, Romania
- Date of death: 13 February 2010 (aged 23)
- Place of death: Regensburg, Germany
- Height: 1.83 m (6 ft 0 in)
- Position: Forward

Youth career
- Flacăra Moreni
- Astra Ploiești

Senior career*
Years	Team	Apps	(Gls)
2004–2007	Petrolul Ploiești	35	(8)
2006	→ FCM Târgoviște (loan)	13	(2)
2006–2007	→ Sheriff Tiraspol (loan)	20	(9)
Total		68	(19)
- * Club domestic league appearances and goals

Marian Pârșă (3 March 1986 – 13 February 2010) was a Romanian football forward. He died at age 23, after suffering from cancer. In the last year of his playing career he managed to win one league title and played four games in the 2006–07 UEFA Champions League with Sheriff Tiraspol. His father, Costel was also a footballer who played for Flacăra Moreni and Metalul Plopeni.

== Honours ==
Sheriff Tiraspol

- Moldovan National Division: 2006–07
