= Poienarii Burchii =

- Commune
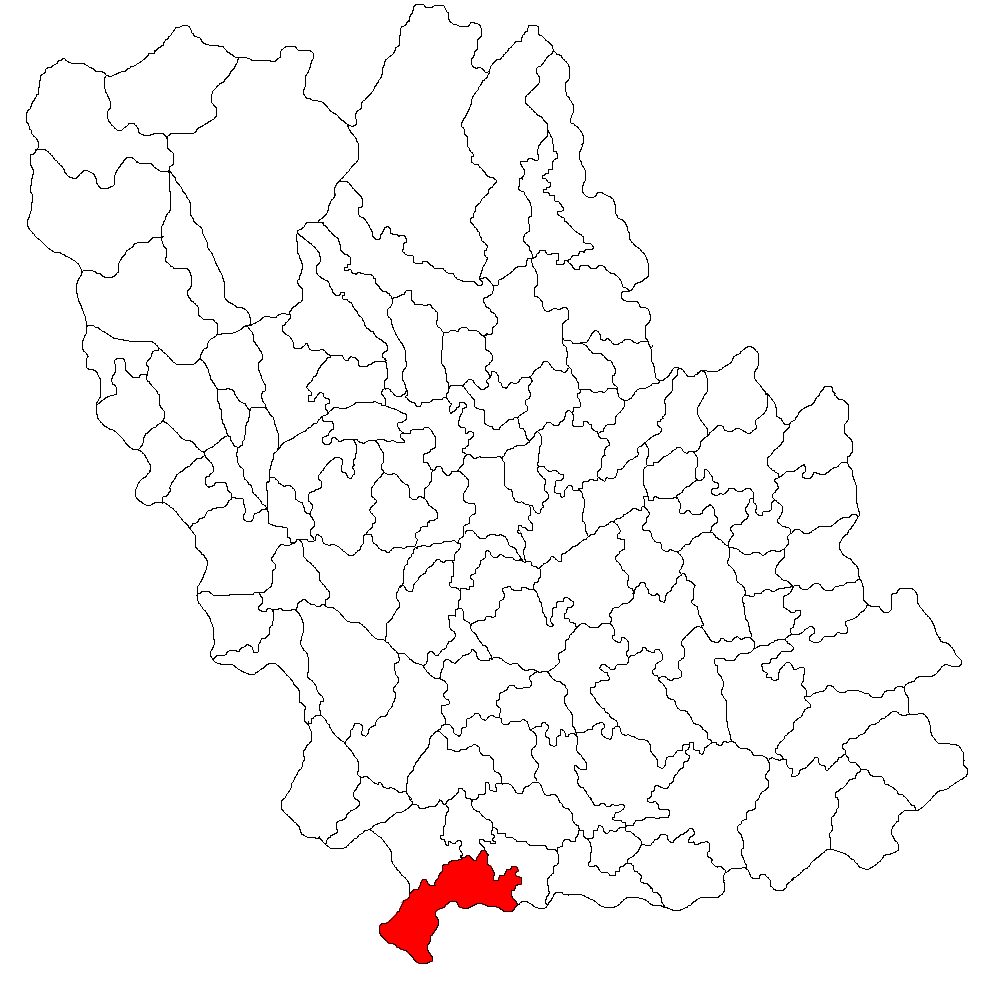
- Location in Prahova County

- Location in Romania
- Coordinates: 44°45′N 26°1′E
- Country: Romania
- County: Prahova

Government
  - Mayor (2020–2024): Ion Gheorghe (PSD)
- Area: 49.07 km^{2} (18.95 sq mi)
- Elevation: 115 m (377 ft)
- Population (2021-12-01): 4,631
  - Density: 94/km^{2} (240/sq mi)
- Time zone: EET/EEST (UTC+2/+3)
- Postal code: 107430
- Area code: +(40) 244
- Vehicle reg.: PH
- Website: primariapoienariiburchii.ro

Poienarii Burchii is a commune in Prahova County, Muntenia, Romania. It is composed of eight villages: Cărbunari, Ologeni, Piorești, Podu Văleni, Poienarii Burchii, Poienarii-Rali, Poienarii Vechi, and Tătărăi.

The commune is situated in the Wallachian Plain, on the banks of the river Cricovul Dulce, which discharges into the Ialomița River in Podu Văleni village. It is located in the southwestern corner of Prahova County, 28 km (17 mi) south of the county seat, Ploiești, on the border with Ilfov and Dâmbovița counties.

Historical population
Year	Pop.	±%
1992	6,582	—
2002	5,829	−11.4%
2011	5,163	−11.4%
2021	4,631	−10.3%
Source: Census data

== Natives ==
- Ștefan Tudor (1943 – 2021), rower
