= Adunați =

Coordinates: 45°11′N 25°36′E

- Commune
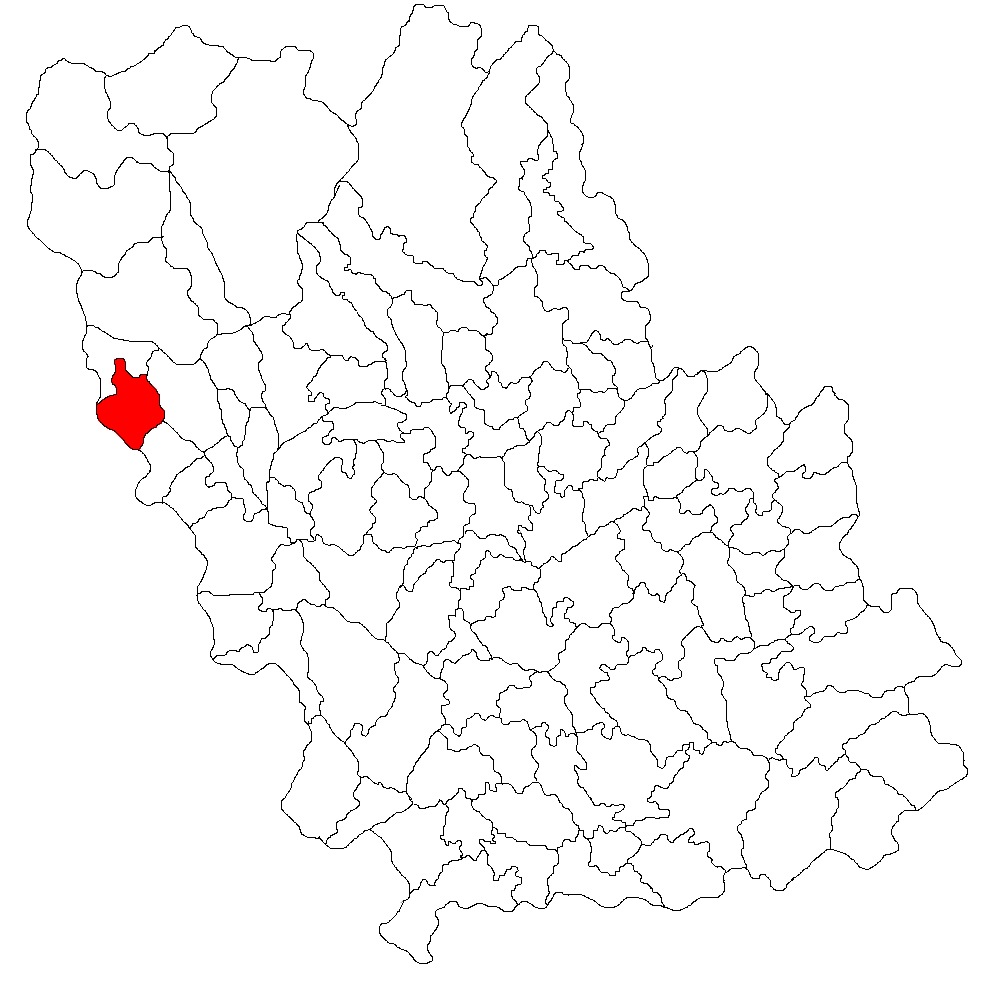
- Location in Prahova County

- Location in Romania
- Coordinates
- Country: Romania
- County: Prahova

Government
  - Mayor (2020–2024): Darius-Mihai Săvulescu (PNL)
- Area: 22.7 km^{2} (8.8 sq mi)
- Elevation: 524 m (1,719 ft)
- Population (2021-12-01): 1,896
  - Density: 84/km^{2} (220/sq mi)
- Time zone: EET/EEST (UTC+2/+3)
- Postal code: 107005
- Area code: +(40) 244
- Vehicle reg.: PH
- Website: www.primaria-adunati.ro

Adunați is a commune in Prahova County, Muntenia, Romania. It is composed of three villages: Adunați, Ocina de Jos, and Ocina de Sus.

The commune is located in the western part of the county, 50 km (31 mi) northwest of the county seat, Ploiești. It lies just west of Breaza, on the border with Dâmbovița County. The river Provița flows through all three villages comprising the commune.

Historical population
Year	Pop.	±%
1992	2,497	—
2002	2,278	−8.8%
2011	2,104	−7.6%
2021	1,896	−9.9%
Source: Census data
