= Dărmănești, Dâmbovița =

Dărmănești
- Commune
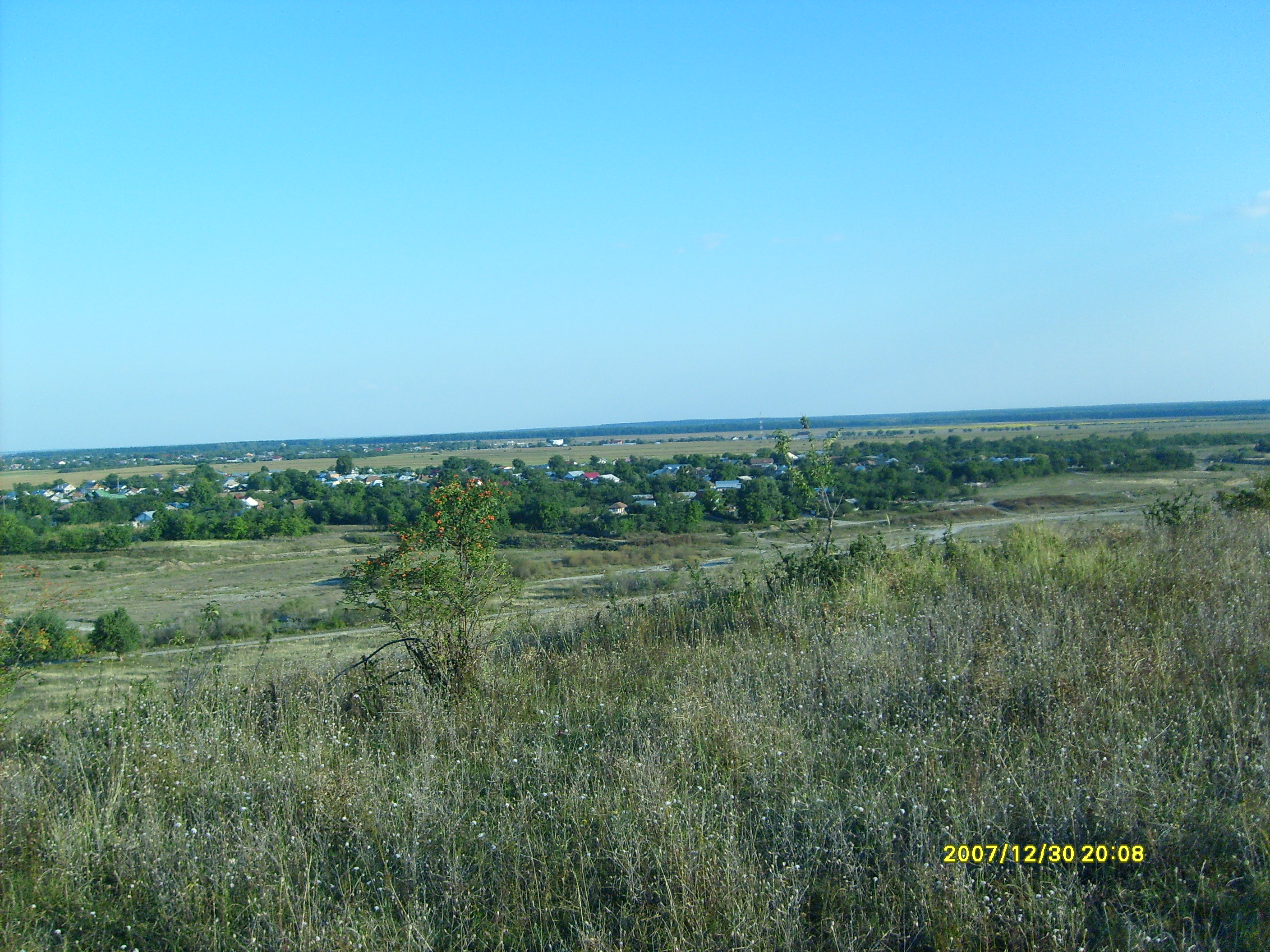
- Mărginenii de Sus

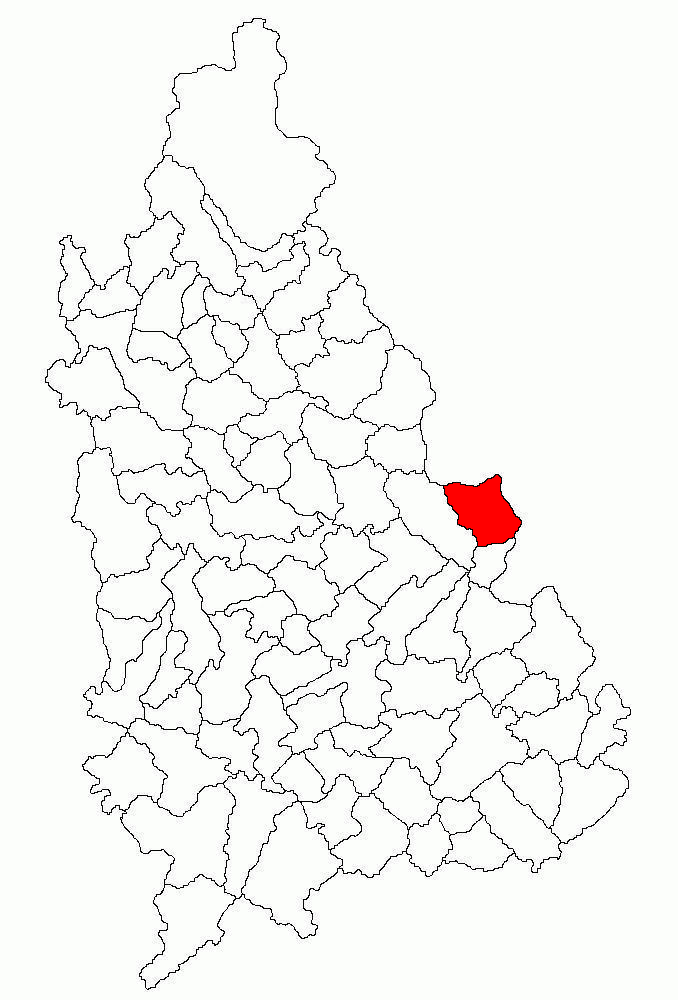
- Location in Dâmbovița County

- Location in Romania
- Coordinates: 44°55′N 25°46′E
- Country: Romania
- County: Dâmbovița

Government
  - Mayor (2024–2028): Valentin Mihalache (PNL)
- Area: 33.14 km^{2} (12.80 sq mi)
- Elevation: 224 m (735 ft)
- Population (2021-12-01): 4,433
  - Density: 133.8/km^{2} (346.5/sq mi)
- Time zone: UTC+02:00 (EET)
  - Summer (DST): UTC+03:00 (EEST)
- Postal code: 137185
- Area code: +(40) 245
- Vehicle reg.: DB
- Website: www.primaria-darmanesti.ro

Dărmănești is a commune in Dâmbovița County, Muntenia, Romania with a population of 4,433 people as of 2021. The commune is located in southern Romania. It is composed of two villages, Dărmănești and Mărginenii de Sus. It also included Vlădeni village until 2003, when it was split off to form a separate commune.

Historical population
Year	Pop.	±%
2002	5,048	—
2011	4,810	−4.7%
2021	4,433	−7.8%
Source: Census data
