= Vlădeni, Dâmbovița =

Vlădeni
- Commune
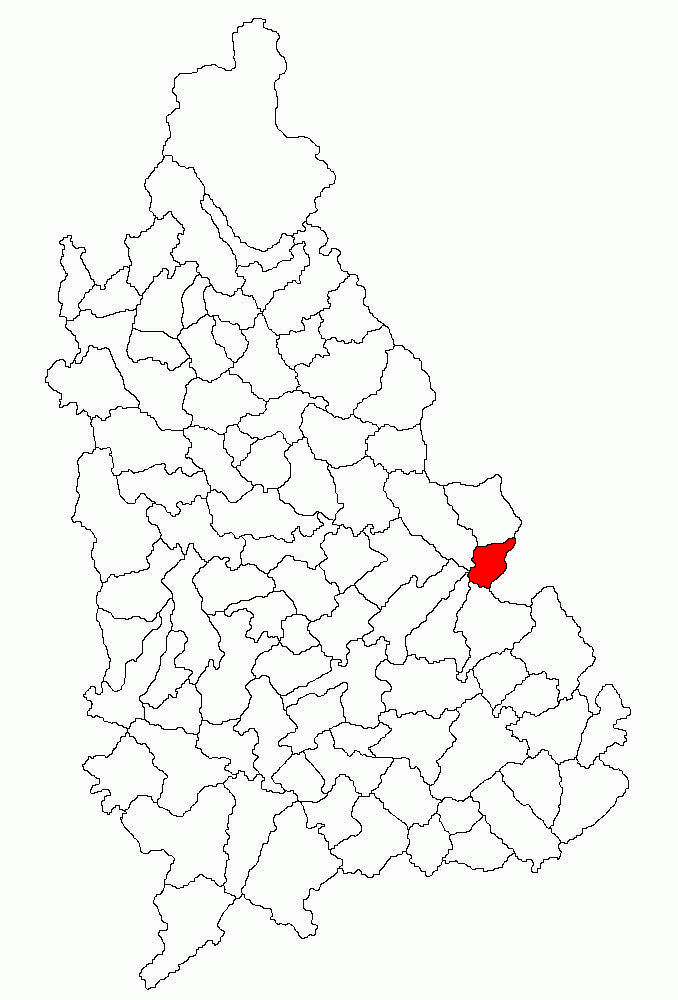
- Location in Dâmbovița County

- Location in Romania
- Coordinates: 44°52′32″N 25°46′31″E
- Country: Romania
- County: Dâmbovița

Government
  - Mayor (2020–2024): Maria Poșircă (PSD)
- Area: 28.77 km^{2} (11.11 sq mi)
- Elevation: 193 m (633 ft)
- Population (2021-12-01): 2,699
  - Density: 93.81/km^{2} (243.0/sq mi)
- Time zone: UTC+02:00 (EET)
  - Summer (DST): UTC+03:00 (EEST)
- Postal code: 137187
- Area code: +(40) 245
- Vehicle reg.: DB
- Website: www.primariavladeni.ro

Vlădeni is a commune in Dâmbovița County, Muntenia, Romania. It is composed of a single village, Vlădeni, part of Dărmănești Commune until 2003, when it was split off.

Historical population
Year	Pop.	±%
2002	2,960	—
2011	2,807	−5.2%
2021	2,699	−3.8%
Source: Census data

== Natives ==
- Marian Pârșă (1986–2010), footballer
