= Mănești, Prahova =

Mănești
- Commune
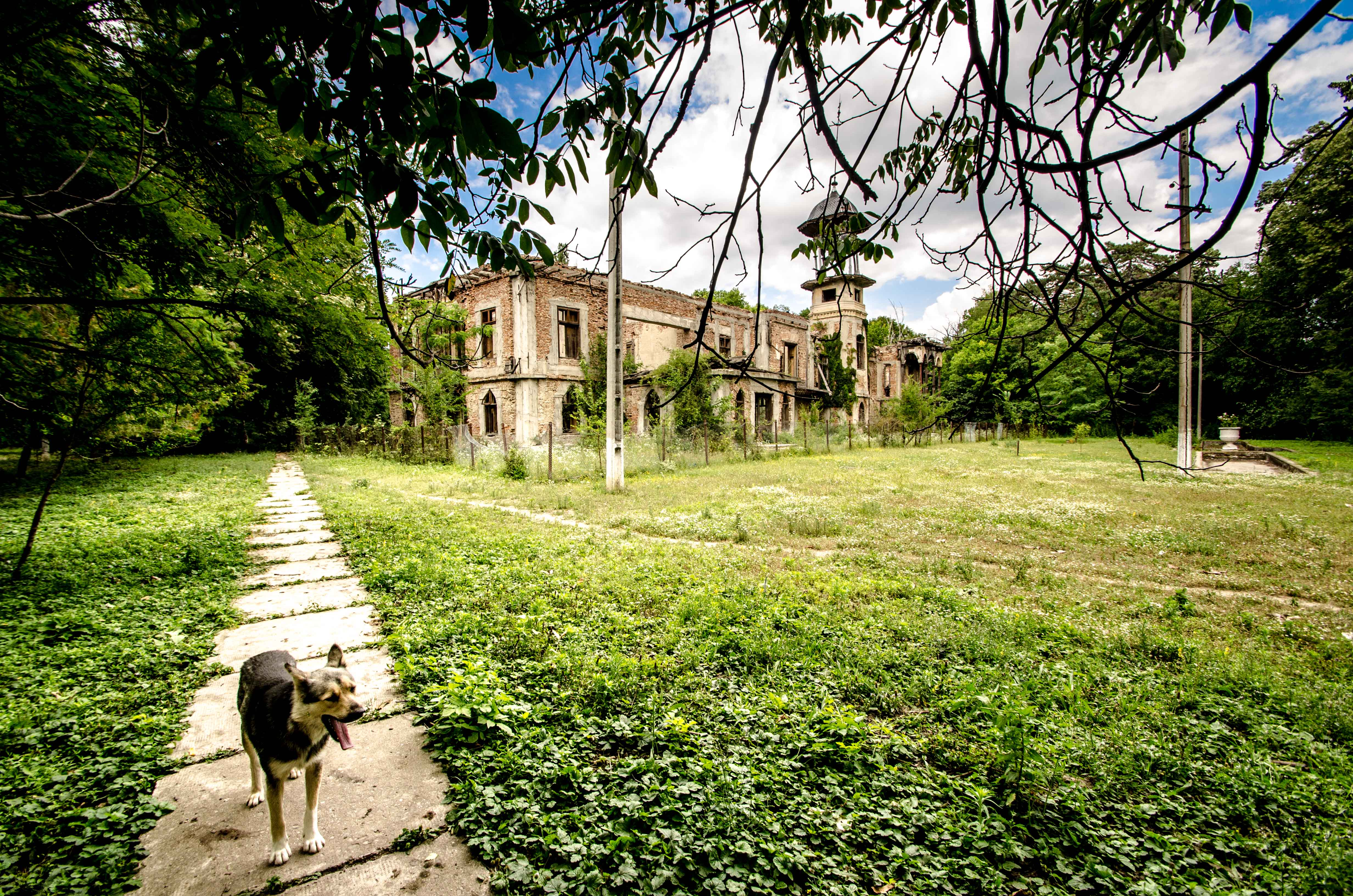
- The Văcărescu-Calimachi Castle in Mănești village

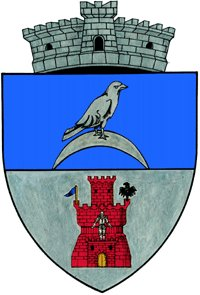
- Coat of arms

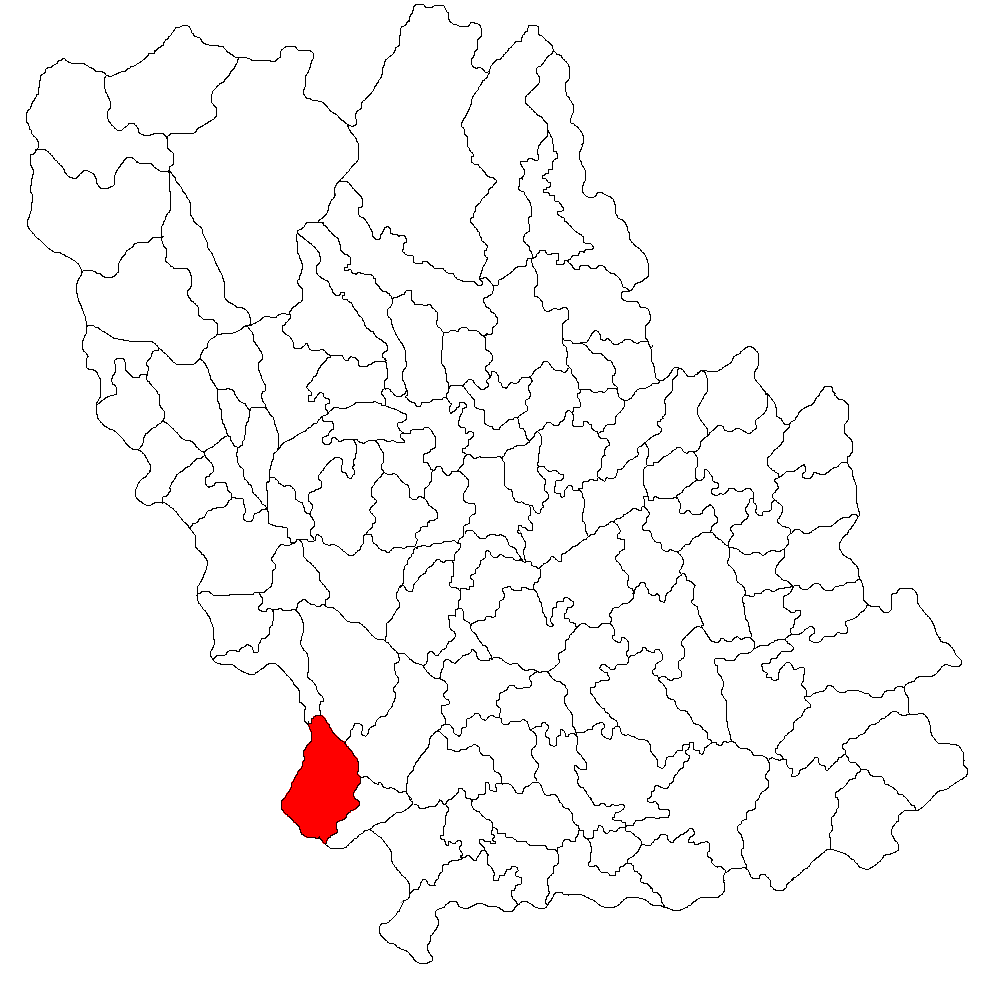
- Location in Prahova County

- Location in Romania
- Coordinates: 44°52′N 25°51′E
- Country: Romania
- County: Prahova

Government
  - Mayor (2020–2024): Constantin Nițoi (PNL)
- Area: 48.35 km^{2} (18.67 sq mi)
- Elevation: 188 m (617 ft)
- Population (2021-12-01): 3,551
  - Density: 73.44/km^{2} (190.2/sq mi)
- Time zone: UTC+02:00 (EET)
  - Summer (DST): UTC+03:00 (EEST)
- Postal code: 107375
- Area code: +(40) 244
- Vehicle reg.: PH
- Website: primaria-manesti.ro

Mănești is a commune in Prahova County, Muntenia, Romania. It is composed of five villages: Băltița, Coada Izvorului, Gura Crivățului, Mănești, and Zalhanaua. It also included eight other villages until 2004, when they were split off to form Cocorăștii Colț Commune.

Historical population
Year	Pop.	±%
2002	4,165	—
2011	3,994	−4.1%
2021	3,551	−11.1%
Source: Census data
