= Bătrâneanca =

- Location within Romania

Location
- Country: Romania
- Counties: Prahova County
- Villages: Poiana Mare, Bătrâni

Physical characteristics
- Mouth: Stâmnic
  - location: Starchiojd
  - coordinates: 45.3123°N 26.1862°E
- Length: 13 km (8.1 mi)
- Basin size: 35 km^{2} (14 sq mi)

Basin features
- Progression: Stâmnic→ Bâsca Chiojdului→ Buzău→ Siret→ Danube→ Black Sea

The Bătrâneanca is a right tributary of the river Stâmnic in Romania. Its length is 13 km (8.1 mi) and its basin size is 35 km^{2} (14 sq mi). It flows into the Stâmnic in Cătina.
