= Pătârlagele =

- Town
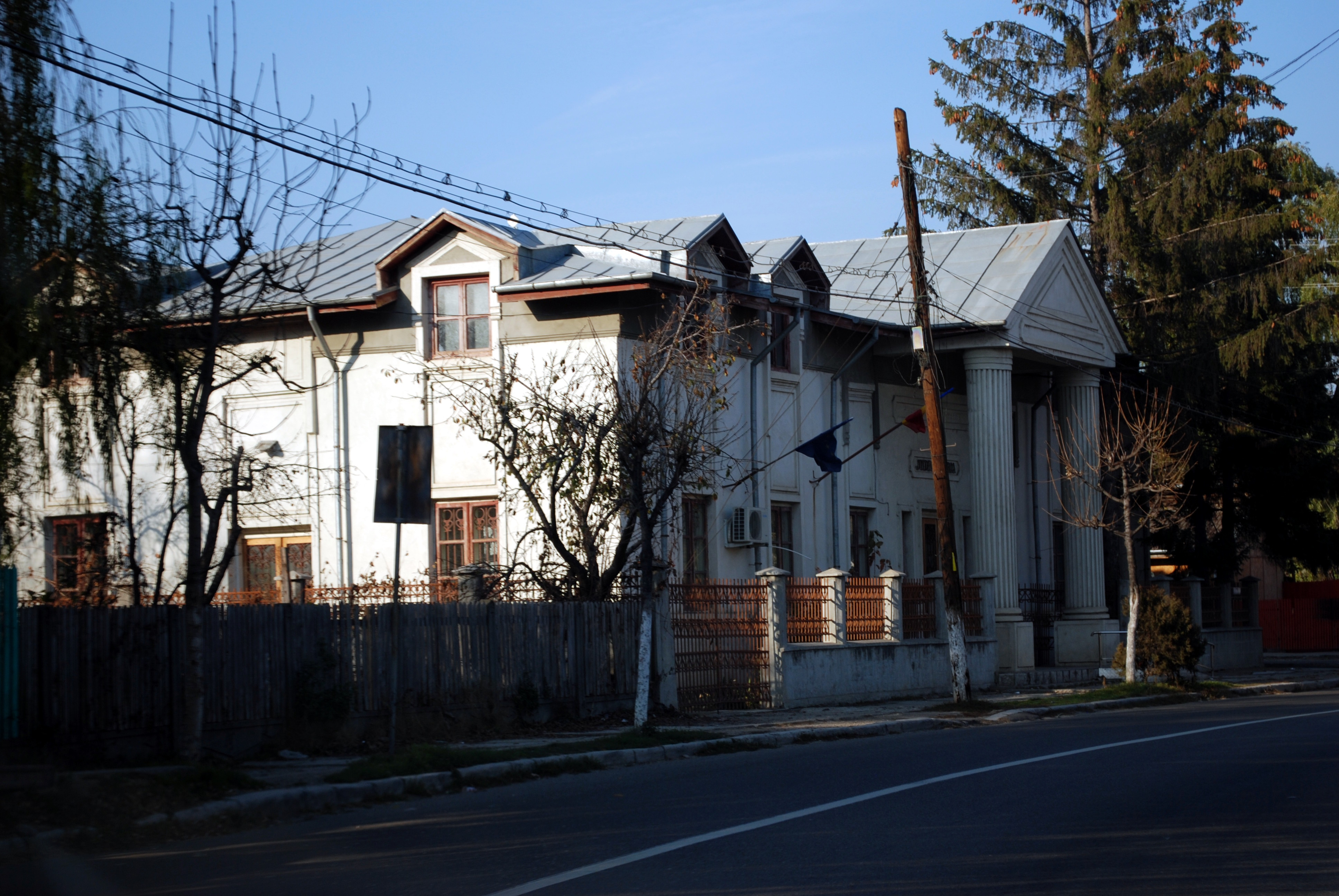
- The Pătârlagele courthouse

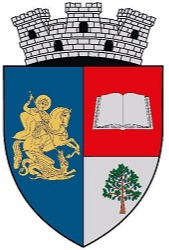
- Coat of arms

- Location in Romania
- Coordinates: 45°19′8″N 26°21′35″E
- Country: Romania
- County: Buzău

Government
  - Mayor (2024–2028): Ion Gherghiceanu (PSD)
- Area: 80.45 km^{2} (31.06 sq mi)
- Elevation: 288 m (945 ft)
- Population (2021-12-01): 6,276
  - Density: 78.01/km^{2} (202.0/sq mi)
- Time zone: UTC+02:00 (EET)
  - Summer (DST): UTC+03:00 (EEST)
- Postal code: 127430
- Area code: +(40) 238
- Vehicle reg.: BZ
- Website: www.primariapatarlagele.ro

Pătârlagele (also spelled Pătîrlagele; pronounced [pətɨrˈlad͡ʒele]) is a town in Buzău County, Muntenia, Romania. At the 2021 census it had a population of 6,276.

== Geography ==
Pătârlagele is located in the western part of the county, along the national road DN10 connecting Buzău and Brașov. It lies in the Pătârlagele hollow, between the Carpathian Mountains and the Subcarpathian Hills.

The town administers fourteen villages: Calea Chiojdului, Crâng, Fundăturile, Gornet, Lunca, Mănăstirea, Mărunțișu, Mușcel, Poienile, Sibiciu de Sus, Stroești, Valea Lupului, Valea Sibiciului, and Valea Viei.

== Neighbours ==
- The Colți and Bozioru communes, to the north
- The Pănătău and Cozieni communes, to the east
- The Cislău commune, to the south
- The Cătina, Calvini, and Chiojdu communes, to the west

== History ==
Historical population
Year	Pop.	±%
2002	8,290	—
2011	7,135	−13.9%
2021	6,276	−12.0%
Source: Census data

The first evidence of the existence of the Pătârlagele commune dates back from 1524–1527, but it probably existed before the establishment of the medieval state of Wallachia.

The name Pătârlagele comes from the German form of the name Peter (in Romanian, Petre or Petru), and the German word lager, meaning camp. The German origin of the name can only be explained by the presence of the Teutonic knights on the other side of the Carpathians, in Burzenland, during the years 1211–1225 and their conquest of the Buzău Mountains, where they raised fortifications against the Cumans.

Pătârlagele Commune received town rights in 2004.

== Notable people ==
- Coca Andronescu (1932–1998), stage, television, and film actress
