= Zeletin =

Zeletin may refer to:

== Places in Romania ==
- Zeletin, a village in Cătina Commune, Buzău County
- Ariceștii Zeletin, a commune in Prahova County
- Zeletin (Bâsca Chiojdului), a river in Prahova and Buzău Counties
- Zeletin (Berheci), a river in Bacău, Vrancea and Galați Counties

== People ==
- C. D. Zeletin (b. 1935), poet and doctor
- Ion Popescu-Zeletin (1907–1974), forestry engineer
- Radu Popescu-Zeletin (b. 1947), computer scientist
- Ștefan Zeletin (1882–1934), economist and philosopher
