= Cerașu =

- Commune
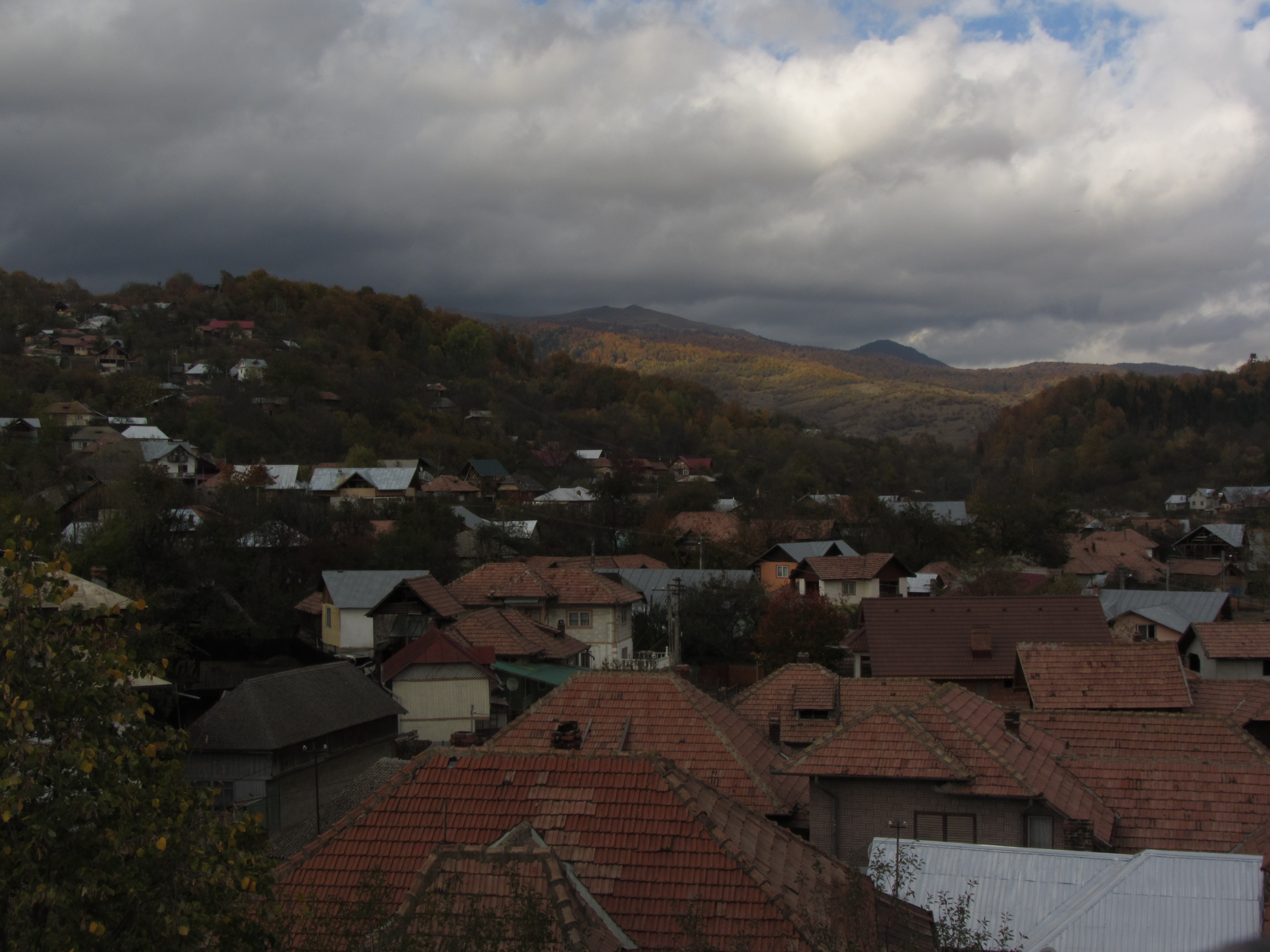
- View of Slon village

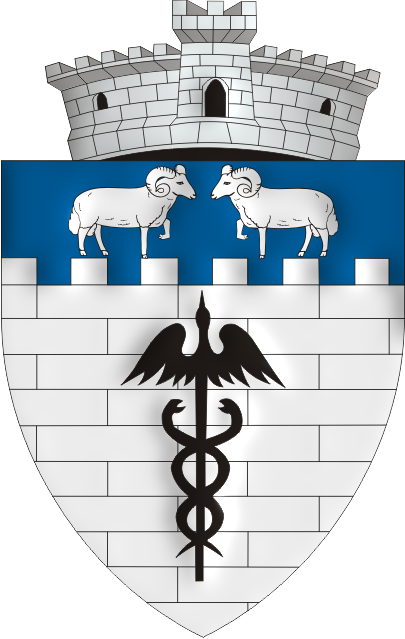
- Coat of arms

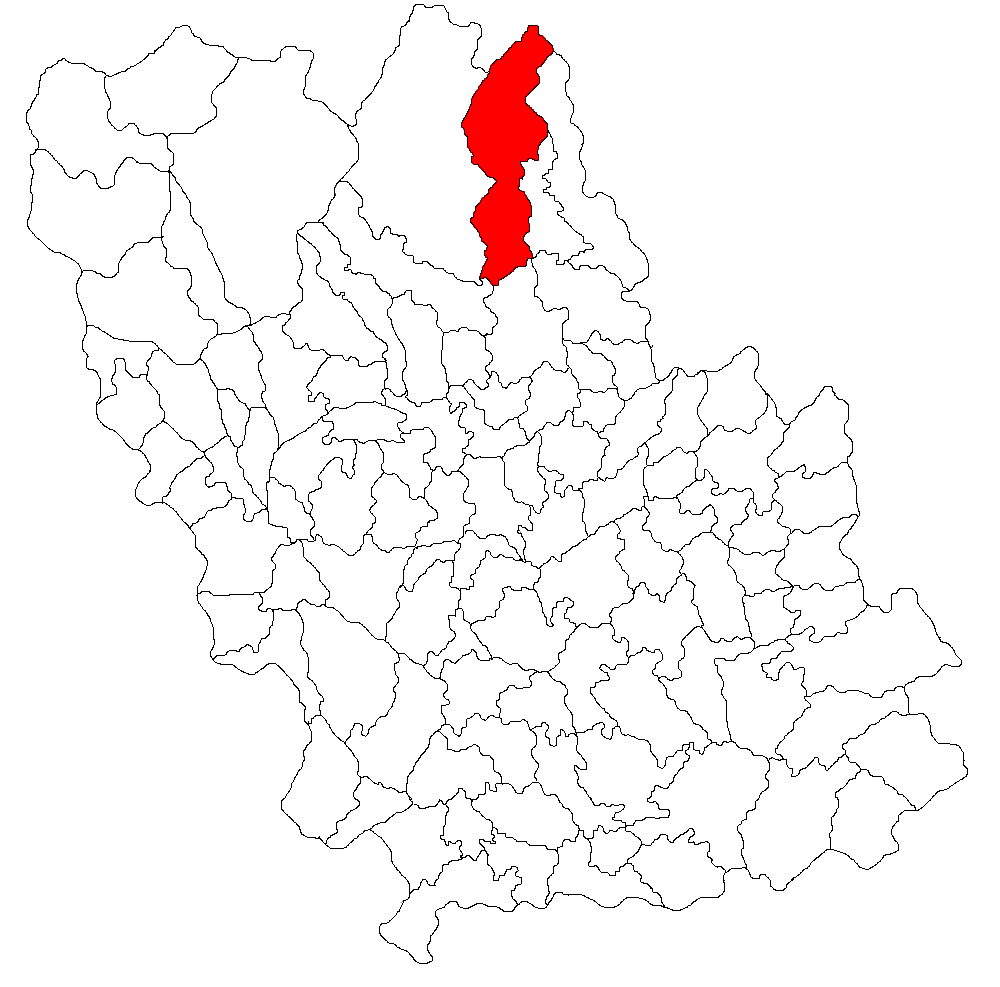
- Location in Prahova County

- Location in Romania
- Coordinates: 45°19′N 26°02′E
- Country: Romania
- County: Prahova

Government
  - Mayor (2020–2024): Alin-Remus Staicu (PNL)
- Area: 120.7 km^{2} (46.6 sq mi)
- Elevation: 570 m (1,870 ft)
- Population (2021-12-01): 4,196
  - Density: 34.76/km^{2} (90.04/sq mi)
- Time zone: UTC+02:00 (EET)
  - Summer (DST): UTC+03:00 (EEST)
- Postal code: 107140
- Area code: +(40) 244
- Vehicle reg.: PH
- Website: primariacerasu.ro

Cerașu is a commune in Prahova County, Muntenia, Romania. It is composed of six villages: Cerașu, Slon, Valea Borului, Valea Brădetului, Valea Lespezii, and Valea Tocii.

Cerașu borders the following communes: Chiojdu (Buzău County) and Vama Buzăului (Brașov County) to the north; Măneciu to the west; Izvoarele and Drajna to the south; and Posești, Bătrâni, and Starchiojd to the east.

Historical population
Year	Pop.	±%
1992	5,289	—
2002	5,190	−1.9%
2011	4,628	−10.8%
2021	4,196	−9.3%
Source: Census data
