= Giurescu =

Giurescu is a Romanian surname that may refer to:

- Constantin Giurescu (historian) (1875–1918), historian
- Constantin C. Giurescu (1901–1977), historian, son of Constantin Giurescu
- Dinu C. Giurescu (1927–2018), historian, son of Constantin C. Giurescu
