= Stâmnic =

Stâmnic Chiojd
- Location within Romania

Location
- Country: Romania
- Counties: Prahova, Buzău
- Villages: Starchiojd, Rotarea, Cătina

Physical characteristics
- Mouth: Bâsca Chiojdului
  - location: Cătina
  - coordinates: 45.2978°N 26.2395°E
- Length: 12 km (7.5 mi)
- Basin size: 69 km^{2} (27 sq mi)

Basin features
- Progression: Bâsca Chiojdului→ Buzău→ Siret→ Danube→ Black Sea
- Tributaries
  - right: Bătrâneanca

The Stâmnic (also: Chiojd) is a right tributary of the river Bâsca Chiojdului in Romania. Its length is 12 km (7.5 mi) and its basin size is 69 km^{2} (27 sq mi). It flows into the Bâsca Chiojdului in Cătina.
