= Plescioara (disambiguation) =

Plescioara may refer to the following places in Romania:

- Plescioara, a tributary of the river Jaleș in Gorj County
- Plescioara, a tributary of the river Bâsca Chiojdului in Buzău County
- Plescioara, a village in the commune Chiojdu, Buzău County
