= Drajna (disambiguation) =

Drajna may refer to several places in Romania:

- Drajna, a commune in Prahova County
- Drajna Nouă, a village in Dragalina Commune, Călărași County
- Drajna (river), a tributary of the Teleajen in Prahova County
