= Sibiciu =

Sibiciu may refer to one of two places in Buzău County, Romania:

- Sibiciu de Jos, a village in Pănătău Commune
- Sibiciu de Sus, a village in Pătârlagele town

== Rivers ==
- Sibiciu River
