= Bâsca (disambiguation) =

Bâsca may refer to several rivers and settlements in Romania:

- Bâsca (also Bâsca Roziliei), a tributary of the river Buzău
- Bâsca Mică, a tributary of the river Bâsca
- Bâsca Mare, the upper course of the river Bâsca
- Bâsca Chiojdului, a tributary of the river Buzău
- Bâsca Chiojdului, a village in the commune Chiojdu
