= Zaharești =

Zahareşti may refer to several villages in Romania:

- Zahareşti, a village in Pănătău Commune, Buzău County
- Zahareşti, a village in Stroiești, Suceava Commune, Suceava County
