= Colnic River =

Colnic River may refer to the following rivers in Romania

- Colnic - tributary of the Bâsca Chiojdului River

== See also ==
- Colnic, a village in Argeș County, Romania
