= Ariceștii =

Ariceștii may refer to one of two communes in Prahova County, Romania:

- Ariceștii Rahtivani
- Ariceștii Zeletin
