= Drajna (river) =

- Location within Romania

Location
- Country: Romania
- Counties: Prahova County

Physical characteristics
- Mouth: Teleajen
  - location: Drajna de Jos
  - coordinates: 45.2079°N 26.0527°E
- Length: 25 km (16 mi)
- Basin size: 106 km^{2} (41 sq mi)

Basin features
- Progression: Teleajen→ Prahova→ Ialomița→ Danube→ Black Sea
- Tributaries
  - left: Ogretineanca

The Drajna is a left tributary of the river Teleajen in Romania. It discharges into the Teleajen in Piatra. It flows through the villages Slon, Valea Lespezii, Cerașu, Valea Borului, Podurile, Drajna, Pițigoi and Drajna de Jos. Its length is 25 km (16 mi) and its basin size is 106 km^{2} (41 sq mi).
