= Chiojdu =

- Commune
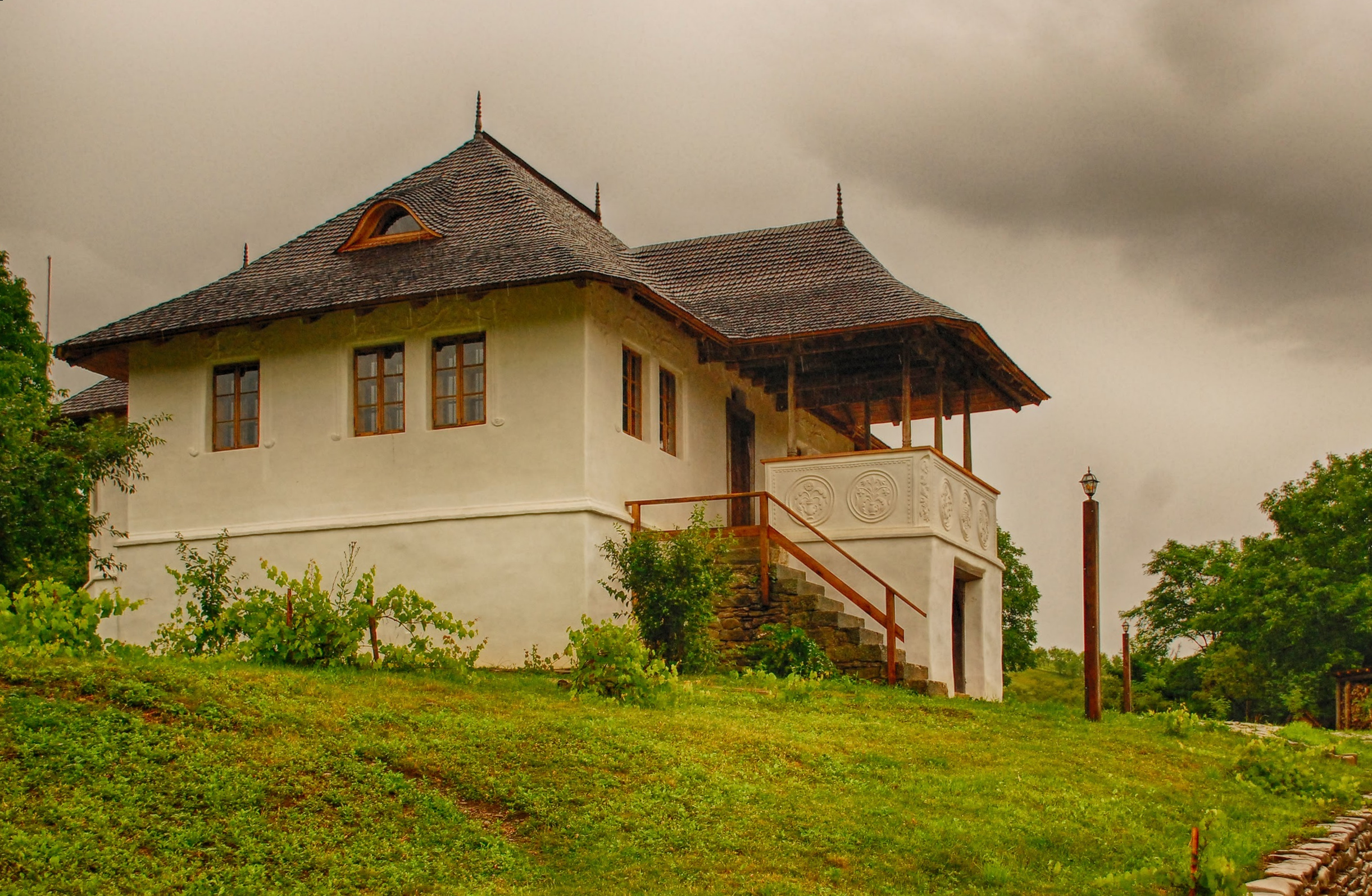
- House with Blazons

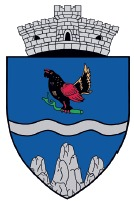
- Coat of arms

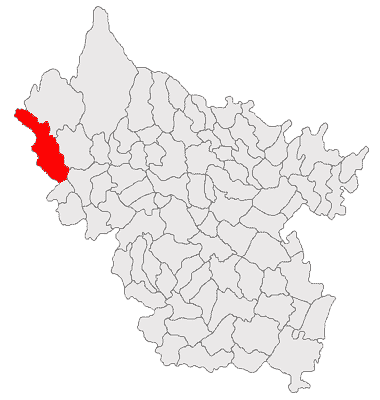
- Location in Buzău County

- Location in Romania
- Coordinates: 45°21′21″N 26°12′53″E
- Country: Romania
- County: Buzău
- Subdivisions: Bâsca Chiojdului, Cătiașu, Chiojdu, Lera, Plescioara, Poienițe

Government
  - Mayor (2020–2024): Gheorghe Neamțu (PNL)
- Area: 128.41 km^{2} (49.58 sq mi)
- Elevation: 464 m (1,522 ft)
- Population (2021-12-01): 2,950
  - Density: 23.0/km^{2} (59.5/sq mi)
- Time zone: UTC+02:00 (EET)
  - Summer (DST): UTC+03:00 (EEST)
- Postal code: 127170
- Area code: +(40) 238
- Vehicle reg.: BZ
- Website: chiojdu.ro

Chiojdu (Romanian pronunciation: [ˈkjoʒdu]) is a commune in the northwestern hill and mountainside region of Buzău County, Muntenia, Romania. Made up of six villages (Bâsca Chiojdului, Cătiașu, Chiojdu, Lera, Plescioara and Poenițele) on the bank of the river Bâsca Chiojdului, a small tributary of the Buzău, it is the center of a region known for the good preservation of old traditions and folk art, especially the particular architectural style of the houses.

== Location ==
Chiojdu is located in the Chiojdu Hollow, in the sub-Carpathian hills at the south-eastern curvature of the Carpathian Mountains. The commune's inhabited regions are located to its south, in the valley of the Bâsca Chiojdului, but its administrative territory extends northwards into the mountains, to the Siriu Peak (1654 m), the highest altitude in Chiojdu.

The commune's neighbors are: Prahova County (Starchiojd and Cerașu communes) to the West, Brașov and Covasna counties (Vama Buzăului and Sita Buzăului communes, respectively) to the North, Siriu and Nehoiu to the East, Pătârlagele and Cătina to the South.

== History ==
The earliest known written document mentioning Chiojdu is dated 10 July 1418. It is an act of voivod Michael I of Wallachia by which he acknowledges ownership of the land in Chiojdu to the local yeomen.

=== Legend ===
There is also a legend explaining the foundation of the Chiojdu village. It speaks of a wealthy Transylvanian peasant named Chiojd who lost all his family and possessions in a fire and started to wander around the mountains. Once he arrived in the present-day location of the Chiojdu village, he decided to settle down. The beauty of the place helped him move away from the sadness of losing his wife and his home. He eventually married a woman named Bâsca and they had two boys, Chiojdu Mare and Chiojdu Mic and a girl named Chojdeanca, who went on to found the villages that kept their names.

== Architecture ==
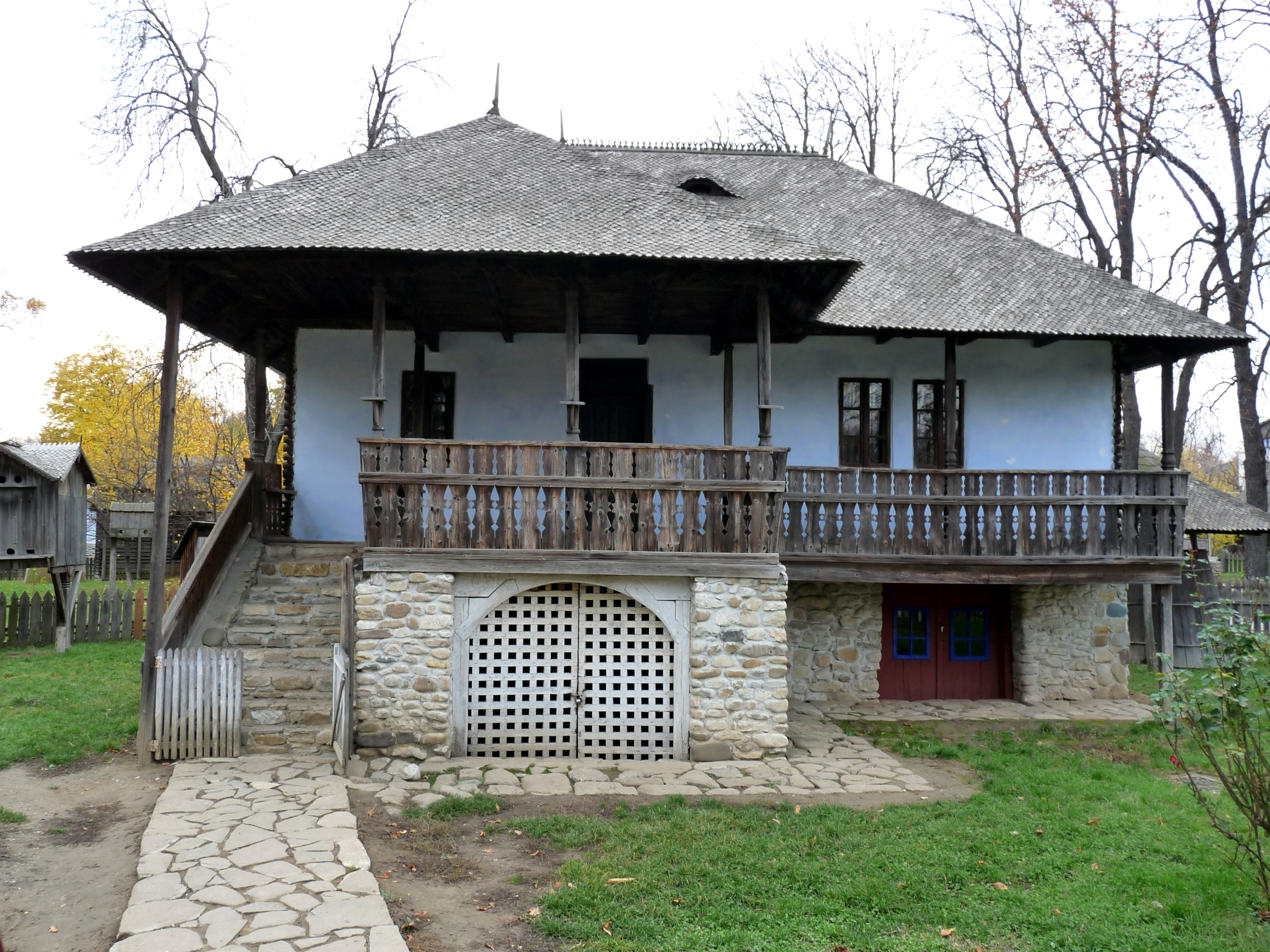
A typical house from Chiojdu, at the Village Museum in Bucharest

Chiojdu is a very representative area for the folk architecture of the Carpathians' curvature region. A typical Chiojdu house design features a high porch on top of a cellar entrance on its facade. The basement, typically built of stone, houses cellars where food and wine are stored. The top floor can be made of wood, clay or bricks and is split into several inhabited rooms.

Such a house from the Chiojdu region is part of the open-air exhibition at the Village Museum in Bucharest. Also, the Vergu-Mănăilă House and the restaurant in Crâng Park, both buildings located in Buzău, share the same basic architectural features.

Historical population
Year	Pop.	±%
2002	3,842	—
2011	3,509	−8.7%
2021	2,950	−15.9%
Source: Census data

== Notable natives ==
- Constantin Giurescu (1875–1918), historian
