= Cislău =

- Commune
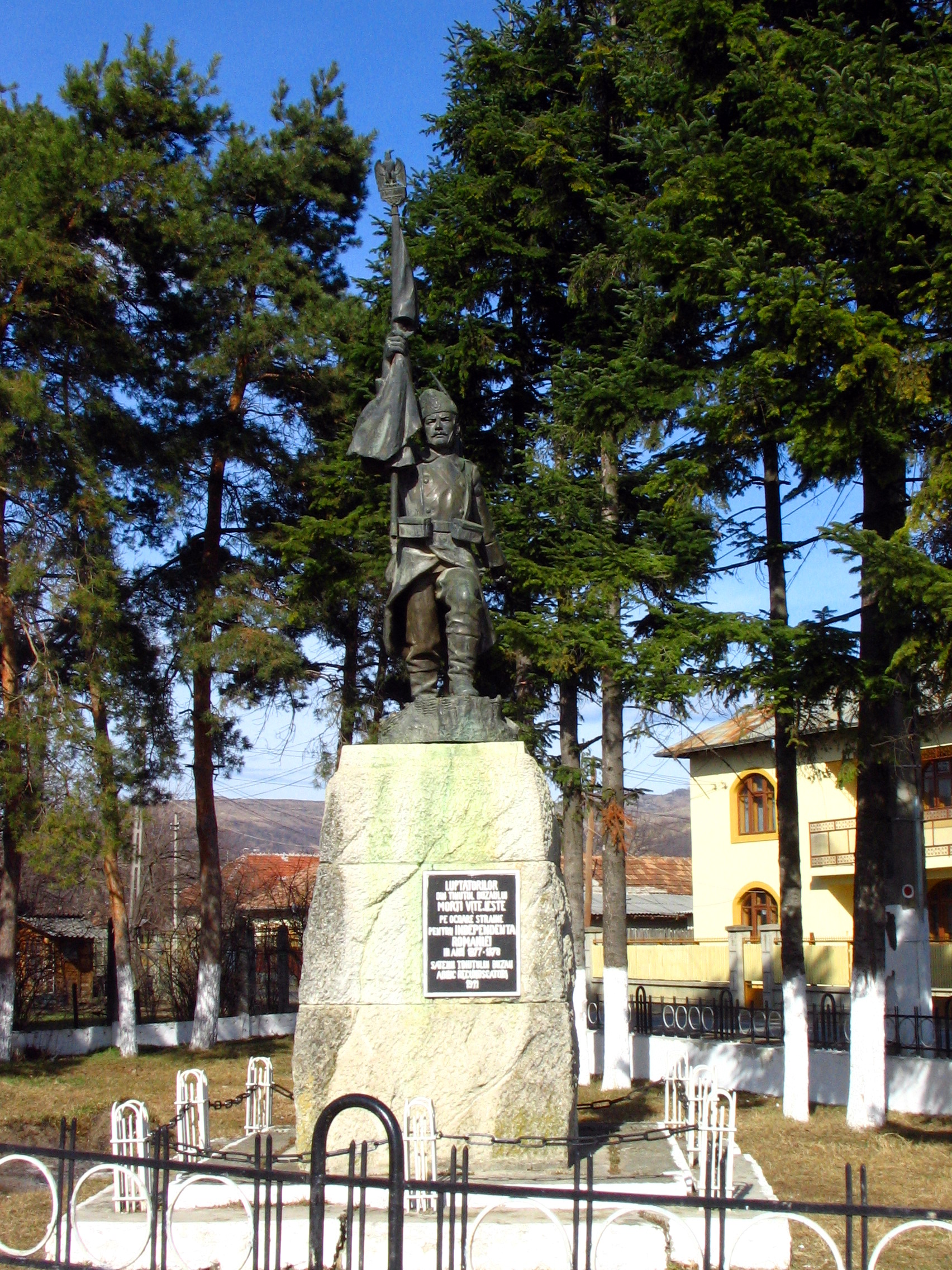
- Monument dedicated to the Romanian War of Independence heroes, located in Cislău

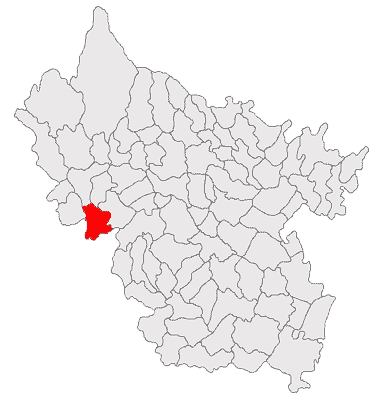
- Location in Buzău County

- Location in Romania
- Coordinates: 45°15′N 26°22′E
- Country: Romania
- County: Buzău
- Subdivisions: Bărăști, Buda Crăciunești, Cislău, Gura Bâscii, Scărișoara

Government
  - Mayor (2020–2024): Dumitru Mitroiu (PSD)
- Area: 61.2 km^{2} (23.6 sq mi)
- Elevation: 365 m (1,198 ft)
- Population (2021-12-01): 4,218
  - Density: 68.9/km^{2} (179/sq mi)
- Time zone: UTC+02:00 (EET)
  - Summer (DST): UTC+03:00 (EEST)
- Postal code: 127185
- Area code: +(40) 238
- Vehicle reg.: BZ
- Website: primariacislau.ro

Cislău (Romanian pronunciation: [t͡ʃisˈləw]) is a commune in Buzău County, Muntenia, Romania, in the valley of the river Buzău. It is composed of five villages: Bărăști, Buda Crăciunești, Cislău, Gura Bâscei, and Scărișoara.

The largest of the villages is Cislău with 2,305 people registered in 2009. The corresponding numbers for the other four villages in 2009 were: Bărăști 541 people, Buda Crăciunești 920 people, Gura Bâscei 389 people, and Scărișoara 877 people.

The commune is positioned on the Buzău River at the point where it is joined by the Chiojdului River. In terms of the road network, it is on the National Highway DN10 between Buzău (approximately 52 km (32 mi) away) and Brașov (approximately 110 km (68 mi) away). In one of the commune's villages, Gura Bâscei, Local Road CJ102B leads off the main road linking to the Zeletin Valley and Vălenii de Munte.

Historical population
Year	Pop.	±%
2002	5,032	—
2011	4,697	−6.7%
2021	4,218	−10.2%
Source: Census data
