= Dumitru Enescu =

Romanian geophysicist

Dumitru Enescu (21 June 1930 – 12 August 2012). was a Romanian geophysicist and engineer elected honorary member of the Romanian Academy in 2011. He was born in Drajna de Sus, and died in Bucharest, aged 82. Dumitru Enescu has made important scientific contributions to the development of seismology in Romania.

== Biography ==
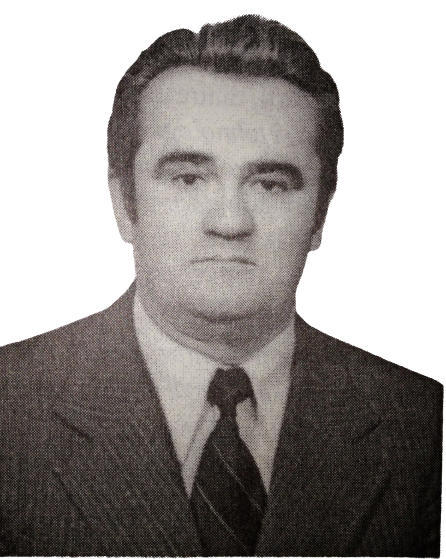
Dumitru Enescu

Dumitru Enescu was born on June 21, 1930, in the village of Drajna de Sus, Drajna commune, Prahova county, son of Neculai and Eugenia Enescu. He attended the high school "Petru and Pavel" in Ploiesti, and, after graduation, enrolled at the Institute of Mines, Faculty of Geology (which later became the current Faculty of Geology and Geophysics, within the University of Bucharest), Geophysics Department, from where he graduated in 1954.

After graduating from college, Dumitru Enescu was hired in March 1955 by the Geological Survey Institute of Romania, where he conducted geophysical prospecting work. In January 1957, he transferred to the Seismology Department of the Romanian Academy. Due to the frequent organizational changes, the Seismology Department has functioned in several institutions: the Romanian Academy, the Institute of Applied Geophysics, the Geological Institute of Romania, the Center for Earth Physics, the National Institute for Earth Physics (NIEP), and, since 1996, National Institute of Research and Development for Earth Physics (NIEP). He held all the positions from simple researcher to chief-researcher grade I, from head of laboratory to head of section and then director and general manager of NIEP (between 1990 and 2000). He received his doctorate in 1961, with the doctoral thesis entitled "Study and applications of secondary seismic waves recorded at some earthquakes in Vrancea" (in Romanian), having Academician Professor Gheorghe Demetrescu as scientific advisor. Dumitru Enescu continued his specialization in seismology at the Institute of Geophysics in Prague (in 1964) and at the Geophysical Institute, in Karlsruhe (in 1977).

In parallel with the scientific activity, Dumitru Enescu was also active as an educator. He held the position of assistant professor (1957–1962) and associate professor (1963–1969) at the Faculty of Geology, in Bucharest. He was certified as a PhD supervisor in 1967, at the Faculty of Geology, where he worked in this capacity until 1990. In 1990 he was again certified as a PhD supervisor at the Institute of Atomic Physics (IFA) and then at the Faculty of Physics, University of Bucharest, also acquiring the quality of professor. During his career, he has successfully supervised more than 30 PhD students.

In 1957 he married engineer Corina Enescu (former Andreescu), from Beciu commune, Buzau county; the only child, Bogdan Dumitru Enescu, is currently an associate professor (Seismology) at Kyoto University, Japan.

Dumitru Enescu died on August 12, 2012.

== Scientific activity ==
Dumitru Enescu carried out his research activity in the field of geophysics, especially seismology. Among his important scientific contributions, one can mention: (1) research on the mechanism of earthquakes in Vrancea and the entire Mediterranean - Alpine area, as well as theoretical contributions on the physics of the earthquake source, (2) the development of two methods for estimating the energy emitted by earthquakes in the form of seismic waves, (3) elaboration of the first probabilistic model of occurrence of Vrancea earthquakes and contributions regarding the hazard and seismic risk of the Romanian territory, (4) contributions regarding the crust and lithosphere structure in Romania, (5) the study of the influence of the Vrancea seismic activity at the location of the Cernavoda nuclear power plant and (6) the elaboration of an original method for determining the seismic effect of controlled industrial explosions on constructions.

The results of his scientific activity can be found in over 180 papers published in specialized national and international journals, as well as in five synthesis volumes, including: "Geophysical Prospecting" (in collaboration; "Editura Tehnica" Publishing House, 1965) and "The Earthquake in Romania on March 4, 1977" (in collaboration; "The Romanian Academy" Publishing House, 1982).

In recognition of his contributions, Dumitru Enescu received the awards of the Romanian Academy, "Grigore Cobălcescu", in 1972, and "Aurel Vlaicu", in 1983, the award of the Society of Exploration Geophysicists (SEG), for outstanding contributions to geophysical research, and the diploma of excellence awarded by the National Agency for Science, Technology and Innovation, in 2000. He was also awarded by the President of Romania with the National Order "For Merit", in the rank of "Cavalier", in 2000.

Dumitru Enescu was a member of the European Seismological Commission, the Governing Council of the International Seismological Centre, in Great Britain, and the National Committee of Geodesy and Geophysics of Romania.

== Scientific articles (selection) ==
1. Enescu D., Marmureanu A., Enescu B.D., A procedure for determining the seismic hazard generated by Vrancea earthquakes. II Attenuation Curves. Romanian Reports in Physics, 56, 147-159, 2004.
2. Enescu, B.D., Enescu, D., Constantin A.P., The use of electromagnetic data for short-term prediction of Vrancea (Romania) earthquakes. Earth, Planets and Space, 51, 1, 1099-1117, doi:10.1186/BF03351584, 1999.
3. Enescu, D., Enescu, B.D., Possible cause-effect relationships between Vrancea earthquakes and some global geophysical phenomena. Natural Hazards, 19, 233-245, doi:10.1023/A:1008095708316, 1999.
4. Wenzel, F., Achauer, U., Enescu, D., Kissling, E., Russo, R., Mocanu, V., Musacchio, G., Detailed and final stage of plate break-off is target of study in Romania. EOS, Transactions American Geophysical Union, 79, 48, 585-594, doi:10.1029/98EO00427, 1998.
5. Enescu, D., Popescu, E., Radulian M., Source characteristics of the Sinaia (Romania) sequence of May-June, 1993. Tectonophysics, 261, 39-49, doi:10.1016/0040-1951(96)00055-8, 1996.
6. Novikova, O.V., Vorobieva, I.A., Enescu, D., Radulian, M., Panza, G.F., Prediction of the strong earthquakes in Vrancea, Romania, using the CN Algorithm. Pure and Applied Geophysics (PAGEOPH), 145, 278-296, doi:10.1007/BF00880271, 1995.
7. Enescu, D., Contributions to the knowledge of the Vrancea seismic activity influence in the Cernavoda (Romania) site area. Proceedings of the XXIV-th General Assembly of the ESC, 1771-1780, Athens, 1994.
8. Fuchs, K., Bonjer, K.P., Bock, G., Cornea, I., Radu, C., Enescu, D., et al. The Romanian Earthquake of March 4, 1977. Aftershocks and migration of seismic activity. Tectonophyiscs, 53, 225-247, doi:10.1016/0040-1951(79)90068-4, 1979.
9. Enescu, D., Georgescu, A., Contributions to the spectral theory of seismic sources and determination of the parameters of earthquake foci. Pure and Applied Geophysics, 114, 71-710, doi:10.1007/BF00875662, 1976.
10. Enescu, D., Marza, V., Zamarca, I., Contributions to the statistical prediction of Vrancea earthquakes, Revue Roumaine de Geophysique, 18, 67-79, 1974.
11. Enescu, D., Georgescu, A., Zamarca, I., Theoretical model for the process of underground explosions. Contributions to the problem of the separation of large explosions from earthquakes, Bulletin of the Seismological Society of America, 63, 3, 765-785, doi:10.1785/BSSA0630030765, 1973.
12. Enescu, D., Georgescu, A., Marza, V., Simulations of the underground explosions generating longitudinal and transverse waves. Bulletin of the Seismological Society of America, 63, 3, 753-763, doi:10.1785/BSSA0630030753, 1973.
13. Enescu, D., Candea, A.I., Modèles analogiques électroniques du processus d'explosion dans les roches (in French). Geophysical Prospecting, 19, 3, 501-518, doi:10.1111/j.1365-2478.1971.tb00613.x, 1971.
14. Enescu D., Contributions to the methodology for determining the seismic effect of explosions on constructions (in Romanian). Studii si cercetari de Geofizica, 5, 1, 71-77, 1967.
15. Constantinescu, L., Ruprechtova, Enescu, D., Mediterranean-Alpine earthquake mechanisms and their seismotectonic implications. Geophysical Journal of Royal Astronomical Society, 10, 347-368, doi:10.1111/j.1365-246X.1966.tb03063.x, 1966.
16. Constantinescu, L., Enescu, D., Fault plane solutions for some Romanian earthquakes and their seismotectonic implications. Journal of Geophysical Research, 69, 667-674, doi:10.1029/JZ069i004p00667, 1964.
17. Enescu, D., On the determination of the seismic energy radiated by earthquake foci (in Russian). Izvestia Akad. Nauk, SSSR, ser. Fizica Zemli, 10, 1472-1475, 1961.
