= Cornelia Catangă =

Romanian singer (1958–2021)

- Born: March 9, 1958; Zeletin, Cătina, Buzău County, Romania
- Died: March 26, 2021 (aged 63) Bucharest, Romania
- Genres: Lăutărească music
- Instrument: vocals

Cornelia Catangă (9 March 1958 – 26 March 2021) was a Romanian lăutar musician of Roma origin.

== Biography ==
In 1979, she sang for a short time with Romica Puceanu. In 1985 she had her first show at the Polyvalent Hall. Since 1986 she toured abroad and released her first LP in 1989, accompanied by the Ion Onoriu's orchestra. She sang together with her husband Aurel Pădureanu.

Catangă died on 26 March 2021, aged 63, from COVID-19 in Bucharest during the COVID-19 pandemic in Romania. She is buried in the city's Ghencea Cemetery.
