= Mihai Drăgănescu =

Romanian engineer

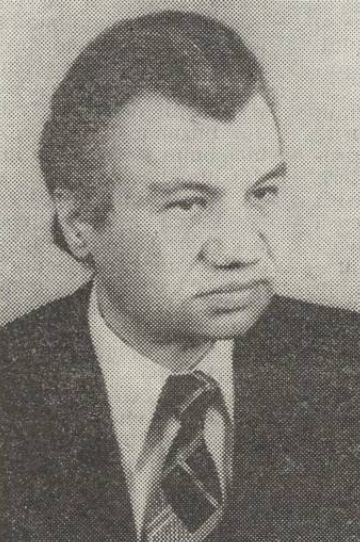
Mihai Drăgănescu, c. 1985

Mihai Corneliu Drăgănescu (October 6, 1929 – May 28, 2010) was a Romanian engineer who served as President of the Romanian Academy from 1990 to 1994.

Born in Făget, Prahova County, he received a B.Sc. in 1952 and a Ph.D. in 1957 from Politehnica University of Bucharest. He married Nora Cecilia Rebreanu in 1957. He joined the faculty of Politehnica University in 1951, becoming a professor in 1965. In 1974, he became a corresponding member of the Romanian Academy, rising to titular member in January 1990, following the Romanian Revolution. Later that year, he became the academy's president, serving until 1994 and initiating its transition into the post-communist environment. In the first cabinet of Petre Roman, in 1989–1990, he was a deputy prime minister. He co-authored several publications with Menas Kafatos, including the book Principles of Integrative Science (Editura Tehnică, 2003).

In 1971, he was made a commander of the Legion of Honour, attaining the same rank in the Order of the Star of Romania in 2000. He is buried at Bellu Cemetery.

The Research Institute for Artificial Intelligence of the Romanian Academy, set up in 1994, is named after him.
