= Constantin C. Giurescu =

Romanian historian

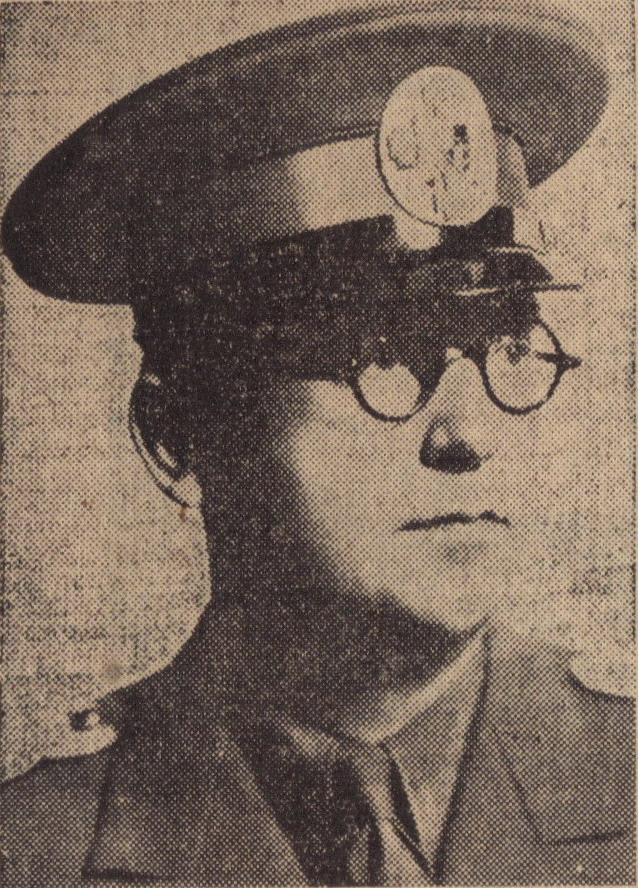
Constantin C. Giurescu in 1939

Constantin C. Giurescu (Romanian pronunciation: [konstanˈtin dʒjuˈresku]; 26 October 1901 – 13 November 1977) was a Romanian historian, member of the Romanian Academy, and professor at the University of Bucharest.

Born in Focșani, son of historian Constantin Giurescu, he completed his primary and secondary studies in Bucharest. In 1923, he graduated with a doctorate from the University of Bucharest with the thesis "Contributions to the studies of great dignitaries of the 14th and 15th century." He completed his education at the Romanian School in Paris (1923–1925) (established in 1920 by Nicolae Iorga) and upon return, he began his teaching career. He was editor (1933) of the Romanian Historical Review and founder (1931) and director (1933) of the National Institute for History.

His political activity included membership of the Chamber of Deputies of Romania (1932–1933) and secretary in the National Renaissance Front government (1939–1940).

After World War II and the advent of the Communist regime in Romania, he was fired from the University of Bucharest in 1948, and was sent as a political prisoner at the notorious Sighet Prison, where he was incarcerated from 1950 to 1955.

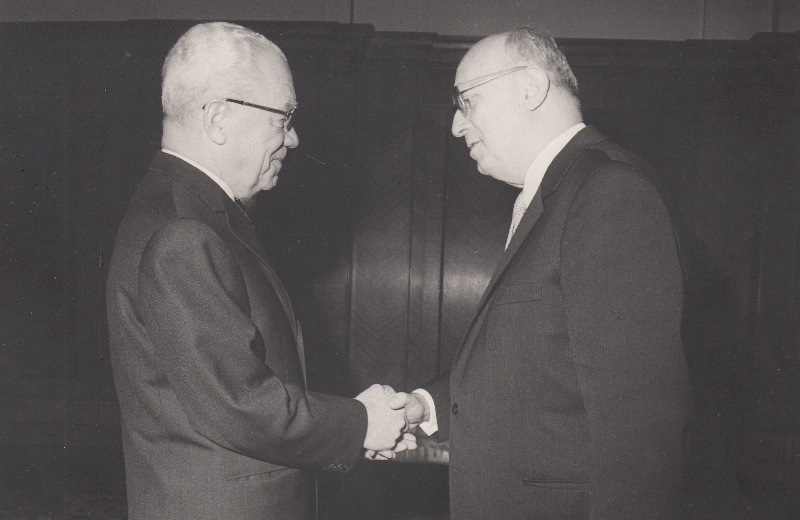
Giurescu (right) receiving an award in 1971 from Emil Bodnăraș

Giurescu returned to the University of Bucharest in 1963 and was elected titular member of the Romanian Academy in 1974. As a great specialist in medieval and early modern history of Southeast Europe, he was expected to have been the first to hold the Nicolae Iorga Chair at Columbia University in New York City in the Spring semester of 1972.

He authored works such as History of Romanians, Nomadic Populations in the Euro-Asian and the part they played in the formation of Mediaeval States, The Making of the Romanian Unitary State, The Making of the Romanian People and Language, Chronological History of Romania, Transylvania in the History of the Rumanian People, and A history of the Romanian forest.

He was the father of historian Dinu C. Giurescu.

Constantin C. Giurescu died in Bucharest in 1977, aged 76, and was buried in the city's Bellu Cemetery.
