= Dinu C. Giurescu =

Romanian historian and politician (1927–2018)

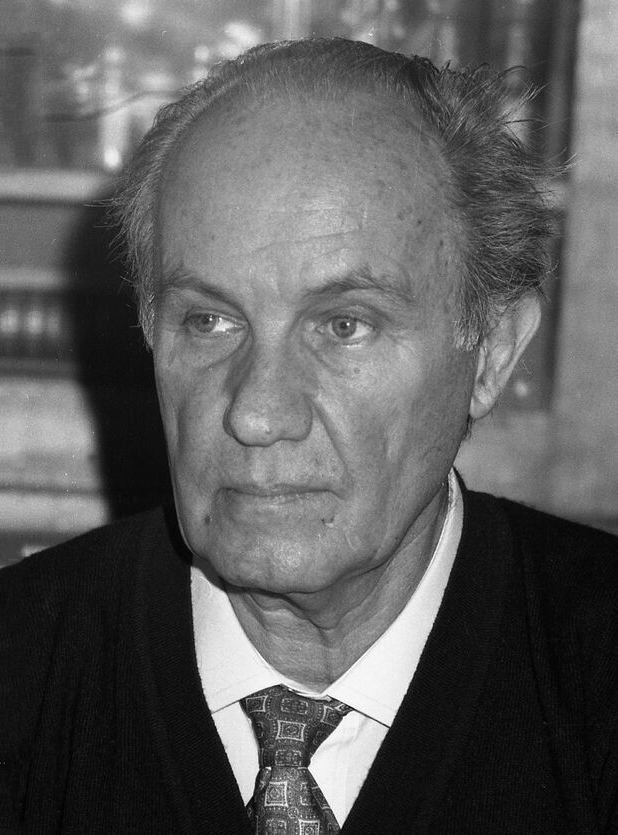
Dinu C. Giurescu

Dinu C. Giurescu (15 February 1927 – 24 April 2018) was a Romanian historian and politician.

== Biography ==
He was born in Bucharest in 1927, the son of historian Constantin C. Giurescu. After attending the Saint Sava High School, he graduated from the University of Bucharest's Faculty of History in 1950, and obtained his PhD in history from the same university in 1968. That year he became a professor at the Bucharest National University of Arts, where he taught until 1987.

Giurescu emigrated to the United States in 1988, where he published The Razing of Romania's Past, an analysis of the Nicolae Ceaușescu regime's policy toward the country's architectural heritage. For two years, he was visiting professor at William Paterson University in Wayne, New Jersey and at Texas A&M University. He returned from exile in 1990, whereupon he became a corresponding member of the Romanian Academy, and a titular member in 2001. From 1990 to 2011 he was a professor of history at the University of Bucharest. In 2012, he was elected to the Chamber of Deputies for a Bucharest seat, representing the Conservative Party. He died of myocardial infarction at his home in Bucharest in 2018 and was buried at Bellu Cemetery.

== Publications ==
- Giurescu, Dinu C. (1996). Guvernarea Nicolae Rădescu. București: Editura ALL. ISBN 9789735710354. OCLC 38097068.
- Giurescu, Dinu C. (2000). Romania in the Second World War (1939–1945). East European Monographs. Boulder, CO; New York: Columbia University Press. ISBN 9780880334433. OCLC 1170535723.
