= Constantin Giurescu (historian) =

Romanian historian (1875–1918)

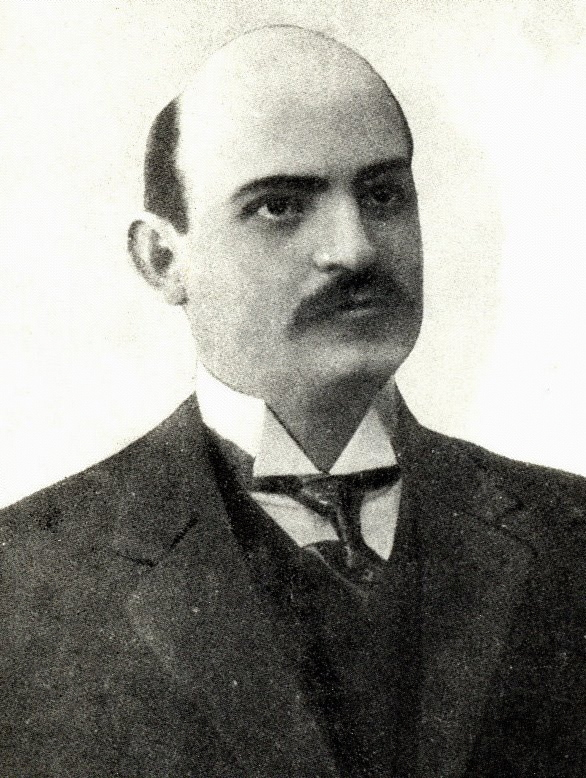
Constantin Giurescu

Constantin Giurescu (Romanian pronunciation: [konstanˈtin dʒjuˈresku]; 10 August 1875–28 October 1918) was a Romanian historian. In 1914, he became a titular member of the Romanian Academy.

== Biography ==
Giurescu was born in Chiojdu, Buzău County and studied at the Saints Peter and Paul High School in Ploiești. He graduated in July 1898 from the University of Bucharest with a diploma in Philosophy and Letters. He taught history at the Unirea High School in Focșani from 1898 to 1902. In 1900 he met Elena Antonescu (b. 1880), the daughter of Costache Antonescu, a local merchant, and married her in January 1901. In October of that year they had a son, Constantin C. Giurescu, who went on to become a noted historian.

In 1902–1903 Giurescu was the principal at the Hasdeu High School in Buzău. After a stay in Vienna, he settled in Bucharest, where he taught at the Cantemir Vodă High School, starting in 1906. In 1909 he joined the faculty at the University of Bucharest. That year he was elected corresponding member of the Romanian Academy, and în 1912 he became titular member of the academy.

He died in Bucharest as a result of the 1918 flu pandemic.

There is a bust of Giurescu in Odobești; a school in Chiojdu is named after him.

== Works ==
- Constantin Giurescu; Neculaĭ Costin; Istratie Dabija; Antiokh Dmitrievich Kantemir (1913). Letopisețul țării Moldovei de la Istratie Dabija până la domnia a doua a lui Antioh Cantemir, 1661–1705. Bucharest. OCLC 606329875.
