= Posești =

- Commune
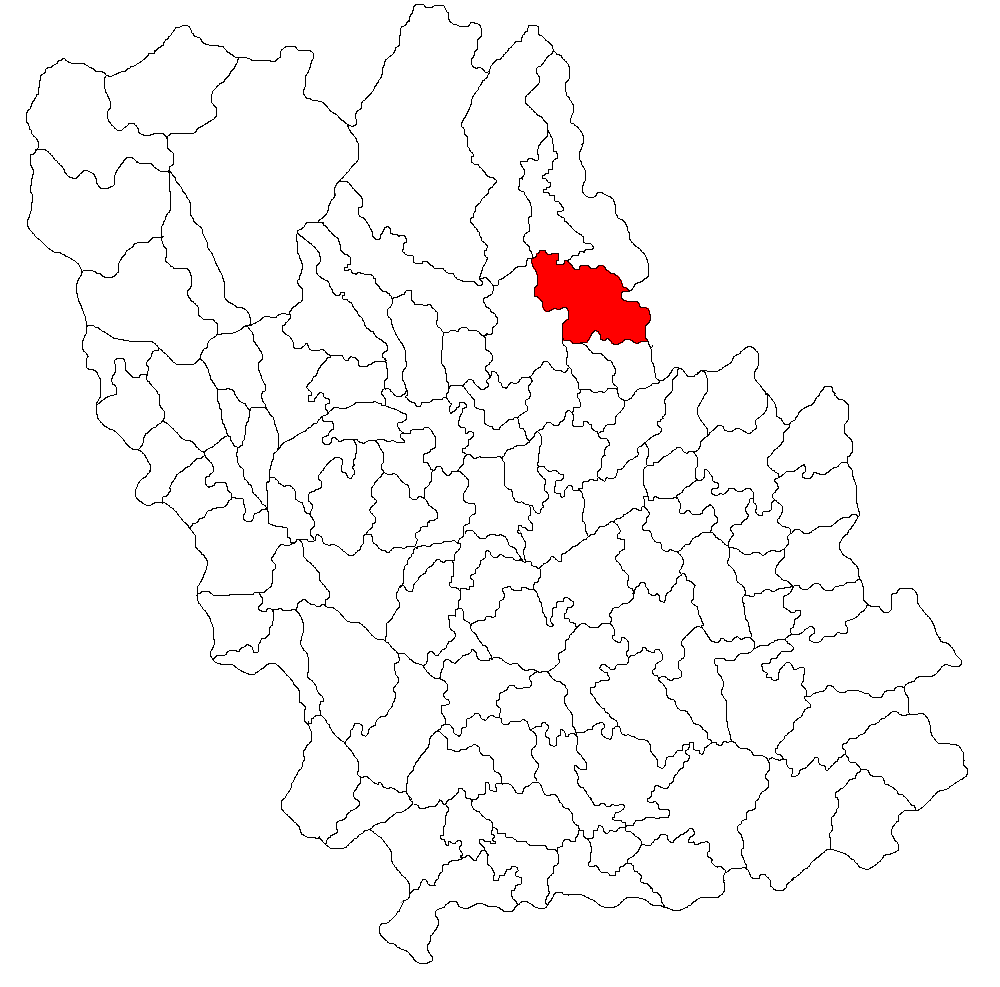
- Location in Prahova County

- Location in Romania
- Coordinates: 45.2704°N 26.1479°E
- Country: Romania
- County: Prahova

Government
  - Mayor: Valentin-Gheorghe Spătărelu (PSD)
- Area: 54.90 km^{2} (21.20 sq mi)
- Elevation: 492 m (1,614 ft)
- Population (2021-12-01): 3,636
  - Density: 66/km^{2} (170/sq mi)
- Time zone: EET/EEST (UTC+2/+3)
- Postal code: 107440
- Area code: +(40) 244
- Vehicle reg.: PH
- Website: www.primariaposesti.ro

Posești is a commune in Prahova County, Muntenia, Romania. It is composed of ten villages: Bodești, Merdeala, Nucșoara de Jos, Nucșoara de Sus, Poseștii-Pământeni (the commune centre), Poseștii-Ungureni, Târlești, Valea Plopului, Valea Screzii, and Valea Stupinii.

The commune is located in the northeastern part of the county, in the Sub Carpathian hills, on the border with Buzău County. It lies 16 km (9.9 mi) from Vălenii de Munte and 45 km (28 mi) from the county seat, Ploiești. Posești covers an area of 54.90 km^{2} (21.20 sq mi). The river Zeletin flows through the village Poseștii-Pământeni.

Historical population
Year	Pop.	±%
1992	4,612	—
2002	4,280	−7.2%
2011	3,990	−6.8%
2021	3,636	−8.9%
Source: Census data

According to the 2011 census, Posești had 3,990 inhabitants; 95.54% of them were ethnic Romanians and 1.36% Roma. At the 2021 census, the commune had a population of 3,636; of those, 92.82% were Romanians and 1.24% Roma.

== Natives ==
- Eufrosin Poteca (1786–1858), philosopher, theologian, and translator, was born in Nucșoara de Sus
