= Zeletin (Bâsca Chiojdului) =

- Location within Romania

Location
- Country: Romania
- Counties: Prahova, Buzău
- Villages: Poseștii-Pământeni, Bodești, Târlești, Zeletin

Physical characteristics
- Mouth: Bâsca Chiojdului
  - coordinates: 45.2632°N 26.2596°E
- Length: 19 km (12 mi)
- Basin size: 40 km^{2} (15 sq mi)

Basin features
- Progression: Bâsca Chiojdului→ Buzău→ Siret→ Danube→ Black Sea

The Zeletin is a right tributary of the river Bâsca Chiojdului in Romania. It discharges into the Bâsca Chiojdului near the village Zeletin. Its length is 19 km (12 mi) and its basin size is 40 km^{2} (15 sq mi).
