= Calvini =

- Commune
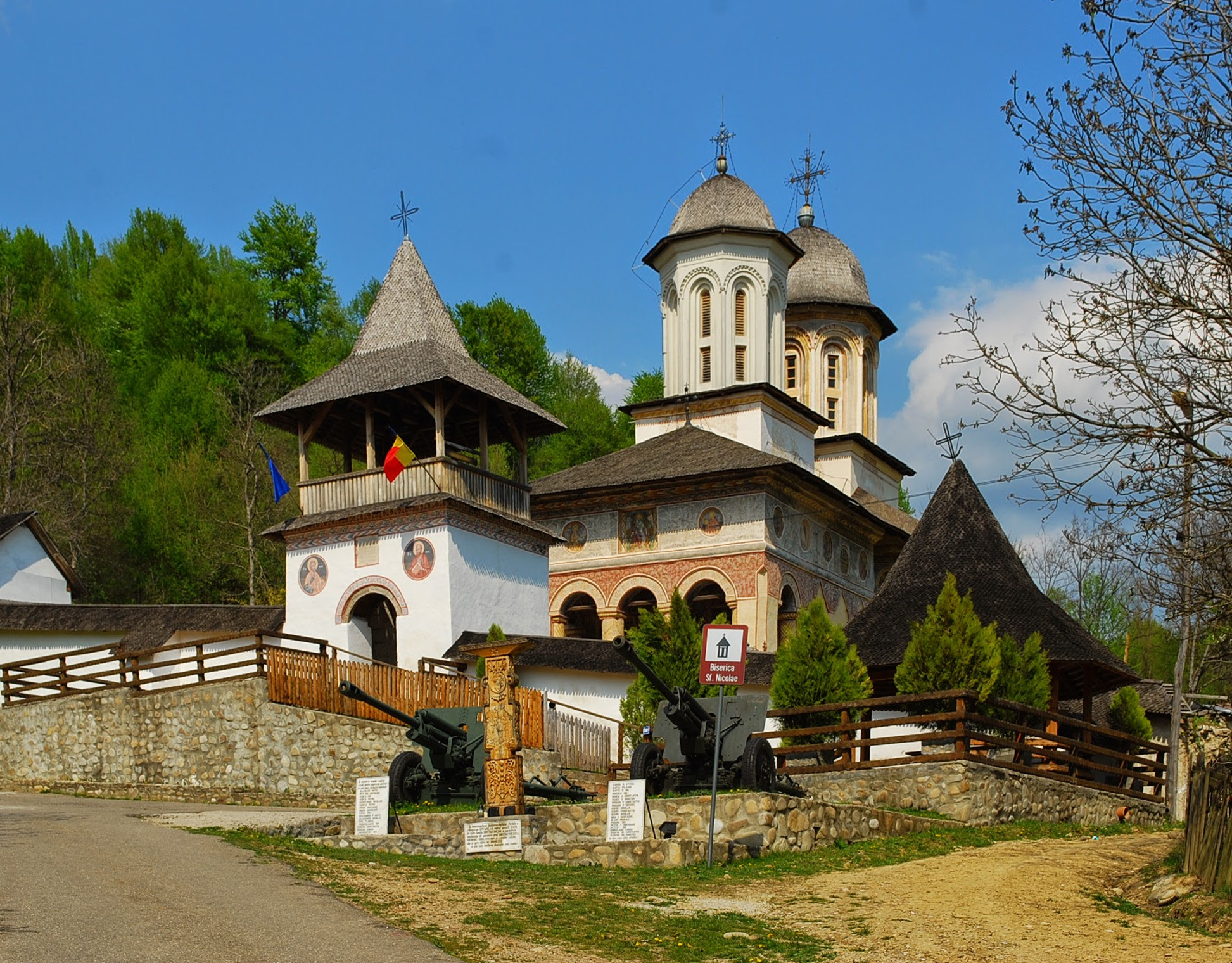
- St. Nicholas Church in Bâscenii de Jos

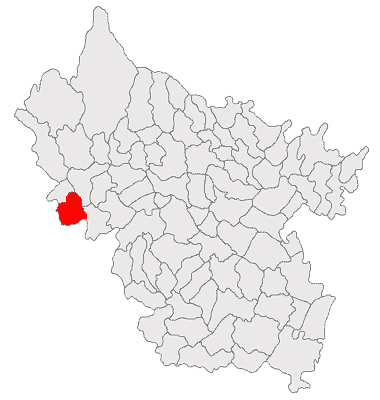
- Location in Buzău County

- Location in Romania
- Coordinates: 45°14′45″N 26°18′0″E
- Country: Romania
- County: Buzău
- Subdivisions: Bâscenii de Jos, Bâscenii de Sus, Calvini, Frăsinet, Olari

Government
  - Mayor (2020–2024): Valeriu Bîtu (PNL)
- Area: 59.19 km^{2} (22.85 sq mi)
- Elevation: 314 m (1,030 ft)
- Population (2021-12-01): 4,424
  - Density: 74.74/km^{2} (193.6/sq mi)
- Time zone: UTC+02:00 (EET)
  - Summer (DST): UTC+03:00 (EEST)
- Postal code: 127130
- Area code: +40 238
- Vehicle reg.: BZ
- Website: www.primariacalvini.ro

Calvini is a commune in Buzău County, Muntenia, Romania. It is composed of five villages: Bâscenii de Jos, Bâscenii de Sus, Calvini, Frăsinet, and Olari.

Historical population
Year	Pop.	±%
2002	4,371	—
2011	4,536	+3.8%
2021	4,424	−2.5%
Source: Census data
