= Drajna =

- Commune
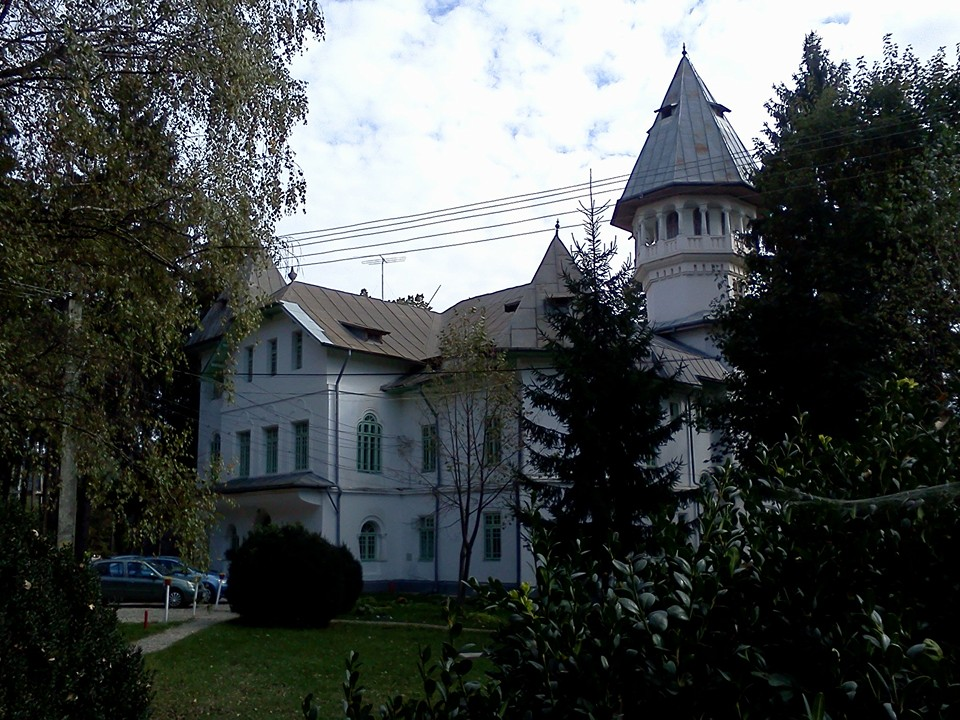
- The Pneumophthisiology Hospital in Drajna de Jos (previously, the Filipescu Drăjneanu mansion)

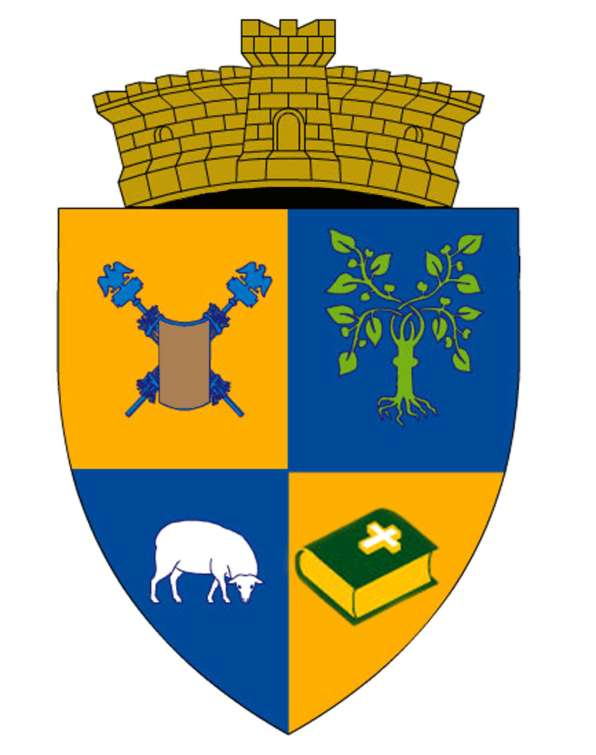
- Coat of arms

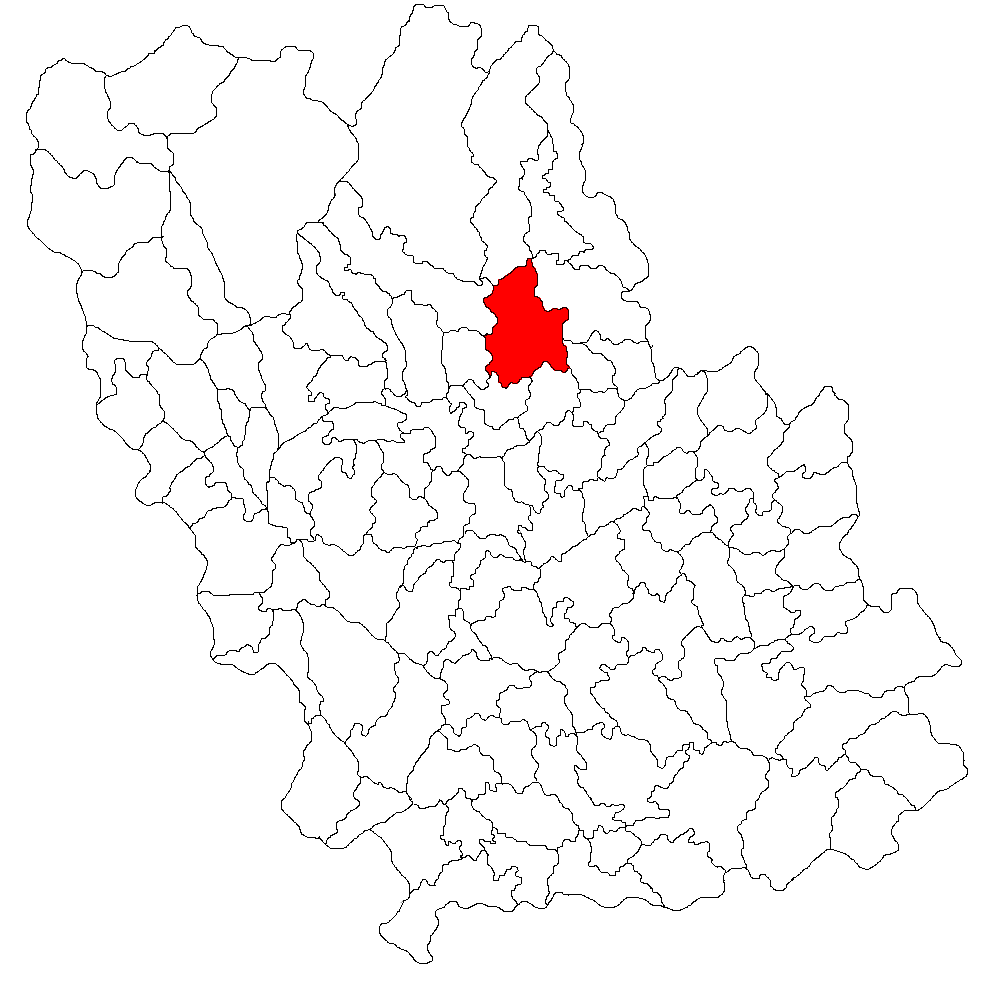
- Location in Prahova County

- Location in Romania
- Coordinates: 45°13′N 26°03′E
- Country: Romania
- County: Prahova

Government
  - Mayor (2024–2028): Violeta Gonțea (PNL)
- Area: 54.17 km^{2} (20.92 sq mi)
- Elevation: 419 m (1,375 ft)
- Population (2021-12-01): 5,102
  - Density: 94.18/km^{2} (243.9/sq mi)
- Time zone: UTC+02:00 (EET)
  - Summer (DST): UTC+03:00 (EEST)
- Postal code: 107190
- Area code: +(40) 244
- Vehicle reg.: PH
- Website: www.primaria-drajna.ro

Drajna is a commune in Prahova County, Muntenia, Romania. It is composed of eleven villages: Cătunu, Ciocrac, Drajna de Jos, Drajna de Sus (the commune centre), Făget, Ogretin, Piatra, Pițigoi, Plai, Podurile, and Poiana Mierlei.

The river Drajna flows through the commune; it discharges into the Teleajen in Piatra.

In the hamlet of Făget there was once a Transport Museum, installed in the Hanul Roșu [Red Inn], a former stop on the Transylvania-Wallachia trade route. The museum closed in 1980, and the inn was destroyed by a fire in 1998.

Historical population
Year	Pop.	±%
2002	5,761	—
2011	5,168	−10.3%
2021	5,102	−1.3%
Source: Census data

== Natives ==
- Mihai Drăgănescu (1929–2010), engineer, President of the Romanian Academy (1990–1994)
- Dumitru Enescu (1930–2012), geophysicist and engineer
