= Ariceștii Zeletin =

- Commune
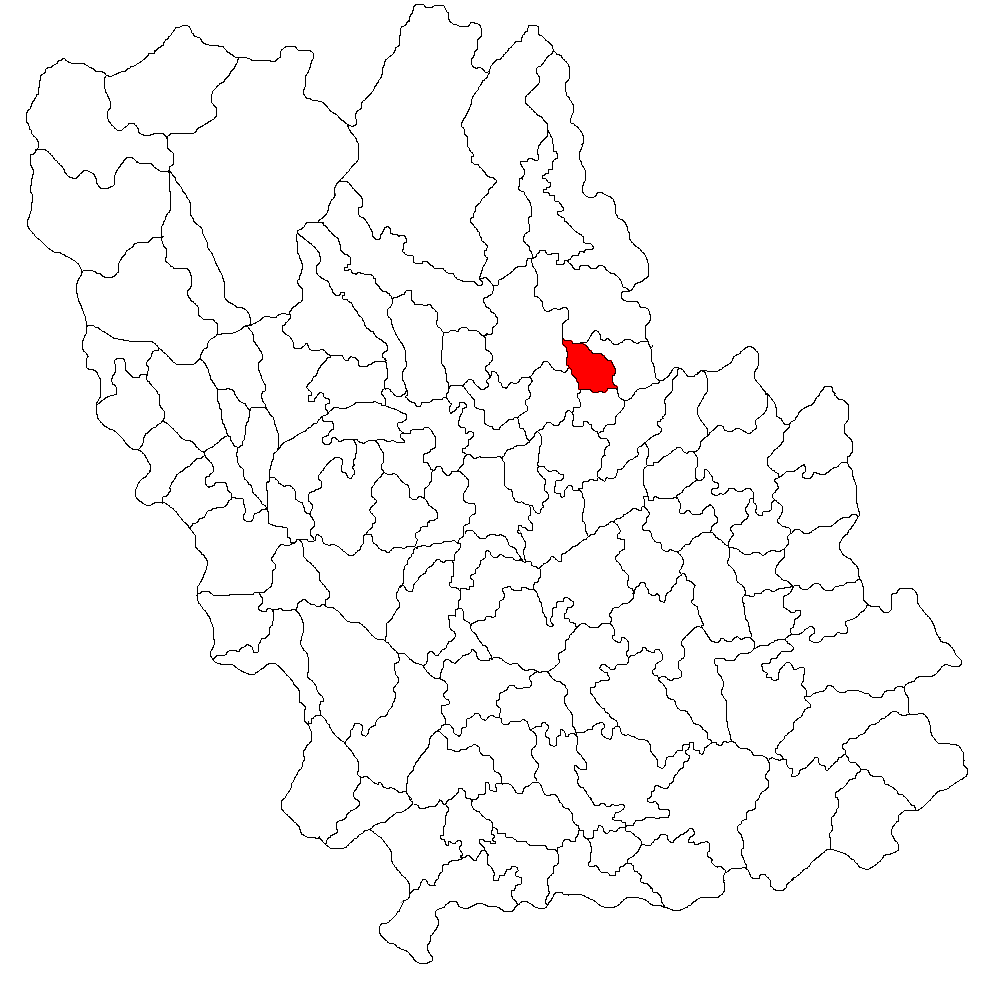
- Location in Prahova County

- Location in Romania
- Coordinates: 45°13′N 26°10′E
- Country: Romania
- County: Prahova

Government
  - Mayor (2020–2024): Florin-Daniel Roșu (PNL)
- Area: 20.86 km^{2} (8.05 sq mi)
- Elevation: 343 m (1,125 ft)
- Population (2021-12-01): 1,038
  - Density: 50/km^{2} (130/sq mi)
- Time zone: EET/EEST (UTC+2/+3)
- Postal code: 107030
- Area code: +(40) 244
- Vehicle reg.: PH
- Website: www.primariaaricesti.ro

Ariceștii Zeletin is a commune in Prahova County, Muntenia, Romania. It is composed of two villages, Albinari and Ariceștii Zeletin.

Historical population
Year	Pop.	±%
1992	1,466	—
2002	1,399	−4.6%
2011	1,224	−12.5%
2021	1,038	−15.2%
Source: Census data

At the 2002 census, the commune had a population of 1,399; of those, 274 lived in Albinari and 1,125 in Ariceștii Zeletin. At the 2021 census, there were 1,038 inhabitants, of which 93.83% were Romanians.
