= Bâsca Chiojdului =

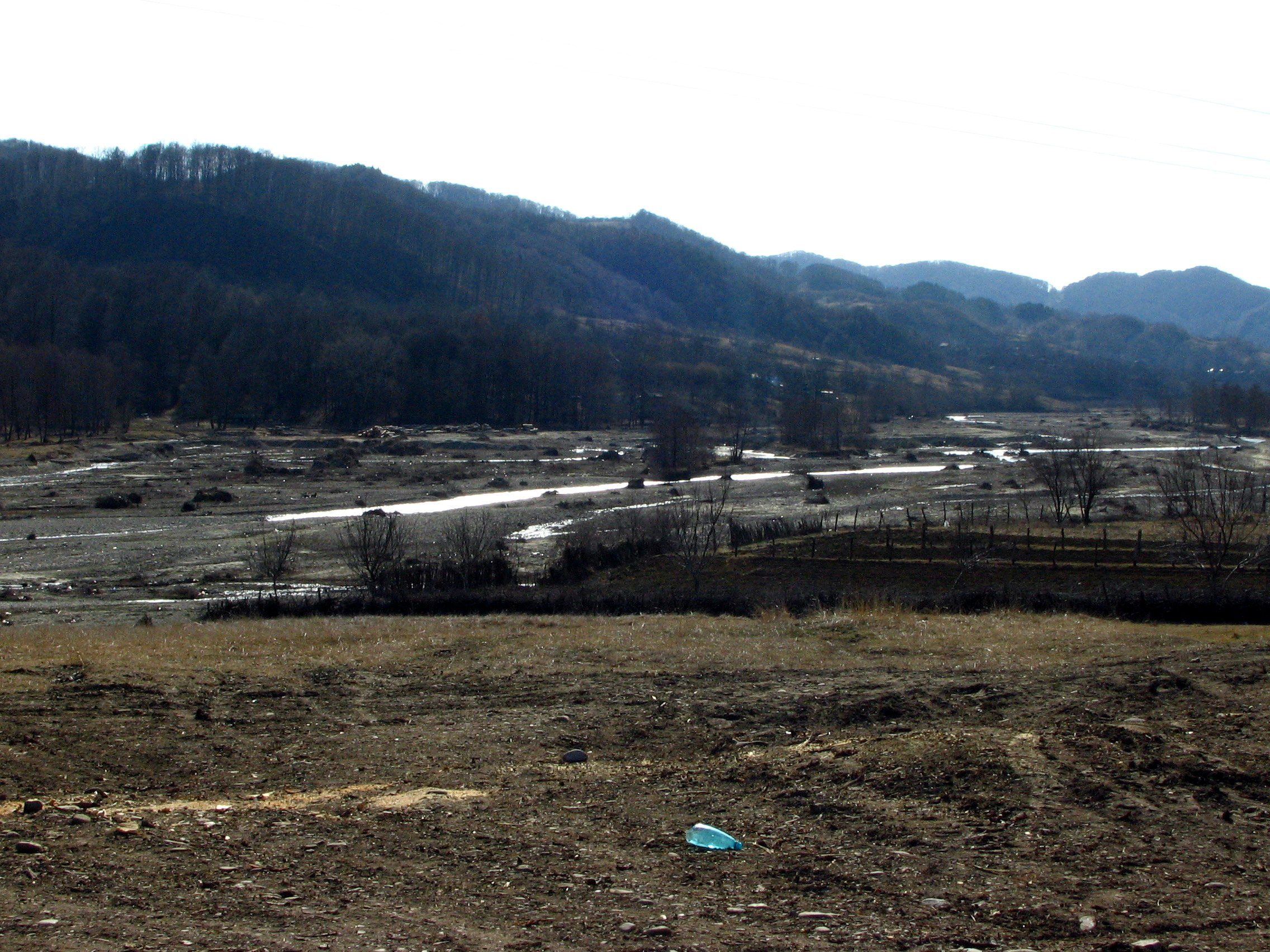
- The Bâsca Chiojdului in Cislău.

- Location within Romania

Location
- Country: Romania
- Counties: Prahova, Buzău

Physical characteristics
- Source: Mount Tătăruțu
  - location: Siriu Mountains
- Mouth: Buzău
  - location: Cislău
  - coordinates: 45.2528°N 26.3773°E
- Length: 42 km (26 mi)
- Basin size: 340 km^{2} (130 sq mi)

Basin features
- Progression: Buzău→ Siret→ Danube→ Black Sea

The Bâsca Chiojdului (Romanian pronunciation: [ˈbɨska ˈkjoʒduluj]) is a right tributary of the river Buzău in Romania. It discharges into the Buzău in Cislău. The following villages are situated along the river Bâsca Chiojdului, from source to mouth: Bâsca Chiojdului, Chiojdu, Lera, Cătina, Calvini. Its length is 42 km (26 mi) and its basin size is 340 km^{2} (130 sq mi).

== Tributaries ==
The following rivers are tributaries to the river Bâsca Chiojdului:

- Left: Preseaca, Colnic, Plescioara, Râul Păcurei, Smăciniș, Lera
- Right: Bâsca fără Cale, Manole, Căcăcei, Râul Murătoarei, Stâmnic, Zeletin, Frăsinet
