= Bătrâni =

- Commune
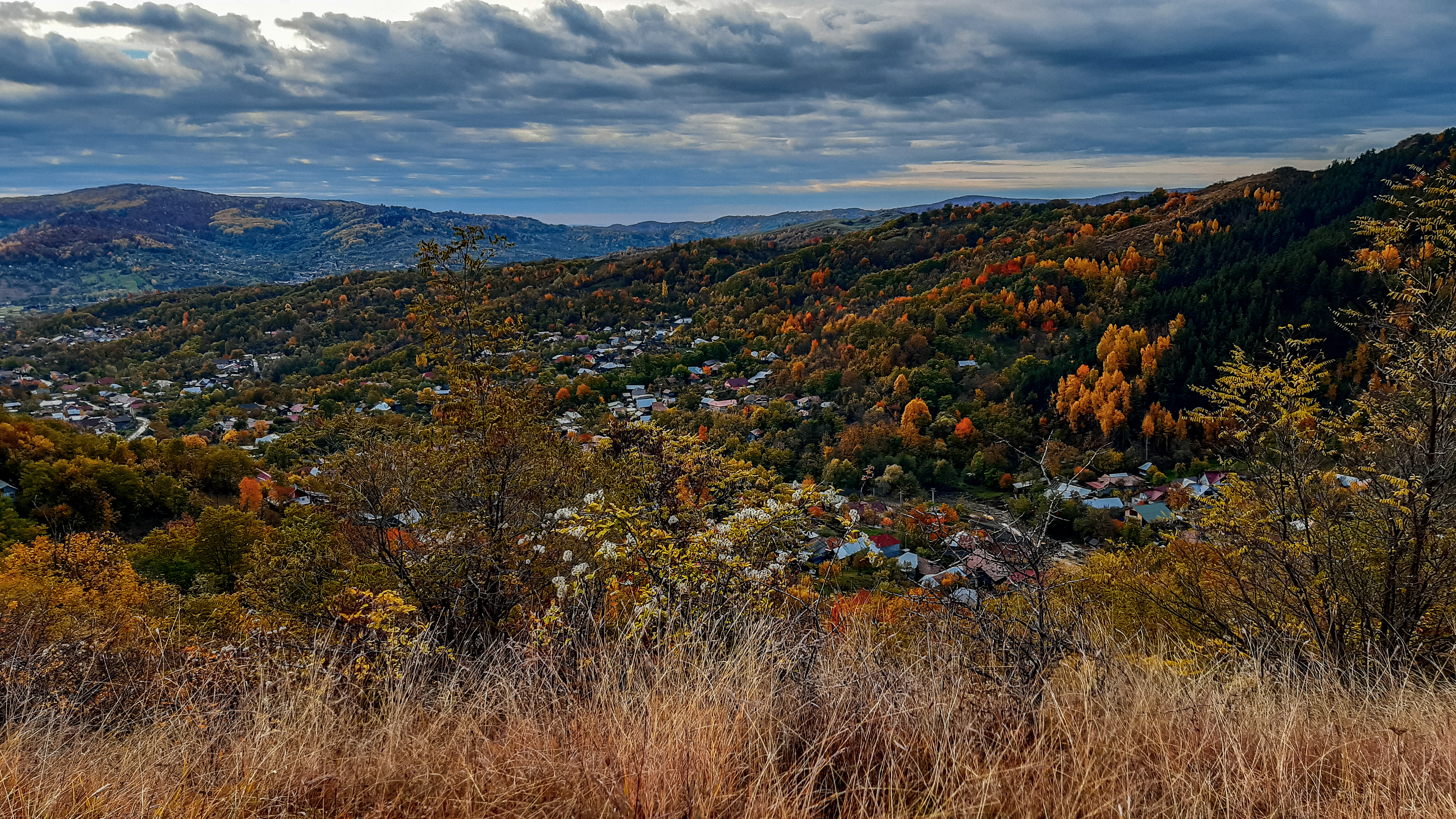
- View of Bătrâni village

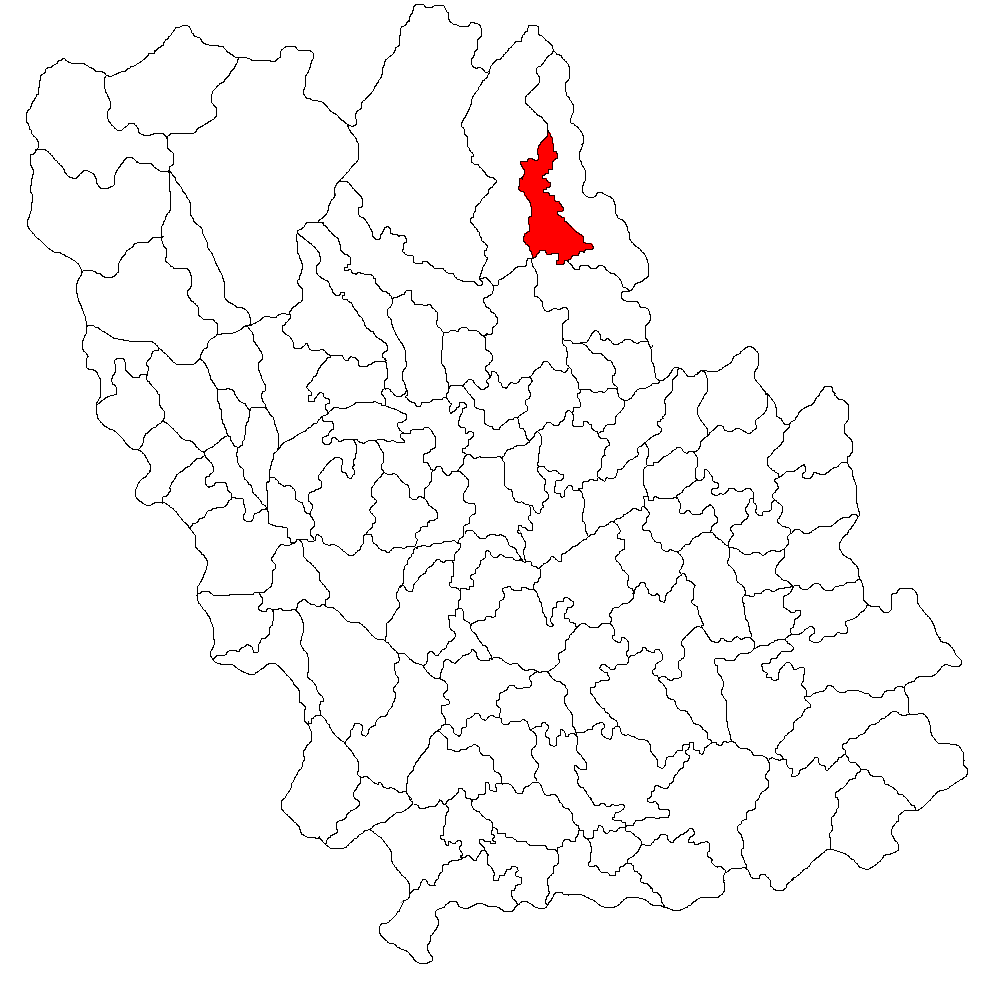
- Location in Prahova County

- Location in Romania
- Coordinates: 45.3139°N 26.1492°E
- Country: Romania
- County: Prahova

Government
  - Mayor (2020–2024): Florin-Nicolaie Stoica (PSD)
- Area: 46.33 km^{2} (17.89 sq mi)
- Elevation: 502 m (1,647 ft)
- Population (2021-12-01): 1,792
  - Density: 38.68/km^{2} (100.2/sq mi)
- Time zone: UTC+02:00 (EET)
  - Summer (DST): UTC+03:00 (EEST)
- Postal code: 107536
- Area code: +(40) 244
- Vehicle reg.: PH
- Website: primariabatrani.ro

Bătrâni is a commune in Prahova County, Muntenia, Romania. It is composed of two villages, Bătrâni and Poiana Mare.

The commune is located in the foothills of the Ciucaș Mountains, at an altitude of about 500 m (1,600 ft). It is located in the northeastern part of Prahova County, 50 km (31 mi) north of the county seat, Ploiești.

Historical population
Year	Pop.	±%
2002	2,159	—
2011	2,147	−0.6%
2021	1,792	−16.5%
Source: Census data
