= Pănătău =

- Commune
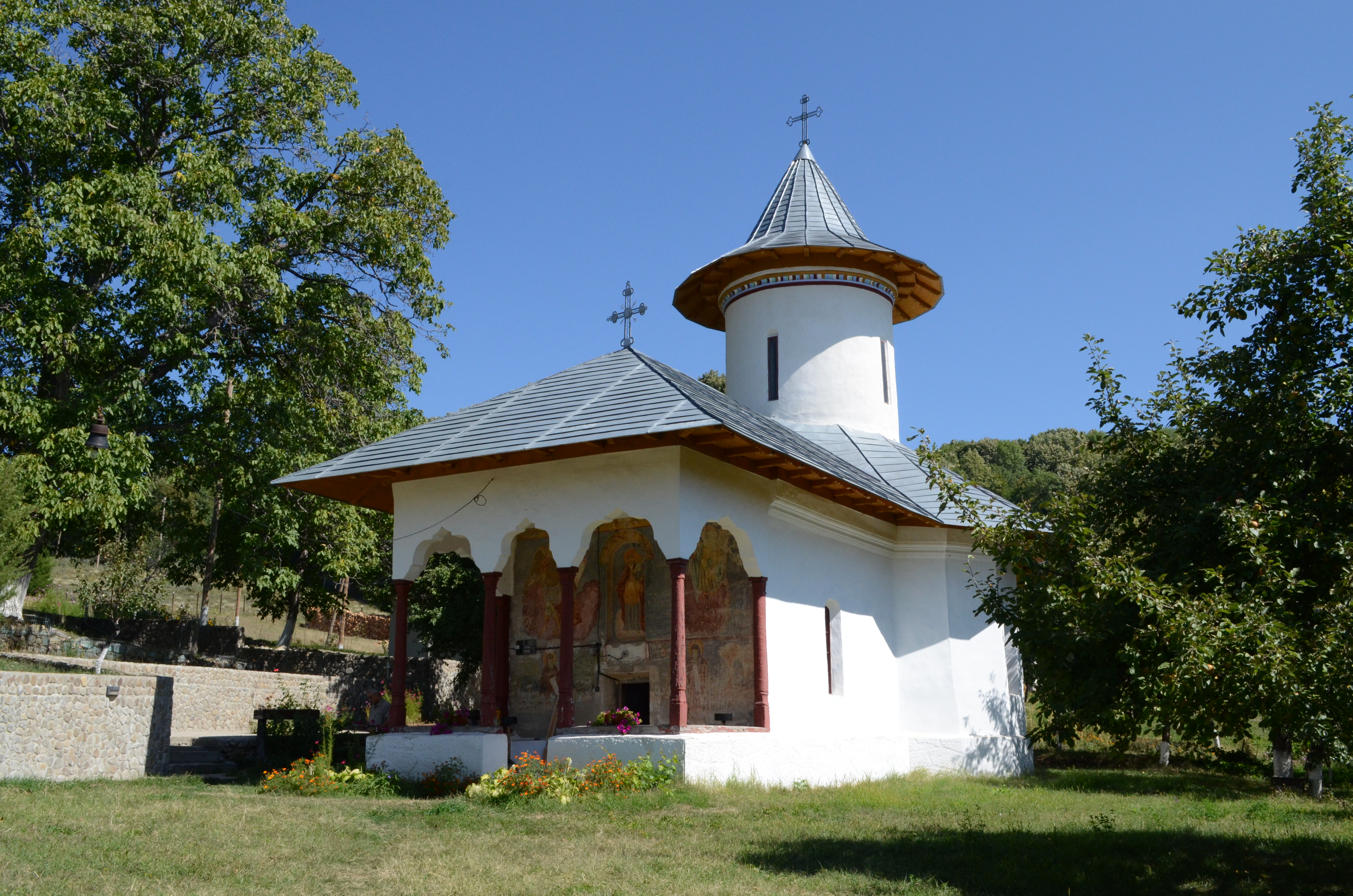
- St. Archangels Michael and Gabriel Church of the Cârnu Monastery in Tega

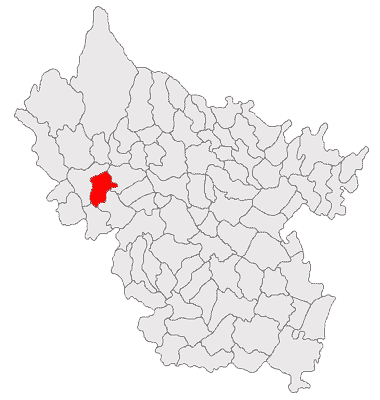
- Location in Buzău County

- Location in Romania
- Coordinates: 45°19′N 26°23′E
- Country: Romania
- County: Buzău
- Subdivisions: Becu, Lacu cu Anini, Măguricea, Plăișor, Pănătău, Râpile, Sibiciul de Jos, Tega, Zaharești

Government
  - Mayor (2020–2024): Nicolae Stoica (PSD)
- Area: 50.63 km^{2} (19.55 sq mi)
- Elevation: 413 m (1,355 ft)
- Population (2021-12-01): 2,072
  - Density: 40.92/km^{2} (106.0/sq mi)
- Time zone: UTC+02:00 (EET)
  - Summer (DST): UTC+03:00 (EEST)
- Postal code: 127420
- Area code: +(40) 238
- Vehicle reg.: BZ
- Website: panatau.ro

Pănătău is a commune in Buzău County, Muntenia, Romania. It is composed of nine villages: Begu, Lacu cu Anini, Măguricea, Pănătău, Plăișor, Râpile, Sibiciu de Jos, Tega, and Zaharești.

Historical population
| Year | Pop. | ±% |
|---|---|---|
| 2002 | 2,889 | — |
| 2011 | 2,537 | −12.2% |
| 2021 | 2,072 | −18.3% |
Source: Census data
