= Starchiojd =

- Commune
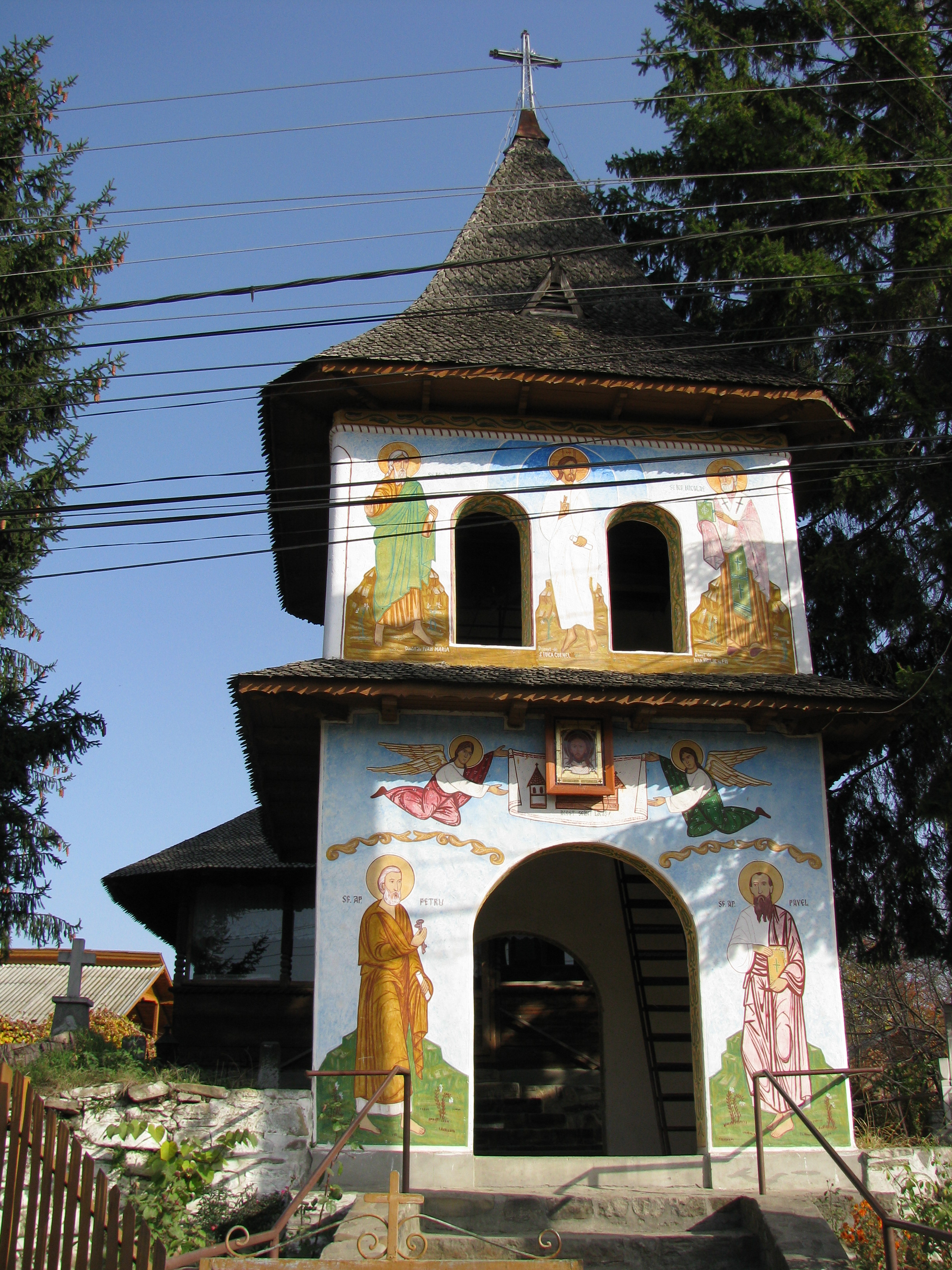
- Church in Starchiojd village

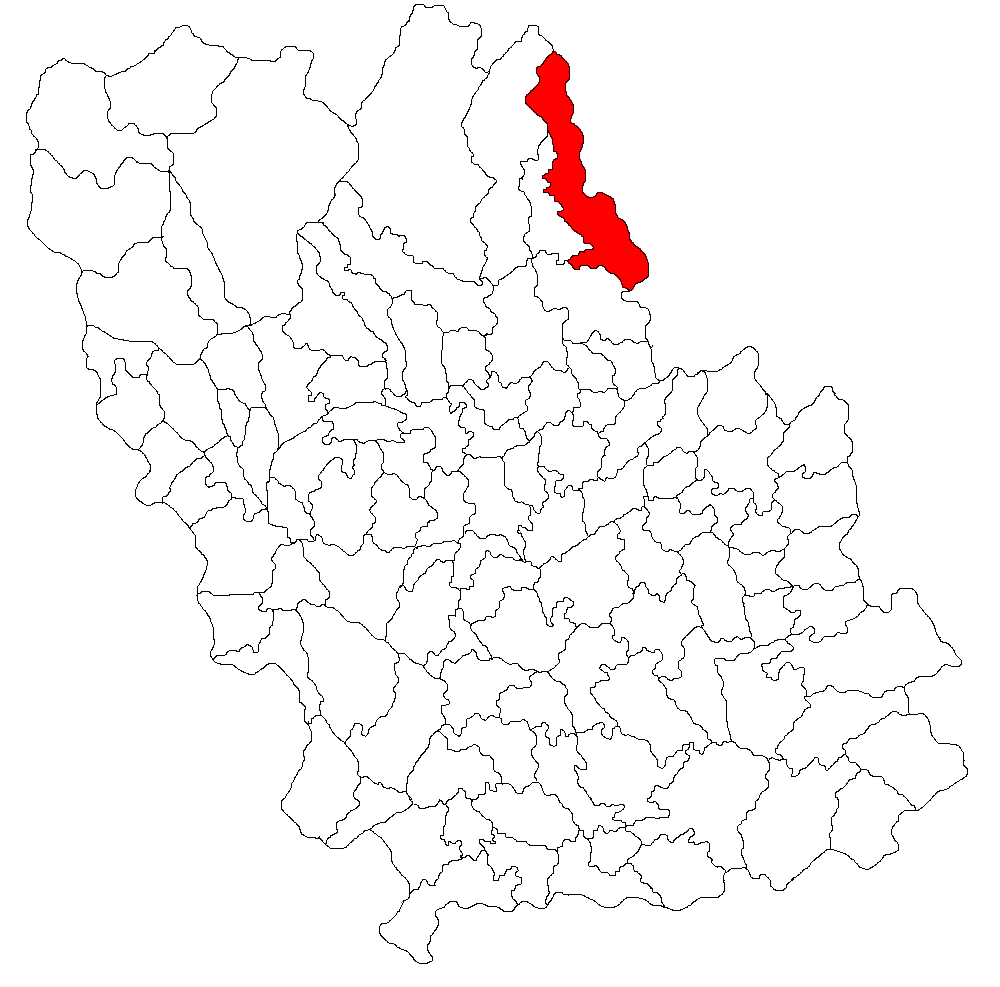
- Location in Prahova County

- Location in Romania
- Coordinates: 45°19′N 26°11′E
- Country: Romania
- County: Prahova

Government
  - Mayor (2020–2024): Ahmed-Cornel Gârbea (PRO)
- Area: 83.04 km^{2} (32.06 sq mi)
- Elevation: 441 m (1,447 ft)
- Population (2021-12-01): 3,299
  - Density: 39.73/km^{2} (102.9/sq mi)
- Time zone: UTC+02:00 (EET)
  - Summer (DST): UTC+03:00 (EEST)
- Postal code: 107535
- Vehicle reg.: PH
- Website: www.primariastarchiojd.ro

Starchiojd is a commune in Prahova County, Muntenia, Romania. It is composed of six villages: Brădet, Gresia, Rotarea, Starchiojd, Valea Anei, and Zmeuret.

The commune is situated in a hilly area, at the foot of the Curvature Carpathians. It is located in the northeastern part of the county, on the border with Buzău County.

Historical population
Year	Pop.	±%
2002	4,544	—
2011	3,770	−17.0%
2021	3,299	−12.5%
Source: Census data

== Notes ==
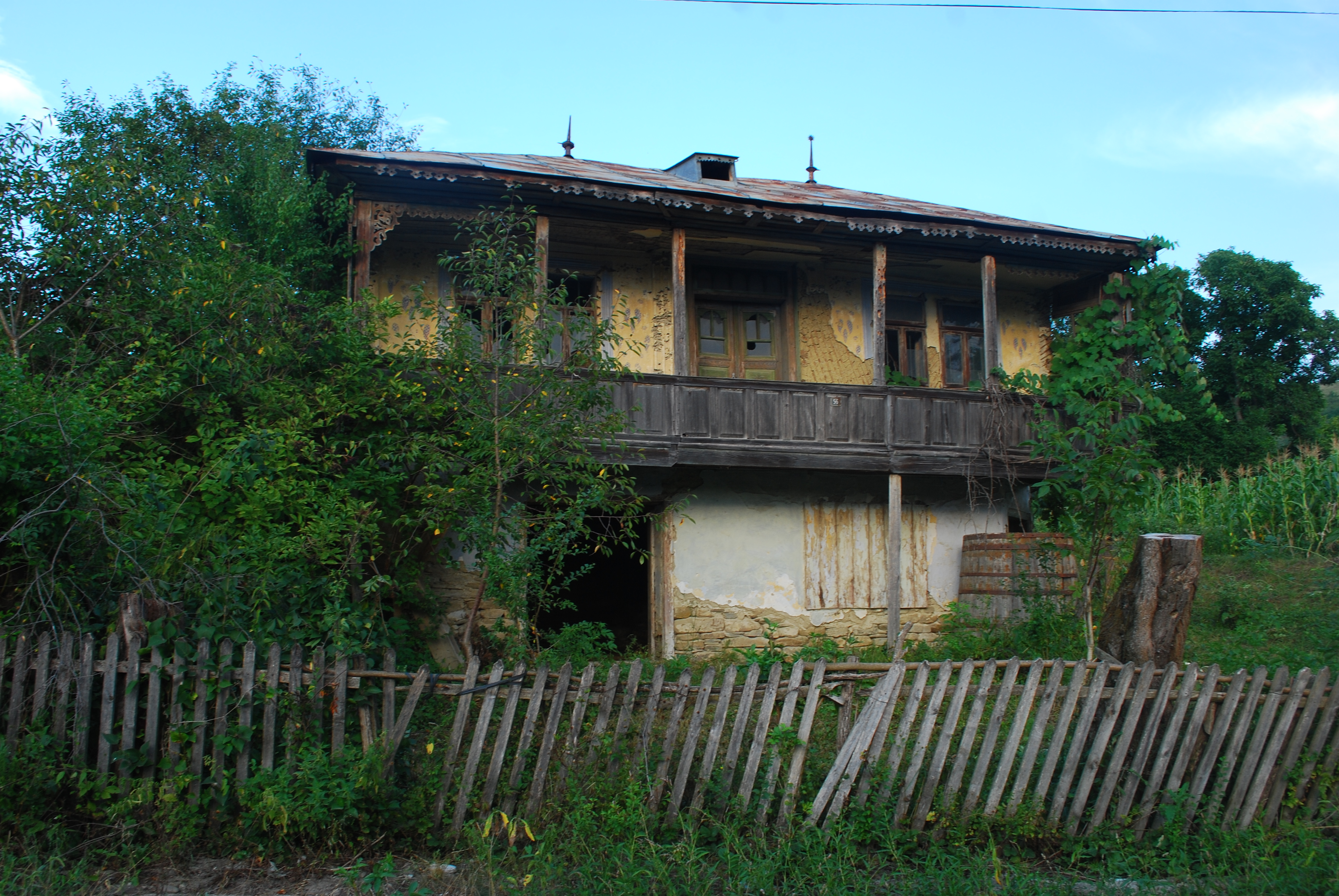
The Tache Zăhărăchescu house in Starchiojd
