= Cătina, Buzău =

Cătina
- Commune
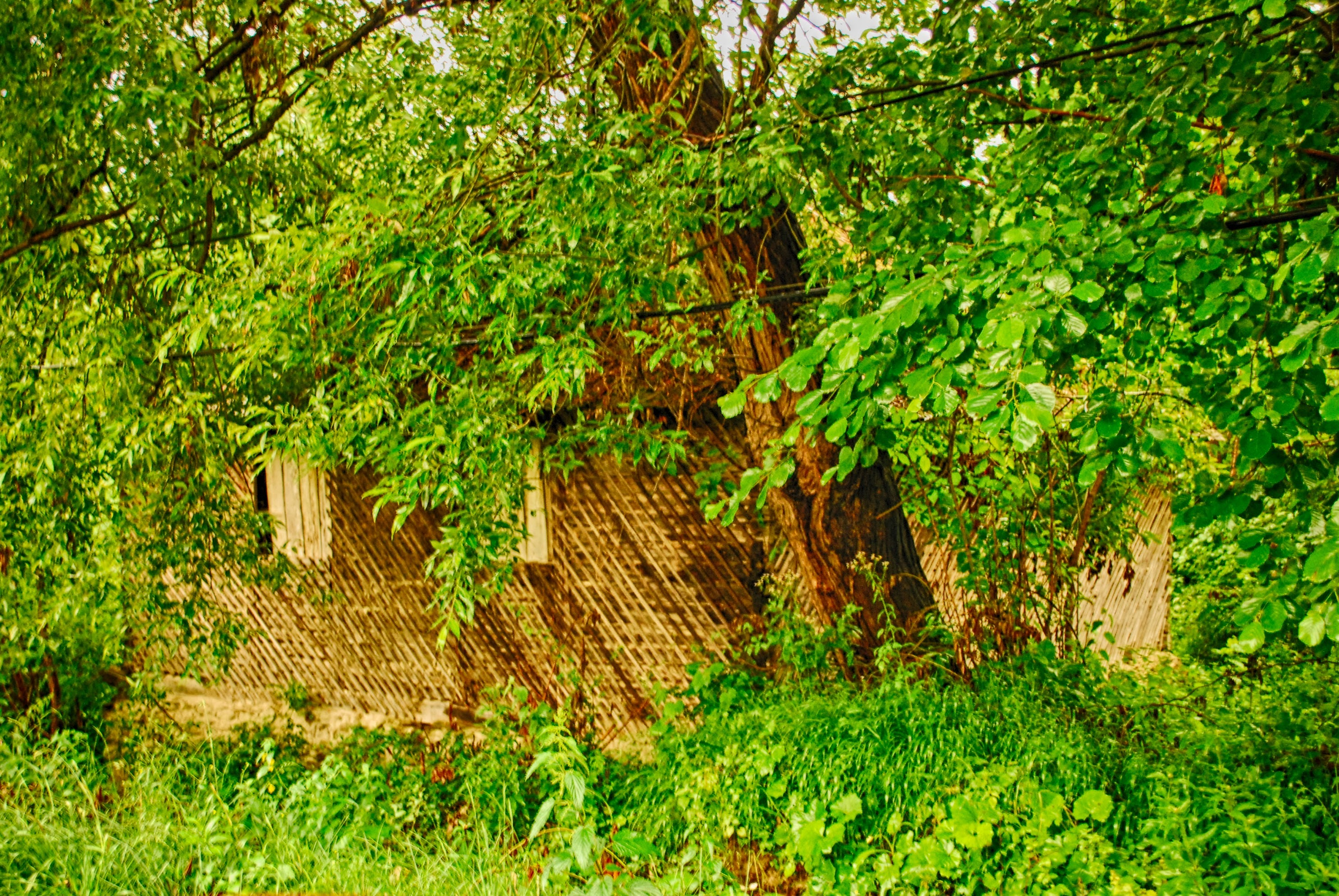
- Watermill in Cătina

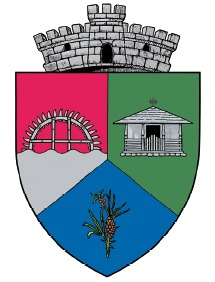
- Coat of arms

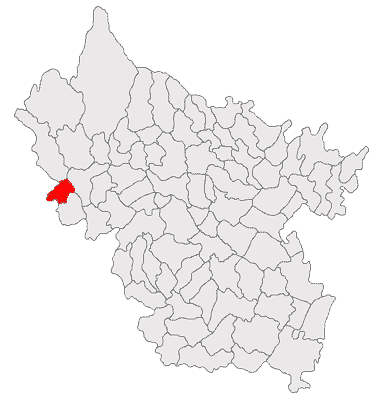
- Location in Buzău County

- Location in Romania
- Coordinates: 45°18′N 26°15′E
- Country: Romania
- County: Buzău
- Subdivisions: Cătina, Corbu, Slobozia, Valea Cătinei, Zeletin

Government
  - Mayor (2020–2024): Alexandru-Constantin Fulgeanu (PSD)
- Area: 37.96 km^{2} (14.66 sq mi)
- Elevation: 370 m (1,210 ft)
- Population (2021-12-01): 2,182
  - Density: 57.48/km^{2} (148.9/sq mi)
- Time zone: UTC+02:00 (EET)
  - Summer (DST): UTC+03:00 (EEST)
- Postal code: 127145
- Area code: +(40) 238
- Vehicle reg.: BZ
- Website: primariacatinabz.ro

Cătina is a commune in Buzău County, Muntenia, Romania. It is composed of five villages: Cătina, Corbu, Slobozia, Valea Cătinei, and Zeletin.

Historical population
Year	Pop.	±%
2002	2,710	—
2011	2,544	−6.1%
2021	2,182	−14.2%
Source: Census data

== Notable people ==
- Cornelia Catangă (born in Zeletin, 1958–2021), lăutar musician
