= Fulga =

- Commune
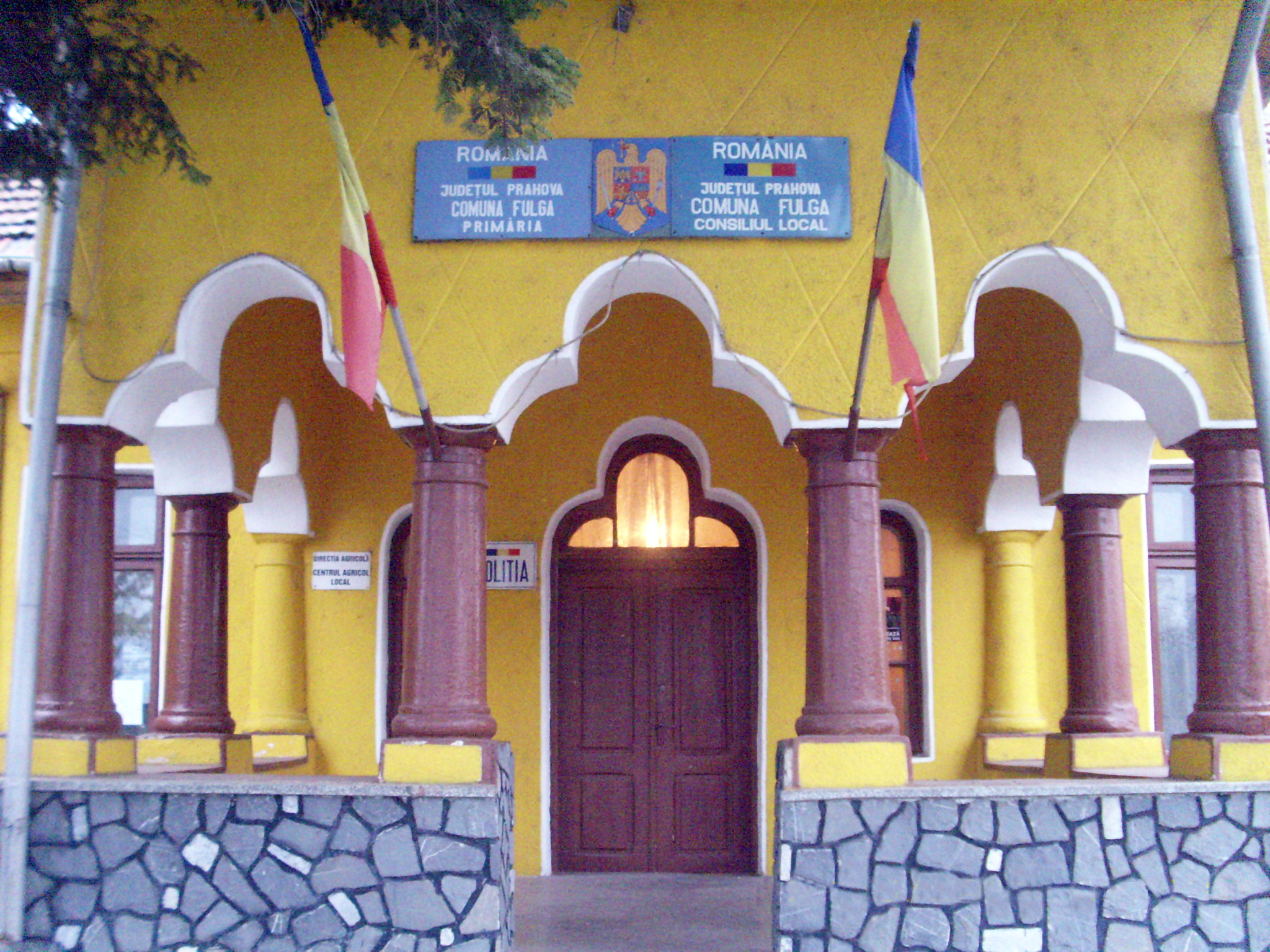
- Fulga town hall

- Coat of arms

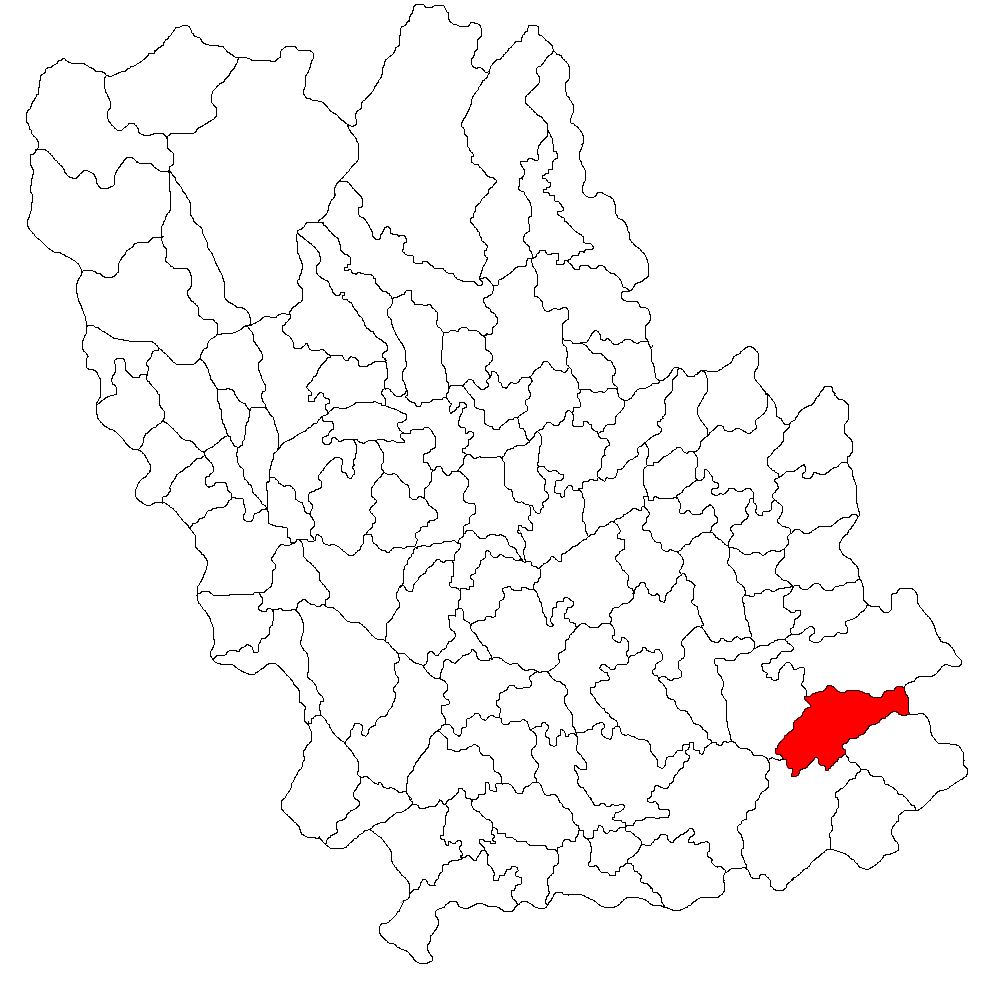
- Location in Prahova County

- Location in Romania
- Coordinates: 44°53′N 26°26′E
- Country: Romania
- County: Prahova

Government
  - Mayor (2020–2024): Constantin Badea (PSD)
- Area: 74.45 km^{2} (28.75 sq mi)
- Population (2021-12-01): 2,889
  - Density: 38.80/km^{2} (100.5/sq mi)
- Time zone: UTC+02:00 (EET)
  - Summer (DST): UTC+03:00 (EEST)
- Postal code: 107260
- Vehicle reg.: PH
- Website: primariafulga.ro

Fulga is a commune in Prahova County, Muntenia, Romania. It is composed of two villages, Fulga de Jos and Fulga de Sus; the former is the administrative centre.

== Geography ==
The commune is situated in the Wallachian Plain, more specifically, in the Gherghița Plain, north of what were once the Codrii Vlăsiei, and northwest of the Bărăgan Plain. It is located in the southeastern corner of Prahova County, on the border with Buzău County, at a distance of 14 km (8.7 mi) from the town of Mizil and 39 km (24 mi) from the county seat, Ploiești. The country's capital, Bucharest, is 65 km (40 mi) to the southwest.

The river Bălana flows through the commune, forming a lake that separates the two component villages. Wels catfish grow in the lake; they can attain 1.8 m (5 ft 11 in) in length and can weigh up to 48 kg (106 lb). The Bălana discharges into the Ghighiu at the eastern edge of Fulga.

The commune is crossed by county road DJ100C, which lead north to Baba Ana and Mizil (where it ends in national road DN1B) and south to Sălciile. Road DJ100B bifurcates from DJ100C in Fulga de Jos, leading west to Drăgănești, where it meets DN1D.

== Demographics ==
Historical population
Year	Pop.	±%
1992	4,077	—
2002	3,882	−4.8%
2011	3,482	−10.3%
2021	2,889	−17.0%
Source: Census data

At the 2011 census, Fulga had 3,482 inhabitants, of which 93.74% were Romanians and 3.62% Roma. At the 2021 census, the commune had a population of 2,889; of those, 93.49% were Romanians and 2.25% Roma.

== People ==
- Writer Laurențiu Fulga (1916–1984) was born Laurențiu Ionescu in Fulga de Jos. He took his pen name after the commune; the local school now bears his name.
- Lawyer and politician Ana Birchall was born in 1973 in nearby Mizil, but grew up in Fulga de Jos, where she attended the local school.

== Notes ==
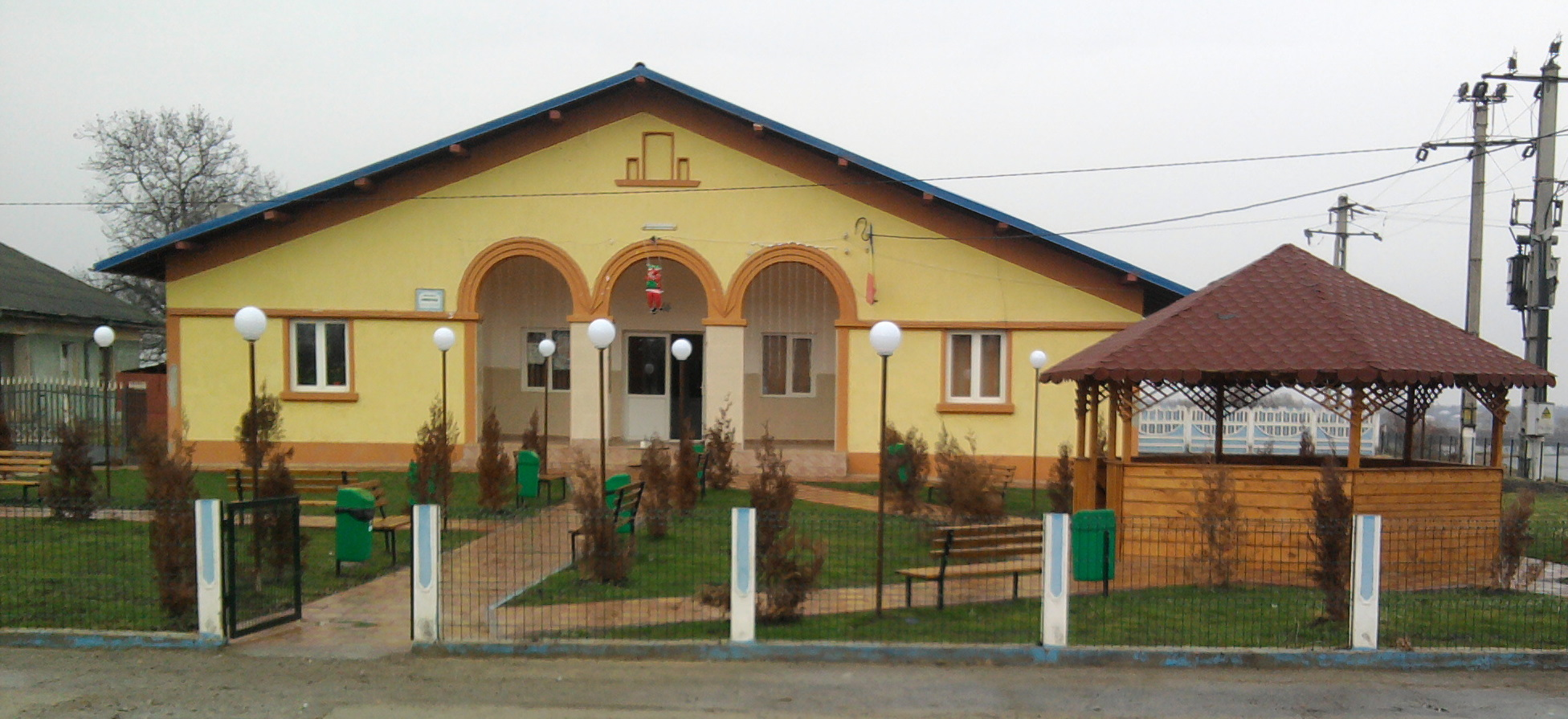
Civic hall

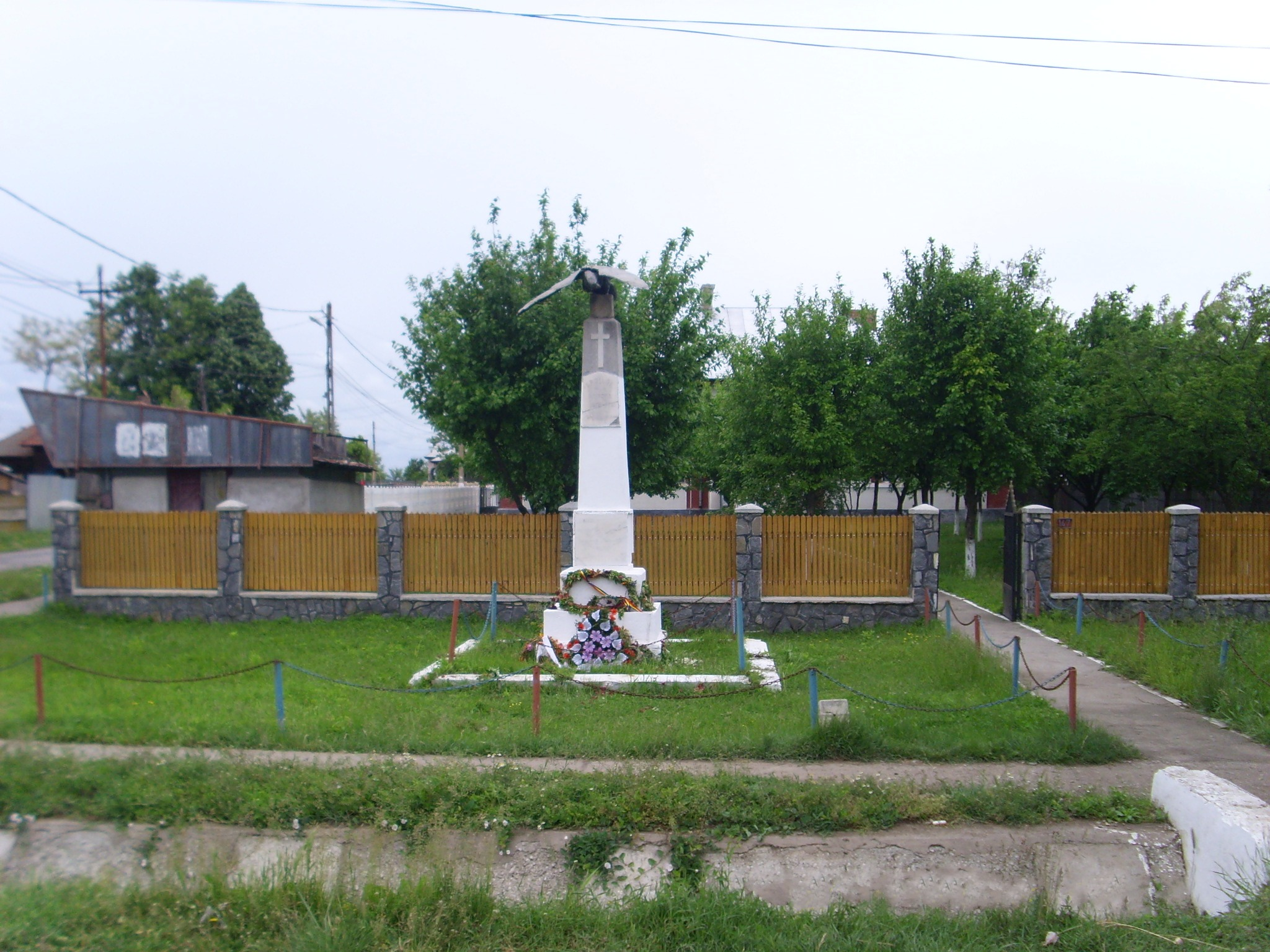
Heroes monument

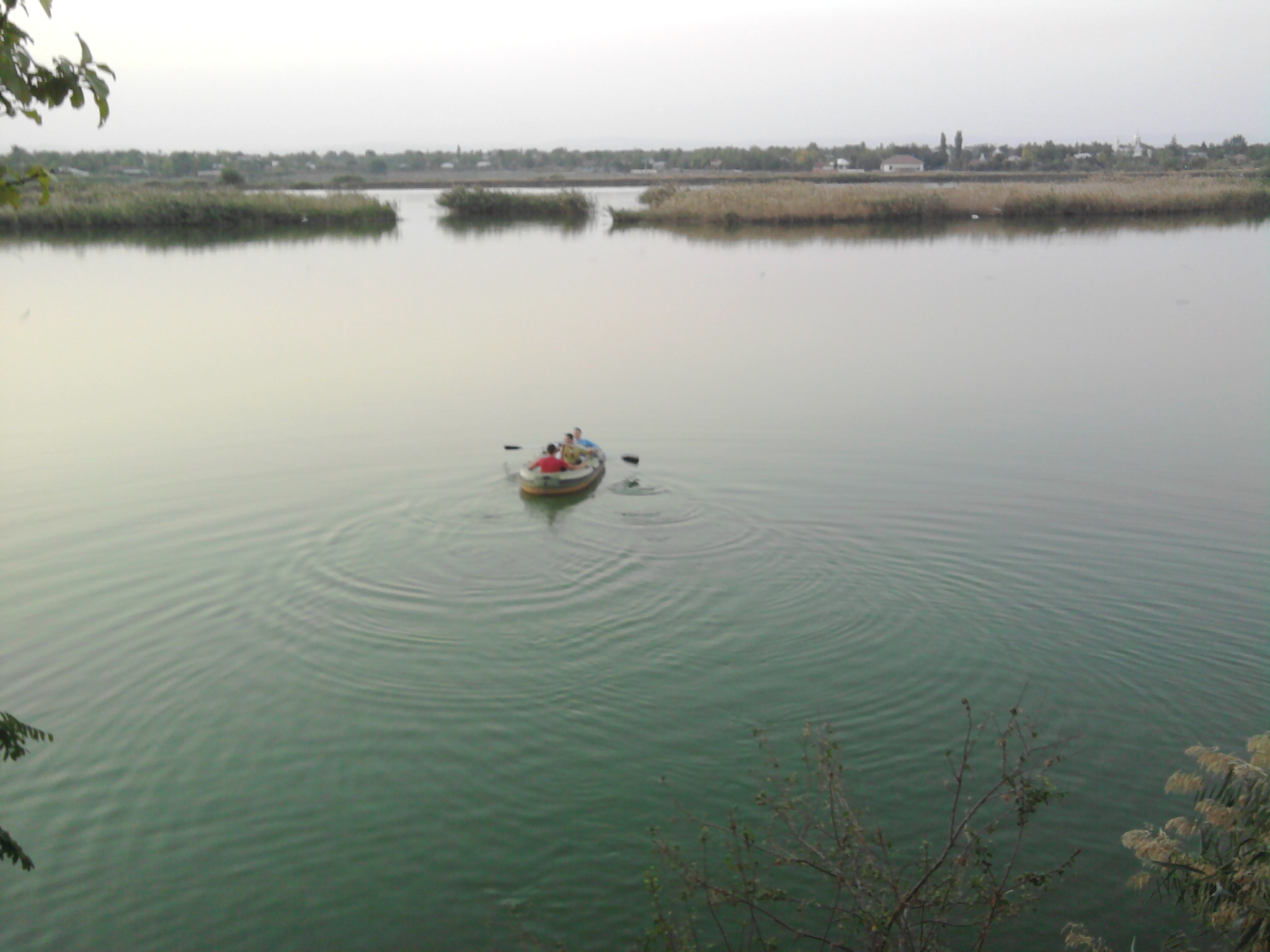
Lake Bălana, between Fulga de Jos and Fulga de Sus
