= Tohăneanca =

River in Romania

- Location within Romania

Location
- Country: Romania
- Counties: Prahova County
- Villages: Valea Scheilor, Vadu Săpat, Mizil

Physical characteristics
- Mouth: Ghighiu
  - location: Mizil
  - coordinates: 45.0046°N 26.4502°E
- Length: 20 km (12 mi)
- Basin size: 63 km^{2} (24 sq mi)

Basin features
- Progression: Ghighiu→ Sărata→ Ialomița→ Danube→ Black Sea

The Tohăneanca is a right tributary of the river Ghighiu in Romania. It flows into the Ghighiu in Mizil. Its length is 20 km (12 mi) and its basin size is 63 km^{2} (24 sq mi).
