= Ghighiu (Sărata) =

- Location within Romania

Location
- Country: Romania
- Counties: Prahova, Ialomița

Physical characteristics
- Mouth: Sărata
  - coordinates: 44.829°N 26.567°E
- Length: 48 km (30 mi)
- Basin size: 563 km^{2} (217 sq mi)

Basin features
- Progression: Sărata→ Ialomița→ Danube→ Black Sea
- Tributaries
  - left: Râiosul, Dulban
  - right: Tohăneanca, Bălana

The Ghighiu is a right tributary of the river Sărata in Romania. It discharges into the Sărata near Jilavele. It flows through the towns and villages Gura Vadului, Mizil, Baba Ana, Gradiștea and Boldești. Its length is 48 km (30 mi) and its basin size is 563 km^{2} (217 sq mi).
