= Boldești =

Boldești may refer to several places in Romania:

== Villages ==
- Boldești, a village in Avram Iancu Commune, Alba County
- Boldești, a village in Hărmănești Commune, Iași County
- Boldești, a village in Boldești-Grădiștea Commune, Prahova County

== Boroughs ==
- Boldești, a borough in Boldești-Scăeni, Prahova County
