= Constantin Stan =

Constantin Stan may refer to:

- Constantin Stan (sport shooter) (born 1959), Romanian sports shooter
- Constantin Stan (footballer) (born 1949), Romanian footballer
- Constantin Stan (rugby union)
- Constantin Stan (racewalker), Romanian racewalker and winner at the Balkan Athletics Championships
