= Petre Strihan =

Romanian poet

Petre Strihan (pen name of Petre Constantinescu; May 27, 1899 – July 25, 1990) was a Romanian poet.

== Biography ==
Born in Mizil, his parents were Ion Constantinescu, a lawyer, and his wife Steliana (née Anastasiu). From 1910 to 1918, he attended high school in Ploiești and Buzău. He then studied law at the University of Bucharest from 1918 to 1921, during which time he worked as a copyist within his faculty. He earned a doctorate in 1925, and worked as an instructor (1928–1938), associate professor (1938–1942) and professor (1942–1947). From 1942 to 1944, under the regime of Ion Antonescu, he was a deputy state secretary. He was active as a lawyer from 1921 to 1945, at which point he was suspended. Between 1956 and 1964, under the communist regime, he successively served as accountant at a worksite in Titu, tutor at a worker cooperative, ticket inspector at Zoo Băneasa, laborer at a chemical plant, archivist and machine operator at another cooperative. From 1964 to 1968, he was documentarian at Bucharest's Nicolae Iorga History Institute, rising to scientific researcher from 1968 to 1970.

Strihan's first published work appeared in Flacăra in 1922, while his first book was the 1929 Penumbre. Between 1922 and 1929, he formed part of the Sburătorul literary circle. During the interwar period, his writings appeared in Adevărul literar, Convorbiri Literare, Viața literară, Universul literar and Slove. After 1964, he wrote for Luceafărul, Gazeta literară and România Literară. His late works, delicate and naive, appeared in Poezii (1968), Moara albastră (1978) and Lumini târzii (1984).
