= Bălana =

- Location within Romania

Location
- Country: Romania
- Counties: Prahova County
- Villages: Rotari, Șoimești, Ceptura de Sus, Ceptura de Jos, Vâlcelele, Parepa-Rușani, Fulga de Jos

Physical characteristics
- Mouth: Ghighiu
  - coordinates: 44.8871°N 26.4841°E
- Length: 39 km (24 mi)
- Basin size: 190 km^{2} (73 sq mi)

Basin features
- Progression: Ghighiu→ Sărata→ Ialomița→ Danube→ Black Sea
- Tributaries
  - right: Valea Războiului

The Bălana is a right tributary of the river Ghighiu in Romania. It flows into the Ghighiu near Fulga de Sus. Its length is 39 km (24 mi) and its basin size is 190 km^{2} (73 sq mi).
