= Constantin Stan (footballer) =

Romanian footballer

Personal information
- Date of birth: 20 October 1949 (age 77)
- Place of birth: Colceag, Romania
- Position: Forward

Youth career
- 1965–1966: Colorom Codlea

Senior career*
Years	Team	Apps	(Gls)
1966–1968	Colorom Codlea		
1968–1969	Metrom Brașov	10	(2)
1969–1970	ASA Târgu Mureș	3	(0)
1970–1971	Chimica Târnăveni	29	(0)
1971–1980	Gloria Buzău	255	(90)
Total		297	(92)

International career
1978–1979	Romania	3	(1)
- * Club domestic league appearances and goals

Constantin Stan (born 20 October 1949) is a Romanian former footballer who played as a forward.

== Club career ==
Stan was born on 20 October 1949 in Colceag, Romania and began playing junior-level football in 1965 at Colorom Codlea. One year later he started to play for the club's senior team in the Romanian lower leagues. In January 1969, he arrived at Metrom Brașov in Divizia B. In 1970 he joined ASA Târgu Mureș, making his Divizia A debut on 14 June under coach Tiberiu Bone in a 2–0 away loss to Universitatea Cluj. After half a year, Stan was sent by ASA to Chimica Târnăveni in exchange for László Bölöni. In 1971 he went to Gloria Buzău in Divizia C, helping the team gain promotion to the second league in his first season. In the 1977–78 season, Gloria earned promotion to the first league, Stan contributing with 16 goals. In the following season he netted 16 goals once again, being the league's second top-scorer with six goals behind Argeș Pitești's Marin Radu. Among these goals were a double in a 4–1 victory against Steaua București and a hat-trick in a 3–1 win over his former side, ASA. On 8 March 1980, Stan made his last Divizia A appearance in Gloria's 1–1 draw against ASA Târgu Mureș, totaling 54 matches with 19 goals in the competition.

== International career ==
Stan played three games for Romania, making his debut at age 29 on 13 December 1978, when coach Ștefan Kovács sent him in the 65th minute to replace Florin Grigore in a 2–1 friendly loss to Greece. In his following match, also a friendly, he scored his only goal for The Tricolours in a 1–1 draw against Israel. His last appearance for the national team was in a 1–1 draw against Cyprus in the Euro 1980 qualifiers.

=== International goals ===
Scores and results list Romania's goal tally first, score column indicates score after each Stan goal.

#	Date	Venue	Opponent	Score	Result	Competition
1	19 December 1978	Bloomfield Stadium, Tel Aviv, Israel	Israel	1–1	1–1	Friendly

== Legacy ==
The stadium in his native Colceag is named after him.

== Honours ==
Gloria Buzău

- Divizia B: 1977–78
- Divizia C: 1971–72
