= Todirești, Iași =

Todirești
- Commune
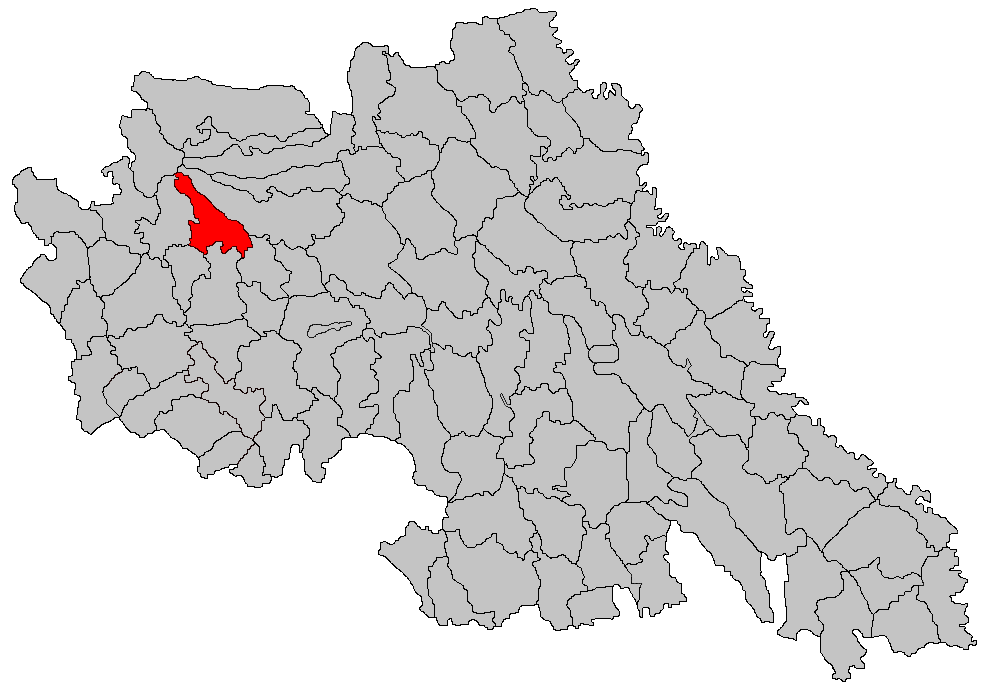
- Location in Iași County

- Location in Romania
- Coordinates: 47°20′N 26°50′E
- Country: Romania
- County: Iași
- Subdivisions: Todirești, Băiceni, Stroești

Government
  - Mayor (2024–2028): Ovidiu Droancă (PNL)
- Area: 44.31 km^{2} (17.11 sq mi)
- Elevation: 410 m (1,350 ft)
- Population (2021-12-01): 4,645
  - Density: 100/km^{2} (270/sq mi)
- Time zone: EET/EEST (UTC+2/+3)
- Postal code: 707505
- Area code: +40 x32
- Vehicle reg.: IS
- Website: primariatodiresti.ro

Todirești is a commune in Iași County, Western Moldavia, Romania. It is composed of three villages: Băiceni, Stroești and Todirești. It also included three other villages until 2004, when these were split off to form Hărmănești Commune.
