= Ana Birchall =

Romanian politician (born 1973)

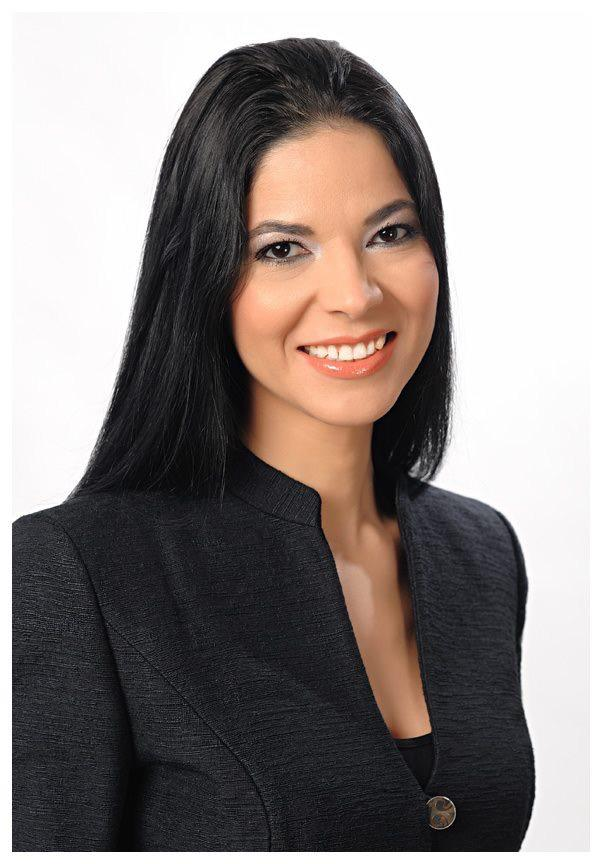
Ana Birchall

Ana Birchall (née Ana Călin; born 30 August 1973) is a Romanian lawyer and politician. Since 2012, Birchall has served as a deputy for Vaslui County representing the Social Democratic Party. In the Victor Ponta and Sorin Grindeanu Cabinets, Birchall served as the Prime Minister's representative for European affairs and the partnership with the United States. After the resignation of Florin Iordache following anti-corruption protests, Birchall served as Minister of Justice, first on an interim basis and later permanently in the Cabinet of Viorica Dăncilă. Between 2019-2019 Ana Birchall was Deputy Prime Minister in charge with the Strategic Partnerships of Romania.

On 12 November 2019 Birchall was expelled from the PSD and as Minister of Justice.

== Biography ==
Ana Birchall was born on 30 August 1973 in Mizil and grew up in Fulga, Prahova County.

Birchall received her bachelor's degree in law and received her master's degree from Yale Law School in the United States specializing in bankruptcy law and International financial law. Birchall graduated from Yale magna cum laude.

Birchall continued her studies at Yale Law and pursued her Juris Doctor under Anthony T. Kronman. Her doctorate thesis was a comparative analysis of bankruptcy law between the United States, the United Kingdom, France, Germany, Romania, Hungary, Poland and the Czech Republic.

After her doctorate studies, Birchall worked as a lawyer on Wall Street in New York for legal firm White & Case, Her clients included ENRON, MCI-Worldcom, United Airlines, US Airways and UPC.

In 2003, Birchall decided to return to Romania and enter the political sphere. Birchall began her career internally within the Social Democrats, serving as an advisor to the Minister of External Affairs and later as head of equal opportunities in the party, head of education and research for the party, and as the spokesperson for the local Bucharest wing of the party.

Birchall also continued her legal career as a member of the Bucharest Bar and continued her work with White & Case LLP

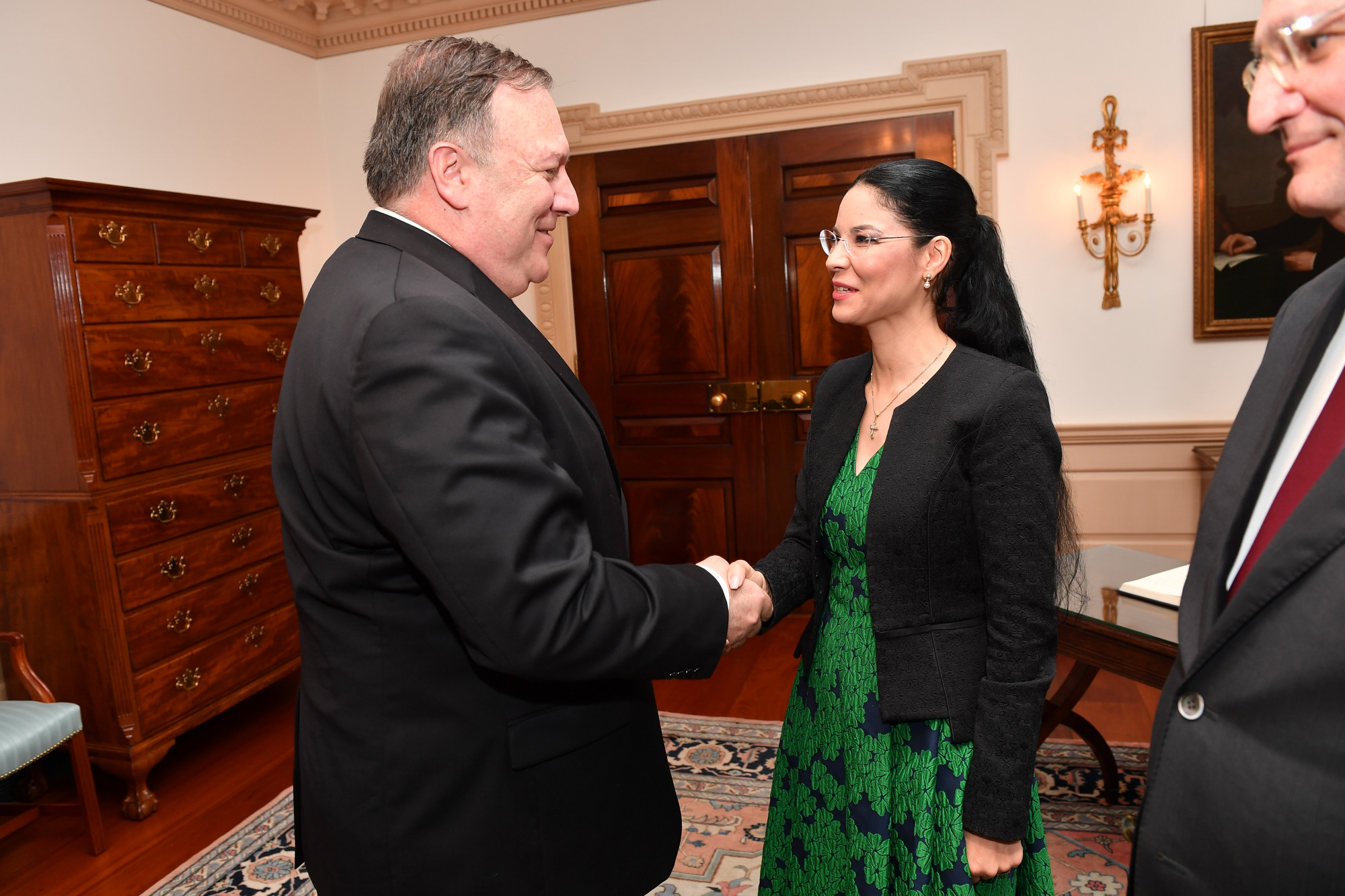
Birchall meets with U.S. Secretary of State Michael R. Pompeo at the U.S. Department of State in Washington, D.C. on 15 June 2018.

In 1998, Birchall married British businessman Martyn Birchall. The two had a son, Andrew in 2001. They live in Bucharest.

In January 2017, Birchall was appointed Minister for Europe and, in 2019, she was preparing for Romania’s presidency of the EU Council. Following the widespread public protest in early 2017, she was appointed Interim Minister of Justice. She was forced out of the government in June 2017. In January 2018, Birchall was appointed Deputy Prime Minister with responsibility of Strategic Partnerships. From April 2019, she resumed her post as Interim Minister of Justice during a time of concern with regard to the course of judicial reform and the fight against corruption. Afterwards, in May 2019, she assumed the responsibility of Minister of Justice. During 2020, she managed to guide parliamentary legislation that for the first time effectively addressed the recovery of assets gained as the proceeds of crime.

As of December 2023, she was the Special Envoy for Strategic and International Affairs at Nuclearelectrica, the Romanian nuclear power energy company.

== Defamation and false cases ==
In May 2008, a legal application for divorce was submitted under Birchall's name in Bucharest's First District Court. Birchall, who found out about the application from the press, submitted a request to cancel the application. Birchall later proved that the application was not hers, and that the signature was different than her own. Birchall accused political opponents of trying to discredit her ahead of local and parliamentary elections, as her name was being circulated as a future minister of education.

In September 2008, in the middle of the election campaign, Birchall faced another scandal. Iosif Buble of Antena 1 released a 34-second video on the internet which purported to show a woman similar to Birchall in intimate poses with an unknown man. Birchall vehemently denied the allegations, and brought out a forensic expert who said that the a person in the video was physically different than her. Cancan magazine apologized to Birchall and her family for the story and retracted their claims about Birchall's appearance in the film.

Birchall sued Iosif Buble in court, alleging that it was part of a campaign of denigration and defamation against her political career. The court ruled in favor of Birchall in both the first instance and the appeal.

== Bibliography ==
- Andreea Țuligă, „M-am trezit cu câteva SMS-uri «deocheate»”, Evenimentul zilei, 10 august 2008
