= Vadu Săpat =

- Commune
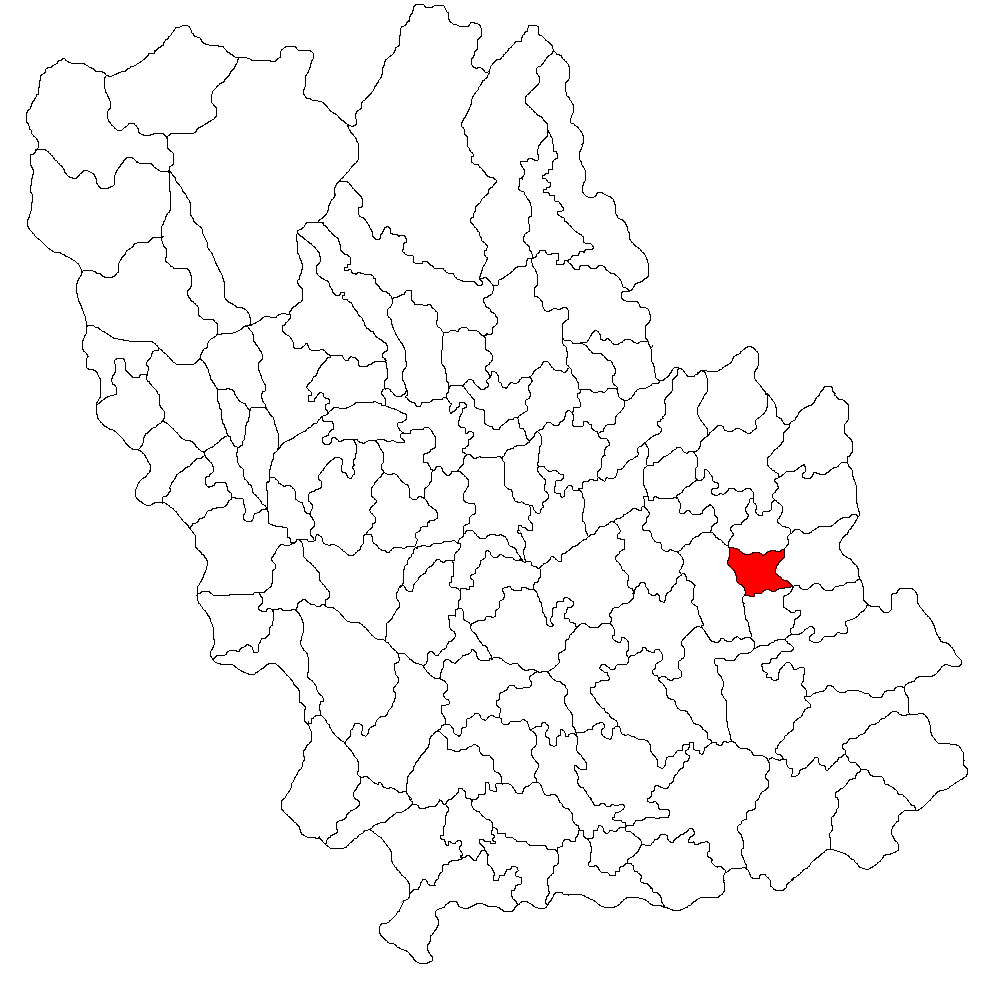
- Location in Prahova County

- Location in Romania
- Coordinates: 45°2′N 26°23′E
- Country: Romania
- County: Prahova

Government
  - Mayor (2024–2028): Adrian Tăbîrcă (PSD)
- Area: 17.07 km^{2} (6.59 sq mi)
- Elevation: 159 m (522 ft)
- Population (2021-12-01): 1,528
  - Density: 90/km^{2} (230/sq mi)
- Time zone: EET/EEST (UTC+2/+3)
- Postal code: 107244
- Area code: +(40) 244
- Vehicle reg.: PH
- Website: comunavadusapat.ro

Vadu Săpat is a commune in Prahova County, Muntenia, Romania. It is composed of three villages: Ghinoaica, Ungureni, and Vadu Săpat. Until 2004, these belonged to Fântânele Commune, when they were split off to form a separate commune.

Historical population
Year	Pop.	±%
2002	1,843	—
2011	1,678	−9.0%
2021	1,528	−8.9%
Source: Census data
