= Colceag =

- Commune
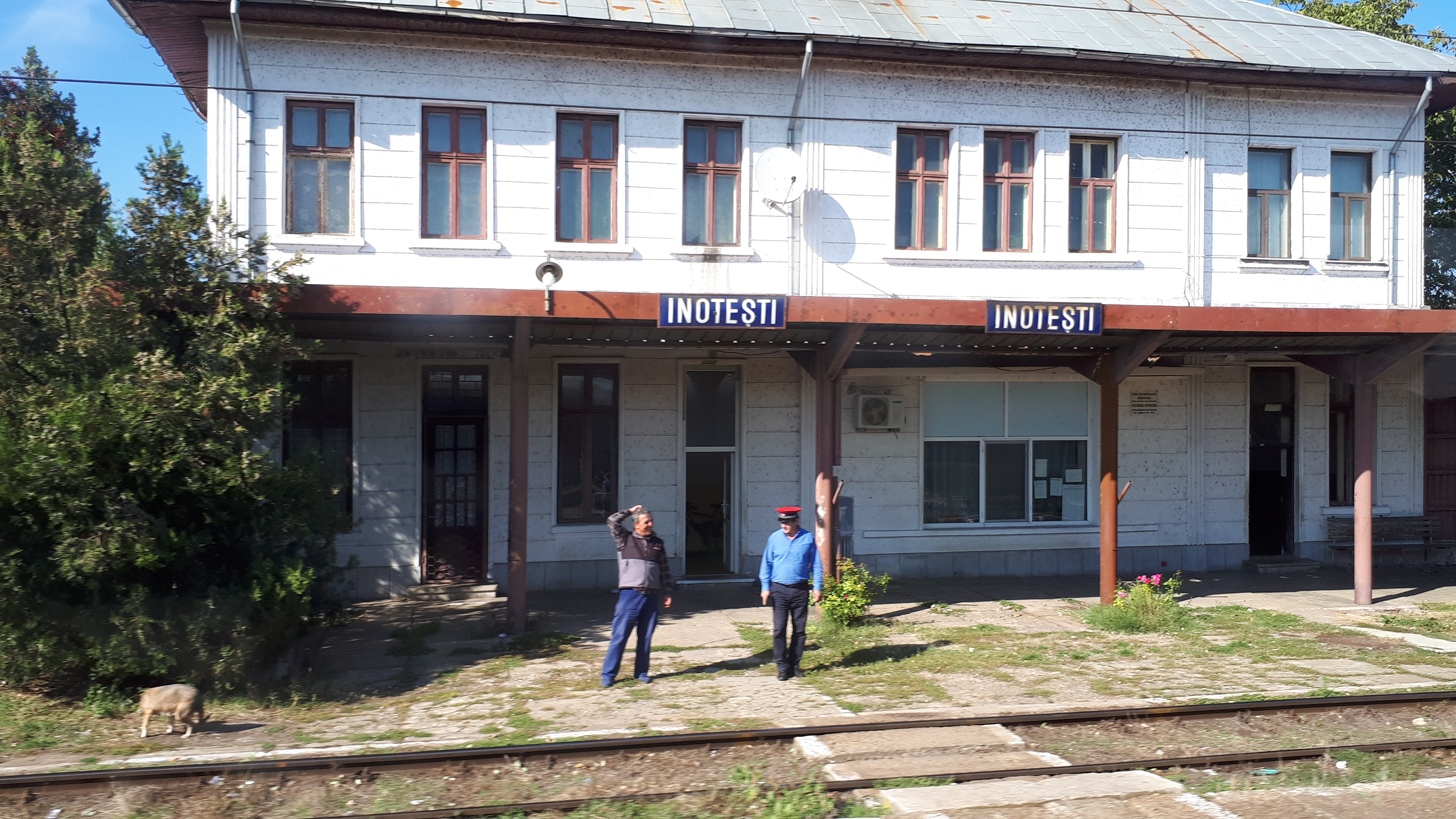
- Inotești train station

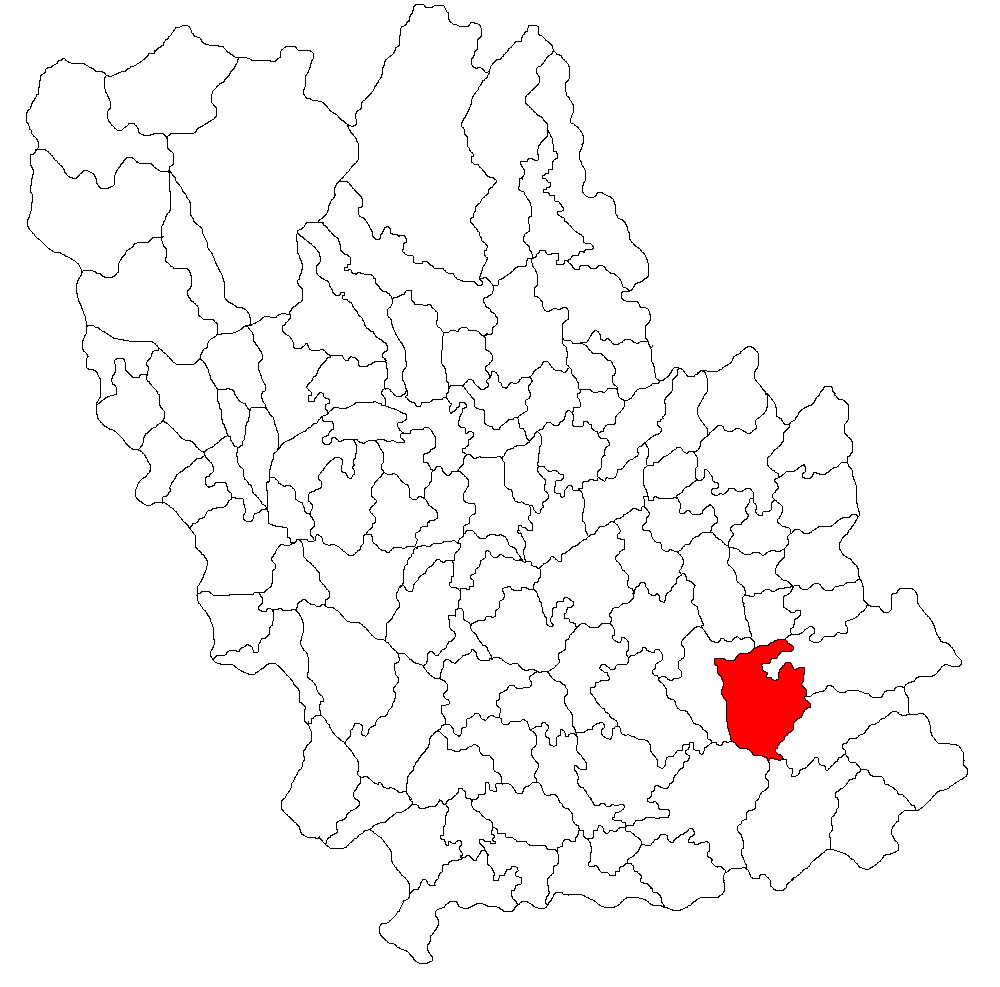
- Location in Prahova County

- Location in Romania
- Coordinates: 44°57′N 26°21′E
- Country: Romania
- County: Prahova

Government
  - Mayor (2024–2028): Ionuț Soare (PNL)
- Area: 58.05 km^{2} (22.41 sq mi)
- Elevation: 103 m (338 ft)
- Population (2021-12-01): 4,413
  - Density: 76.02/km^{2} (196.9/sq mi)
- Time zone: UTC+02:00 (EET)
  - Summer (DST): UTC+03:00 (EEST)
- Postal code: 107170
- Area code: +(40) 244
- Vehicle reg.: PH
- Website: www.comunacolceag.ro

Colceag is a commune in Prahova County, Muntenia, Romania. It is composed of four villages: Colceag, Inotești, Parepa-Rușani, and Vâlcelele.

The commune is situated in the Wallachian Plain, at an altitude of 103 m (338 ft), on the banks of the river Bălana. It is located in the southeastern extremity of Prahova County, 32 km (20 mi) east of the county seat, Ploiești. The Inotești train station serves the CFR Main Line 500, which starts in Bucharest, goes through Ploiești and Buzău, and continues towards Moldavia.

Historical population
Year	Pop.	±%
1992	5,941	—
2002	5,569	−6.3%
2011	5,103	−8.4%
2021	4,413	−13.5%
Source: Census data
