= Mizil =

- Town
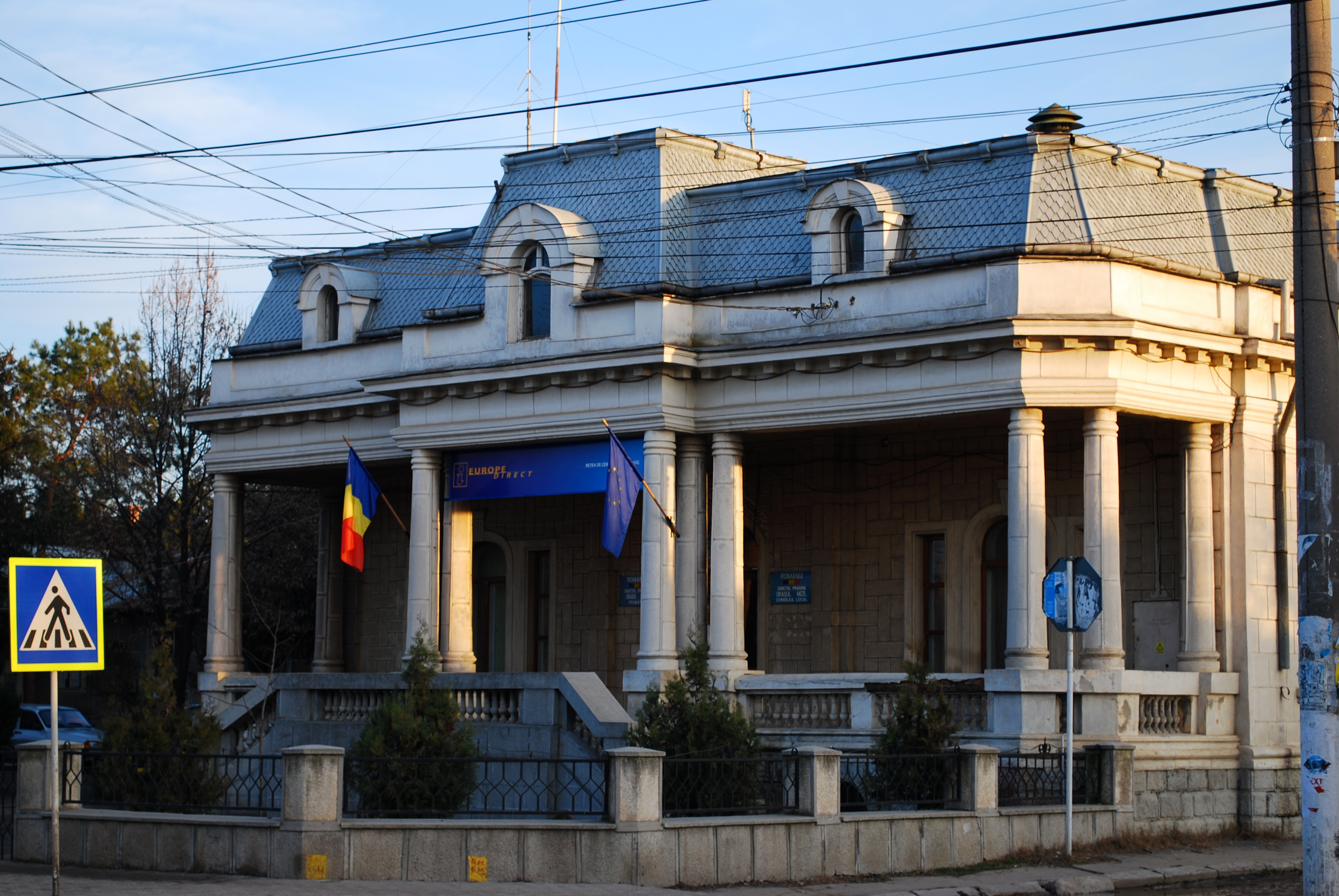
- Mizil town hall

- Coat of arms

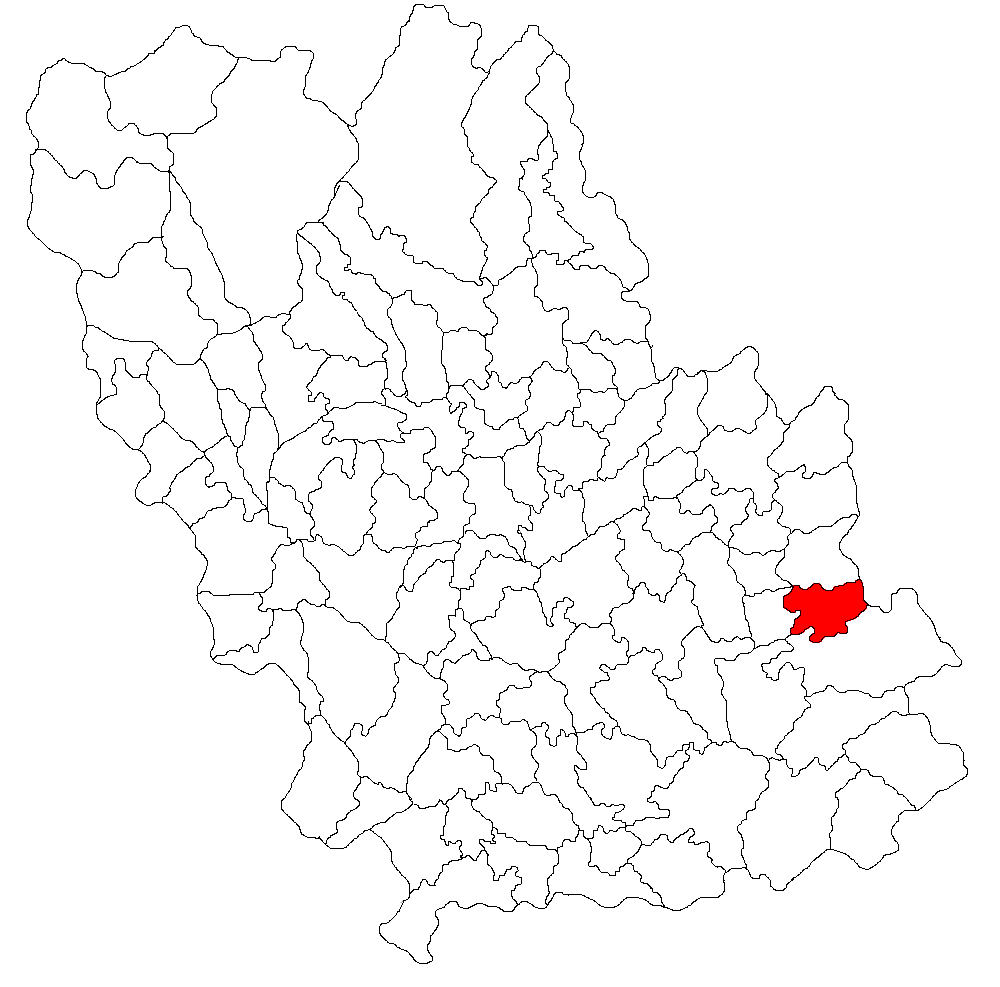
- Location in Prahova County

- Location in Romania
- Coordinates: 45°0′0″N 26°26′26″E
- Country: Romania
- County: Prahova
- Subdivisions: Fefelei, Mizil

Government
  - Mayor (2024–2028): Silviu Negraru (PSD)
- Area: 19.32 km^{2} (7.46 sq mi)
- Elevation: 124 m (407 ft)
- Population (2021-12-01): 12,962
  - Density: 670.9/km^{2} (1,738/sq mi)
- Time zone: UTC+02:00 (EET)
  - Summer (DST): UTC+03:00 (EEST)
- Postal code: 105800
- Area code: (+40) 02 44
- Vehicle reg.: PH
- Website: www.primaria-mizil.ro

Mizil (Romanian pronunciation: [miˈzil]) is a town in Prahova County, Muntenia, Romania. Located in the southeastern part of the county, it lies along the road between the cities of Ploiești and Buzău, and to the northeast of the national capital, Bucharest. Its position led it to become a thriving market town beginning in the 18th century, before a long period of economic decline began in the early 20th century. Agriculture gave way to industry as the chief employment under the Communist regime, but the town has continued to face difficulties in the wake of a late-1990s deindustrialisation.

== Geography ==
The town is situated in southeastern Prahova County, on the border with Buzău County; the four rural localities that surround it are Gura Vadului (north), Baba Ana (south), Săhăteni (east) and Fântânele (west). The Tohani, Pietroasa and Istrița vineyards are all nearby. It is 35 km distant from both Ploiești and Buzău, with Bucharest 92 km to the southwest. Mizil is the only city or town in Romania to lie on the 45th parallel north. Located on a series of fields with altitudes of 80–95 m, it is on the Mizil Plain, a subdivision of the Bucureștilor Plain, in turn part of the Wallachian Plain, and has been called the "gate to the Bărăgan", a reference to the plain extending to its east. It is also on the edge of the plain region and the southern reaches of foothills leading up to the Southern Carpathians, being bounded by the Sărata Plain to the south and by Istrița Hill to the northeast. The area's rocks are Neogene molasse; there is also gravel and sand. Near the surface, there are loess layers of different thickness.

Mizil covers 1931 ha, of which 77.7% are agricultural land, water, forests and green spaces, and 22.3% are developed. The Istău stream runs through it. The town administers one village, Fefelei, although this is essentially a neighbourhood today.

== Climate ==
Mizil has a humid subtropical climate (Cfa in the Köppen climate classification).

Climate data for Mizil
Month	Jan	Feb	Mar	Apr	May	Jun	Jul	Aug	Sep	Oct	Nov	Dec	Year
Mean daily maximum °C (°F)	2.8 (37.0)	5.7 (42.3)	11 (52)	16.6 (61.9)	22 (72)	25.7 (78.3)	27.9 (82.2)	28.2 (82.8)	22.6 (72.7)	16.1 (61.0)	10.2 (50.4)	4.7 (40.5)	16.1 (61.1)
Daily mean °C (°F)	−1.2 (29.8)	1 (34)	5.7 (42.3)	11.3 (52.3)	16.8 (62.2)	20.8 (69.4)	23 (73)	23 (73)	17.6 (63.7)	11.3 (52.3)	6 (43)	0.7 (33.3)	11.3 (52.4)
Mean daily minimum °C (°F)	−4.7 (23.5)	−3.2 (26.2)	0.3 (32.5)	5.2 (41.4)	10.6 (51.1)	14.9 (58.8)	17 (63)	17.2 (63.0)	12.3 (54.1)	6.8 (44.2)	2.4 (36.3)	−2.5 (27.5)	6.4 (43.5)
Average precipitation mm (inches)	41 (1.6)	38 (1.5)	47 (1.9)	59 (2.3)	76 (3.0)	80 (3.1)	74 (2.9)	44 (1.7)	55 (2.2)	52 (2.0)	47 (1.9)	48 (1.9)	661 (26)
Source: https://en.climate-data.org/europe/romania/prahova/mizil-13295/

== Demographics ==
Historical population
Year	Pop.	±%
1912	6,358	—
1930	6,440	+1.3%
1948	6,528	+1.4%
1956	7,460	+14.3%
1966	10,334	+38.5%
1977	13,189	+27.6%
1992	17,090	+29.6%
2002	17,075	−0.1%
2011	14,312	−16.2%
2021	12,962	−9.4%
Source: Census data

At the 2021 census, the town had a population of 12,962. Of Mizil's 14,312 residents at the 2011 census, 83.7% were ethnic Romanians and 16.3% were Roma. One 2008 estimate put the number of Roma at 5,000 or 30.5% of the population estimated at the time. At the same census, according to religion, 93.9% were Romanian Orthodox, 5.4% Pentecostal, 0.7% other or none. (Census figures refer to inhabitants for whom data were available; there were no ethnic or religious statistics for 6.9% of residents.)

Between 2002 and 2021, Mizil's population fell from 17,075 to 12,962, a drop of 24.1%. Reasons for this trend include lower birth rate, emigration and poor economic conditions.

== History ==
Mizil was mentioned in 1529, in an official document at Brașov. It was first mentioned as Eșteu in 1585, and as Istau in 1591, after its stream. Around the turn of the 18th century, Prince Constantin Brâncoveanu owned the village, building houses at the nearby Corbeanca Dealul Dumbăvii vineyard and establishing an annual fair in Mizil that would become renowned. It was during the 18th century that a mail coach station for changing horses opened in the village. Merchants began to set up shop, their business augmented by the location between two larger towns; coachmen, wheelwrights, woodcutters and watchmen also found work. In the Ottoman Turkish language of Wallachia's rulers, the station was known as a menzil. The n dropped out through syncope and the i became an e; given that activity and transactions that took place around it, the resulting name came to be used for the village as a whole and to replace its old name. The first church was built in 1790, and Mizil was declared a town in 1830.

Mizil reached its peak of activity during the 19th century, rapidly outpacing Urlați, which had possessed the advantage of having the closest market to most of the towns in that part of Wallachia. Moreover, in 1847 the Ploiești-Buzău road began to be built along the foothills, shortening and modernising the link between the capitals of the Danubian Principalities, Bucharest and Iași. It was from the latter to the former city that Alexandru Ioan Cuza passed through Mizil in 1859, on his way to become head of the United Principalities. In this period, inhabitants worked in agriculture, viniculture, animal husbandry and various trades. The first school was built in 1857, by the boyar Ion Căciunescu, although teaching had begun around 1838. Following the efforts of mayor Leonida Condeescu, an elementary trade school was established about 1902, with a high school opening later.

The town's rapid growth slowed down in the first half of the 20th century, eventually stagnating. In the 1950s and '60s, under the Communist regime, it was the centre of Mizil raion in Regiunea Ploiești. During this time, industry—textiles, wood and mechanics—came to be a chief source of employment for inhabitants.

== Government, economy and infrastructure ==
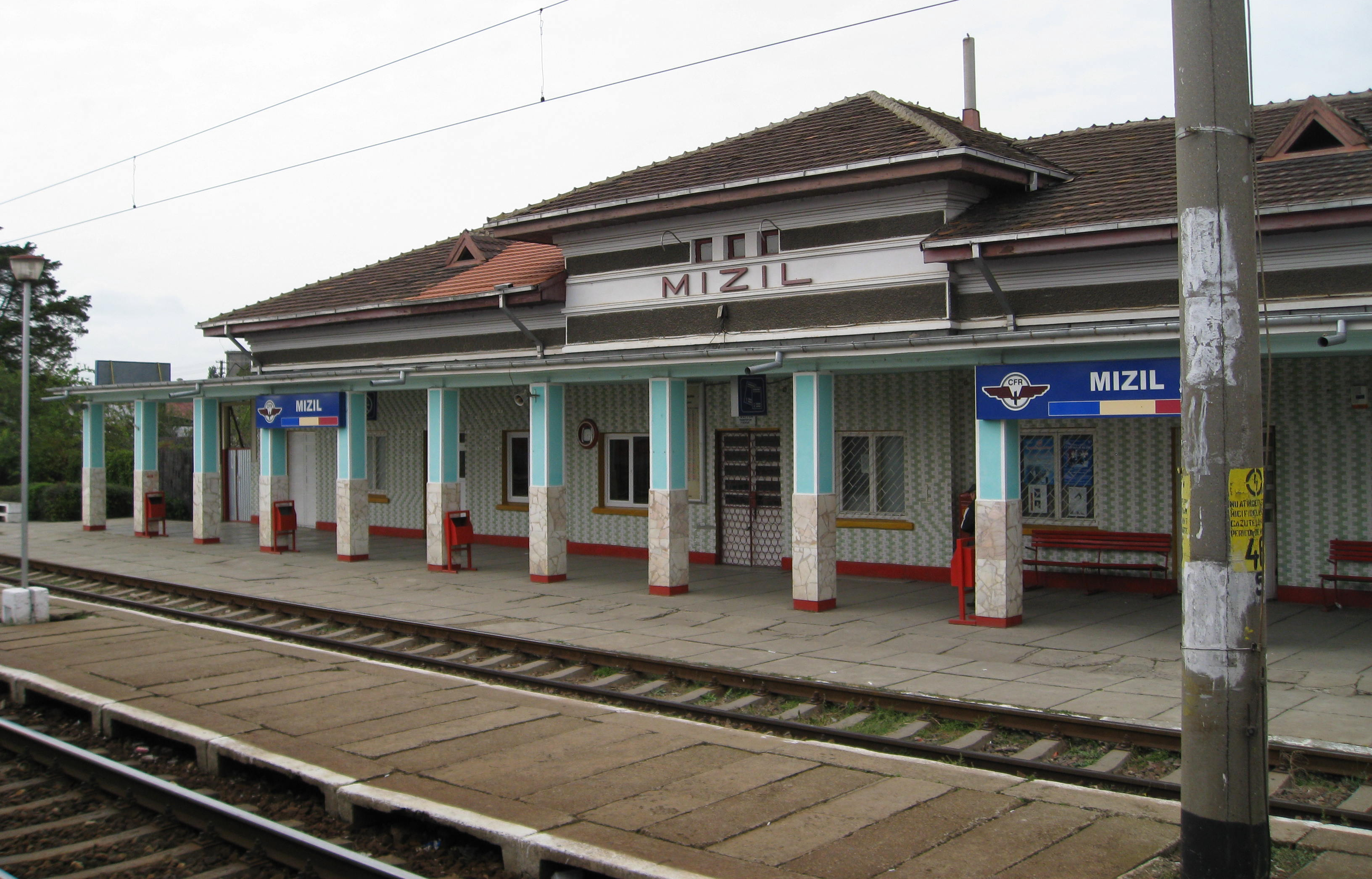
Mizil train station

Mizil is governed by a mayor and 17-member local council. Since the 2016 local election, six councillors belong to the Social Democratic Party, five each to the National Liberal Party and the Alliance of Liberals and Democrats, and one to the Christian Democratic National Peasants' Party.

Running water comes from Bălțești and is supplied by a private company on a network built in 1968. Since 2005, garbage collection is done by a private firm contracted by town hall. In 2002, the town switched from heating oil to natural gas, supplied by a public utility. There is also an electricity network, and the street lights were modernised in 2006. Mizil has 35 km of roads, 36% of which are asphalted. The most significant of these is the Ploiești-Buzău European route E577 that links Bucharest with Moldavia. There is no public transportation, but there are private buses running to Ploiești, Buzău and surrounding communes, as well as taxis. There is also a Căile Ferate Române train station, lying between Ploiești and Buzău. Companies active in Mizil offer fixed and mobile telephone services, cable television, Internet, postal services, banking and gasoline.

As of 2002, Mizil had 8 ha of green space, including roadsides and parks. Agriculture was a primary occupation for the town's inhabitants in the 19th and early 20th centuries, but is much reduced in importance as of the early 21st. Still, as of 2005, 1448 of the total 1931 ha are agricultural land, of which 89% is cultivated arable land, 7% pastures and 6% vineyards. Since 1990, the small tracts of land used for producing hay and growing fruit trees have been converted to other uses.

During the Communist era, Mizil depended for employment on three large factories employing almost the entire workforce. The largest, established in 1951, produced armaments; the next turned out spun textiles and the smallest made mattresses. The town reached an economic nadir in 1998-1999, when these laid off thousands of workers. One factory, formerly employing 8,500, fired all but around 400, while another dismissed almost all its 2,000 employees. Unemployment rose to 17.5% (against a national average of 8.7%); including those who had stopped looking for work, unemployment reached 80% of the working-age population (18 to 62). Poverty had reached alarming levels, with tension and crime also rising, particularly among the generally jobless, under-educated Roma. As of 2005, 39% of Mizil firms are involved in commerce, 15% in services, 12% in industry, 11% in construction, 5% in agriculture, 3% in transport, and 15% in other domains. That year, the working-age population was 65% of the total, of whom 30% had jobs. Roma represented a significant portion of the 70% who did not. Due to the factory closings, there was a dramatic fall in employment between 1994 and 2001; even with a slight rise in subsequent years, the workforce only reached half the 1994 level.

There is one hospital in Mizil, serving the town and surrounding communes.

== Culture ==
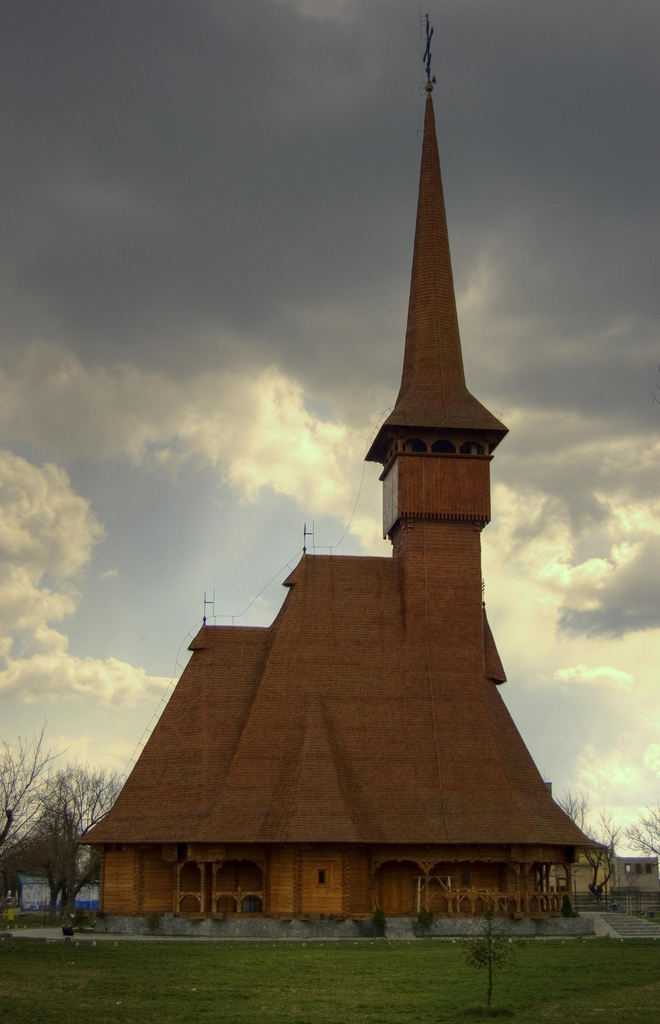
Saints Joachim and Anna Orthodox Church, in Maramureș style (completed 2007)

The town houses two high schools, three primary schools and five kindergartens. One high school is focused on physics, chemistry, biology and computer science, while the other prepares students to become technicians.

Mizil has three historic Orthodox churches. The oldest, dedicated to the Holy Trinity, dates to the late 18th century and is in Fefelei. Another one, dedicated to John the Baptist, is in the town centre and was built in 1857. The building is cross-in-square in form and Byzantine and Gothic in style, with Renaissance touches. Its original painting was lost; a restoration took place in 1916. The iconostasis is sculpted out of linden wood and covered with gold leaf in folk art fashion. A third church, consecrated to the Dormition of the Theotokos and located in the town square, is from 1865. Among its sacred objects is a wooden blessing cross featuring silver filigree work and twenty-four red gems; this is from the end of the 19th century and appears to be the work of an anonymous artist from the Russian school. Additionally, there are four 19th-century roadside crosses, two of which are considered historic monuments by the Culture Ministry.

A monument dedicated to the troops of the 72nd Mizil Infantry Regiment, who fought during the Romanian Campaign of World War I (1916-1917), stands in the town. Built in 1921, the pedestal is 1.8 m high and the sculptures reach 2.7 m. They depict a woman in folk costume embodying the Fatherland, with her right hand raised in salute and her left holding the standard; a soldier and a woman sitting before her, the latter with an open book on her knees and representing History. There is a bronze plaque showing a battle scene, another featuring an inscription, and others naming the 1190 officers and enlisted men who died in battle.

There is a public library. There is also a cultural house, built in 1965-1966. This has 384 seats and a stage of around 50m^{2}; the building was modernised in the mid-2000s. Social and cultural activities take place there, with well-known theatrical troupes occasionally performing. There is a children's chess club in the house, and chess can also be played seasonally in the town park. The town's festival days take place during October.

The playwright Ion Luca Caragiale was a friend of mayor Condeescu, whom he parodied in his work; the latter's conversations with Caragiale and with Mihai Eminescu's brother Matei, a soldier assigned to Mizil and who became the mayor's brother-in-law, convinced him to build a theatre. It had 200 seats and opened in 1895; among the plays staged were Caragiale's. After falling into a state of degradation, it was demolished in 1968. A cinema used to operate in Mizil; this was sold to a company that promised to continue screening films but did not do so.

Aside from Caragiale, the journalist Geo Bogza, writing after the town's economic decline had begun, helped impress on the public Mizil's image as a place where nothing important ever happens, in a 1938 reportage titled 175 de minute la Mizil ("175 Minutes in Mizil") and summarised as "the adventure of the banal". Other literary portrayals have been undertaken by local writers, including the poets Mihai Negulescu and Petre Strihan; the journalist and poet George Ranetti (Romeo și Julieta la Mizil, "Romeo and Juliet in Mizil"); Joachim Botez (Însemnările unui Belfer, "Notes of an Idle Rich Man"; Minerva la Mizil, "Minerva at Mizil"; De la Piatra la Mizil, "From Piatra to Mizil"; Împușcat la Mizil, "Gunned Down in Mizil"); and the novels of Cosmin Manolache since 2000, including Ce față cumplită am ("What a Cruel Face I Have").

== Sport ==
As of 1964, the football team Rapid Mizil was playing in Divizia C. By the 1985–1986 season, Mizil had a stadium, modernized by the town's mechanical plant, which owned and financed the Steaua Mizil team that played in Divizia B until it was disbanded in 2006. The abandoned stadium is now in an advanced state of degradation. There is a town-financed boxing club, as well as a modern gymnasium opened in 2007, allowing for sports such as volleyball, handball and tennis to be played.

== Natives ==
- Cătălin Avramescu (born 1967), philosopher, academic, and diplomat
- Agatha Bacovia (1895–1981), poet
- Ana Birchall (born 1973), lawyer and politician
- Gheorghe Eminescu (1890–1988), historian, memoirist, and officer
- Alexandru Ghiban (born 1986), water polo player
- Octav Mayer (1895–1966), mathematician
- Ion Panait (born 1981), Greco-Roman wrestler
- George Ranetti (1875–1928), poet, journalist, and playwright
- Gabriel Sandu (born 1963), economist and politician
- Petre Strihan (1899–1990), poet
- Iulian Tameș (born 1978), football player and coach
- Grigore Tocilescu (1850–1909), historian and archaeologist, member of the Romanian Academy

== Twin towns ==
Mizil is twinned with:

- (Moldova) Iargara
- (Netherlands) Lingewaard
