= Hărmănești =

- Commune
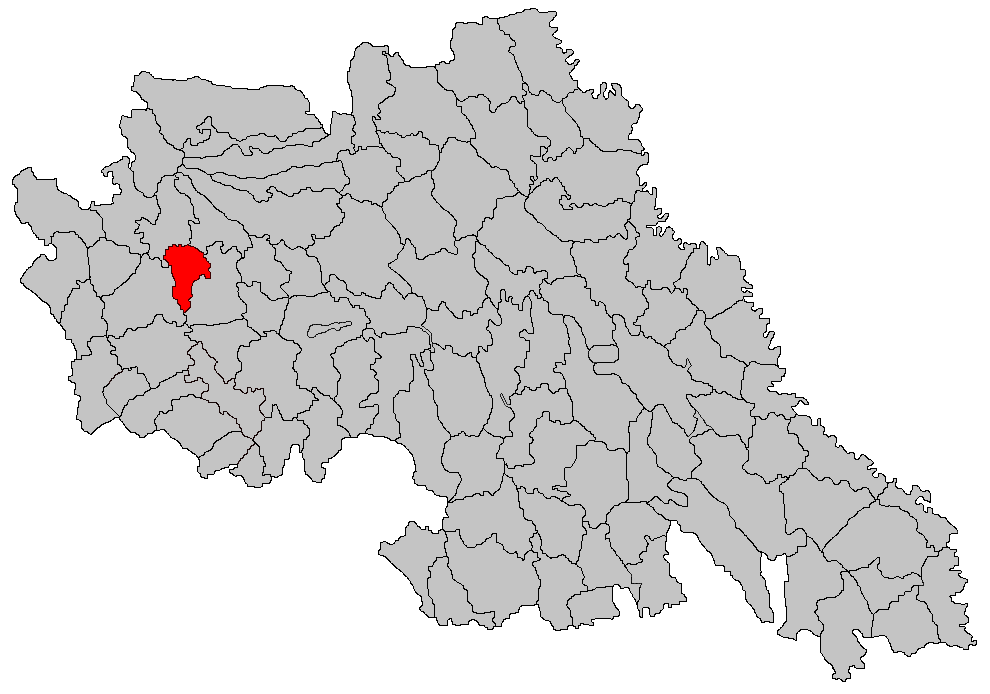
- Location in Iași County

- Location in Romania
- Coordinates: 47°16′N 26°48′E
- Country: Romania
- County: Iași
- Subdivisions: Hărmăneștii Vechi, Boldești, Hărmăneștii Noi

Government
  - Mayor (2024–2028): Ioan Secrieru (PNL)
- Area: 30.8 km^{2} (11.9 sq mi)
- Elevation: 265 m (869 ft)
- Population (2021-12-01): 2,344
  - Density: 76/km^{2} (200/sq mi)
- Time zone: EET/EEST (UTC+2/+3)
- Postal code: 707509
- Area code: +40 x32
- Vehicle reg.: IS
- Website: primaria-harmanesti.ro

Hărmănești is a commune in Iași County, Western Moldavia, Romania. It is composed of three villages: Boldești, Hărmăneștii Noi and Hărmăneștii Vechi (the commune center). These were part of Todirești Commune until 2004, when they were split off.
