= Fântânele, Prahova =

Fântânele
- Commune
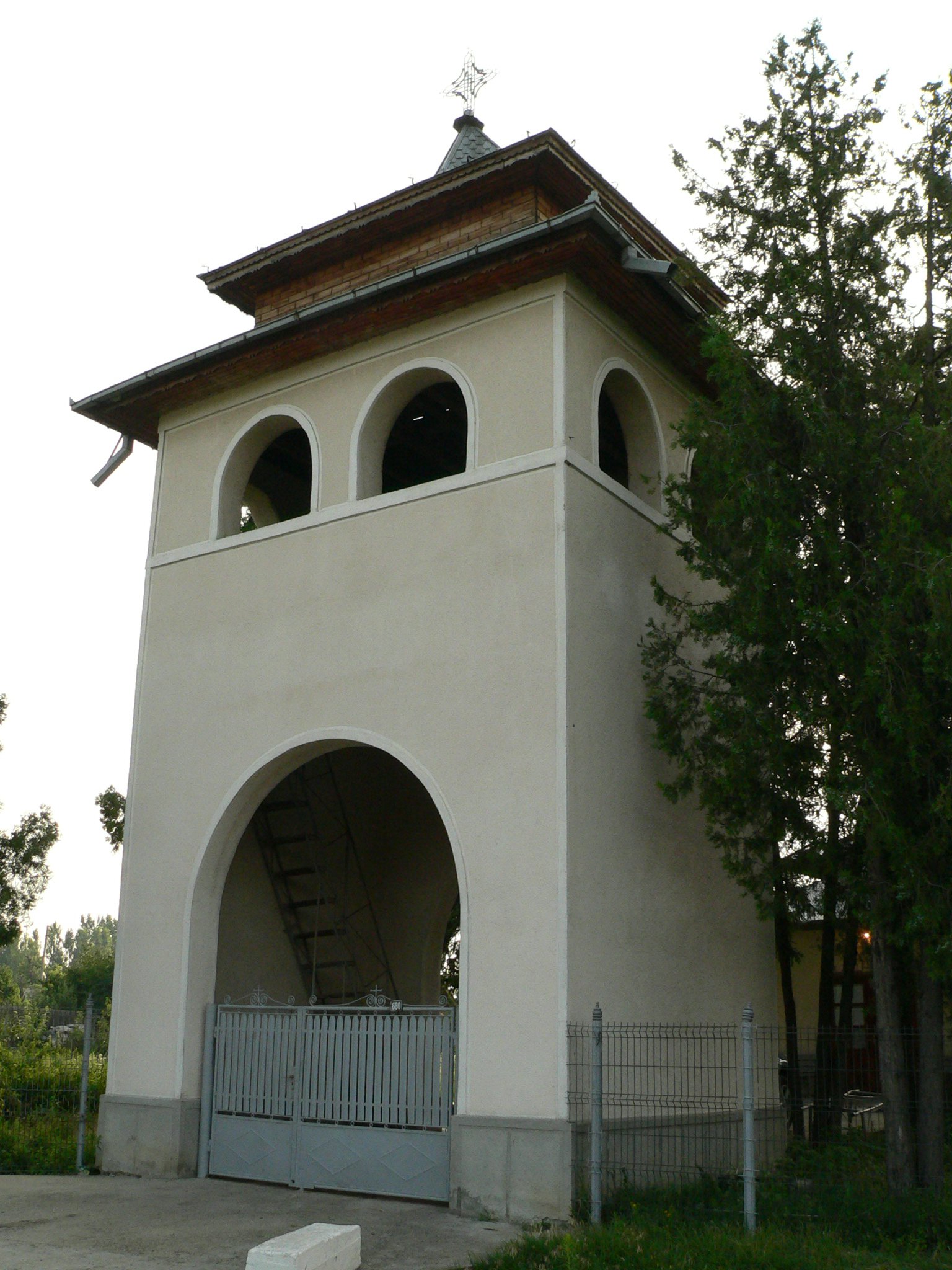
- Church of the Assumption of Mary of the Ungureni in Fântânele

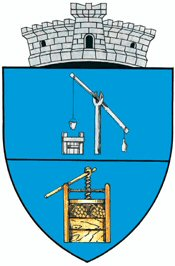
- Coat of arms

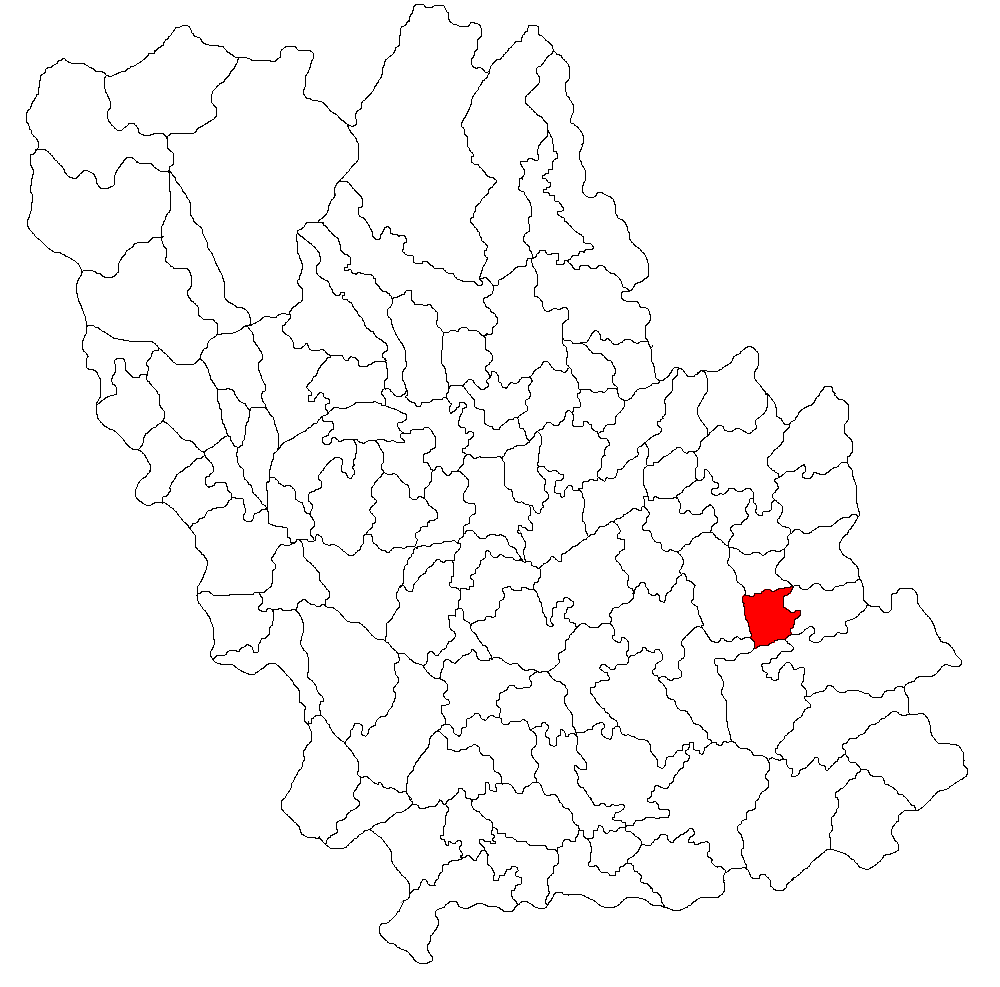
- Location in Prahova County

- Location in Romania
- Coordinates: 45°0′N 26°23′E
- Country: Romania
- County: Prahova

Government
  - Mayor (2024–2028): Constantin Nițu (PSD)
- Elevation: 135 m (443 ft)
- Population (2021-12-01): 1,821
- Time zone: UTC+02:00 (EET)
  - Summer (DST): UTC+03:00 (EEST)
- Postal code: 107240
- Area code: +(40) 244
- Vehicle reg.: PH
- Website: primaria-fantanele.ro

Fântânele is a commune in Prahova County, Muntenia, Romania. It is composed of two villages, Bozieni and Fântânele. It also included Ghinoaica, Ungureni and Vadu Săpat villages until 2004, when they were split off to form Vadu Săpat commune.

Historical population
Year	Pop.	±%
2002	2,277	—
2011	1,953	−14.2%
2021	1,821	−6.8%
Source: Census data
