= Baba Ana =

- Commune
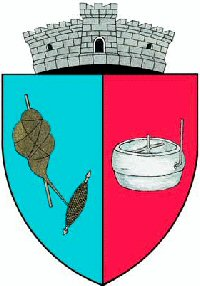
- Coat of arms

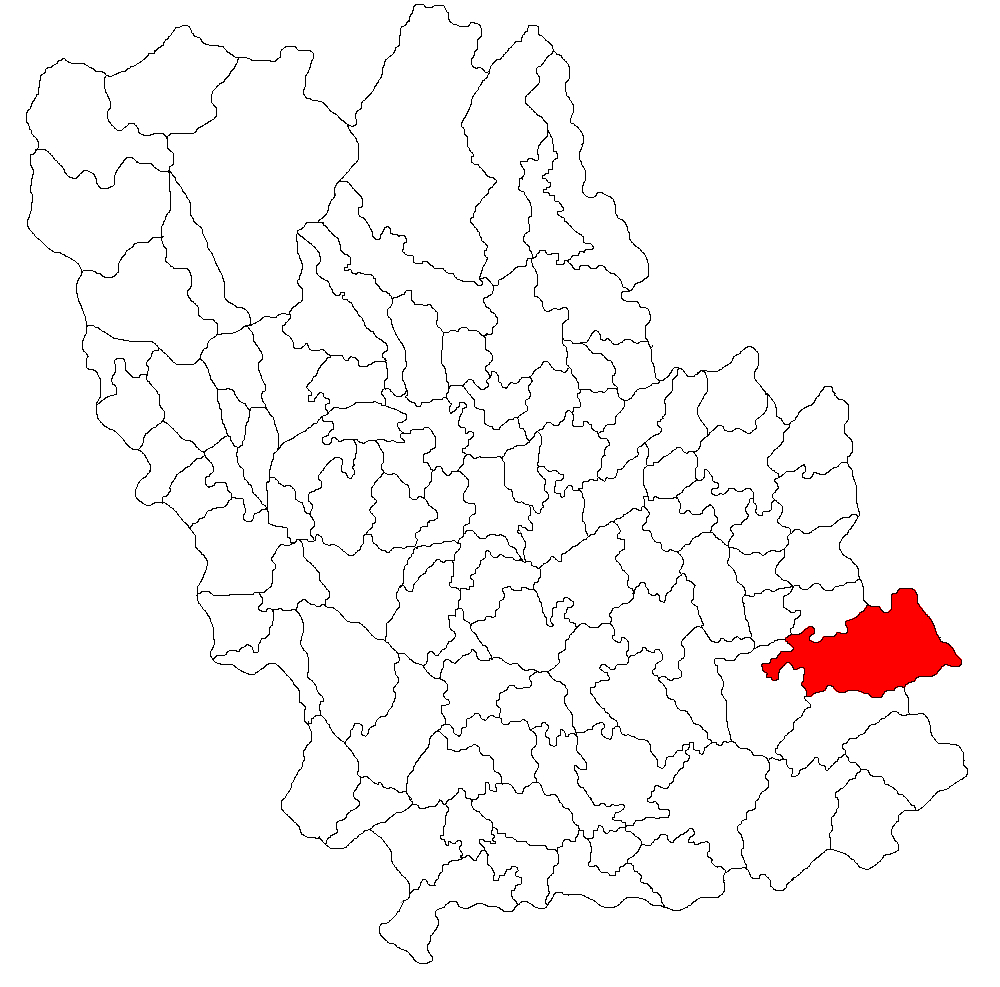
- Location in Prahova County

- Location in Romania
- Coordinates: 44°58′N 26°27′E
- Country: Romania
- County: Prahova

Government
  - Mayor (2020–2024): Ion Dragu (PNL)
- Area: 83.28 km^{2} (32.15 sq mi)
- Elevation: 97 m (318 ft)
- Population (2021-12-01): 3,546
  - Density: 43/km^{2} (110/sq mi)
- Time zone: EET/EEST (UTC+2/+3)
- Postal code: 107035
- Area code: +(40) x44
- Vehicle reg.: PH
- Website: www.primariababaana.ro

Baba Ana is a commune in Prahova County, Muntenia, Romania. It is composed of five villages: Baba Ana, Cireșanu, Conduratu, Crângurile, and Satu Nou.

The commune lies in the Wallachian Plain, on the banks of the river Ghighiu. It is located in the southeastern part of Prahova County, on the border with Buzău County, just south of the town of Mizil and 40 km (25 mi) east of the county seat, Ploiești.

The national road DN1B, which runs from Ploiești to Buzău via Mizil, passes close to the northern side of the commune. The A7 motorway (currently under construction) will have an exit at Cireșanu.

Historical population
Year	Pop.	±%
2002	4,306	—
2011	3,894	−9.6%
2021	3,546	−8.9%
Source: Census data
