= Gura Vadului =

- Commune
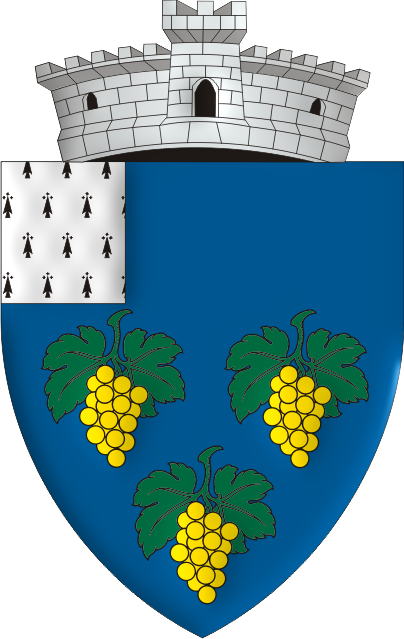
- Coat of arms

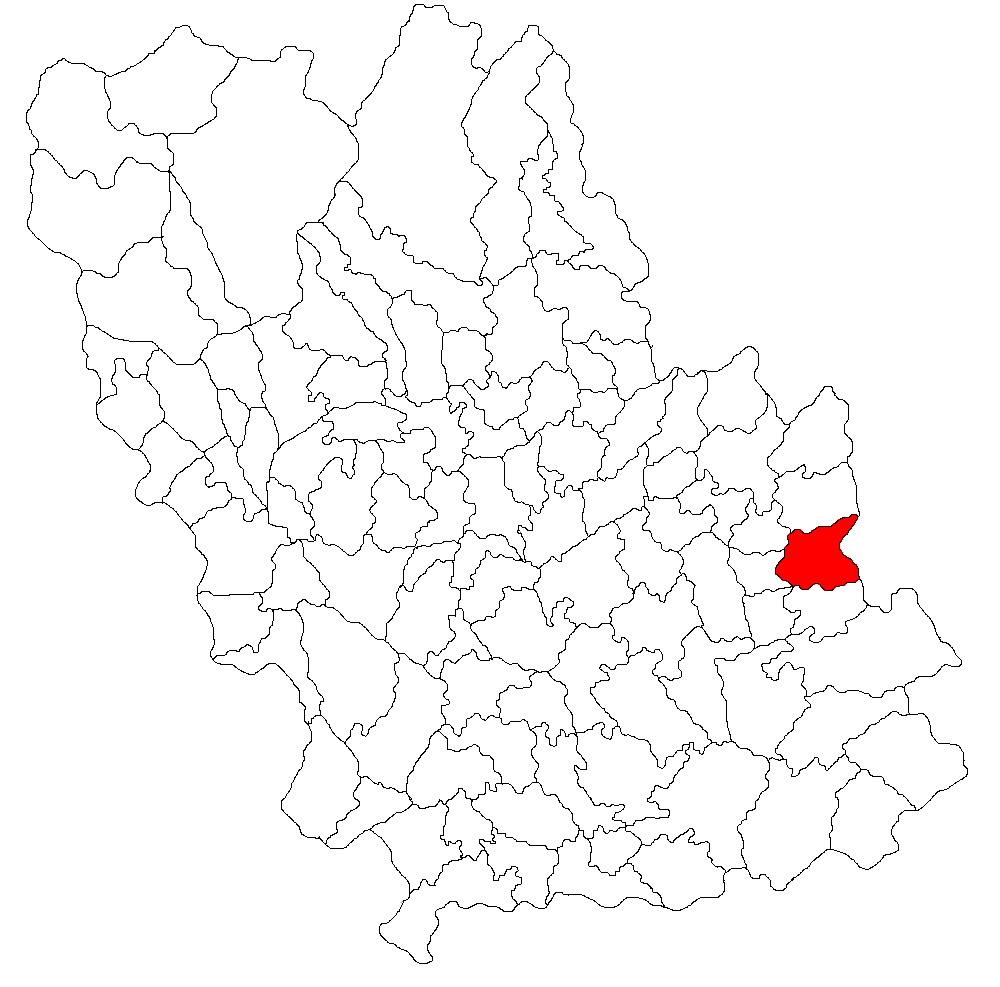
- Location in Prahova County

- Location in Romania
- Coordinates: 45°3′N 26°28′E
- Country: Romania
- County: Prahova

Government
  - Mayor (2024–2028): Nicolae Marius Sora (PNL)
- Area: 33.03 km^{2} (12.75 sq mi)
- Elevation: 158 m (518 ft)
- Population (2021-12-01): 1,979
  - Density: 60/km^{2} (160/sq mi)
- Time zone: EET/EEST (UTC+2/+3)
- Postal code: 107300
- Area code: +(40) 244
- Vehicle reg.: PH
- Website: www.comunaguravadului.ro

Gura Vadului is a commune in Prahova County, Muntenia, Romania. It is composed of three villages: Gura Vadului, Perșunari, and Tohani.

Historical population
Year	Pop.	±%
1992	2,673	—
2002	2,550	−4.6%
2011	2,285	−10.4%
2021	1,979	−13.4%
Source: Census data
