= Boldești-Grădiștea =

- Commune
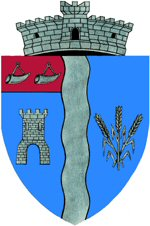
- Coat of arms

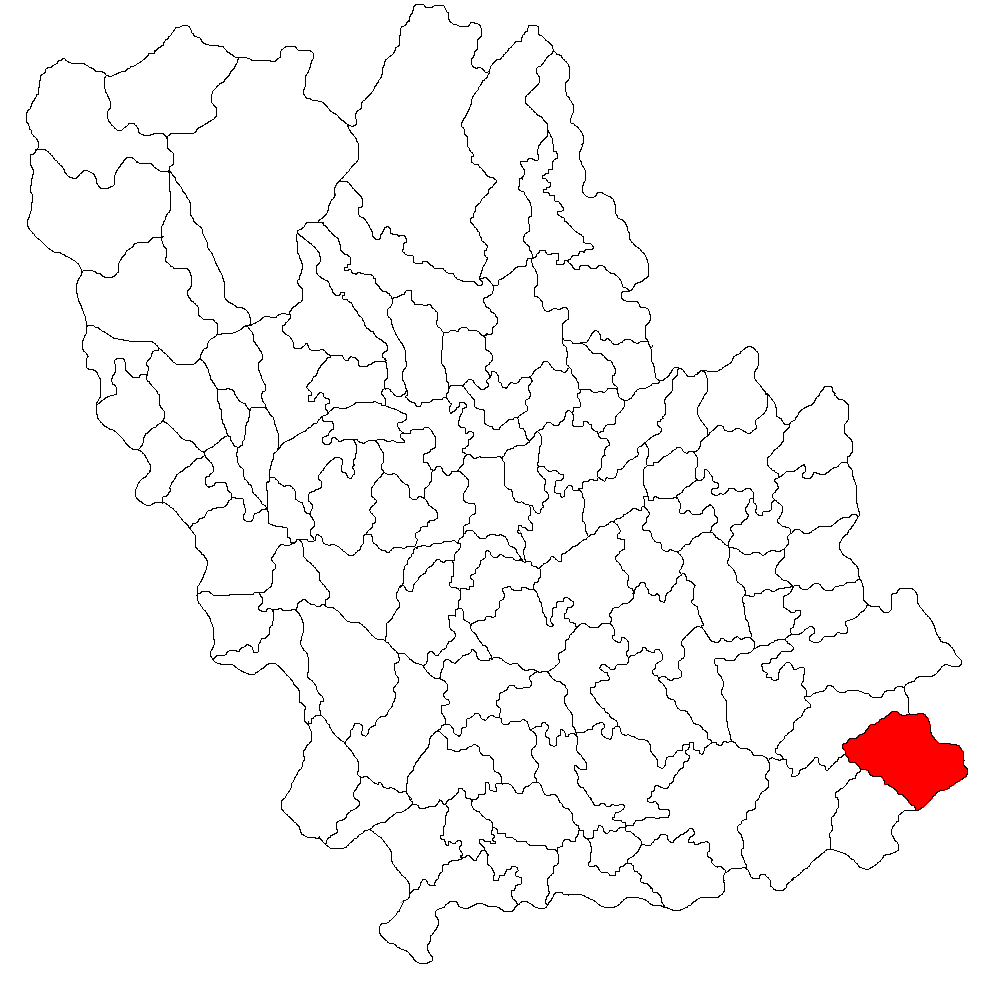
- Location in Prahova County

- Location in Romania
- Coordinates: 44°52′N 26°33′E
- Country: Romania
- County: Prahova

Government
  - Mayor (2024–2028): Leon Damian (ADU)
- Area: 39.47 km^{2} (15.24 sq mi)
- Elevation: 74 m (243 ft)
- Population (2021-12-01): 1,433
  - Density: 36/km^{2} (94/sq mi)
- Time zone: EET/EEST (UTC+2/+3)
- Postal code: 107075
- Area code: +(40) 244
- Vehicle reg.: PH
- Website: primariaboldestigradistea.ro

Boldești-Grădiștea is a commune in Prahova County, Muntenia, Romania. It is composed of two villages, Boldești and Gradiștea; the former is the administrative centre.

Historical population
Year	Pop.	±%
1992	2,163	—
2002	1,984	−8.3%
2011	1,817	−8.4%
2021	1,433	−21.1%
Source: Census data
