= Bertea (river) =

- Location within Romania

Location
- Country: Romania
- Counties: Prahova County
- Villages: Lutu Roșu, Bertea, Ostrovu

Physical characteristics
- Mouth: Aluniș
  - location: Ostrovu
  - coordinates: 45.1984°N 25.8960°E
- Length: 14 km (8.7 mi)
- Basin size: 36 km^{2} (14 sq mi)

Basin features
- Progression: Aluniș→ Vărbilău→ Teleajen→ Prahova→ Ialomița→ Danube→ Black Sea
- Tributaries
  - right: Călmâiasa

The Bertea is a left tributary of the river Aluniș in Romania. It flows into the Aluniș in the village Ostrovu. Its length is 14 km (8.7 mi) and its basin size is 36 km^{2} (14 sq mi).
