= Slănic (Vărbilău) =

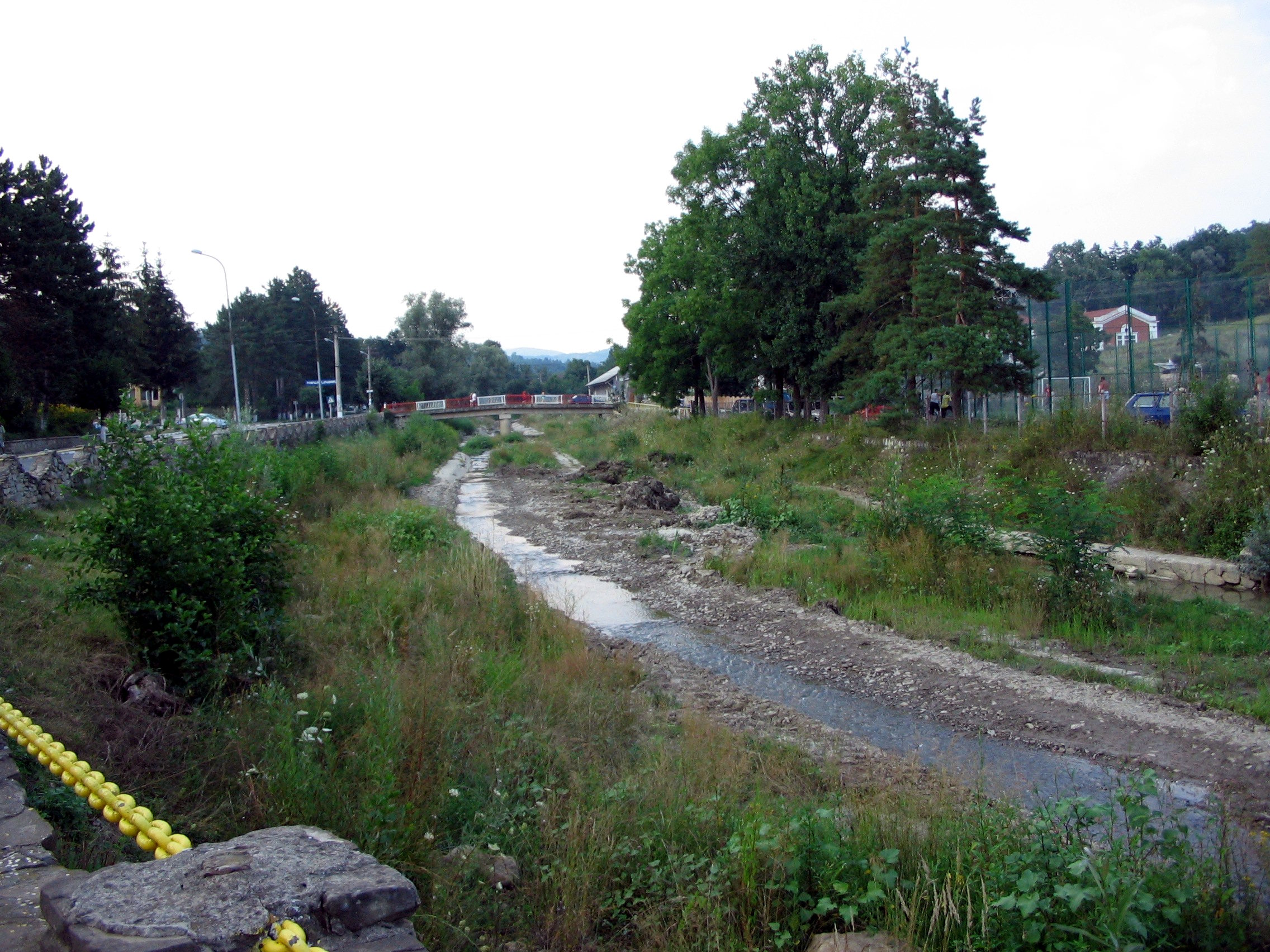
- Slănic river flowing through the town Slănic

- Location within Romania

Location
- Country: Romania
- Counties: Prahova County
- Villages: Groșani, Slănic, Prăjani, Vărbilău

Physical characteristics
- Mouth: Vărbilău
  - location: Vărbilău
  - coordinates: 45.1749°N 25.9717°E
- Length: 18 km (11 mi)
- Basin size: 44 km^{2} (17 sq mi)

Basin features
- Progression: Vărbilău→ Teleajen→ Prahova→ Ialomița→ Danube→ Black Sea

The Slănic is a left tributary of the river Vărbilău in Romania. It discharges into the Vărbilău in Vărbilău. Its length is 18 km (11 mi) and its basin size is 44 km^{2} (17 sq mi).
