= Ostrovu =

Ostrovu may refer to several villages in Romania:

- Ostrovu, a village in Valea Argovei Commune, Călăraşi County
- Ostrovu, a village in Aluniş Commune, Prahova County
