= Scurtești =

Scurteşti may refer to several villages in Romania:

- Scurteşti, a village in Vadu Pașii Commune, Buzău County
- Scurteşti, a village in Ștefești Commune, Prahova County
