= Vărbilău (river) =

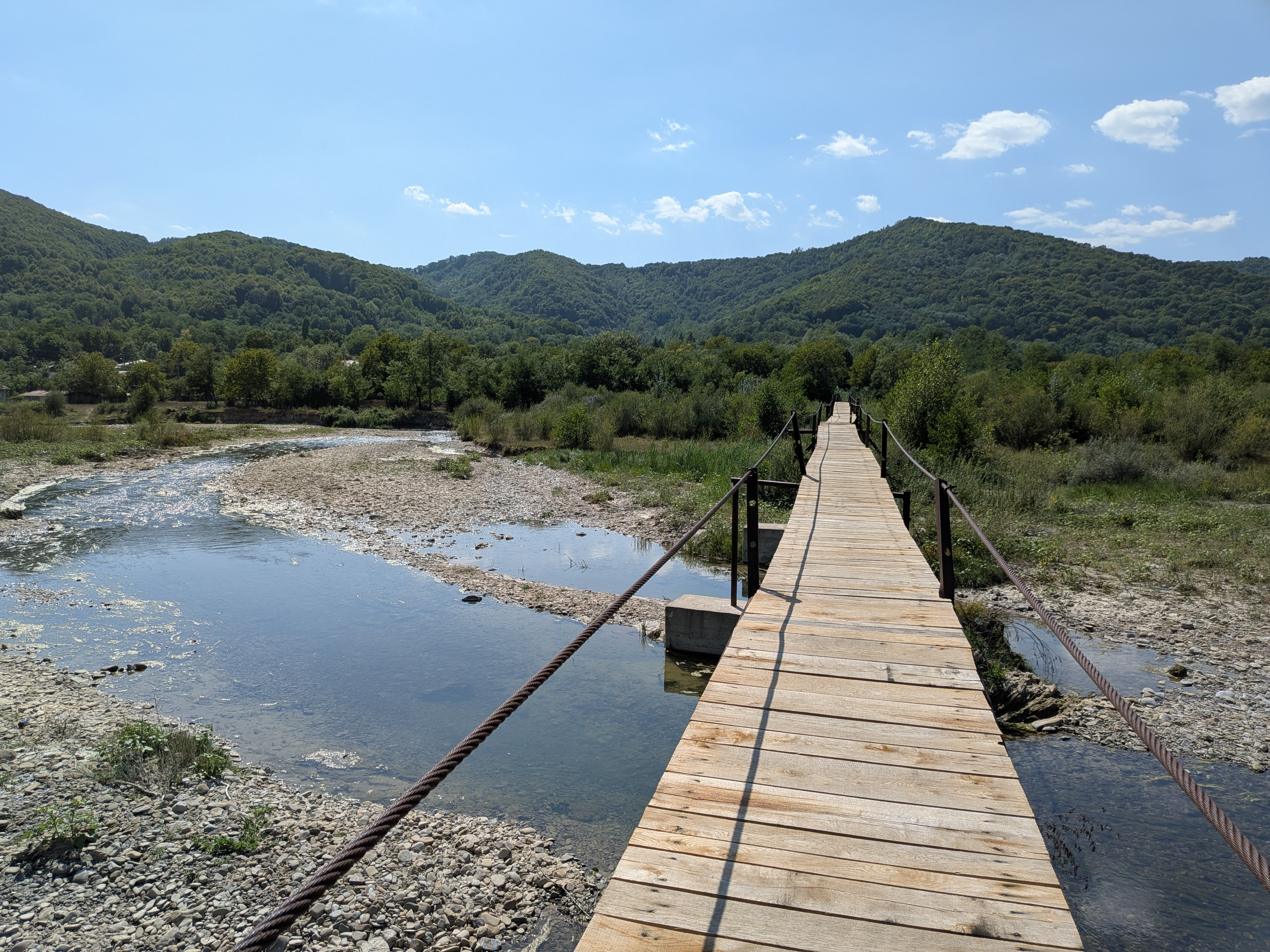

- Location within Romania

Location
- Country: Romania
- Counties: Prahova County

Physical characteristics
- Source: Grohotiș Mountains
- Mouth: Teleajen
  - location: Dumbrăvești
  - coordinates: 45.0779°N 26.0024°E
- Length: 37 km (23 mi)
- Basin size: 217 km^{2} (84 sq mi)

Basin features
- Progression: Teleajen→ Prahova→ Ialomița→ Danube→ Black Sea

The Vărbilău is a right tributary of the river Teleajen in Romania. It discharges into the Teleajen in Dumbrăvești. It flows through the villages Târșoreni, Scurtești, Ștefești, Aluniș, Livadea, Vărbilău, Poiana Vărbilău, Coțofenești and Dumbrăvești. Its length is 37 km (23 mi) and its basin size is 217 km^{2} (84 sq mi).

== Tributaries ==
The following rivers are tributaries to the river Vărbilău:

- Left: Vărsăturile, Valea Albă, Valea Seacă, Valea Pietrei, Valea Brădetului, Vulpea, Valea Poienii, Slănic
- Right: Valea Secărei, Aluniș
