= Aluniș (Vărbilău) =

- Location within Romania

Location
- Country: Romania
- Counties: Prahova County
- Villages: Aluniș

Physical characteristics
- Source: near Pietriceaua
- Mouth: Vărbilău
  - location: Ostrovu
  - coordinates: 45.1952°N 25.9012°E
- Length: 10 km (6.2 mi)
- Basin size: 63 km^{2} (24 sq mi)

Basin features
- Progression: Vărbilău→ Teleajen→ Prahova→ Ialomița→ Danube→ Black Sea
- Tributaries
  - left: Bertea

The Aluniș is a right tributary of the river Vărbilău in Romania. It flows into the Vărbilău in Ostrovu. Its length is 10 km (6.2 mi) and its basin size is 63 km^{2} (24 sq mi).
