= Vărbilău =

- Commune
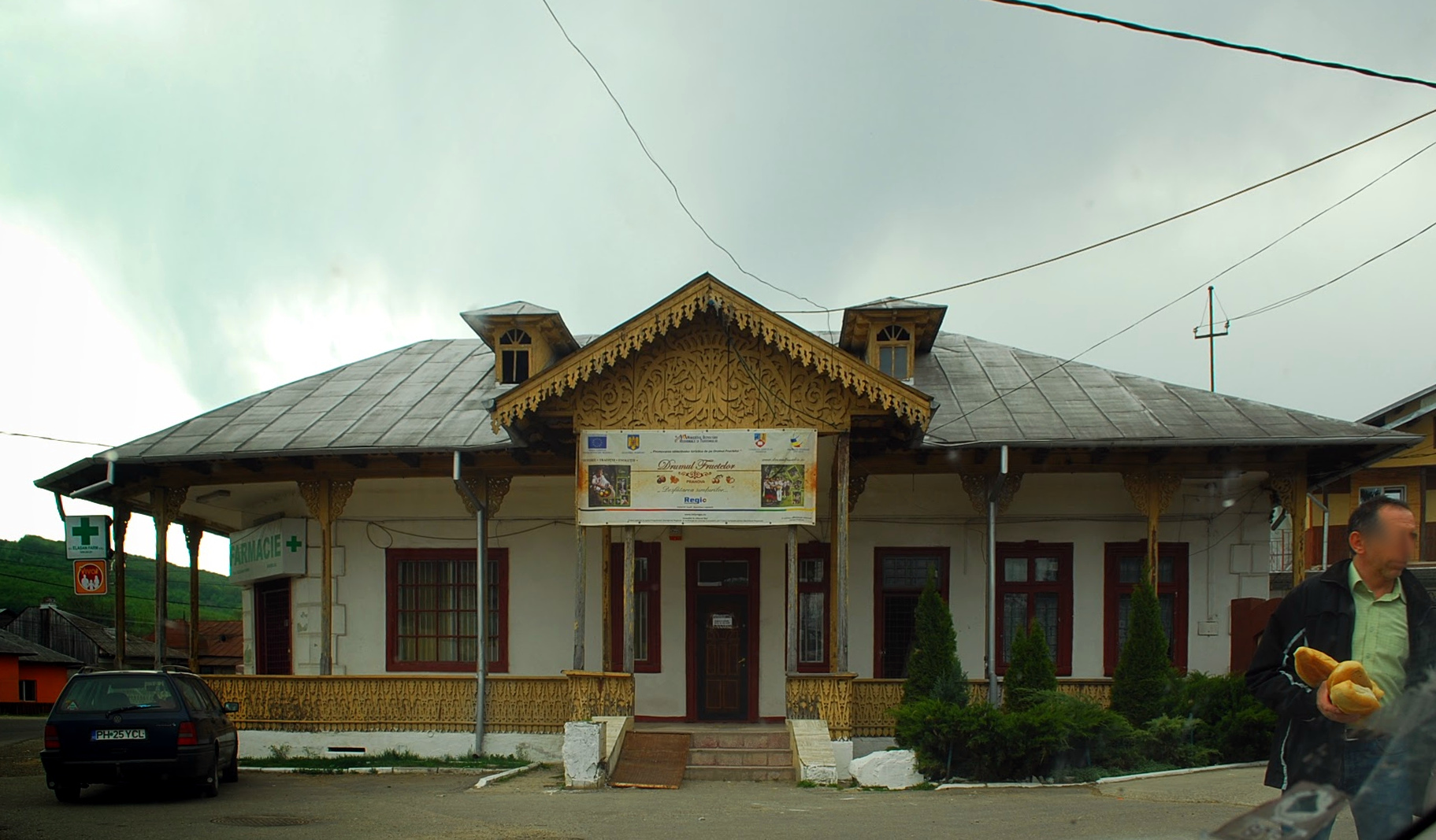
- Ion Filipescu house in Vărbilău

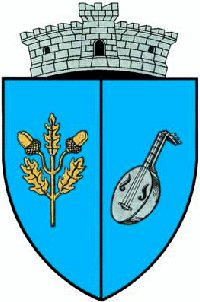
- Coat of arms

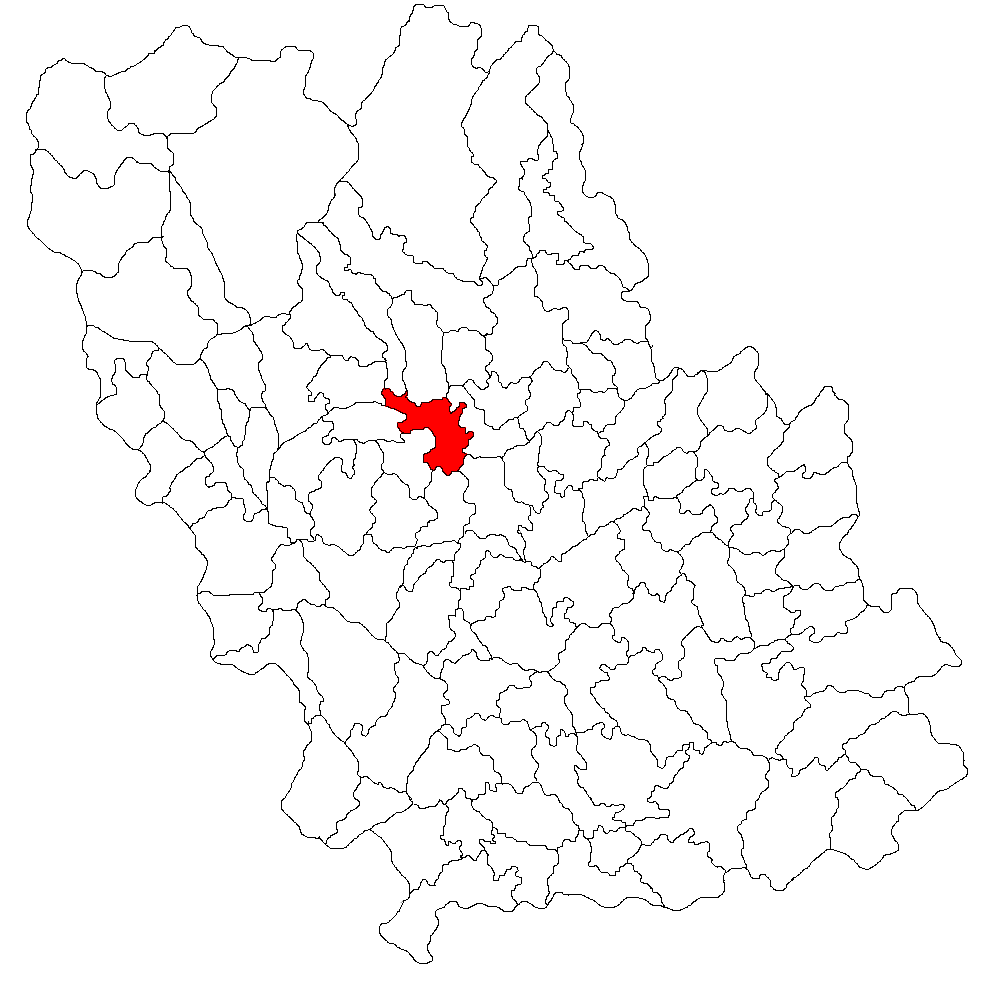
- Location in Prahova County

- Location in Romania
- Coordinates: 45°12′58″N 26°1′35″E
- Country: Romania
- County: Prahova

Government
  - Mayor (2024–2028): Mihail-Vasile Cărbunaru (PSD)
- Area: 42.06 km^{2} (16.24 sq mi)
- Elevation: 337 m (1,106 ft)
- Population (2021-12-01): 5,896
  - Density: 140.2/km^{2} (363.1/sq mi)
- Time zone: UTC+02:00 (EET)
  - Summer (DST): UTC+03:00 (EEST)
- Postal code: 107650
- Area code: +(40) 244
- Vehicle reg.: PH
- Website: primaria-varbilau.ro

Vărbilău is a commune in Prahova County, Muntenia, Romania. It is composed of five villages: Coțofenești, Livadea, Podu Ursului, Poiana Vărbilău, and Vărbilău.

== Geography ==
The commune is located in the central part of the county, 36 km (22 mi) north of the county seat, Ploiești. It lies on the banks of the Vărbilău River, in a hilly area at the foot of the Ciucaș Mountains.

== History ==
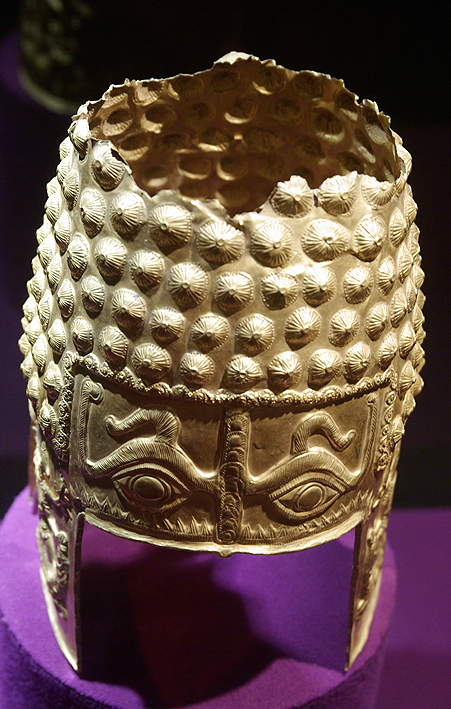
The Helmet of Coțofenești – a full electrum (a natreal gold-silver-copper alloy) Geto-Dacian helmet dating from around 400 BC, part of the inventory of the National Museum of Romanian History, stolen in 2025

A gold ceremonial helmet (5th century BC) was discovered at Coțofenești in c. 1929. Additional research was done by archaeologist Ioan Andrieșescu short after the finding. The helmet was kept at the National History Museum of Romania since 1970 and was stolen in January 2025 during a temporary exhibit in the Netherlands. It was recovered in April 2026.

Historical population
Year	Pop.	±%
1992	7,277	—
2002	7,208	−0.9%
2011	6,644	−7.8%
2021	5,896	−11.3%
Source: Census data

== People ==
- Gabi Luncă (1938–2021), Romanian-Romani lăutar musician
- Ely Culbertson (1891–1955), American contract bridge entrepreneur and personality
