= Ștefești =

- Commune
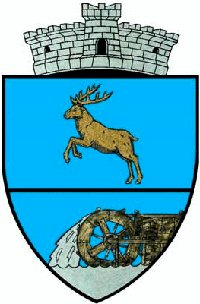
- Coat of arms

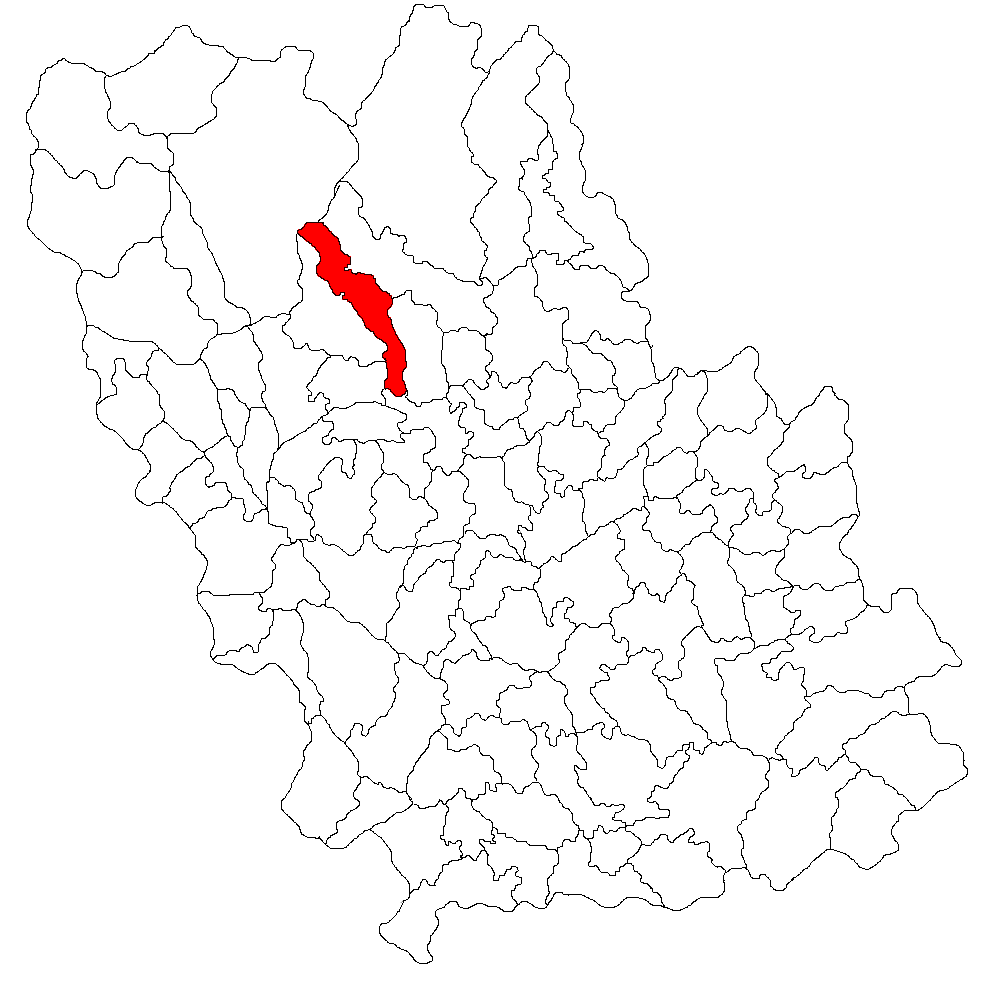
- Location in Prahova County

- Location in Romania
- Coordinates: 45°13′N 25°54′E
- Country: Romania
- County: Prahova

Government
  - Mayor (2020–2024): Vasile Tăbăraș (PSD)
- Area: 44.58 km^{2} (17.21 sq mi)
- Elevation: 462 m (1,516 ft)
- Population (2021-12-01): 1,929
  - Density: 43/km^{2} (110/sq mi)
- Time zone: EET/EEST (UTC+2/+3)
- Postal code: 107575
- Area code: +(40) 244
- Vehicle reg.: PH
- Website: primariastefesti.ro

Ștefești is a commune in Prahova County, Muntenia, Romania. It is composed of three villages: Scurtești, Ștefești, and Târșoreni.

Historical population
Year	Pop.	±%
2002	2,407	—
2011	2,137	−11.2%
2021	1,929	−9.7%
Source: Census data
