= Aluniș, Prahova =

Aluniș
- Commune
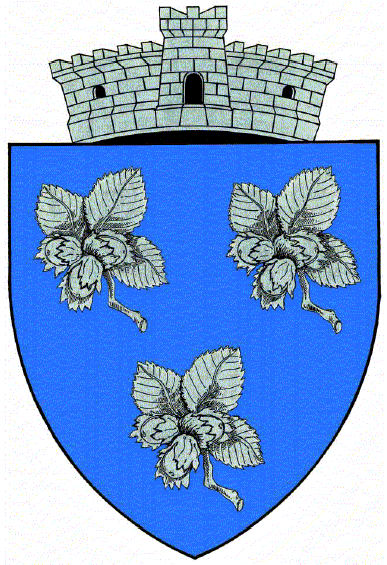
- Coat of arms

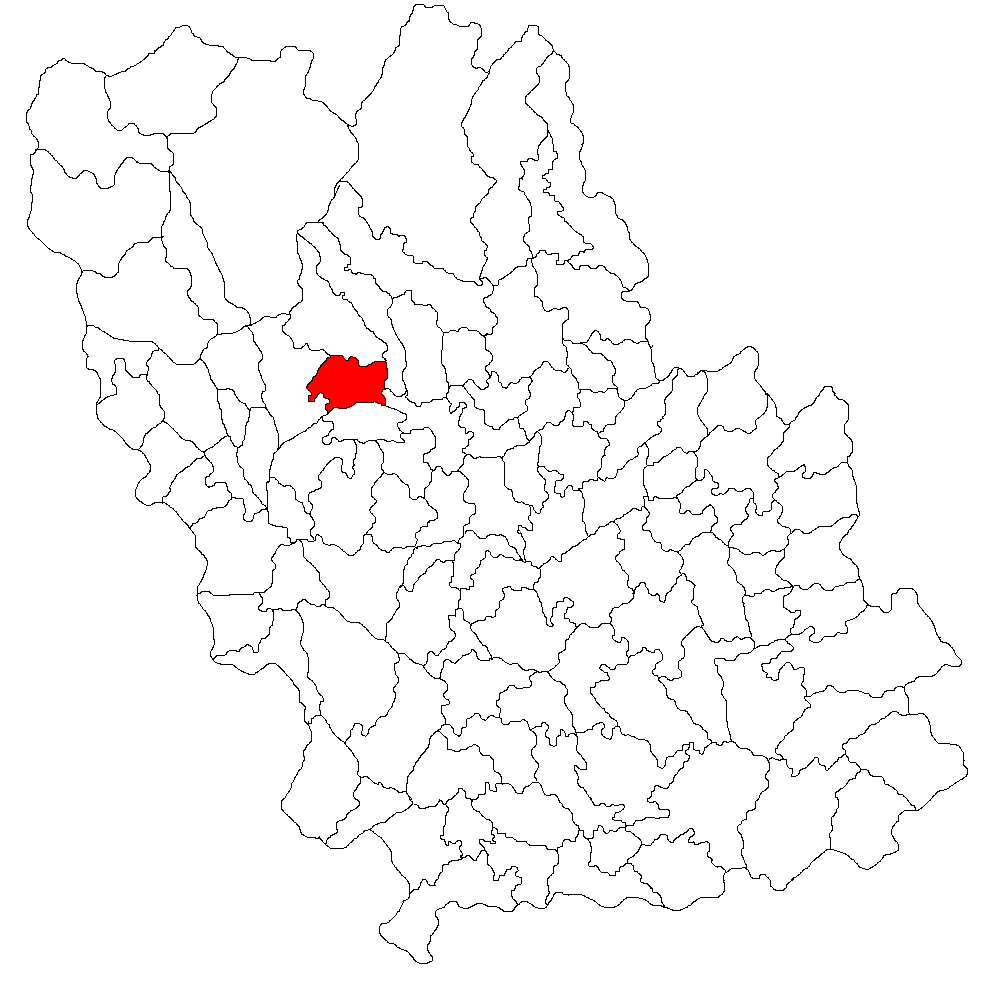
- Location in Prahova County

- Location in Romania
- Coordinates: 45°12′N 25°52′E
- Country: Romania
- County: Prahova

Government
  - Mayor (2024–2028): Iulian Cristian Bîgiu (PSD)
- Area: 26.78 km^{2} (10.34 sq mi)
- Elevation: 413 m (1,355 ft)
- Population (2021-12-01): 3,351
  - Density: 130/km^{2} (320/sq mi)
- Time zone: EET/EEST (UTC+2/+3)
- Postal code: 107015
- Area code: +(40) 244
- Vehicle reg.: PH
- Website: www.primariaalunis.ro

Aluniș is a commune in Prahova County, Muntenia, Romania. It is composed of two villages, Aluniș and Ostrovu.

The commune is located in the central part of the county, 18 km (11 mi) northeast of Câmpina and 43 km (27 mi) north of the county seat, Ploiești. It lies on the banks of the Aluniș River, in a hilly area at the foot of the Grohotiș Mountains.

Historical population
Year	Pop.	±%
1992	3,939	—
2002	3,749	−4.8%
2011	3,661	−2.3%
2021	3,351	−8.5%
Source: Census data
