= List of settlements in Buzău County =

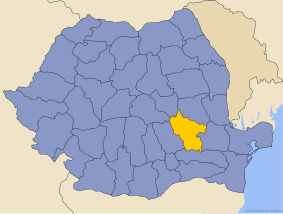
Buzău County in Romania

This is a list of settlements in Buzău County, Romania.

The following are the county's cities and towns, along with their attached villages:

City/Town	Villages
Buzău	
Râmnicu Sărat	
Nehoiu	Bâsca Rozilei, Chirlești, Curmătura, Lunca Priporului, Mlăjet, Nehoiașu, Păltineni, Stănila, Vinețișu
Pătârlagele	Calea Chiojdului, Crâng, Fundăturile, Gornet, Lunca, Mănăstirea, Mărunțișu, Mușcel, Poienile, Sibiciu de Sus, Stroești, Valea Lupului, Valea Sibiciului, Valea Viei
Pogoanele	Căldărăști

The following are the county's communes, with component villages:

Commune	Villages
Amaru	Amaru, Câmpeni, Dulbanu, Lacu Sinaia, Lunca, Scorțeanca
Bălăceanu	Bălăceanu
Balta Albă	Amara, Balta Albă, Băile, Stăvărăști
Beceni	Arbănași, Beceni, Cărpiniștea, Dogari, Florești, Gura Dimienii, Izvoru Dulce, Mărgăriți, Valea Părului
Berca	Băceni, Berca, Cojanu, Joseni, Mânăstirea Rătești, Pâclele, Pleșcoi, Pleșești, Rătești, Sătuc, Tâțârligu, Valea Nucului, Viforâta
Bisoca	Băltăgari, Bisoca, Lacurile, Lopătăreasa, Pleși, Recea, Sările, Șindrila
Blăjani	Blăjani, Sorești
Boldu	Boldu
Bozioru	Bozioru, Buduile, Fișici, Găvanele, Gresia, Izvoarele, Nucu, Scăeni, Ulmet, Văvălucile
Brădeanu	Brădeanu, Mitropolia, Smârdan
Brăești	Brăești, Brătilești, Goidești, Ivănețu, Pinu, Pârscovelu, Ruginoasa
Breaza	Breaza, Bădeni, Greceanca, Văleanca-Vilănești, Vispești
Buda	Alexandru Odobescu, Buda, Dănulești, Mucești-Dănulești, Spidele, Toropălești, Valea Largă
C. A. Rosetti	Bălteni, Bâlhacu, C.A. Rosetti, Cotu Ciorii, Lunca, Vizireni
Calvini	Calvini, Bâscenii de Jos, Bâscenii de Sus, Frăsinet, Olari
Cănești	Cănești, Gonțești, Negoșina, Păcurile, Șuchea, Valea Verzei
Cătina	Cătina, Corbu, Slobozia, Valea Cătinei, Zeletin
Cernătești	Aldeni, Băești, Căldărușa, Cernătești, Fulga, Manasia, Vlădeni, Zărneștii de Slănic
Chiliile	Budești, Chiliile, Crevelești, Ghiocari, Glodu-Petcari, Poiana Pletari, Trestioara
Chiojdu	Bâsca Chiojdului, Cătiașu, Chiojdu, Lera, Plescioara, Poenițele
Cilibia	Cilibia, Gara Cilibia, Mânzu, Movila Oii, Poșta
Cislău	Bărăști, Buda Crăciunești, Cislău, Gura Bâscei, Scărișoara
Cochirleanca	Boboc, Cochirleanca, Gara Bobocu, Roșioru, Târlele
Colți	Aluniș, Colți, Colții de Jos, Muscelu Cărămănești
Costești	Budișteni, Costești, Gomoești, Groșani, Pietrosu, Spătaru
Cozieni	Anini, Bălănești, Bercești, Ciocănești, Cocârceni, Colțeni, Cozieni, Fața lui Nan, Glodurile, Izvoru, Lungești, Nistorești, Pietraru, Punga, Teișu, Trestia, Tulburea, Valea Banului, Valea Roatei, Zăpodia
Florica	Florica
Gălbinași	Bentu, Gălbinași, Tăbărăști
Gherăseni	Gherăseni, Sudiți
Ghergheasa	Ghergheasa, Sălcioara
Glodeanu Sărat	Căldărușanca, Glodeanu Sărat, Ileana, Pitulicea
Glodeanu-Siliștea	Casota, Cârligu Mare, Cârligu Mic, Corbu, Cotorca, Glodeanu-Siliștea, Satu Nou, Văcăreasca
Grebănu	Grebănu, Homești, Livada, Livada Mică, Plevna, Zăplazi
Gura Teghii	Furtunești, Gura Teghii, Nemertea, Păltiniș, Secuiu, Varlaam, Vadu Oii
Largu	Largu, Scărlătești
Lopătari	Brebu, Fundata, Lopătari, Luncile, Pestrițu, Plaiu Nucului, Ploștina, Potecu, Săreni, Terca, Vârteju
Luciu	Caragele, Luciu
Măgura	Ciuta, Măgura
Mânzălești	Beșlii, Buștea, Cireșu, Ghizdita, Gura Bădicului, Jghiab, Mânzălești, Plavățu, Poiana Vâlcului, Satu Vechi, Trestioara, Valea Cotoarei, Valea Ursului
Mărăcineni	Căpățânești, Mărăcineni, Potoceni
Mărgăritești	Câmpulungeanca, Fântânele, Mărgăritești
Merei	Ciobănoaia, Dealul Viei, Dobrilești, Gura Sărății, Izvoru Dulce, Lipia, Merei, Nenciulești, Ogrăzile, Sărata-Monteoru, Valea Puțului Merei
Mihăilești	Colțăneni, Mărgineanu, Mihăilești, Satu Nou
Movila Banului	Cioranca, Limpeziș, Movila Banului
Murgești	Batogu, Murgești, Valea Ratei
Năeni	Fântânele, Fințești, Năeni, Proșca, Vârf
Odăile	Capu Satului, Corneanu, Gorâni, Lacu, Odăile, Piatra Albă, Posobești, Scoroșești, Valea Fântânei, Valea Ștefanului
Padina	Padina
Pănătău	Begu, Lacu cu Anini, Măguricea, Pănătău, Plăișor, Râpile, Sibiciu de Jos, Tega, Zaharești
Pardoși	Chiperu, Costomiru, Pardoși, Valea lui Lalu, Valea Șchiopului
Pârscov	Bădila, Curcănești, Lunca Frumoasă, Oleșești, Pârjolești, Pârscov, Robești, Runcu, Târcov, Tocileni, Trestieni, Valea Purcarului
Pietroasele	Câlțești, Clondiru de Sus, Dara, Pietroasa Mică, Pietroasele, Șarânga
Podgoria	Coțatcu, Oratia, Pleșești, Podgoria, Tăbăcari
Poșta Câlnău	Aliceni, Sudiți, Coconari, Poșta Câlnău, Potârnichești, Zilișteanca
Puiești	Dăscălești, Lunca, Măcrina, Nicolești, Plopi, Puieștii de Jos, Puieștii de Sus
Racovițeni	Budrea, Petrișoru, Racovițeni
Râmnicelu	Colibași, Fotin, Râmnicelu, Știubei
Robeasca	Moșești, Robeasca
Rușețu	Rușețu, Sergent Ionel Ștefan
Săgeata	Banița, Beilic, Bordușani, Dâmbroca, Găvănești, Movilița, Săgeata
Săhăteni	Găgeni, Istrița de Jos, Săhăteni, Vintileanca
Săpoca	Mătești, Săpoca
Sărulești	Cărătnău de Jos, Cărătnău de Sus, Goicelu, Sările-Cătun, Sărulești, Valea Largă-Sărulești, Valea Stânei
Scorțoasa	Balta Tocila, Beciu, Dâlma, Deleni, Golu Grabicina, Grabicina de Jos, Grabicina de Sus, Gura Văii, Plopeasa, Policiori, Scorțoasa
Scutelnici	Arcanu, Brăgăreasa, Lipănescu, Scutelnici
Siriu	Cașoca, Colțu Pietrii, Gura Siriului, Lunca Jariștei, Mușcelușa.
Smeeni	Albești, Bălaia, Călțuna, Moisica, Smeeni, Udați-Lucieni, Udați-Mânzu.
Stâlpu	Stâlpu
Tisău	Bărbuncești, Grăjdana, Haleș, Izvoranu, Izvoru, Leiculești, Pădurenii, Salcia, Strezeni, Tisău, Valea Sălciilor
Topliceni	Băbeni, Ceairu, Dedulești, Gura Făgetului, Poșta, Răducești, Topliceni
Țintești	Maxenu, Odaia Banului, Pogonele, Țintești
Ulmeni	Băltăreți, Clondiru, Sărata, Ulmeni, Vâlcele
Unguriu	Ojasca, Unguriu
Vadu Pașii	Băjani, Focșănei, Gura Câlnăului, Scurtești, Stăncești, Vadu Pașii
Valea Râmnicului	Oreavu, Rubla, Valea Râmnicului
Valea Salciei	Modreni, Valea Salciei, Valea Salciei-Cătun
Vâlcelele	Vâlcelele
Vernești	Brădeanca, Cândești, Cârlomănești, Mierea, Nenciu, Nișcov, Săsenii Noi, Săsenii pe Vale, Săsenii Vechi, Vernești, Zorești
Vintilă Vodă	Bodinești, Coca-Antimirești, Coca-Niculești, Niculești, Petrăchești, Podu Muncii, Sârbești, Smeești, Vintilă Vodă
Viperești	Muscel, Pălici, Rușavăț, Tronari, Ursoaia, Viperești
Zărnești	Comisoaia, Fundeni, Pruneni, Vadu Sorești, Zărnești
Ziduri	Costieni, Cuculeasa, Heliade Rădulescu, Lanurile, Ziduri, Zoița
