= Glodeanu =

Glodeanu may refer to one of two communes in Buzău County, Romania:

- Glodeanu Sărat
- Glodeanu-Siliștea
