= Căpățânești =

Căpăţâneşti may refer to several places in Romania:

- Căpăţâneşti, a village in Mărăcineni Commune, Buzău County
- Căpăţâneşti, a village in Broşteni Commune, Mehedinţi County

== See also ==
- Căpățâneni, a village in Argeș County, Romania
