= Gălbinași =

Gălbinași may refer to several places in Romania:

- Gălbinași, Buzău, a commune in Buzău County
- Gălbinași, Călărași, a commune in Călărași County
