= Amaru, Buzău =

Amaru
- Commune
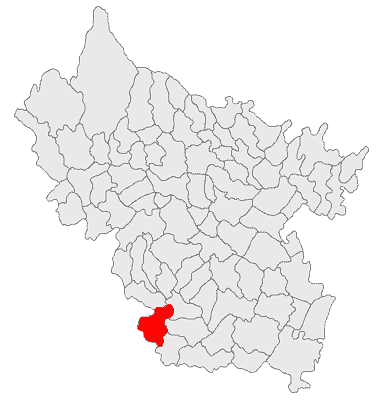
- Location in Buzău County

- Location in Romania
- Coordinates: 44°55′40″N 26°35′20″E
- Country: Romania
- County: Buzău
- Subdivisions: Amaru, Câmpeni, Dulbanu, Lunca, Scorțeanca, Lacu Sinaia

Government
  - Mayor (2020–2024): Constantin Croitoru (PSD)
- Area: 67.78 km^{2} (26.17 sq mi)
- Elevation: 77 m (253 ft)
- Population (2021-12-01): 2,090
  - Density: 30.8/km^{2} (79.9/sq mi)
- Time zone: UTC+02:00 (EET)
  - Summer (DST): UTC+03:00 (EEST)
- Postal code: 127005
- Area code: +(40) 238
- Vehicle reg.: BZ
- Website: www.primariaamaru.ro

Amaru is a commune in Buzău County, Muntenia, Romania. It is composed of six villages: Amaru, Câmpeni, Dulbanu, Lacu Sinaia, Lunca, and Scorțeanca.

The commune is situated in the Wallachian Plain, at an altitude of 77 m (253 ft). It is located in the southern part of Buzău County, 33 km (21 mi) southwest of the county seat, Buzău, on the border with Prahova County. Amaru is crossed by county road DJ102H, which connects it to Mizil, 15 km (9.3 mi) to the northwest, and to Căldărușanca, 10 km (6.2 mi) to the southeast, where it meets national road DN2.

Historical population
Year	Pop.	±%
2002	2,773	—
2011	2,640	−4.8%
2021	2,090	−20.8%
Source: Census data

== Natives ==
- Ion Mocanu (born 1962), handball player and coach
