= Mărăcineni, Buzău =

Mărăcineni
- Commune
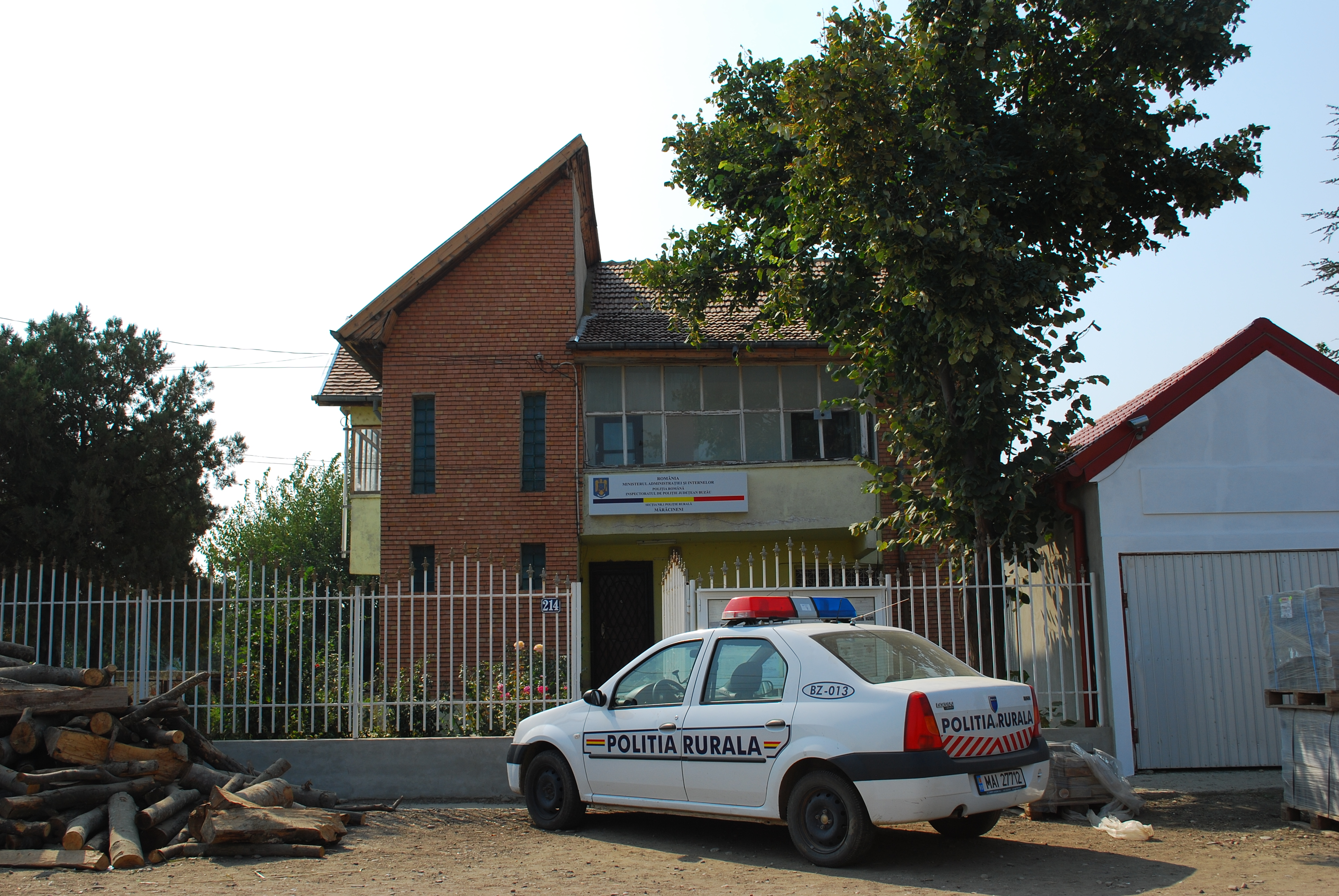
- Albanopol mansion in Mărăcineni

- Coat of arms

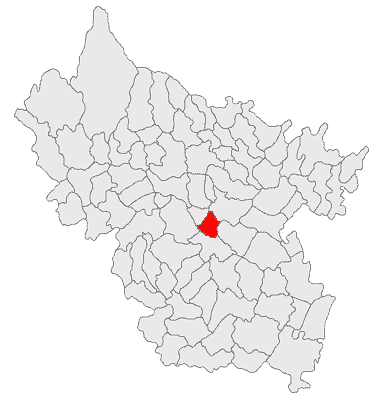
- Location in Buzău County

- Location in Romania
- Coordinates: 45°12′N 26°48′E
- Country: Romania
- County: Buzău
- Subdivisions: Căpățânești, Mărăcineni, Potoceni

Government
  - Mayor (2020–2024): Dumitru Constantin (PSD)
- Area: 29.47 km^{2} (11.38 sq mi)
- Elevation: 100 m (330 ft)
- Population (2021-12-01): 9,653
  - Density: 327.6/km^{2} (848.4/sq mi)
- Time zone: UTC+02:00 (EET)
  - Summer (DST): UTC+03:00 (EEST)
- Postal code: 127320
- Area code: +(40) 238
- Vehicle reg.: BZ
- Website: primariamaracineni.ro

Mărăcineni (Romanian pronunciation: [mərət͡ʃiˈnenʲ]) is a commune in the center of Buzău County, Muntenia, Romania, just north of Buzău, the county seat. The commune is made up of three villages: Mărăcineni, Căpățânești, and Potoceni.

== Location ==
Mărăcineni lies on the left bank of the Buzău River, at its exit from between the Subcarpathian Hills, only 1 km north from the city of Buzău, located on the opposite bank of the river. Mărăcineni is connected to the city via the DN2 national road, across a bridge, known as either the Buzău bridge or the Mărăcineni bridge, which is the most important road connection between Bucharest and the cities of Moldavia. This bridge was damaged by floods during the summer of 2005, and was demolished and rebuilt by November of the same year.

== Neighbours ==
- The commune of Săpoca, to the north-west
- The commune of Poșta Câlnău, to the north-east
- The commune of Vernești, to the south-west
- The municipality of Buzău, to the south

== Politics ==
The mayor of the commune is Dumitru Constantin, from the Social Democratic Party. The Mărăcineni Local Council, elected in the 2004 local government elections, was made up of 13 councillors, with the following party composition:

Party	Seats	Current Council
Justice and Truth Alliance	6	
Social Democratic Party	5	
Conservative Party	1	
Greater Romania Party	1	

== History ==
The first document mentioning the village of Mărăcineni is a property act of November 3, 1597, by which the prince of Wallachia, Mihai Viteazul acknowledges the ownership of Fătu of Mărăcineni over a vineyard which he had recently bought.

Between 1960 and 1968, the commune was a suburb of Buzău.

== International relations ==
Mărăcineni signed a cooperation agreement with Sèvres, France, in 1991.

Historical population
Year	Pop.	±%
2002	7,202	—
2011	8,279	+15.0%
2021	9,653	+16.6%
Source: Census data

== Notes ==
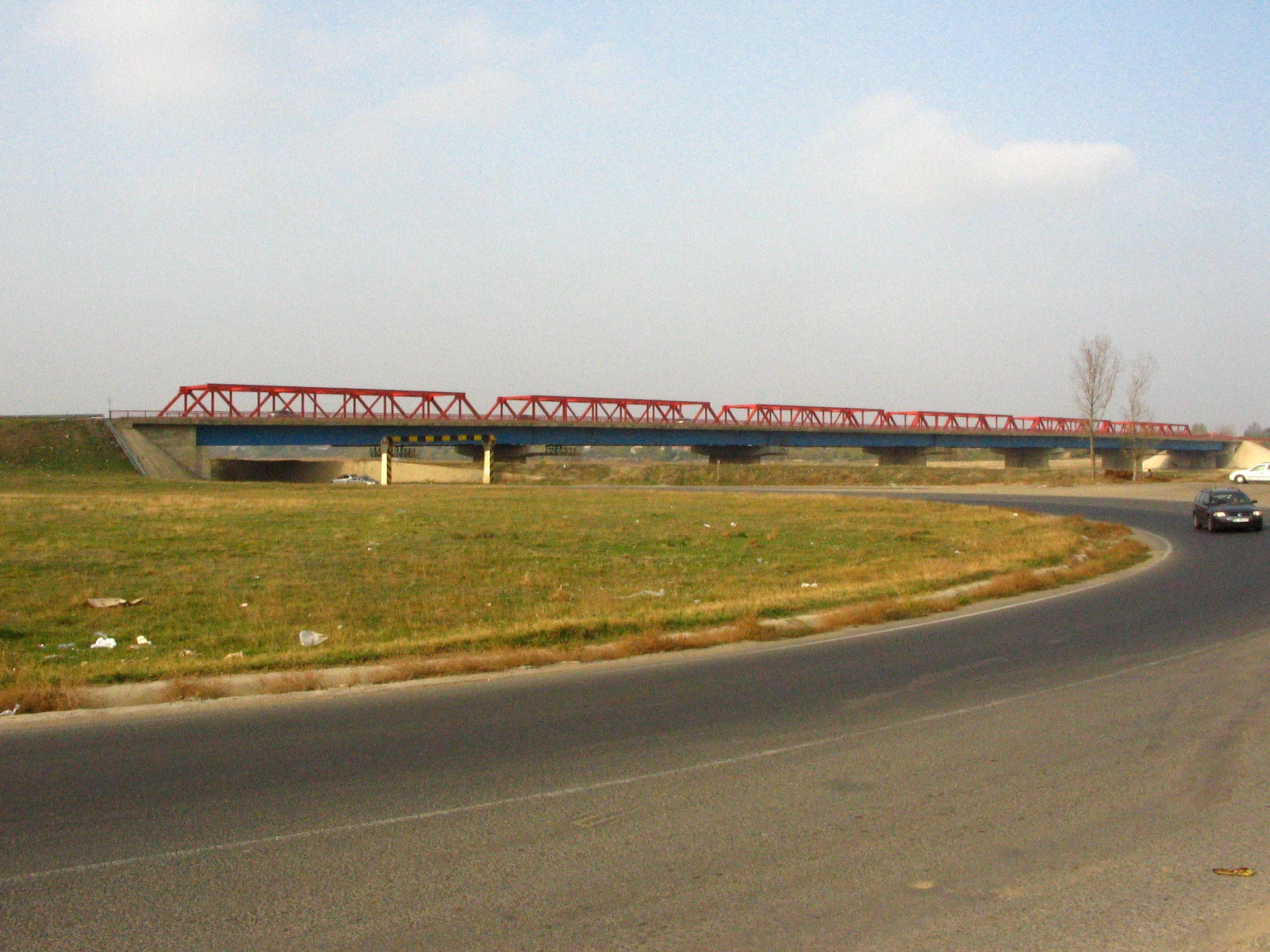
The Mărăcineni Bridge, over the Buzău River
