= Chiliile =

- Commune
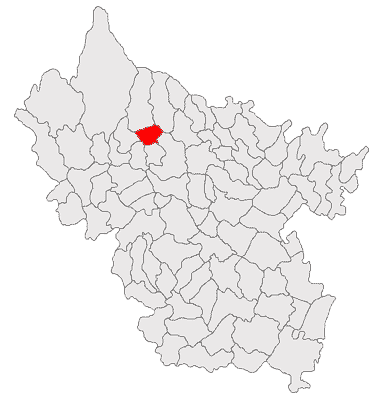
- Location in Buzău County

- Location in Romania
- Coordinates: 45°27′N 26°35′E
- Country: Romania
- County: Buzău
- Subdivisions: Budești, Chiliile, Crevelești, Ghiocari, Glodu-Petcari, Poiana Pletari, Trestioara

Government
  - Mayor (2020–2024): Valentin Sorin Zaman (PSD)
- Area: 35.66 km^{2} (13.77 sq mi)
- Elevation: 400 m (1,300 ft)
- Population (2021-12-01): 506
  - Density: 14/km^{2} (37/sq mi)
- Time zone: EET/EEST (UTC+2/+3)
- Postal code: 127160
- Area code: +(40) 238
- Vehicle reg.: BZ
- Website: www.primariachiliile.ro

Chiliile is a commune in Buzău County, Muntenia, Romania. It is composed of seven villages: Budești, Chiliile, Crevelești, Ghiocari, Glodu-Petcari, Poiana Pletari, and Trestioara.

Historical population
Year	Pop.	±%
2002	779	—
2011	623	−20.0%
2021	506	−18.8%
Source: Census data
