= Ulmeni, Buzău =

Ulmeni
- Commune
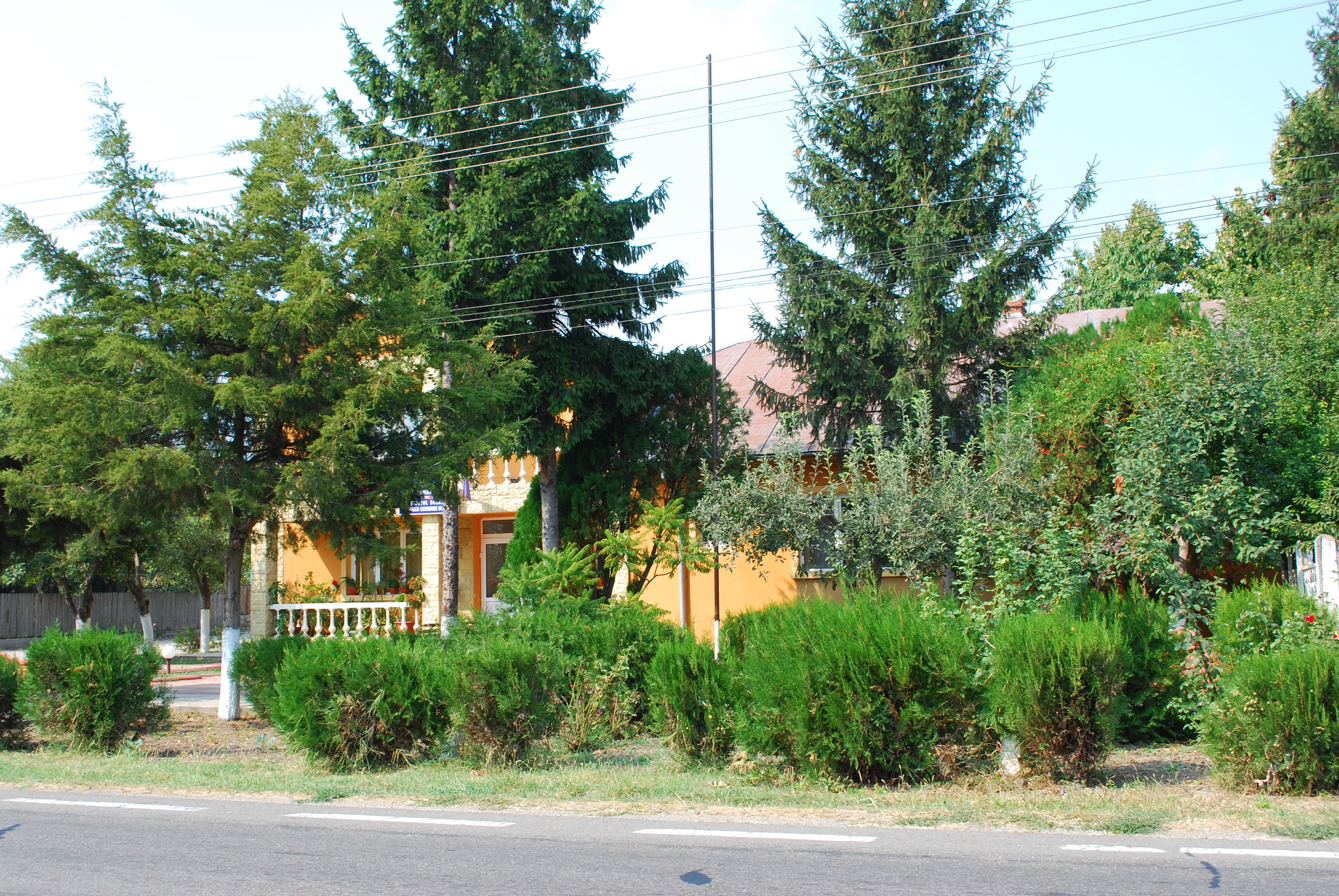
- Ulmeni town hall

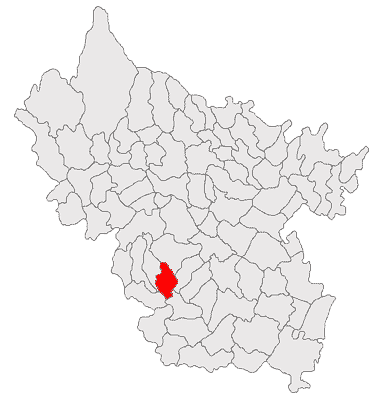
- Location in Buzău County

- Location in Romania
- Coordinates: 45°5′N 26°38′E
- Country: Romania
- County: Buzău
- Subdivisions: Băltăreți, Clondiru, Sărata, Ulmeni, Vâlcele

Government
  - Mayor (2020–2024): Valeriu Armeanu (PSD)
- Area: 36.54 km^{2} (14.11 sq mi)
- Elevation: 115 m (377 ft)
- Population (2021-12-01): 3,146
  - Density: 86.10/km^{2} (223.0/sq mi)
- Time zone: UTC+02:00 (EET)
  - Summer (DST): UTC+03:00 (EEST)
- Postal code: 127645
- Area code: +(40) 238
- Vehicle reg.: BZ
- Website: primariaulmenibuzau.ro

Ulmeni is a commune in Buzău County, Muntenia, Romania. It is composed of five villages: Băltăreți, Clondiru, Sărata, Ulmeni, and Vâlcele.

Historical population
Year	Pop.	±%
2002	3,330	—
2011	3,199	−3.9%
2021	3,146	−1.7%
Source: Census data

== Natives ==
- Grigore Niculescu-Buzești (1908–1949), politician who served as the Minister of Foreign Affairs of Romania in 1944
