= Cilibia, Buzău =

Cilibia
- Commune
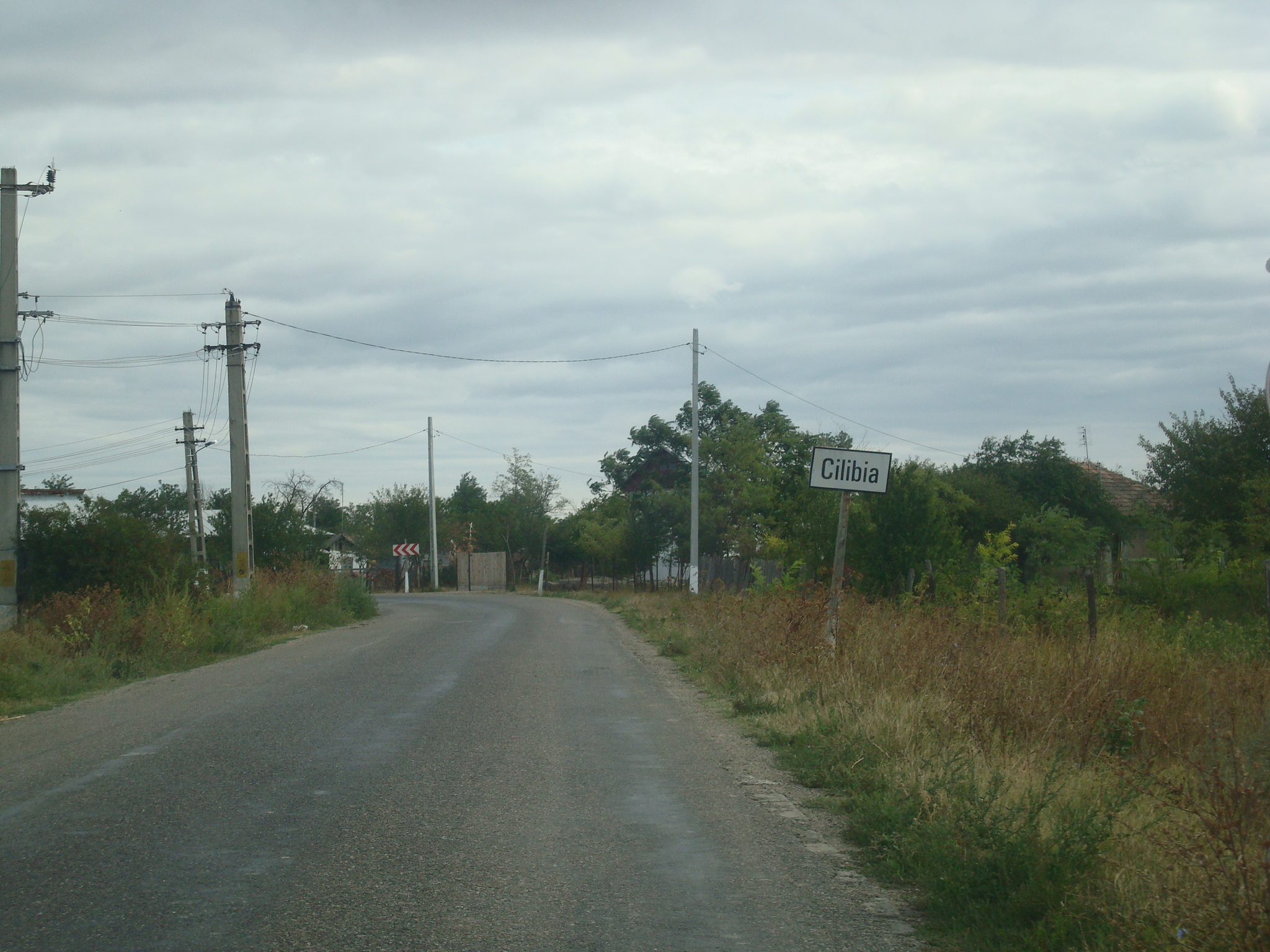
- Entrance to Cilibia Commune

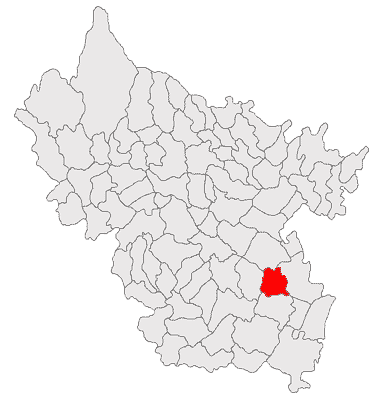
- Location in Buzău County

- Location in Romania
- Coordinates: 45°4′N 27°4′E
- Country: Romania
- County: Buzău
- Subdivisions: Cilibia, Gara Cilibia, Mânzu, Movila Oii, Poșta

Government
  - Mayor (2024–2028): Ioana Toma (PNL)
- Area: 49.41 km^{2} (19.08 sq mi)
- Elevation: 58 m (190 ft)
- Population (2021-12-01): 1,639
  - Density: 33.17/km^{2} (85.91/sq mi)
- Time zone: UTC+02:00 (EET)
  - Summer (DST): UTC+03:00 (EEST)
- Postal code: 127180
- Area code: +(40) 238
- Vehicle reg.: BZ
- Website: comunacilibia.ro

Cilibia is a commune in Buzău County, Muntenia, Romania. It is composed of five villages: Cilibia, Gara Cilibia, Mânzu, Movila Oii, and Poșta.

Historical population
| Year | Pop. | ±% |
|---|---|---|
| 2002 | 1,940 | — |
| 2011 | 1,864 | −3.9% |
| 2021 | 1,639 | −12.1% |
Source: Census data
