= Boldu =

- Commune
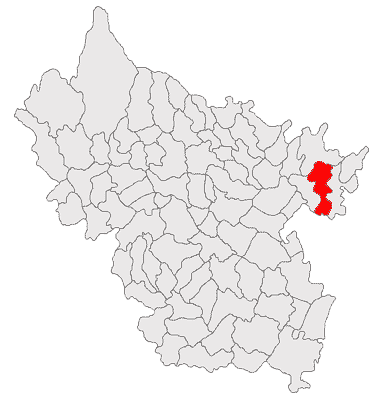
- Location in Buzău County

- Location in Romania
- Coordinates: 45°19′20″N 27°14′40″E
- Country: Romania
- County: Buzău

Government
  - Mayor (2020–2024): Marian Mărgărit (PSD)
- Area: 43.35 km^{2} (16.74 sq mi)
- Elevation: 48 m (157 ft)
- Population (2021-12-01): 1,970
  - Density: 45/km^{2} (120/sq mi)
- Time zone: EET/EEST (UTC+2/+3)
- Postal code: 127070
- Area code: +(40) 238
- Vehicle reg.: BZ
- Website: primariaboldu.ro

Boldu is a commune in Buzău County, Muntenia, Romania. It is composed of a single village, also called Boldu.

Historical population
Year	Pop.	±%
2002	2,554	—
2011	2,380	−6.8%
2021	1,970	−17.2%
Source: Census data
