= Blăjani =

- Commune
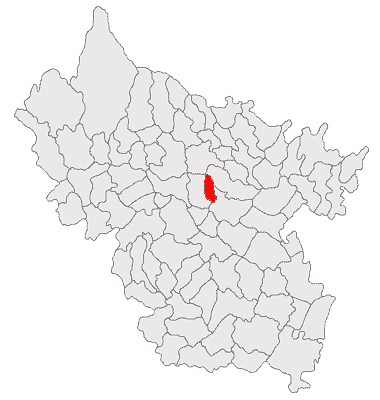
- Location in Buzău County

- Location in Romania
- Coordinates: 45°19′N 26°49′E
- Country: Romania
- County: Buzău
- Subdivisions: Blăjani, Sorești

Government
  - Mayor (2020–2024): Gheorghe Ispas (PSD)
- Area: 22.23 km^{2} (8.58 sq mi)
- Elevation: 350 m (1,150 ft)
- Population (2021-12-01): 905
  - Density: 41/km^{2} (110/sq mi)
- Time zone: EET/EEST (UTC+2/+3)
- Postal code: 127651
- Area code: +(40) 238
- Vehicle reg.: BZ
- Website: www.blajani.ro

Blăjani is a commune in Buzău County, Muntenia, Romania. It is composed of two villages, Blăjani and Sorești.

Historical population
| Year | Pop. | ±% |
|---|---|---|
| 2002 | 1,268 | — |
| 2011 | 1,132 | −10.7% |
| 2021 | 905 | −20.1% |
Source: Census data
