= Racovițeni =

- Commune
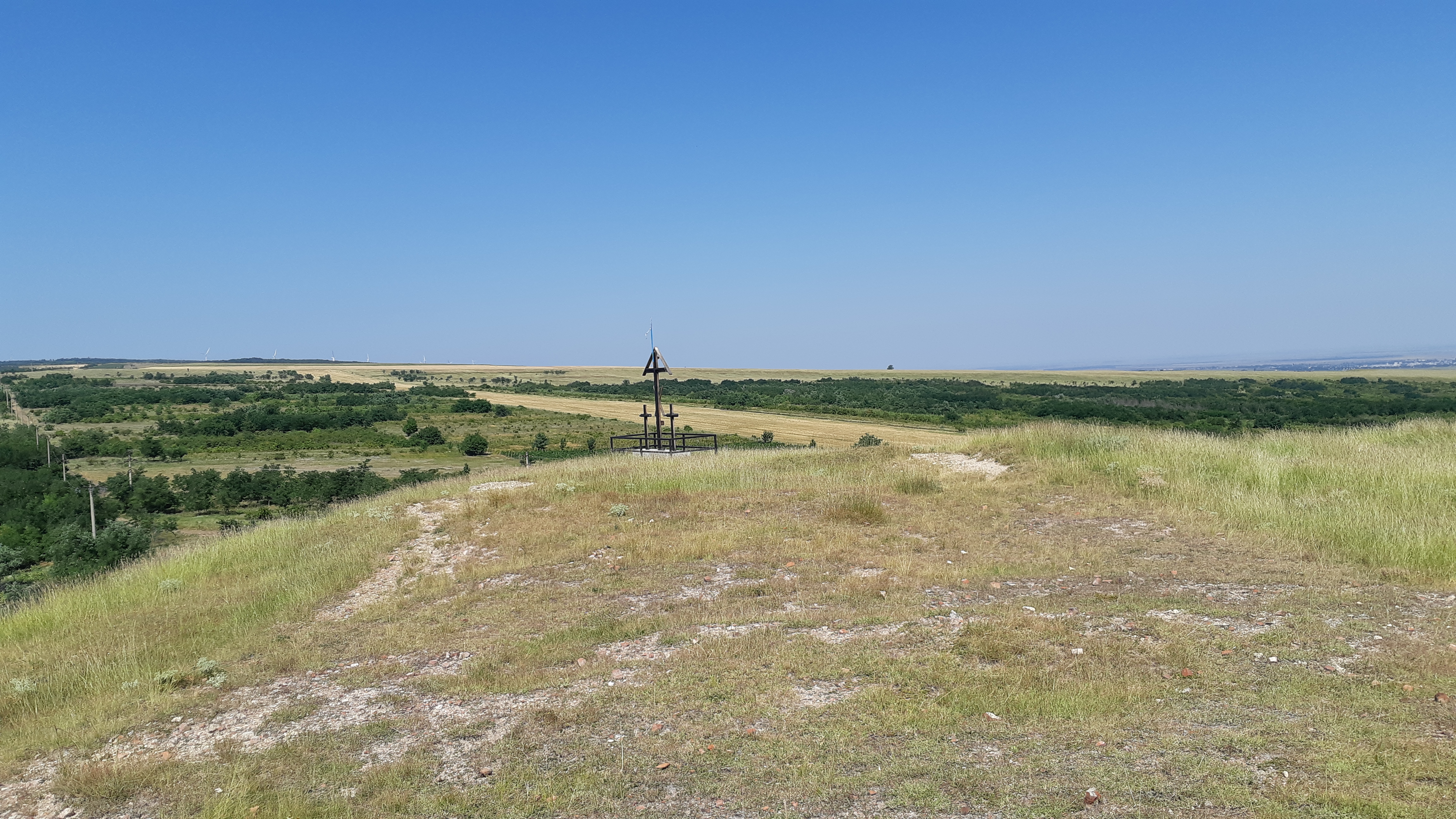
- The ruins of the Racovițeni Heroes Monument

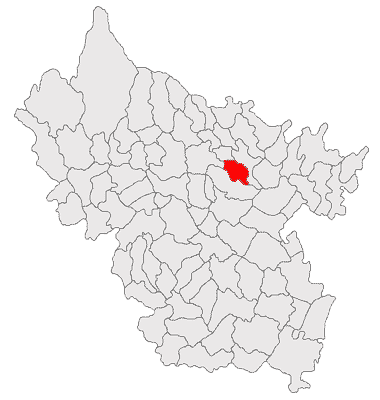
- Location in Buzău County

- Location in Romania
- Coordinates: 45°22′N 26°54′E
- Country: Romania
- County: Buzău
- Subdivisions: Budrea, Petrișoru, Racovițeni

Government
  - Mayor (2020–2024): Vergilius-Luis Manu (PSD)
- Area: 33.01 km^{2} (12.75 sq mi)
- Elevation: 230 m (750 ft)
- Population (2021-12-01): 1,192
  - Density: 36.11/km^{2} (93.53/sq mi)
- Time zone: UTC+02:00 (EET)
  - Summer (DST): UTC+03:00 (EEST)
- Postal code: 127505
- Area code: +(40) 238
- Vehicle reg.: BZ
- Website: racoviteni.ro

Racovițeni is a commune in Buzău County, Muntenia, Romania. It is composed of three villages: Budrea, Petrișoru, and Racovițeni.

Historical population
Year	Pop.	±%
2002	1,487	—
2011	1,424	−4.2%
2021	1,192	−16.3%
Source: Census data
