= Unguriu =

- Commune
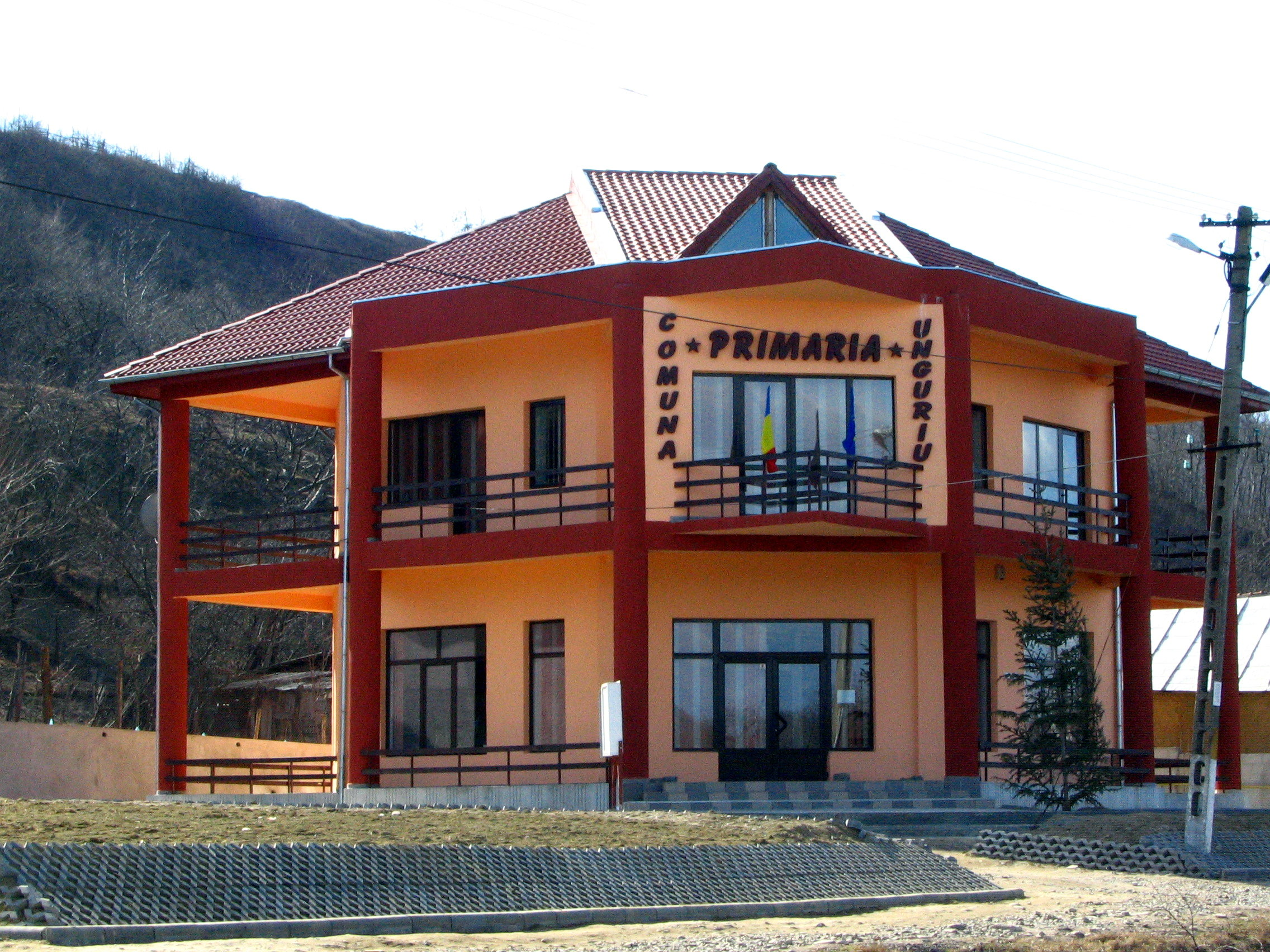
- Unguriu town hall

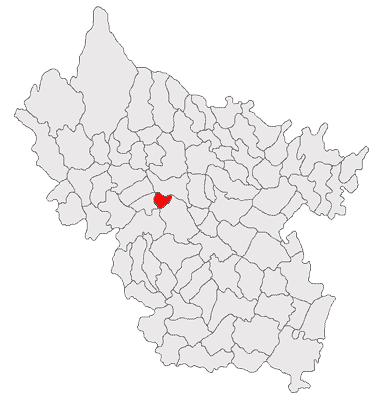
- Location in Buzău County

- Location in Romania
- Coordinates: 45°16′N 26°37′E
- Country: Romania
- County: Buzău
- Subdivisions: Unguriu, Ojasca

Government
  - Mayor (2020–2024): Gheorghiță Tirizică (PSD)
- Area: 16.27 km^{2} (6.28 sq mi)
- Elevation: 183 m (600 ft)
- Population (2021-12-01): 1,969
  - Density: 121.0/km^{2} (313.4/sq mi)
- Time zone: UTC+02:00 (EET)
  - Summer (DST): UTC+03:00 (EEST)
- Postal code: 127322
- Area code: +(40) 238
- Vehicle reg.: BZ
- Website: www.primariaunguriu.ro

Unguriu (Romanian pronunciation: [unɡuˈri.u]) is a commune in the Buzău County, Muntenia, Romania, 18 km (11 mi) north-west of Buzău, the county seat, on the banks of the Buzău River. It is composed of two villages, Ojasca and Unguriu.

== History ==
The first mention of Unguriu is an act of Constantine Mavrocordato from the year 1782, who transferred property of the village of Unguriu to the bishopric of Buzău. In the mid-17th century, nearby, at the Ciuciuri springs, the Unguriu monastery is built.

The village of Ojasca was first mentioned in 1715, when Luxandra Ierculeasa gave the same bishopric a patch of land there.

Between 1805 and 1821, the border between Wallachia and the Habsburg monarchy came at the Ojasca springs and therefore the Unguriu monastery was temporarily destroyed.

In 1968, the commune of Unguriu (with the villages Unguriu and Ojasca) was included within the commune of Măgura, but in the year 2004, the commune was reinstated.

== Economy ==
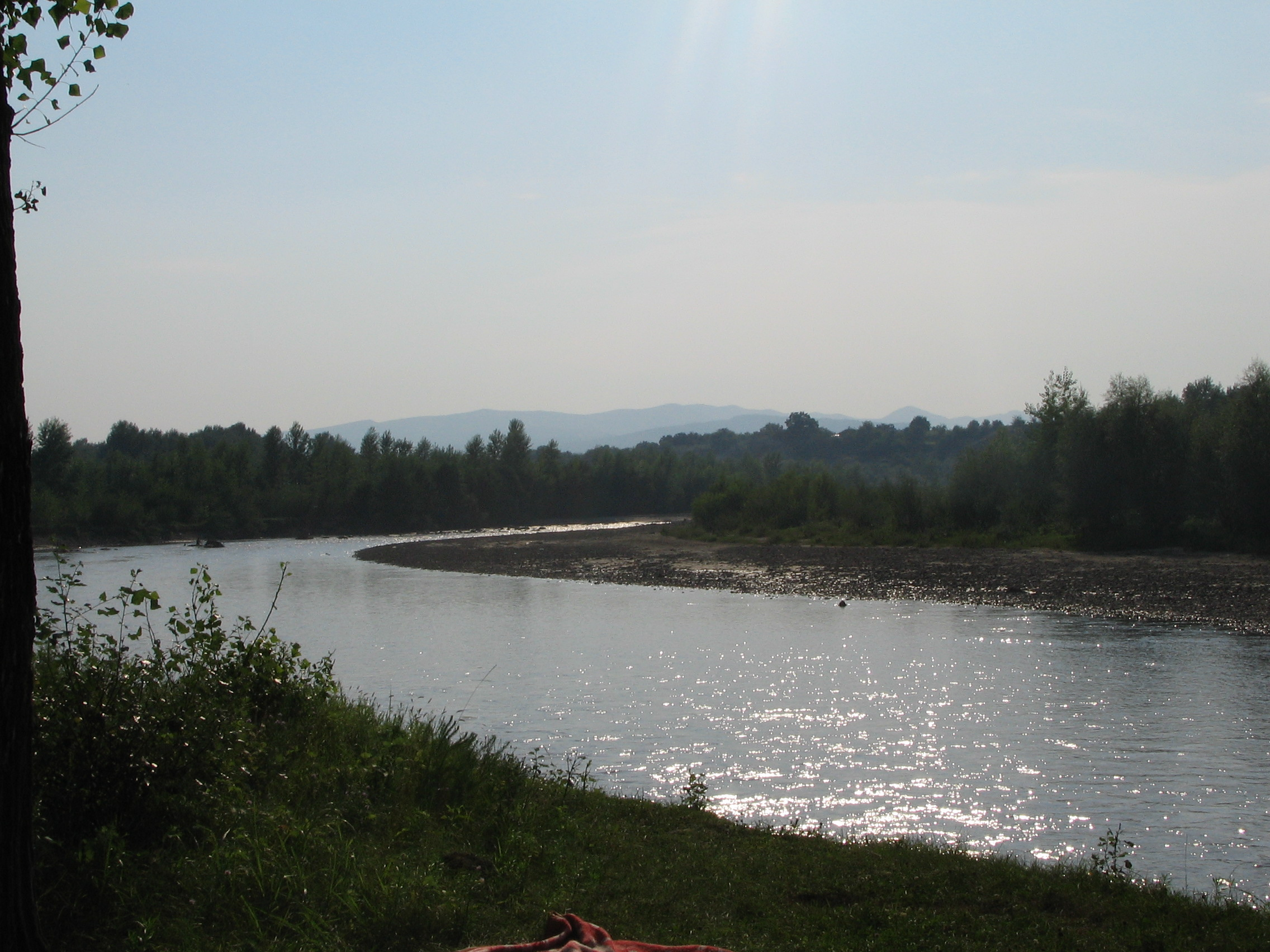
The Buzău River near Unguriu

Most of the people from Unguriu work in mining, oil extraction, construction, ceramics and glass manufacturing. Many people also practice agriculture, growing fruit and animals.

A number of 21 firms are located in Unguriu, in the fields of trading, production and processing of milk, metal casting, as well as mills and other service providers.

A coal mine was open between 1882–1962, and again between 1985–1997.

Historical population
Year	Pop.	±%
2002	2,440	—
2011	2,415	−1.0%
2021	1,969	−18.5%
Source: Census data

== Natives ==
- Aimée Iacobescu (1946–2018), actress
