= Largu =

- Commune
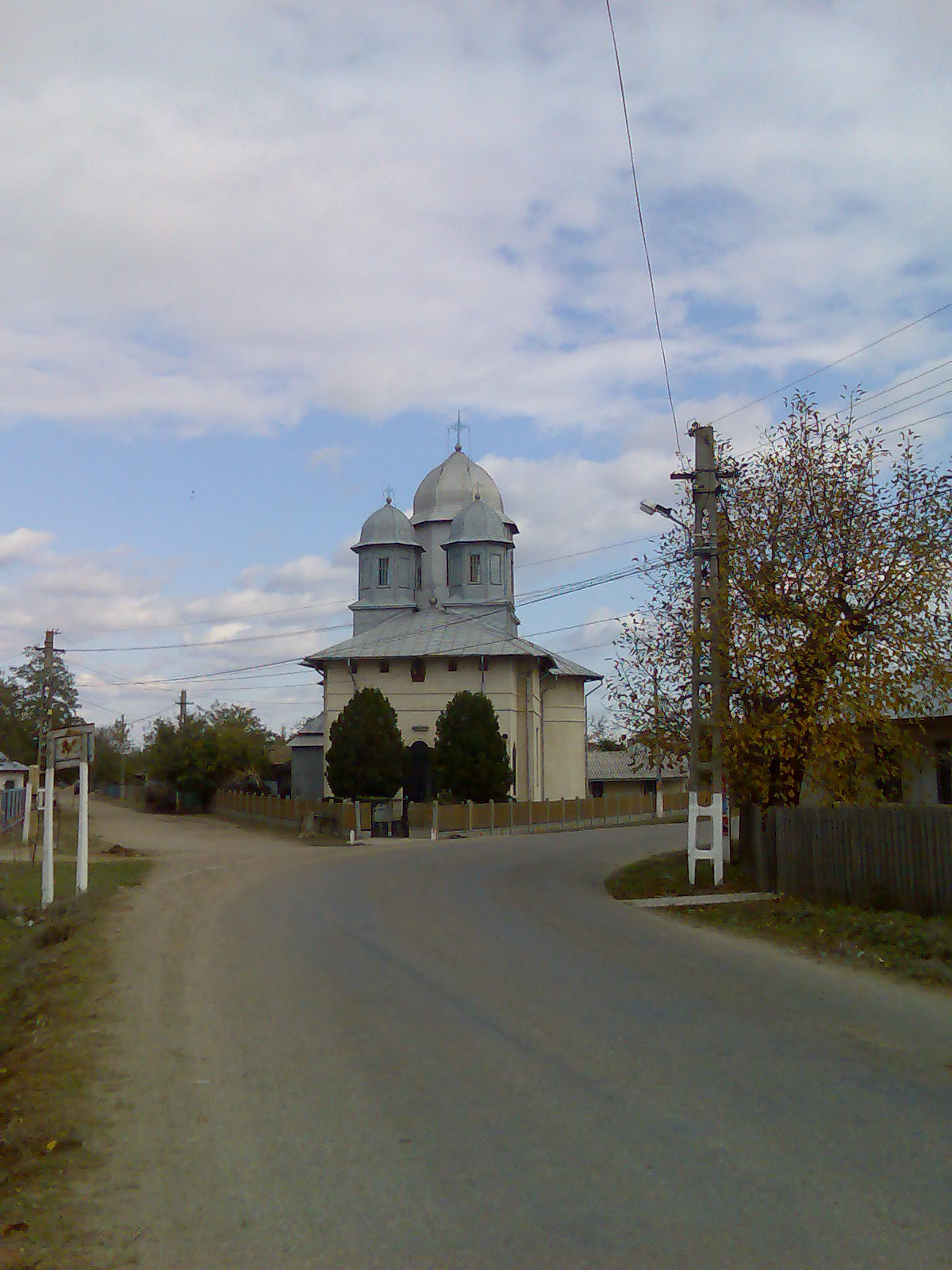
- St. Elijah Church in Largu

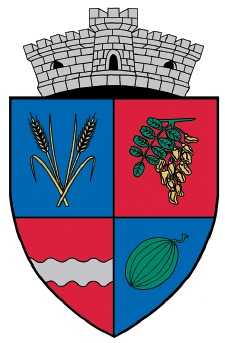
- Coat of arms

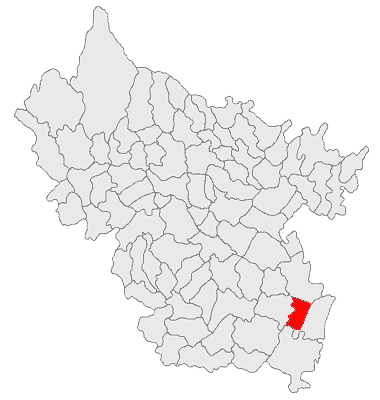
- Location in Buzău County

- Location in Romania
- Coordinates: 44°58′30″N 27°8′40″E
- Country: Romania
- County: Buzău
- Subdivisions: Largu, Scărlătești

Government
  - Mayor (2020–2024): Stănel Neculai (PSD)
- Area: 41.94 km^{2} (16.19 sq mi)
- Elevation: 54 m (177 ft)
- Population (2021-12-01): 1,245
  - Density: 29.69/km^{2} (76.88/sq mi)
- Time zone: UTC+02:00 (EET)
  - Summer (DST): UTC+03:00 (EEST)
- Postal code: 127290
- Area code: +(40) 238
- Vehicle reg.: BZ
- Website: primarialargu.ro

Largu is a commune in Buzău County, Muntenia, Romania. It is composed of two villages, Largu and Scărlătești.

Historical population
Year	Pop.	±%
2002	1,790	—
2011	1,526	−14.7%
2021	1,245	−18.4%
Source: Census data

== Notes ==
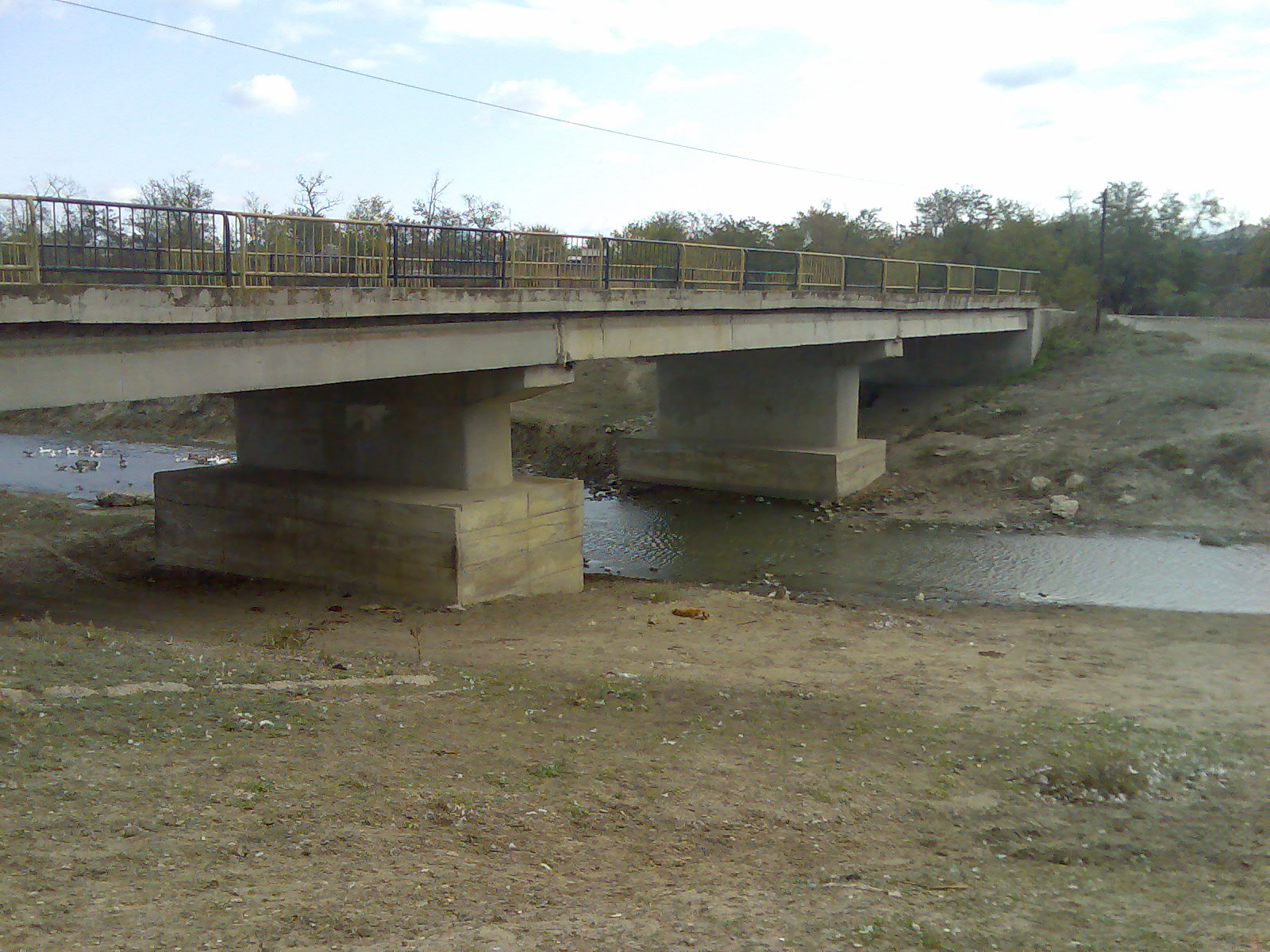
Bridge over the Călmățui River in Largu
