= Cănești =

- Commune
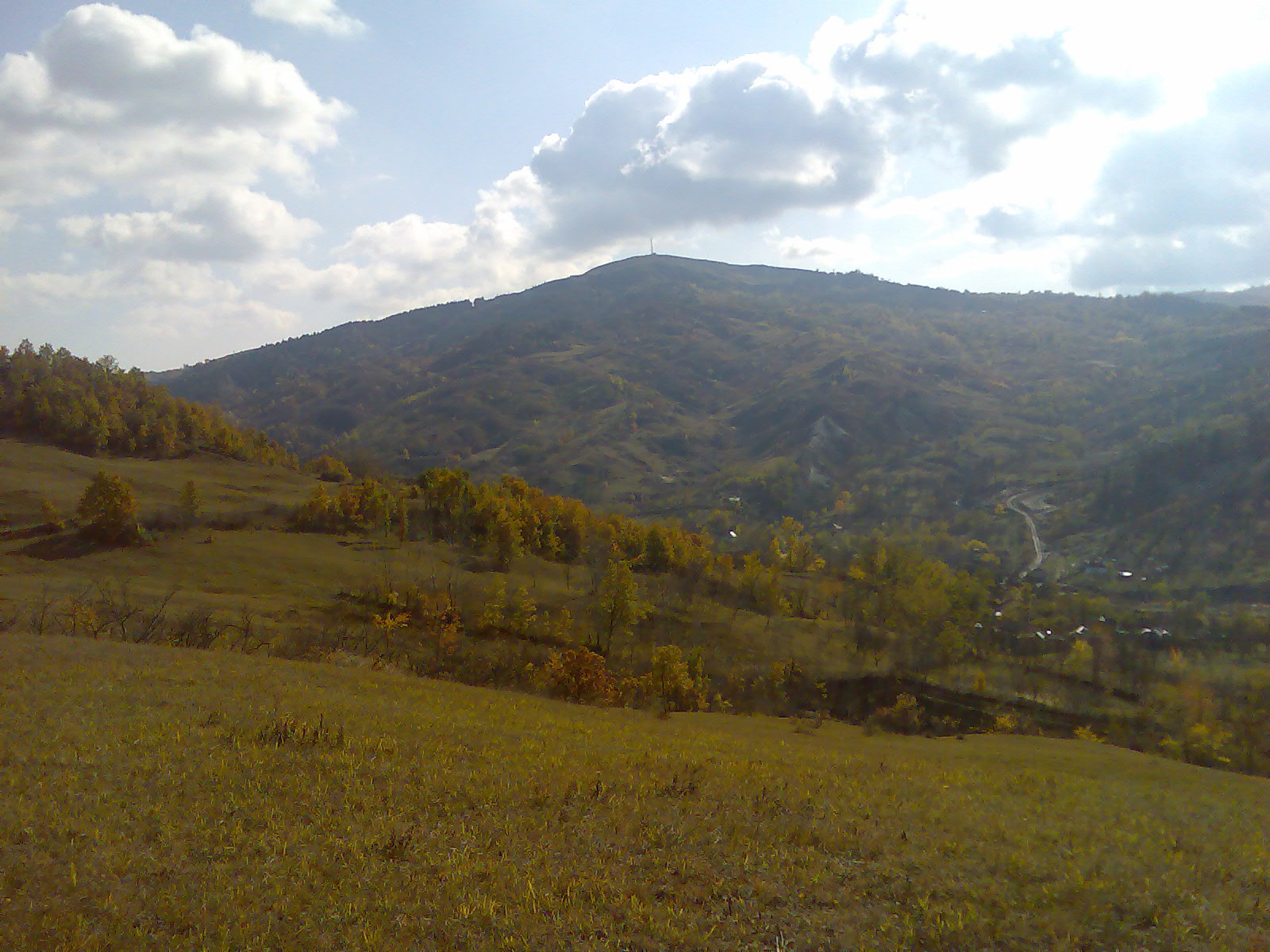

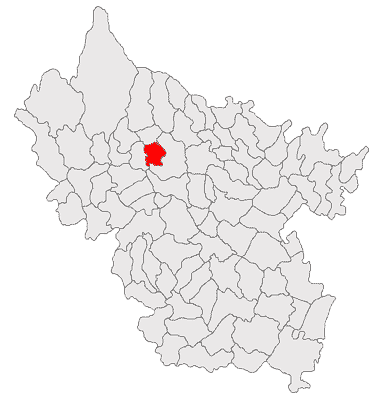
- Location in Buzău County

- Location in Romania
- Coordinates: 45°24′N 26°36′E
- Country: Romania
- County: Buzău
- Subdivisions: Cănești, Gonțești, Negoșina, Păcuri, Șuchea, Valea Verzei

Government
  - Mayor (2020–2024): Stoica Marin (PSD)
- Area: 31.41 km^{2} (12.13 sq mi)
- Elevation: 289 m (948 ft)
- Population (2021-12-01): 623
  - Density: 19.8/km^{2} (51.4/sq mi)
- Time zone: UTC+02:00 (EET)
  - Summer (DST): UTC+03:00 (EEST)
- Postal code: 127135
- Area code: +(40) 238
- Vehicle reg.: BZ
- Website: www.comunacanesti.ro

Cănești is a commune in Buzău County, Muntenia, Romania. It's composed of six villages: Cănești, Gonțești, Negoșina, Păcuri, Șuchea, and Valea Verzei.

Historical population
Year	Pop.	±%
2002	1,091	—
2011	898	−17.7%
2021	623	−30.6%
Source: Census data
