= Rușețu =

- Commune
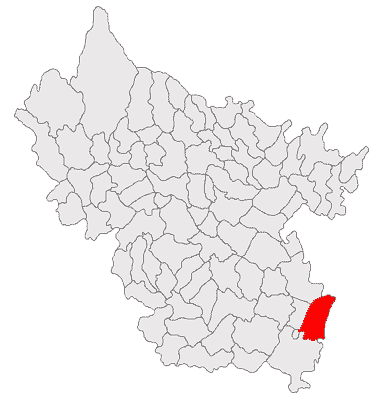
- Location in Buzău County

- Location in Romania
- Coordinates: 44°57′N 27°13′E
- Country: Romania
- County: Buzău
- Subdivisions: Rușețu, Sergent Ionel Ștefan

Government
  - Mayor (2020–2024): Florin Snae (PSD)
- Area: 101.86 km^{2} (39.33 sq mi)
- Elevation: 46 m (151 ft)
- Population (2021-12-01): 3,173
  - Density: 31.15/km^{2} (80.68/sq mi)
- Time zone: EET/EEST (UTC+2/+3)
- Postal code: 127520
- Area code: +(40) 238
- Vehicle reg.: BZ
- Website: www.primariarusetu.ro

Rușețu (Romanian pronunciation: [ruˈʃet͡su]) is a commune in Buzău County, Muntenia, Romania. It is composed of two villages, Rușețu and Sergent Ionel Ștefan.

Historical population
Year	Pop.	±%
2002	4,316	—
2011	3,720	−13.8%
2021	3,173	−14.7%
Source: Census data
