= Buzău County =

County of Romania

Buzău County Județul Buzău
- County
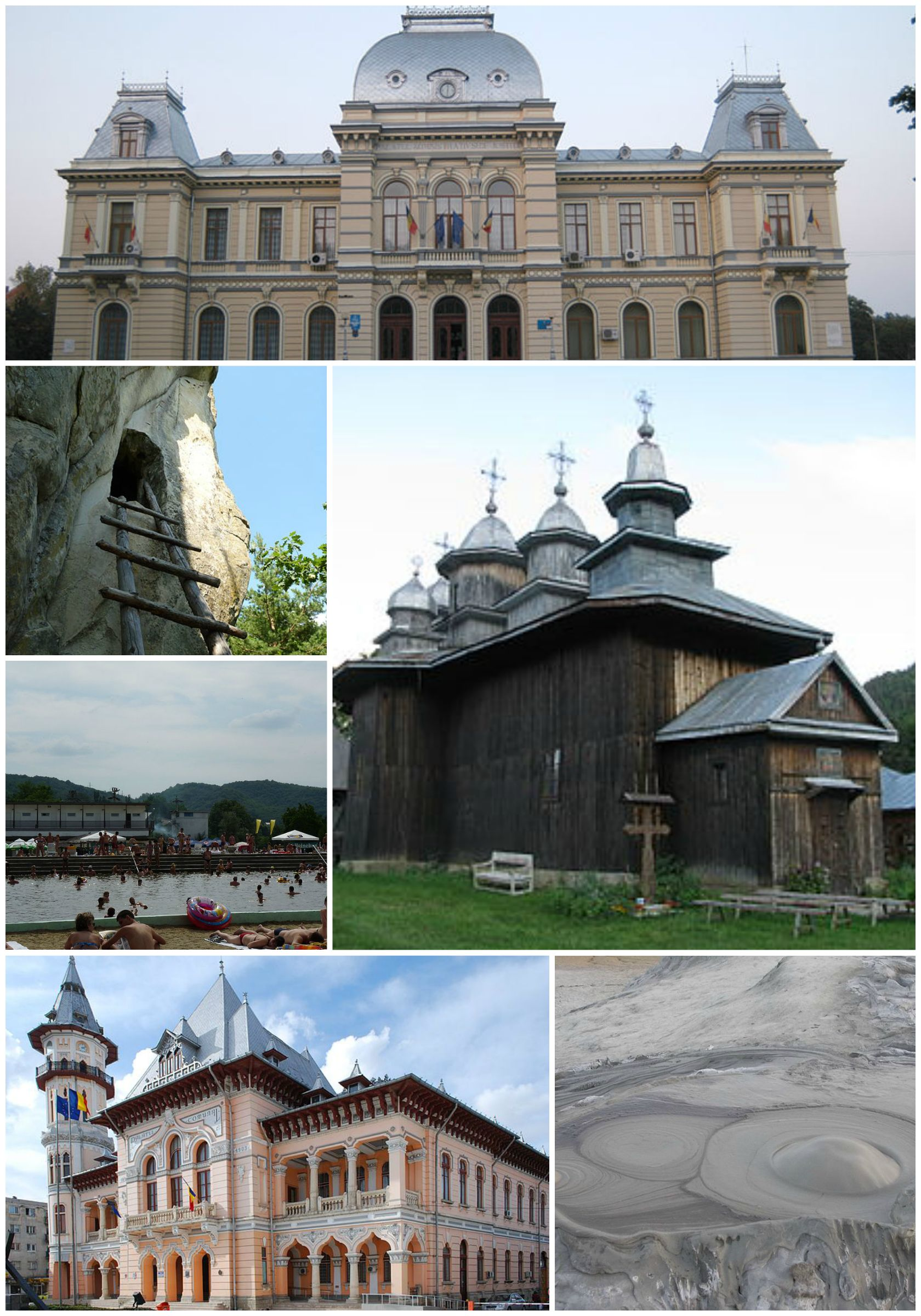

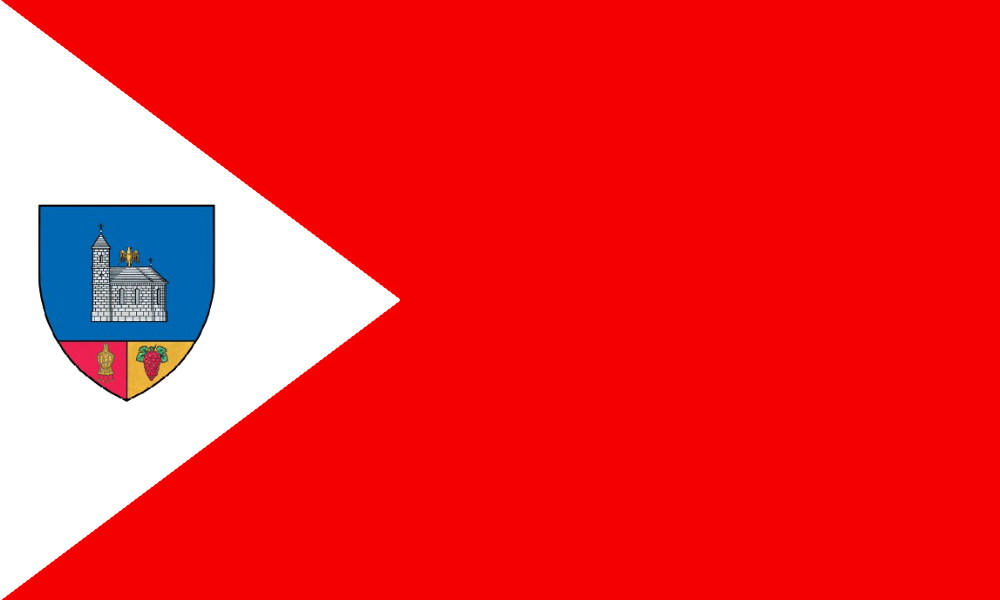
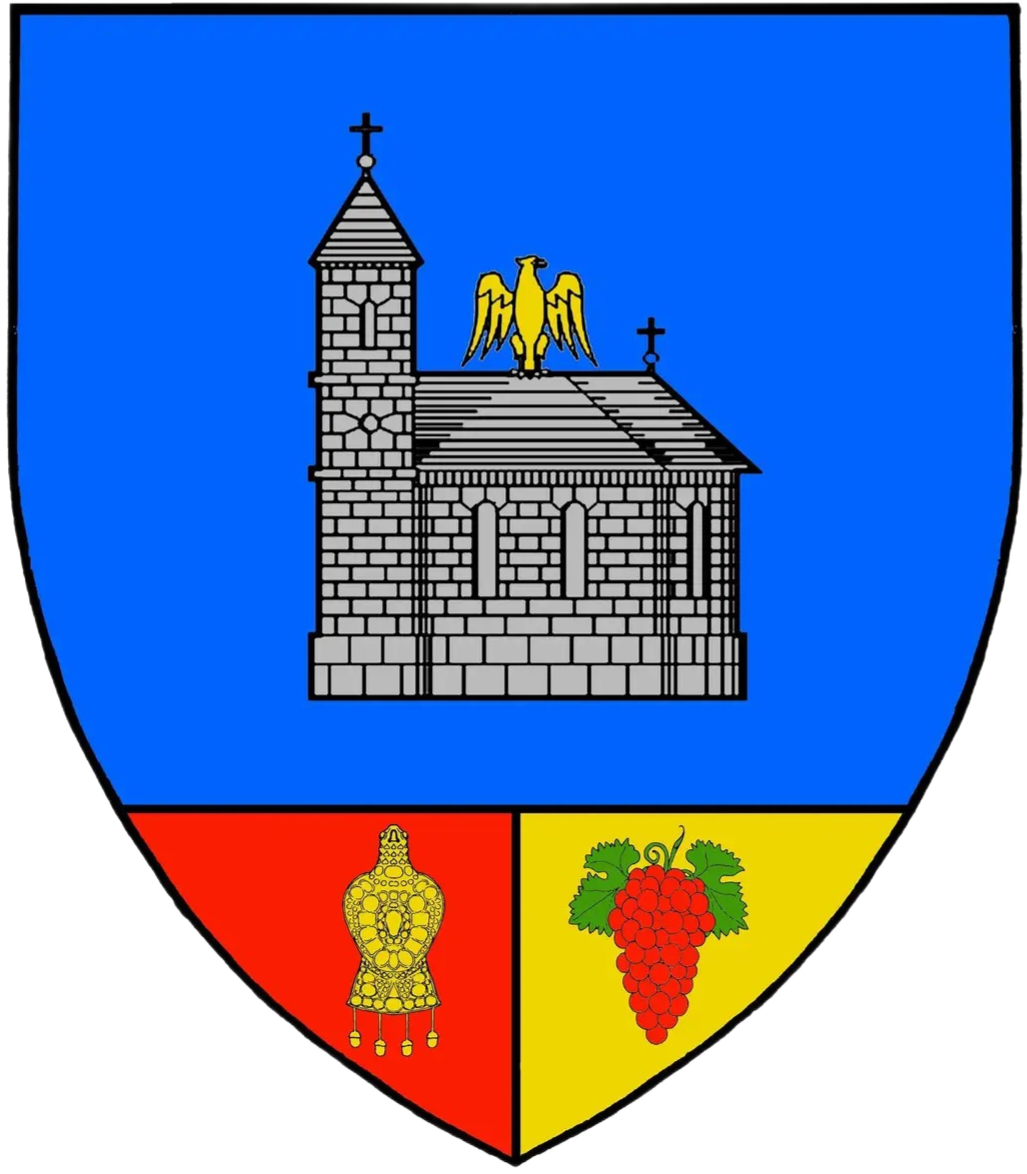
- Flag Coat of arms

- Coordinates: 45.27°N 26.77°E
- Country: Romania
- Development region^{1}: Sud-Est
- Historic region: Muntenia
- Capital city (Reședință de județ): Buzău

Government
  - Type: County Council
  - President of the County Board: Marcel Ciolacu (PSD)
  - Prefect^{2}: Daniel Marian Ticlea

Area
  - Total: 6,103 km^{2} (2,356 sq mi)
  - Rank: 17th in Romania

Population (2021-12-01)
  - Total: 404,979
  - Rank: 18th in Romania
  - Density: 66.36/km^{2} (171.9/sq mi)
- Time zone: UTC+2 (EET)
  - Summer (DST): UTC+3 (EEST)
- Postal Code: 12wxyz^{3}
- Area code: +40 x38^{4}
- Car Plates: BZ^{5}
- GDP: US$2.561 billion (2015)
- GDP/per capita: US$5,927 (2015)
- Website: County Council; County Prefecture
- ^{1}The developing regions of Romania have no administrative role. They were formed just to attract funds from the European Union^{2} as of 2007, the Prefect is not a politician, but a public functionary. He (or she) is not allowed to be a member of a political party, and is banned to have any political activity in the first six months after the resignation (or exclusion) from the public functionary corps^{3}w, x, y, and z are digits that indicate the city, the street, part of the street, or even the building of the address^{4}x is a digit indicating the operator: 2 for the former national operator, Romtelecom, and 3 for the other ground telephone networks^{5}used on both the plates of the vehicles that operate only in the county limits (like utility vehicles, ATVs, etc.), and the ones used outside the county

Buzău County (Romanian pronunciation: [buˈzəw]) is a county (județ) of Romania, in the historical region Muntenia, with the capital city at Buzău.

== Demographics ==
In 2011, it had a population of 432,054 and the population density was 70.7/km^{2}.

- Romanians – 97%
- Romani – under 3% declared and others

Year	County population
1948	430,225
1956	465,829 ▲
1966	480,951 ▲
1977	508,424 ▲
1992	516,307 ▲
2002	496,214 ▼
2011	432,054 ▼
2021	404,979 ▼

== Geography ==
This county has a total area of 6,103 km^{2}.

In the North Side there are the mountains from the southern end of the Eastern Carpathians group – the Vrancea Mountains and the Buzău Mountains with heights over 1,700 m. The heights decrease in the South and East passing through the subcarpathian hills to the Bărăgan Plain at about 80 m.

The main river crossing the county is the Buzău River which collects many small rivers from the mountains and flows to the East into the Siret River.

=== Neighbours ===
- Brăila County to the east.
- Prahova County and Brașov County to the west.
- Covasna County and Vrancea County to the north.
- Ialomița County to the south.

== Economy ==
The predominant industries in the county are:

- Mechanical components; railway and automotive components
- Metallurgical parts
- Glass
- Food
- Textiles
- Wood

The hilly area is well-suited for wines and fruit orchards. Salt and oil are the main resources extracted in the county.

== Tourism ==
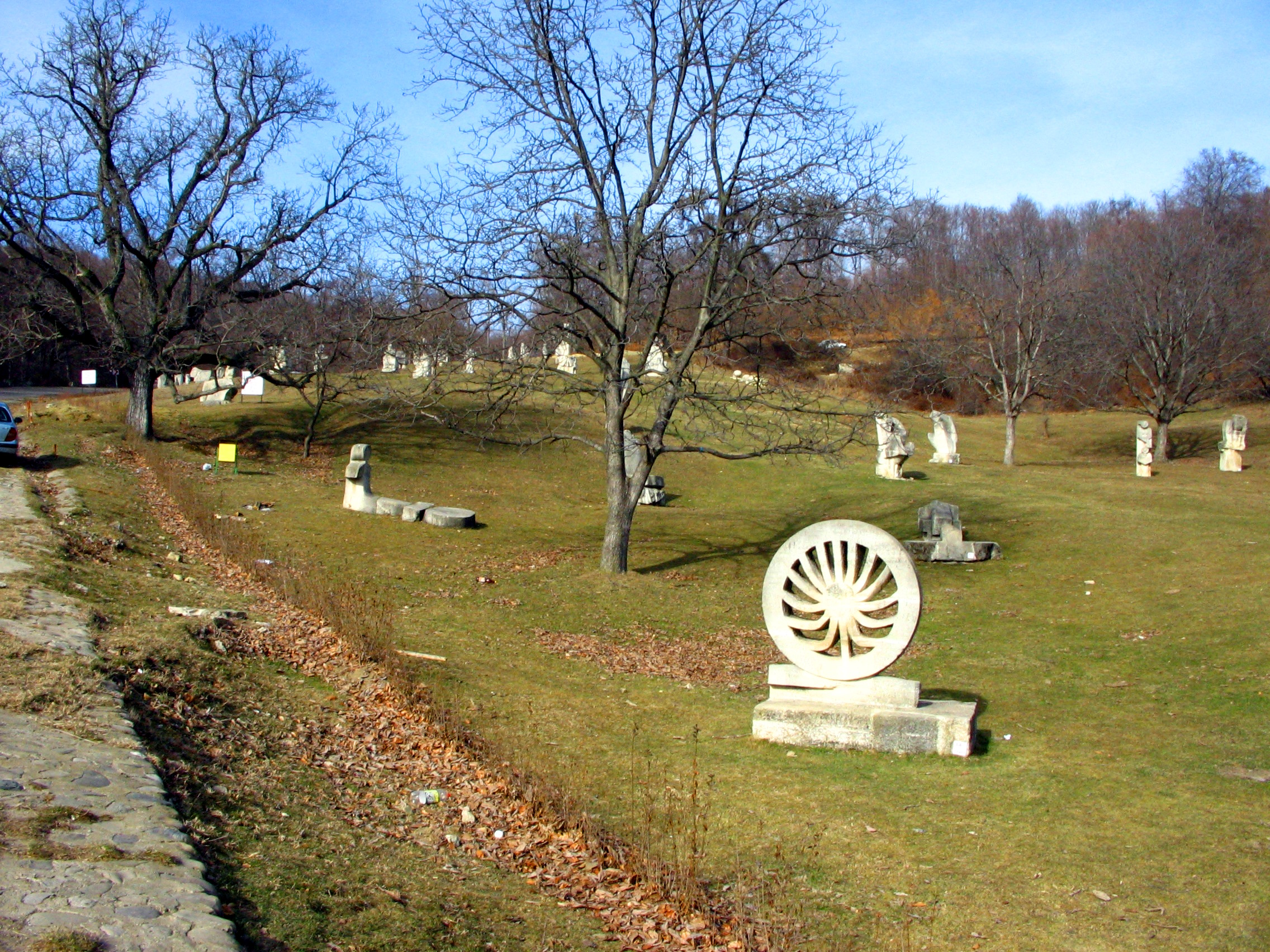
The Măgura sculpture camp

The main tourist destinations are:

- The city of Buzău.
- The Vrancea Mountains and Buzău Mountains.
- The Berca Mud Volcanoes
- The amber museum in Colți
- The Ciolanu Monastery and the Măgura sculpture camp
- The Rătești Monastery
- The Sărata-Monteoru Resort.

== Politics ==
The Buzău County Council, renewed at the 2020 local elections, consists of 32 counsellors, with the following party composition:

Party	Seats	Current County Council
Social Democratic Party (PSD)	21	
National Liberal Party (PNL)	7	
People's Movement Party (PMP)	4	

== Administrative divisions ==
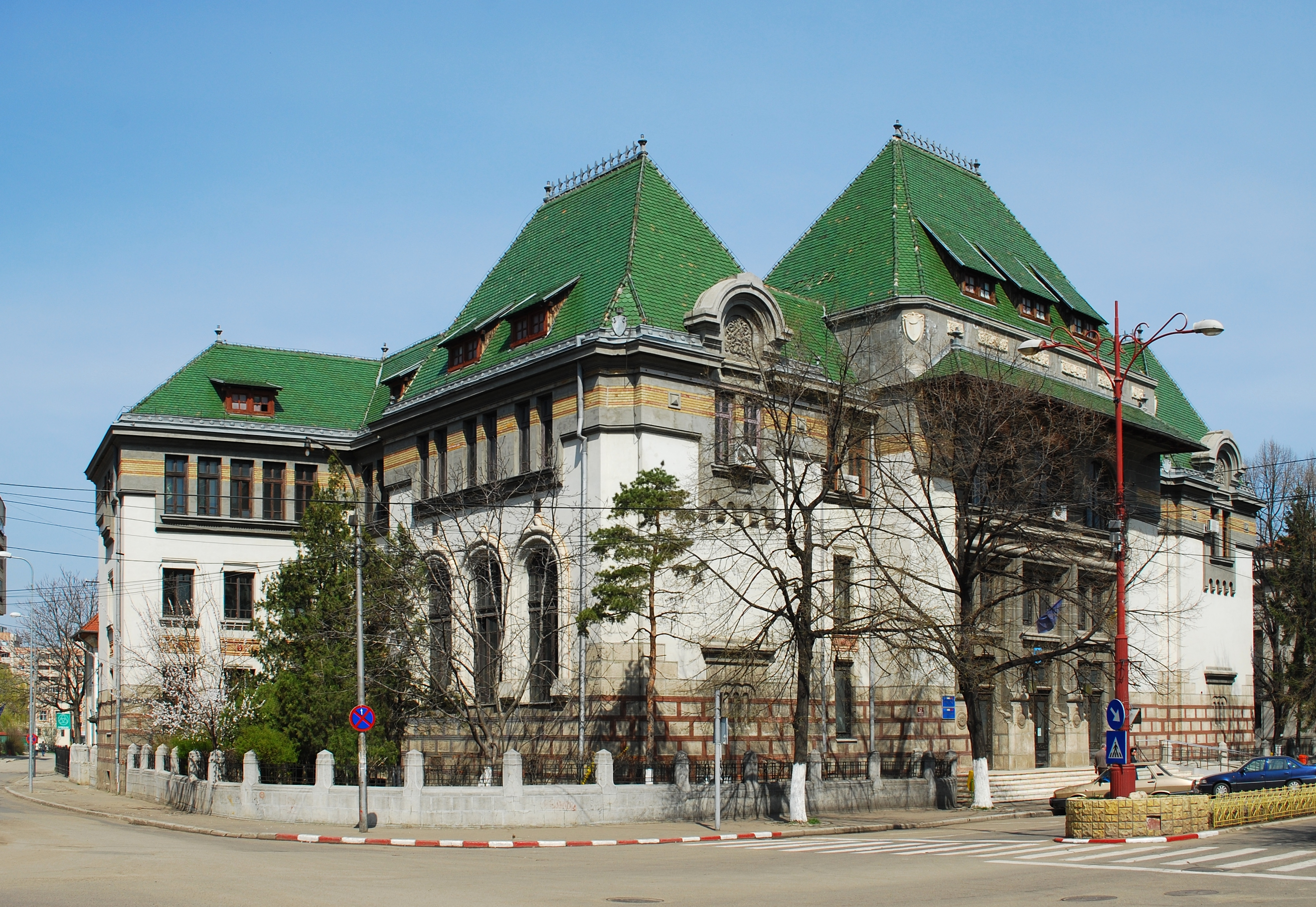
Buzău

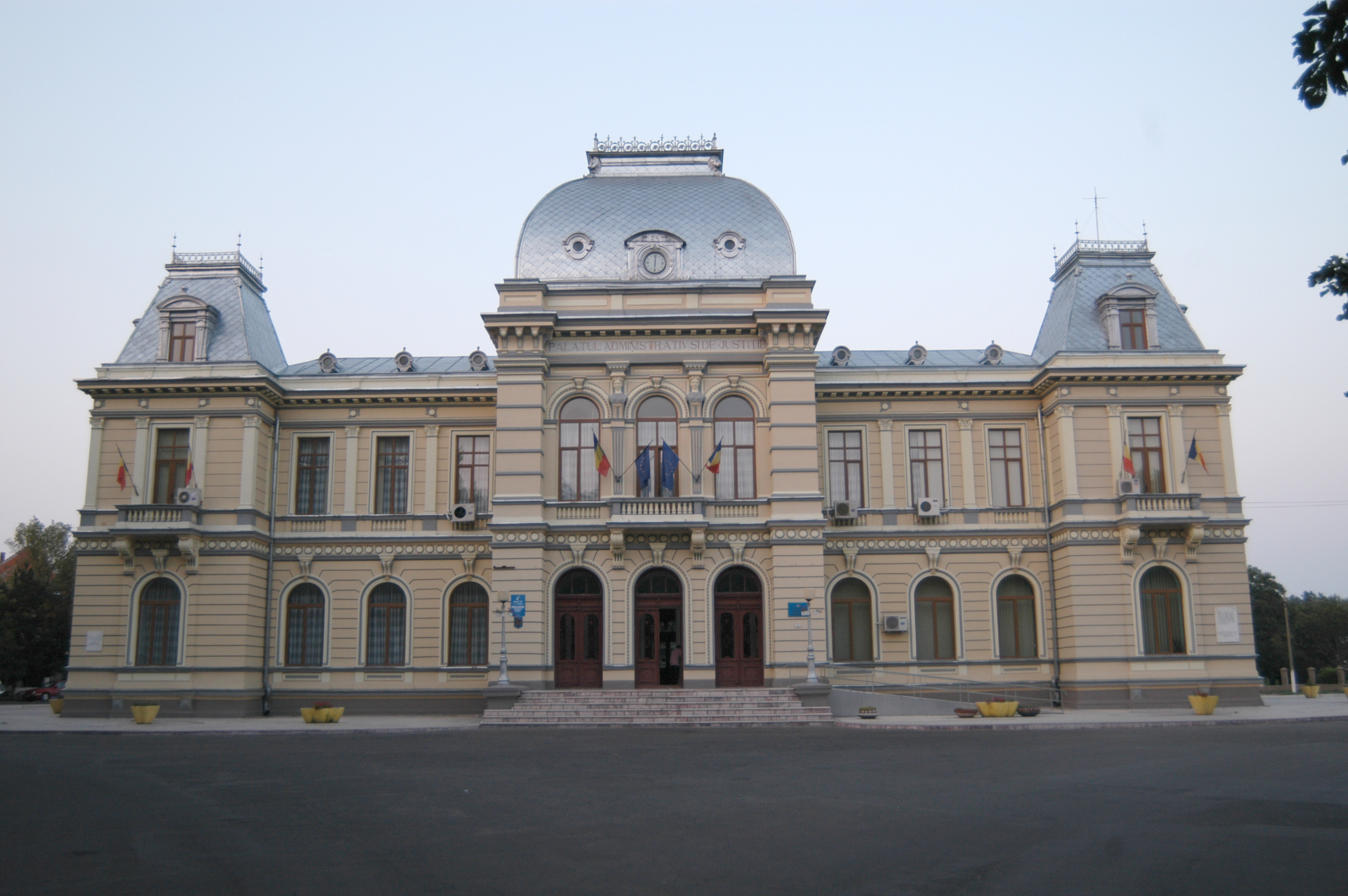
Râmnicu Sărat

Buzău County has 2 municipalities, 3 towns and 82 communes.

- Municipalities
  - Buzău – capital city; population: 108,384 (as of 2011)
  - Râmnicu Sărat
- Towns
  - Nehoiu
  - Pătârlagele
  - Pogoanele
- Communes
  - Amaru
  - Bălăceanu
  - Balta Albă
  - Beceni
  - Berca
  - Bisoca
  - Blăjani
  - Boldu
  - Bozioru
  - Brădeanu
  - Brăești
  - Breaza
  - Buda
  - C.A. Rosetti
  - Calvini
  - Cănești
  - Cătina
  - Cernătești
  - Chiliile
  - Chiojdu
  - Cilibia
  - Cislău
  - Cochirleanca
  - Colți
  - Costești
  - Cozieni
  - Florica
  - Gălbinași
  - Gherăseni
  - Ghergheasa
  - Glodeanu Sărat
  - Glodeanu-Siliștea
  - Grebănu
  - Gura Teghii
  - Largu
  - Lopătari
  - Luciu
  - Măgura
  - Mărăcineni
  - Mărgăritești
  - Mânzălești
  - Merei
  - Mihăilești
  - Movila Banului
  - Murgești
  - Năeni
  - Odăile
  - Padina
  - Pardoși
  - Pănătău
  - Pârscov
  - Pietroasele
  - Podgoria
  - Poșta Câlnău
  - Puiești
  - Racovițeni
  - Râmnicelu
  - Robeasca
  - Rușețu
  - Săgeata
  - Săhăteni
  - Săpoca
  - Sărulești
  - Scorțoasa
  - Scutelnici
  - Siriu
  - Smeeni
  - Stâlpu
  - Tisău
  - Topliceni
  - Țintești
  - Ulmeni
  - Unguriu
  - Vadu Pașii
  - Valea Râmnicului
  - Valea Salciei
  - Vâlcelele
  - Vernești
  - Vintilă Vodă
  - Viperești
  - Zărnești
  - Ziduri

== Historical county ==
Județul Buzău
- County (Județ)
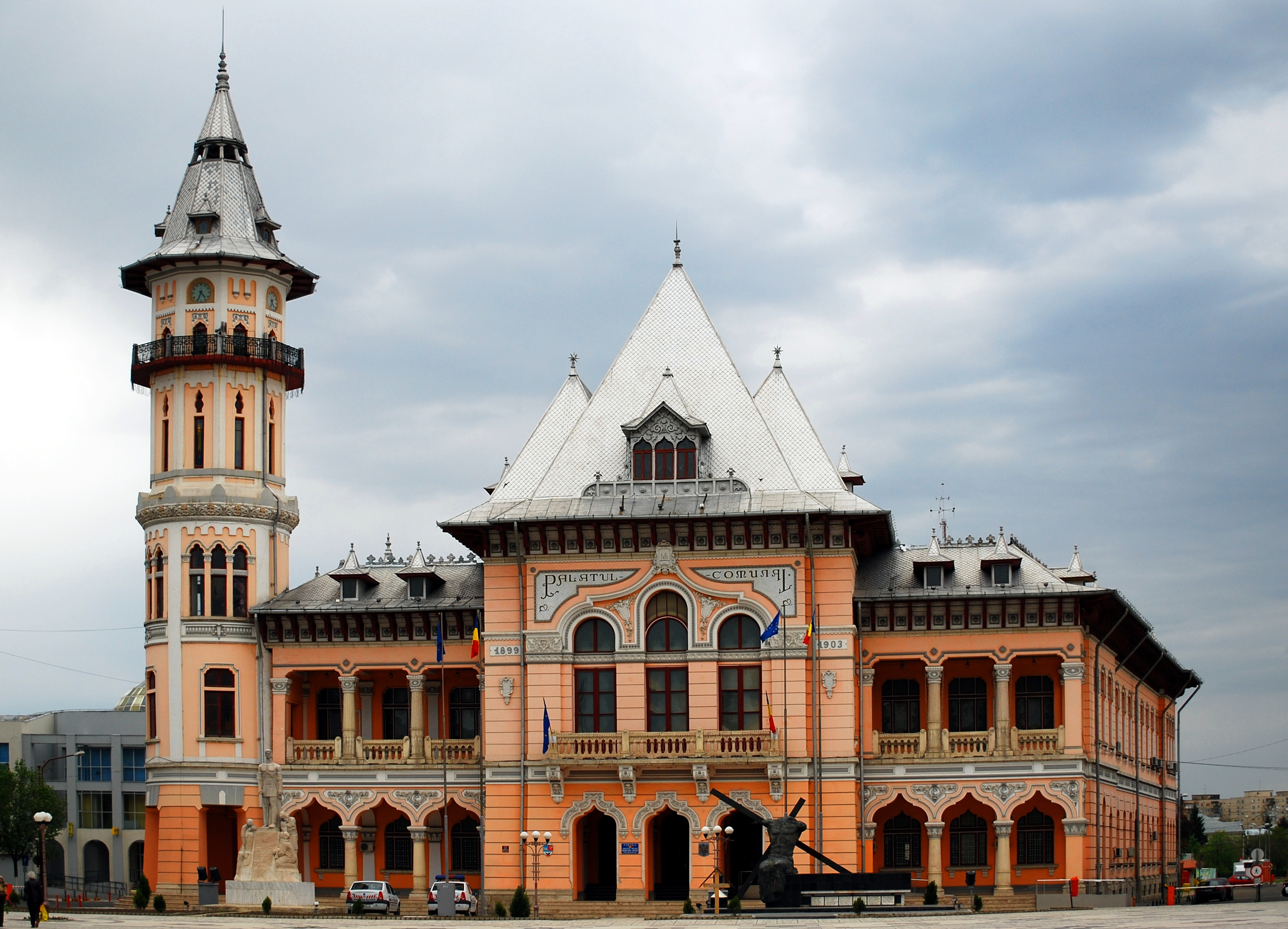
- The Buzău County prefecture building of the interwar period.

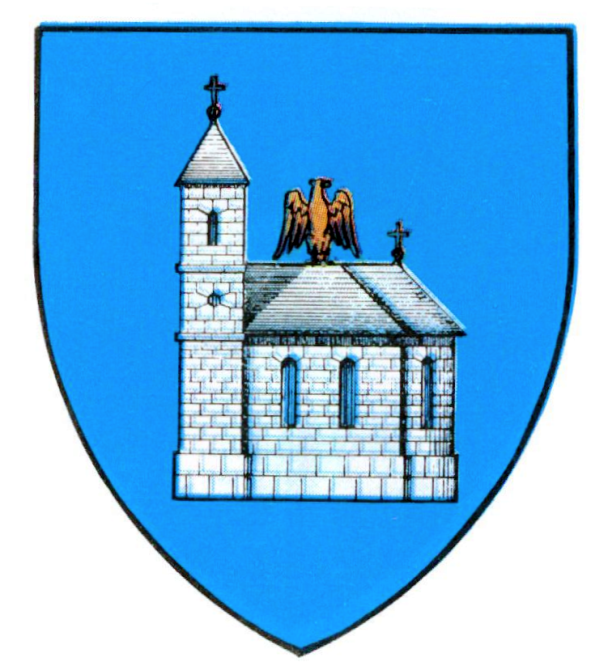
- Coat of arms

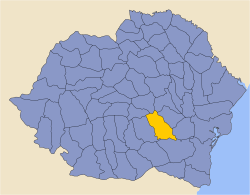
- Country: Romania
- Historic region: Muntenia
- Capital city (Reședință de județ): Buzău

Area
  - Total: 4,936 km^{2} (1,906 sq mi)

Population (1930)
  - Total: 309,405
  - Density: 62.68/km^{2} (162.3/sq mi)
- Time zone: UTC+2 (EET)
  - Summer (DST): UTC+3 (EEST)

Historically, the county was located in the central-southern part of Greater Romania, in the northeastern part of the historical region of Muntenia. Its territory included the southern and western parts of today's Buzău County and several localities that are today in Prahova County, including the town of Mizil. It was bordered on the west by Prahova County, to the north by the counties of Brașov, Trei Scaune, and Putna, to the east by the counties of Râmnicu Sărat and Brăila, and to the south by Ialomița County.

=== Administration ===
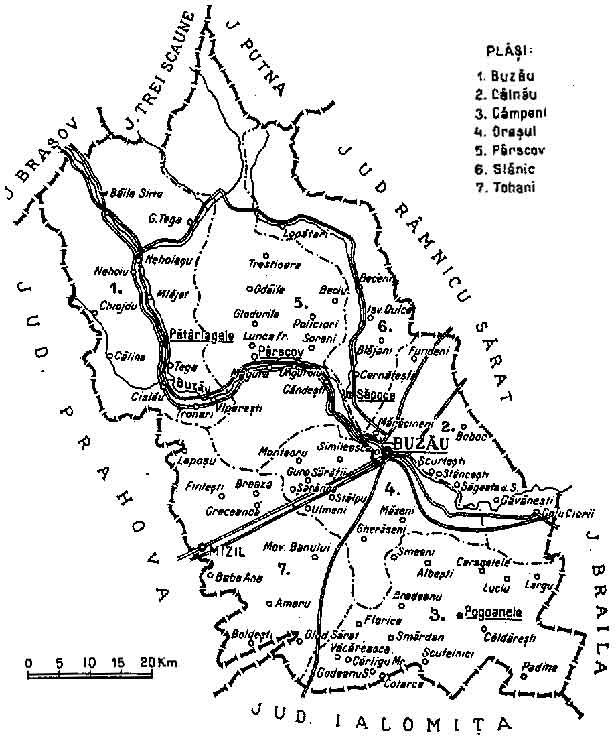
Map of Buzău County as constituted in 1938.

The county has seen multiple subdivisions administratively.

At the end of the 19th century, the county was subdivided into six districts (plăși):

1. Plasa Sărata, with the town of Buzău and 16 communes
2. Plasa Câmpului, with 14 communes
3. Plasa Tohani, with the town of Mizil and 17 communes
4. Plasa Buzău, with 17 communes
5. Plasa Pârscov, with 16 communes
6. Plasa Slănic, with 19 communes

In the interwar period, the territory of the county was initially divided into four districts:

1. Plasa Buzău, headquartered at Pătârlagele
2. Plasa Câmpul, headquartered at Buzău
3. Plasa Slănic, headquartered at Săpoca
4. Plasa Tohani, headquartered at Mizil

Subsequently, the territory of the county was reorganized into seven districts, by abolishing Plasa Câmpul and establishing four new districts:

1. Plasa Buzău, headquartered at Pătârlagele
2. Plasa Câlnău, headquartered at Buzău
3. Plasa Câmpeni, headquartered at Pogoanele
4. Plasa Orașul, headquartered at Buzău
5. Plasa Pârscov, headquartered at Pârscov
6. Plasa Slănic, headquartered at Săpoca
7. Plasa Tohani, headquartered at Mizil

=== Population ===
According to the 1930 census data, the county population was 309,405 inhabitants, ethnically divided as follows: 97.4% Romanians, 1.5% Romanies, 0.5% Jews, as well as other minorities. From the religious point of view, the population was 98.9% Eastern Orthodox, 0.5% Jewish, as well as other minorities.

==== Urban population ====
In 1930, the county's urban population was 42,127 inhabitants, comprising 91.2% Romanians, 3.7% Jews, 2.3% Romanies, 0.9% Hungarians, as well as other minorities. From the religious point of view, the urban population was composed of 93.3% Eastern Orthodox, 3.9% Jewish, 1.0% Roman Catholic, as well as other minorities.
