= Pardoși =

- Commune
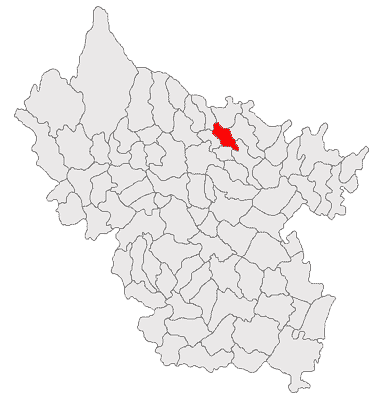
- Location in Buzău County

- Location in Romania
- Coordinates: 45°27′N 26°53′E
- Country: Romania
- County: Buzău
- Subdivisions: Chiperu, Costomiru, Pardoși, Valea lui Lalu, Valea Șchiopului

Government
  - Mayor (2020–2024): Iulian Preda (PNL)
- Area: 22.65 km^{2} (8.75 sq mi)
- Elevation: 391 m (1,283 ft)
- Population (2021-12-01): 315
  - Density: 13.9/km^{2} (36.0/sq mi)
- Time zone: EET/EEST (UTC+2/+3)
- Postal code: 127415
- Area code: +(40) 238
- Vehicle reg.: BZ
- Website: www.pardosi.ro

Pardoși is a commune in Buzău County, Muntenia, Romania. It is composed of five villages: Chiperu, Costomiru, Pardoși, Valea lui Lalu, and Valea Șchiopului.

Historical population
Year	Pop.	±%
2002	578	—
2011	453	−21.6%
2021	315	−30.5%
Source: Census data
