= Breaza, Buzău =

Breaza
- Commune
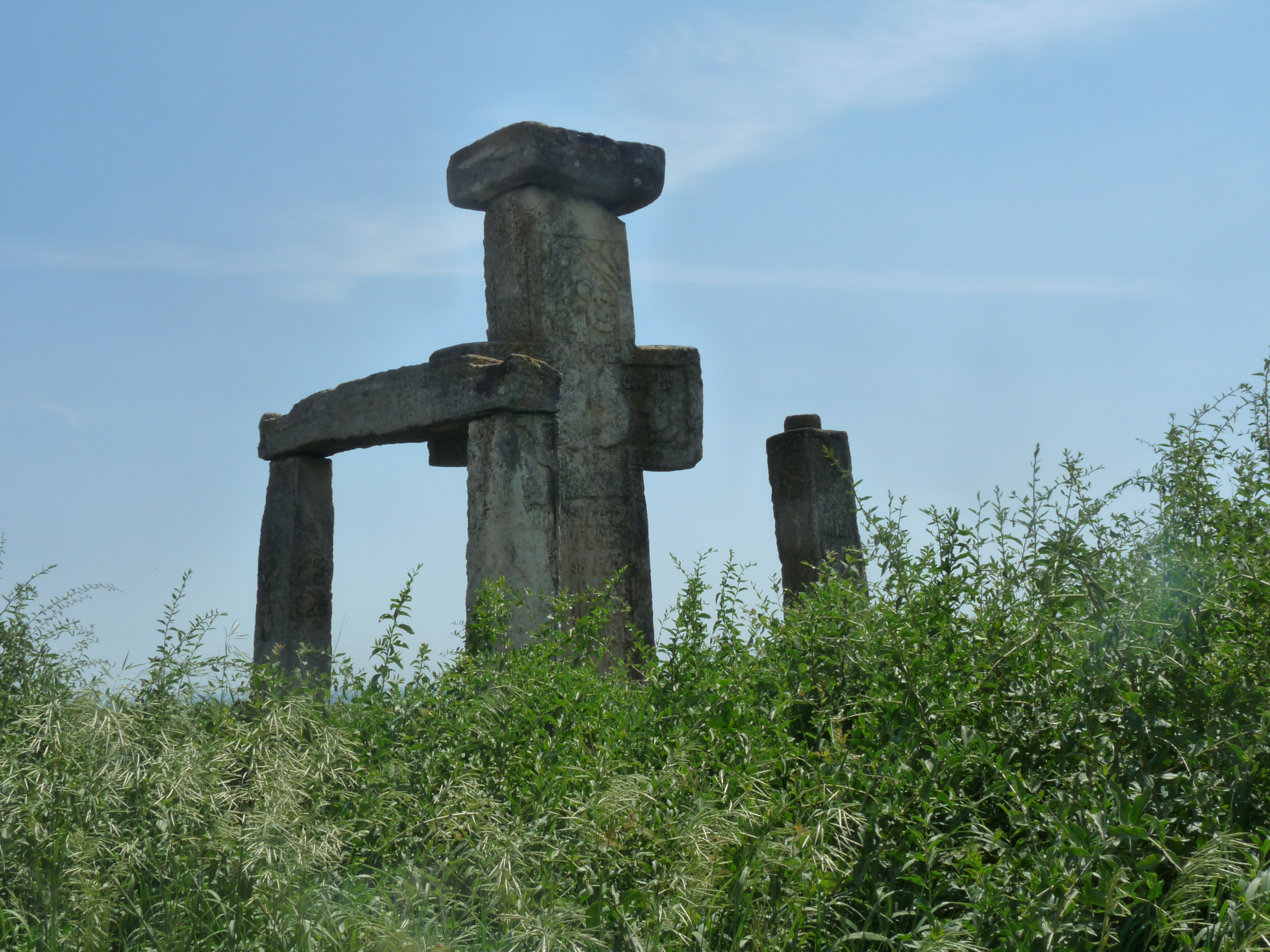
- Manafu cross near Greceanca village

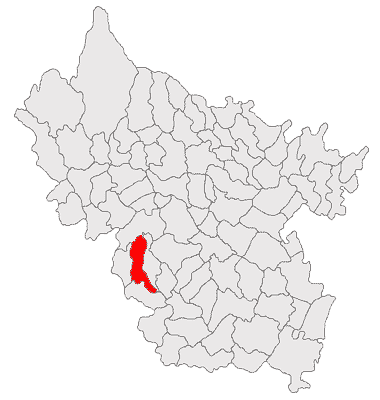
- Location in Buzău County

- Location in Romania
- Coordinates: 45°6′N 26°32′E
- Country: Romania
- County: Buzău
- Subdivisions: Bădești, Breaza, Greceanca, Văleanca-Vilănești, Vispești

Government
  - Mayor (2020–2024): Adrian Drugă (PSD)
- Area: 50.04 km^{2} (19.32 sq mi)
- Elevation: 331 m (1,086 ft)
- Population (2021-12-01): 2,474
  - Density: 49.44/km^{2} (128.1/sq mi)
- Time zone: UTC+02:00 (EET)
  - Summer (DST): UTC+03:00 (EEST)
- Postal code: 127105
- Area code: +(40) 238
- Vehicle reg.: BZ
- Website: www.primariabreazabz.ro

Breaza is a commune in Buzău County, Muntenia, Romania. It is composed of five villages: Bădeni, Breaza, Greceanca, Văleanca-Vilănești, and Vispești.

Historical population
Year	Pop.	±%
2002	3,175	—
2011	2,913	−8.3%
2021	2,474	−15.1%
Source: Census data
