= Ghergheasa =

- Commune
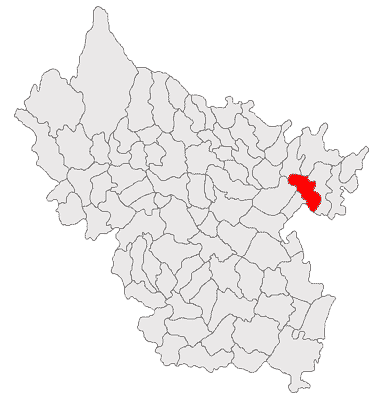
- Location in Buzău County

- Location in Romania
- Coordinates: 45°16′N 27°12′E
- Country: Romania
- County: Buzău
- Subdivisions: Ghergheasa, Sălcioara

Government
  - Mayor (2020–2024): Vasile Gheorghe (PSD)
- Area: 55.58 km^{2} (21.46 sq mi)
- Elevation: 51 m (167 ft)
- Population (2021-12-01): 2,166
  - Density: 38.97/km^{2} (100.9/sq mi)
- Time zone: EET/EEST (UTC+2/+3)
- Postal code: 127250
- Area code: +(40) 238
- Vehicle reg.: BZ
- Website: comunaghergheasa.ro

Ghergheasa is a commune in Buzău County, Muntenia, Romania. It is composed of two villages, Ghergheasa and Sălcioara.

Historical population
Year	Pop.	±%
2002	2,761	—
2011	2,493	−9.7%
2021	2,166	−13.1%
Source: Census data
