= Stâlpu =

- Commune
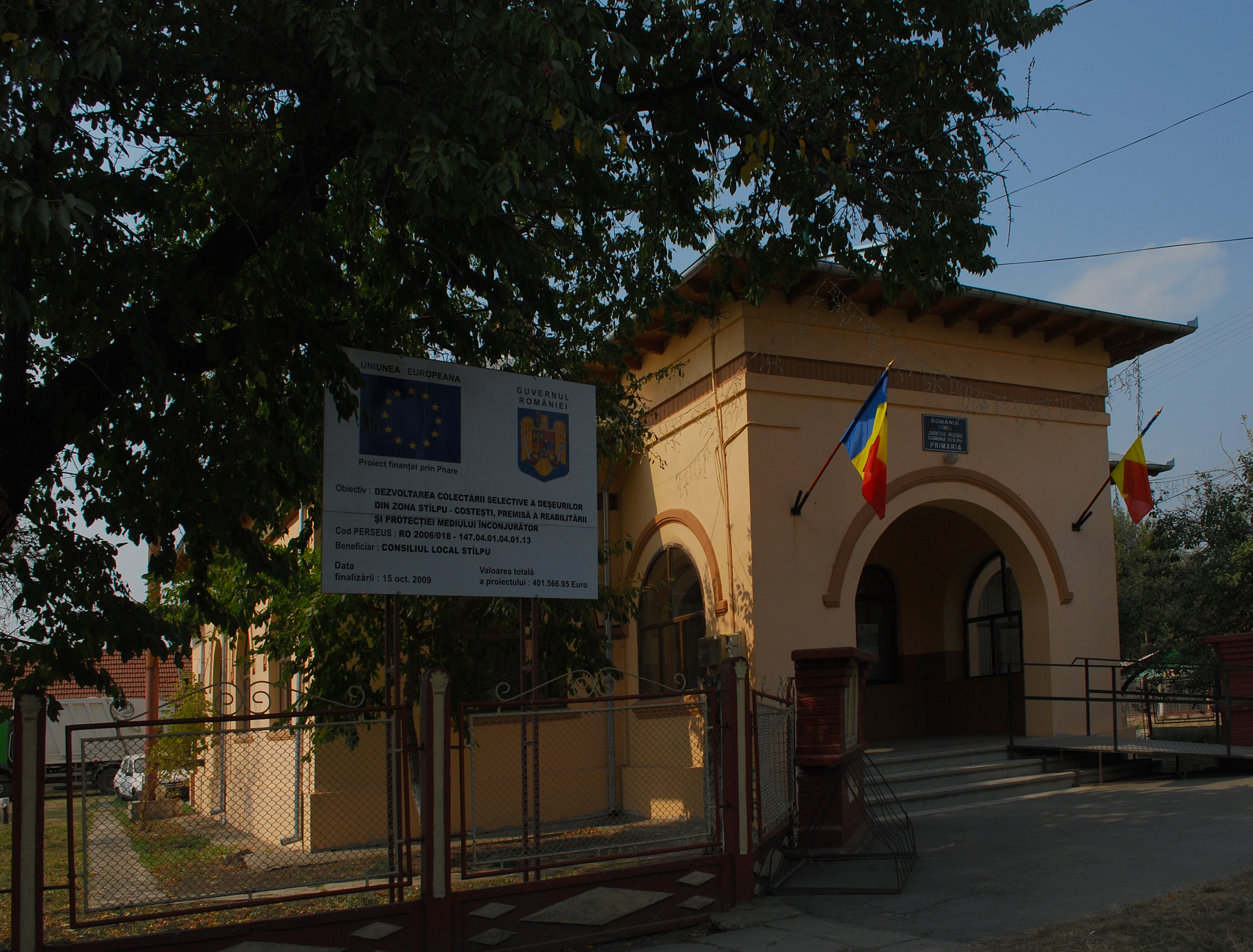
- Stâlpu town hall

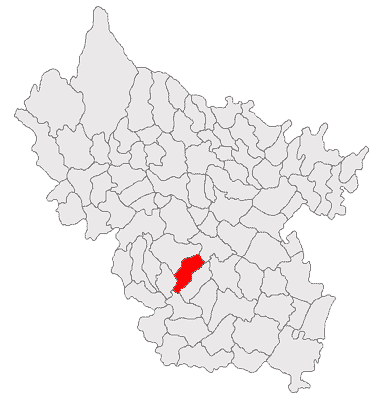
- Location in Buzău County

- Location in Romania
- Coordinates: 45°5′0″N 26°42′40″E
- Country: Romania
- County: Buzău

Government
  - Mayor (2020–2024): Stelian Gioabă (PSD)
- Area: 45.82 km^{2} (17.69 sq mi)
- Elevation: 86 m (282 ft)
- Population (2021-12-01): 3,033
  - Density: 66.19/km^{2} (171.4/sq mi)
- Time zone: UTC+02:00 (EET)
  - Summer (DST): UTC+03:00 (EEST)
- Postal code: 127605
- Area code: +(40) 238
- Vehicle reg.: BZ
- Website: primaria-stilpu.ro

Stâlpu is a commune in Buzău County, Muntenia, Romania. It is composed of a single village, Stâlpu.

Historical population
Year	Pop.	±%
2002	3,200	—
2011	3,193	−0.2%
2021	3,033	−5.0%
Source: Census data

== Notes ==
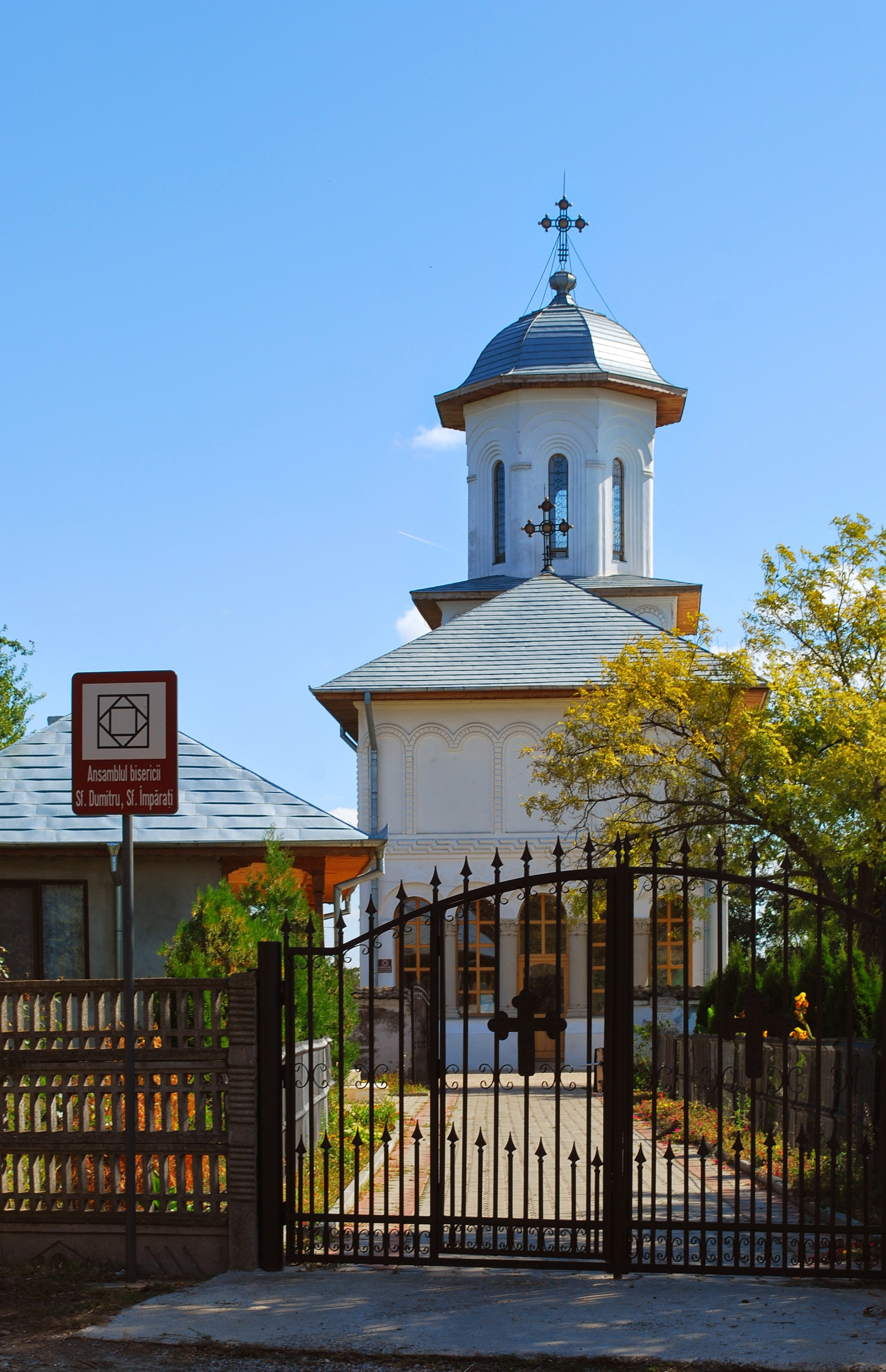
Church of Saint Demetrius and of the Holy Emperors Constantine and Helena in Stâlpu

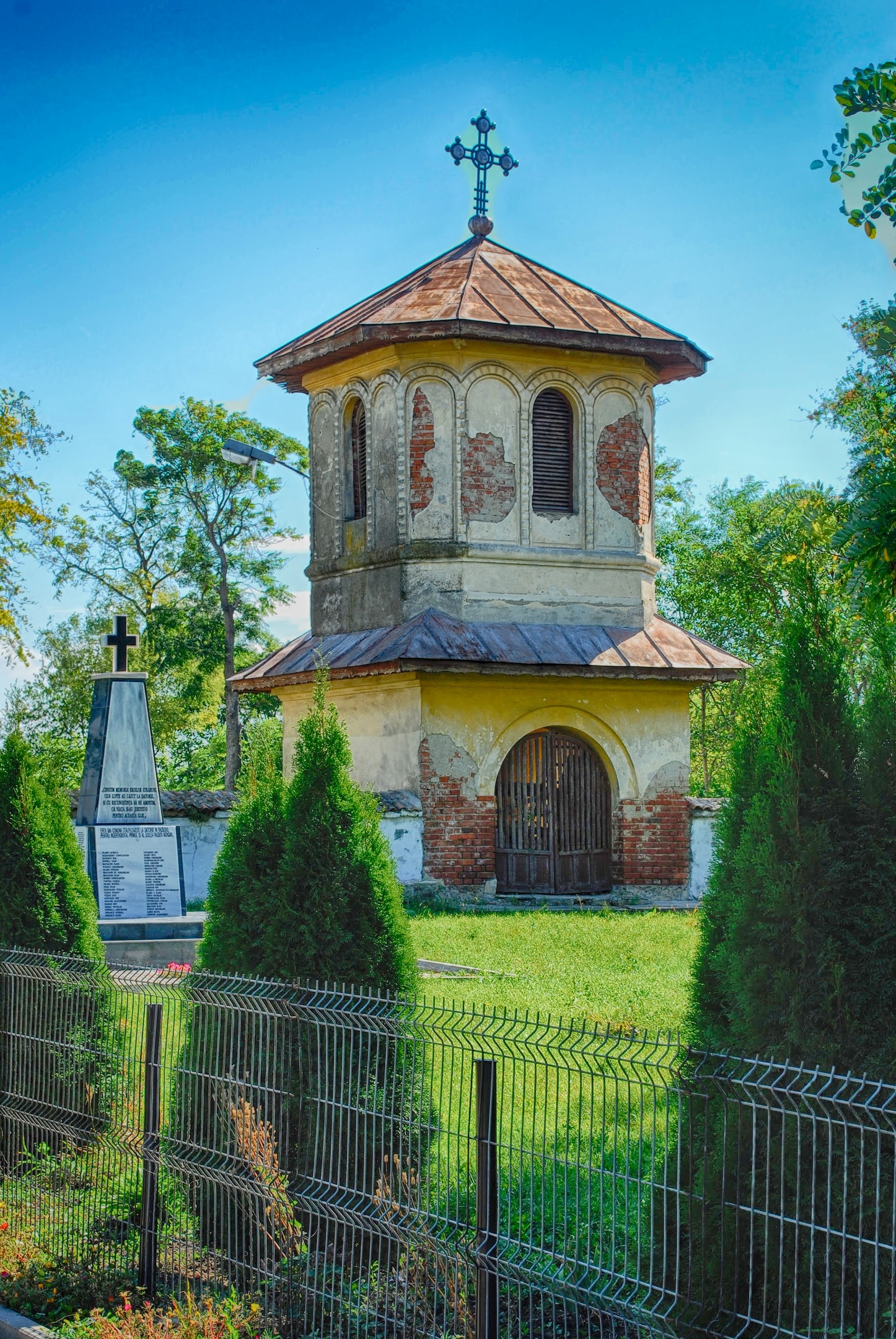
Bell tower of the church
