= Florica =

- Commune
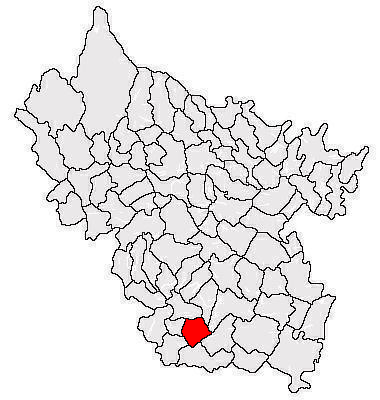
- Location in Buzău County

- Location in Romania
- Coordinates: 44°54′N 26°46′E
- Country: Romania
- County: Buzău

Government
  - Mayor (2020–2024): Ion Zaharia (PSD)
- Area: 44 km^{2} (17 sq mi)
- Elevation: 79 m (259 ft)
- Population (2021-12-01): 1,301
  - Density: 30/km^{2} (77/sq mi)
- Time zone: EET/EEST (UTC+2/+3)
- Postal code: 127535
- Area code: +(40) 238
- Vehicle reg.: BZ
- Website: www.comunaflorica.ro

Florica is a commune in Buzău County, Muntenia, Romania. It is composed of a single village, Florica.

Historical population
Year	Pop.	±%
2002	1,631	—
2011	1,597	−2.1%
2021	1,301	−18.5%
Source: Census data

== Natives ==
- Ion Gheorghe (1935–2021), poet
