= Bălăceanu =

- Commune
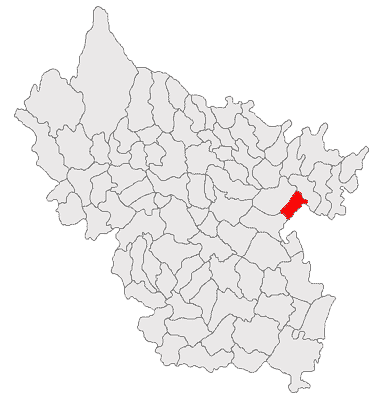
- Location in Buzău County

- Location in Romania
- Coordinates: 45°16′N 27°9′E
- Country: Romania
- County: Buzău

Government
  - Mayor (2020–2024): Gică Geangoș (PSD)
- Area: 33.42 km^{2} (12.90 sq mi)
- Elevation: 64 m (210 ft)
- Population (2021-12-01): 1,505
  - Density: 45/km^{2} (120/sq mi)
- Time zone: EET/EEST (UTC+2/+3)
- Postal code: 127020
- Area code: +(40) 238
- Vehicle reg.: BZ
- Website: primariabalaceanu.ro

Bălăceanu is a commune in Buzău County, Muntenia, Romania, with a population of 1,505 as of 2021. It is composed of a single village, Bălăceanu.

Most of the adult population work in agriculture. The village derives its name from a local landlord, Nicolae Bălăceanu, who lived in the early 20th century.

Historical population
Year	Pop.	±%
2002	1,796	—
2011	1,632	−9.1%
2021	1,505	−7.8%
Source: Census data
