= Mărgăritești =

- Commune
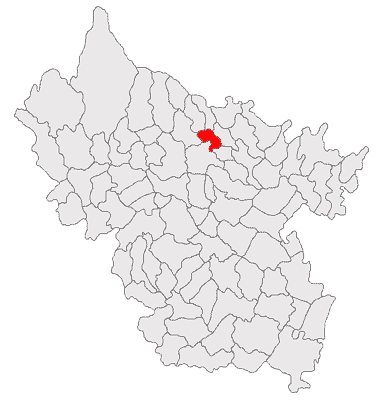
- Location in Buzău County

- Location in Romania
- Coordinates: 45°25′40″N 26°50′0″E
- Country: Romania
- County: Buzău
- Subdivisions: Câmpulungeanca, Fântânele, Mărgăritești

Government
  - Mayor (2020–2024): Fănel Ungureanu (PSD)
- Area: 22.3 km^{2} (8.6 sq mi)
- Elevation: 372 m (1,220 ft)
- Population (2021-12-01): 478
  - Density: 21.4/km^{2} (55.5/sq mi)
- Time zone: EET/EEST (UTC+2/+3)
- Postal code: 127330
- Area code: +(40) 238
- Vehicle reg.: BZ
- Website: margaritesti.ro

Mărgăritești is a commune in Buzău County, Muntenia, Romania. It is composed of three villages: Câmpulungeanca, Fântânele, and Mărgăritești.

Historical population
Year	Pop.	±%
2002	878	—
2011	697	−20.6%
2021	478	−31.4%
Source: Census data
