= Robeasca =

- Commune
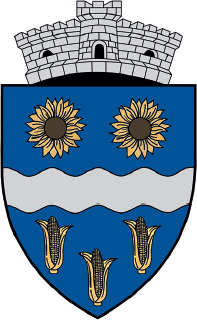
- Coat of arms

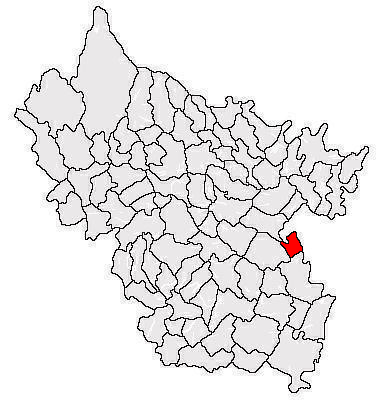
- Location in Buzău County

- Location in Romania
- Coordinates: 45°9′30″N 27°8′10″E
- Country: Romania
- County: Buzău
- Subdivisions: Moșești, Robeasca

Government
  - Mayor (2020–2024): Domnica Vlad (PSD)
- Area: 26.2 km^{2} (10.1 sq mi)
- Elevation: 57 m (187 ft)
- Population (2021-12-01): 936
  - Density: 35.7/km^{2} (92.5/sq mi)
- Time zone: EET/EEST (UTC+2/+3)
- Postal code: 127515
- Area code: +(40) 238
- Vehicle reg.: BZ
- Website: comunarobeasca.ro

Robeasca is a commune in Buzău County, Muntenia, Romania. It is composed of two villages, Moșești and Robeasca.

Historical population
Year	Pop.	±%
2002	1,308	—
2011	1,124	−14.1%
2021	936	−16.7%
Source: Census data
