= Brădeanu =

- Commune
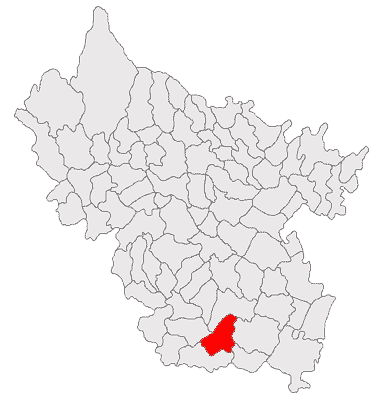
- Location in Buzău County

- Location in Romania
- Coordinates: 44°55′20″N 26°51′32″E
- Country: Romania
- County: Buzău
- Subdivisions: Brădeanu, Mitropolia, Smârdan

Government
  - Mayor (2024–2028): Violeta Preda (PNL)
- Area: 75.46 km^{2} (29.14 sq mi)
- Elevation: 78 m (256 ft)
- Population (2021-12-01): 2,077
  - Density: 28/km^{2} (71/sq mi)
- Time zone: EET/EEST (UTC+2/+3)
- Postal code: 127090
- Area code: +(40) 238
- Vehicle reg.: BZ
- Website: www.comuna-bradeanu.ro

Brădeanu is a commune in Buzău County, Muntenia, Romania. It is composed of three villages: Brădeanu, Mitropolia, and Smârdan.

The 22 hectares (54 acres) Brădeanu forest is the only pedunculate oak forest in Buzău County. It also features elms, wild pear trees and Tatar maples.

Historical population
Year	Pop.	±%
2002	2,922	—
2011	2,565	−12.2%
2021	2,077	−19.0%
Source: Census data
