= Scutelnici =

- Commune
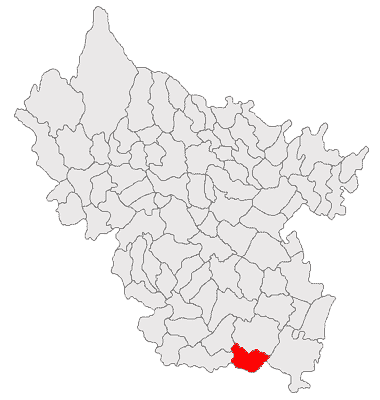
- Location in Buzău County

- Location in Romania
- Coordinates: 44°51′N 26°55′E
- Country: Romania
- County: Buzău
- Subdivisions: Arcanu, Brăgăreasa, Lipănescu, Scutelnici

Government
  - Mayor (2020–2024): Constantin Rusen (PNL)
- Area: 65.87 km^{2} (25.43 sq mi)
- Elevation: 71 m (233 ft)
- Population (2021-12-01): 1,979
  - Density: 30.04/km^{2} (77.81/sq mi)
- Time zone: EET/EEST (UTC+2/+3)
- Postal code: 127575
- Area code: +(40) 238
- Vehicle reg.: BZ
- Website: primariascutelnici.ro

See "Scutelnic" for the origin of the name.

Scutelnici is a commune in Buzău County, Muntenia, Romania. It is composed of four villages: Arcanu, Brăgăreasa, Lipănescu, and Scutelnici.

Historical population
Year	Pop.	±%
2002	2,645	—
2011	2,346	−11.3%
2021	1,979	−15.6%
Source: Census data
