= Poșta Câlnău =

- Commune
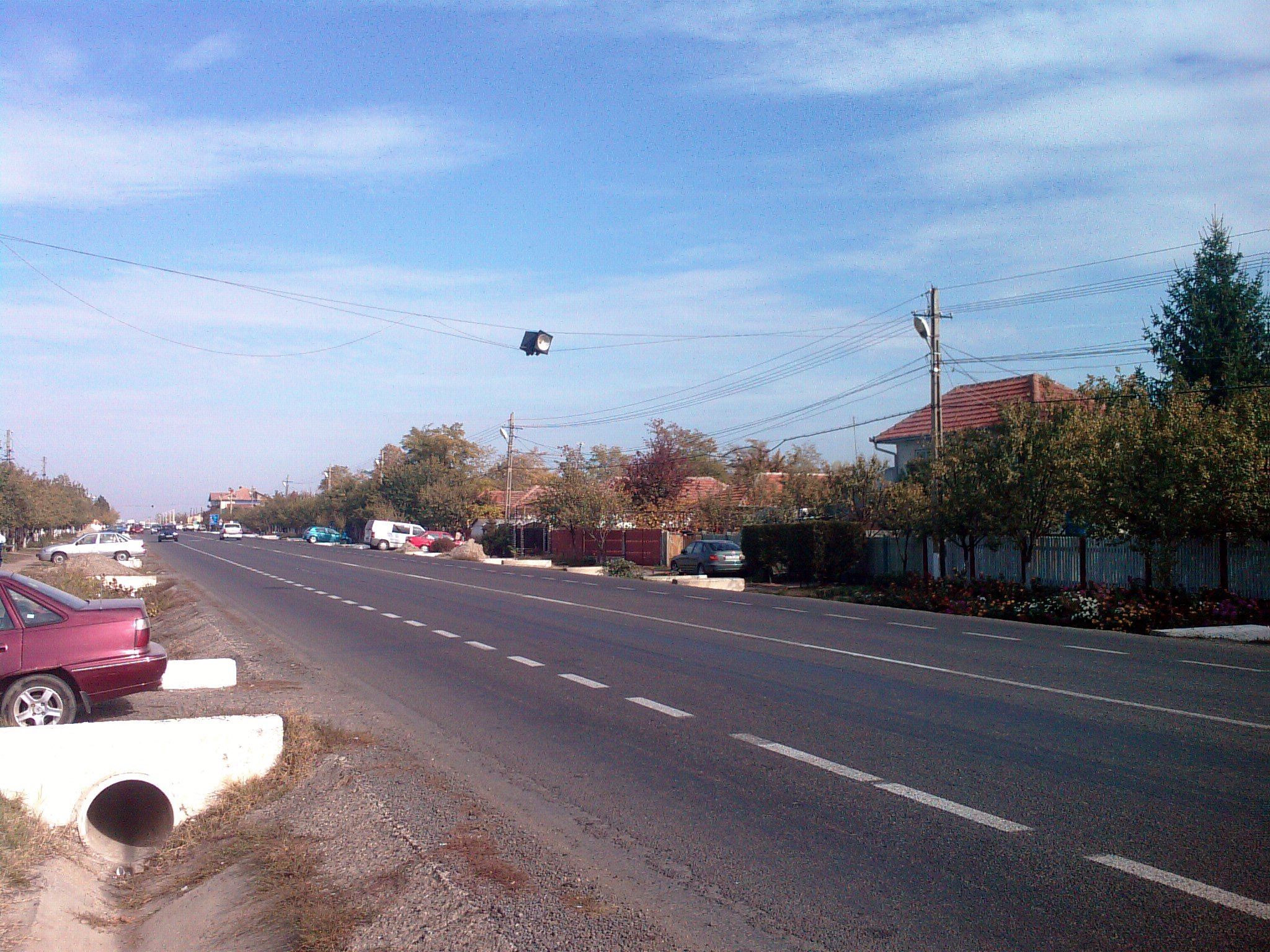
- National Road DN2 going through Poșta Câlnău

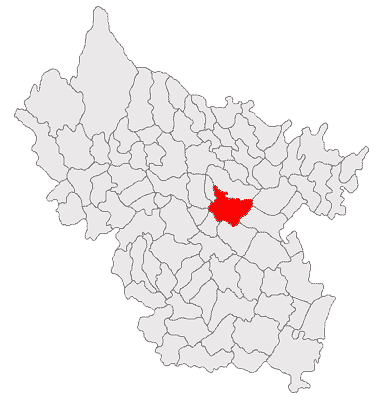
- Location in Buzău County

- Location in Romania
- Coordinates: 45°12′46″N 26°52′10″E
- Country: Romania
- County: Buzău
- Subdivisions: Aliceni, Coconari, Poșta Câlnău, Potârnichești, Sudiți, Zilișteanca

Government
  - Mayor (2020–2024): Sorin Munteanu (PSD)
- Area: 83.24 km^{2} (32.14 sq mi)
- Elevation: 141 m (463 ft)
- Population (2021-12-01): 5,542
  - Density: 66.58/km^{2} (172.4/sq mi)
- Time zone: UTC+02:00 (EET)
  - Summer (DST): UTC+03:00 (EEST)
- Postal code: 127485
- Area code: +(40) 238
- Vehicle reg.: BZ
- Website: www.comunapostacilnau.ro

Poșta Câlnău is a commune in Buzău County, Muntenia, Romania. It is composed of six villages: Aliceni, Coconari, Poșta Câlnău, Potârnichești, Sudiți, and Zilișteanca.

Historical population
Year	Pop.	±%
2002	6,071	—
2011	5,968	−1.7%
2021	5,542	−7.1%
Source: Census data
