= Săpoca =

- Commune
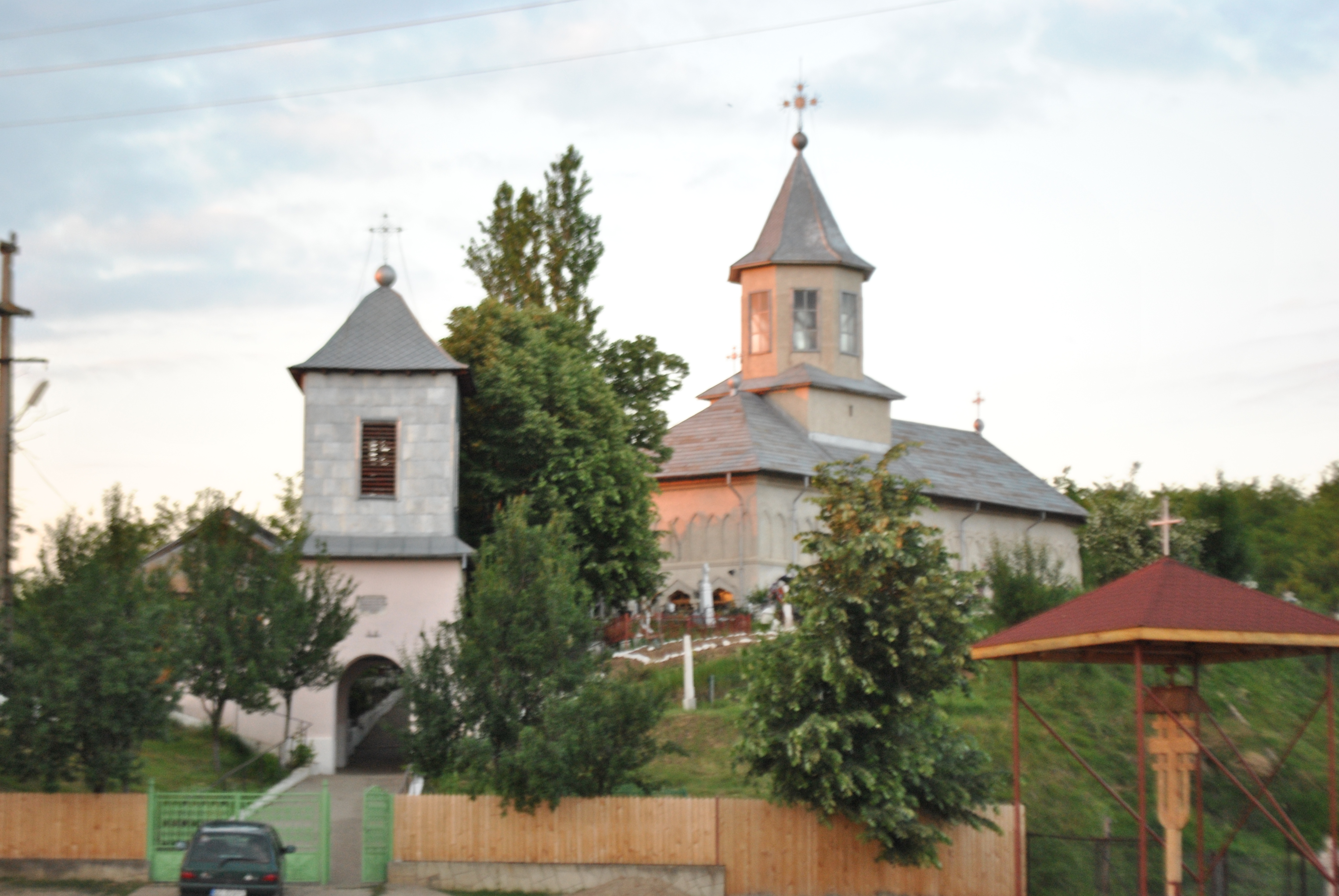
- Saints Constantine and Helena Church in Mătești

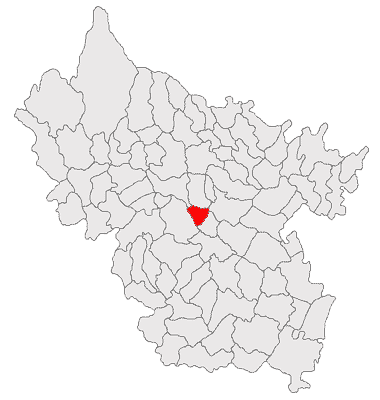
- Location in Buzău County

- Location in Romania
- Coordinates: 45°15′N 26°45′E
- Country: Romania
- County: Buzău
- Subdivisions: Mătești, Săpoca

Government
  - Mayor (2020–2024): Laurențiu Iulian Manea (PSD)
- Area: 25.78 km^{2} (9.95 sq mi)
- Elevation: 134 m (440 ft)
- Population (2021-12-01): 3,391
  - Density: 131.5/km^{2} (340.7/sq mi)
- Time zone: UTC+02:00 (EET)
  - Summer (DST): UTC+03:00 (EEST)
- Postal code: 127540
- Area code: +(40) 238
- Vehicle reg.: BZ
- Website: primariasapoca.ro

Săpoca is a commune in Buzău County, Muntenia, Romania. It is composed of two villages, Mătești and Săpoca.

It is the site of a psychiatric hospital established in 1960.

Historical population
Year	Pop.	±%
2002	3,210	—
2011	3,305	+3.0%
2021	3,391	+2.6%
Source: Census data
