= Gălbinași, Buzău =

Gălbinași
- Commune
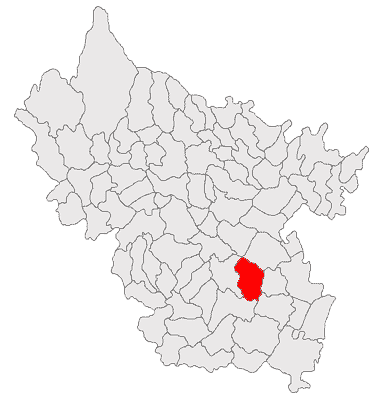
- Location in Buzău County

- Location in Romania
- Coordinates: 45°4′41″N 26°56′08″E
- Country: Romania
- County: Buzău
- Subdivisions: Bentu, Gălbinași, Tăbărăști

Government
  - Mayor (2020–2024): Dumitru Dragomir (PSD)
- Area: 77.10 km^{2} (29.77 sq mi)
- Elevation: 78 m (256 ft)
- Population (2021-12-01): 4,208
  - Density: 54.58/km^{2} (141.4/sq mi)
- Time zone: EET/EEST (UTC+2/+3)
- Postal code: 127240
- Area code: +(40) 238
- Vehicle reg.: BZ
- Website: comunagalbinasi.ro

Gălbinași is a commune in Buzău County, Muntenia, Romania. It is composed of three villages: Bentu, Gălbinași, and Tăbărăști.

Historical population
Year	Pop.	±%
2002	4,067	—
2011	4,116	+1.2%
2021	4,208	+2.2%
Source: Census data
