= Glodeanu Sărat =

- Commune
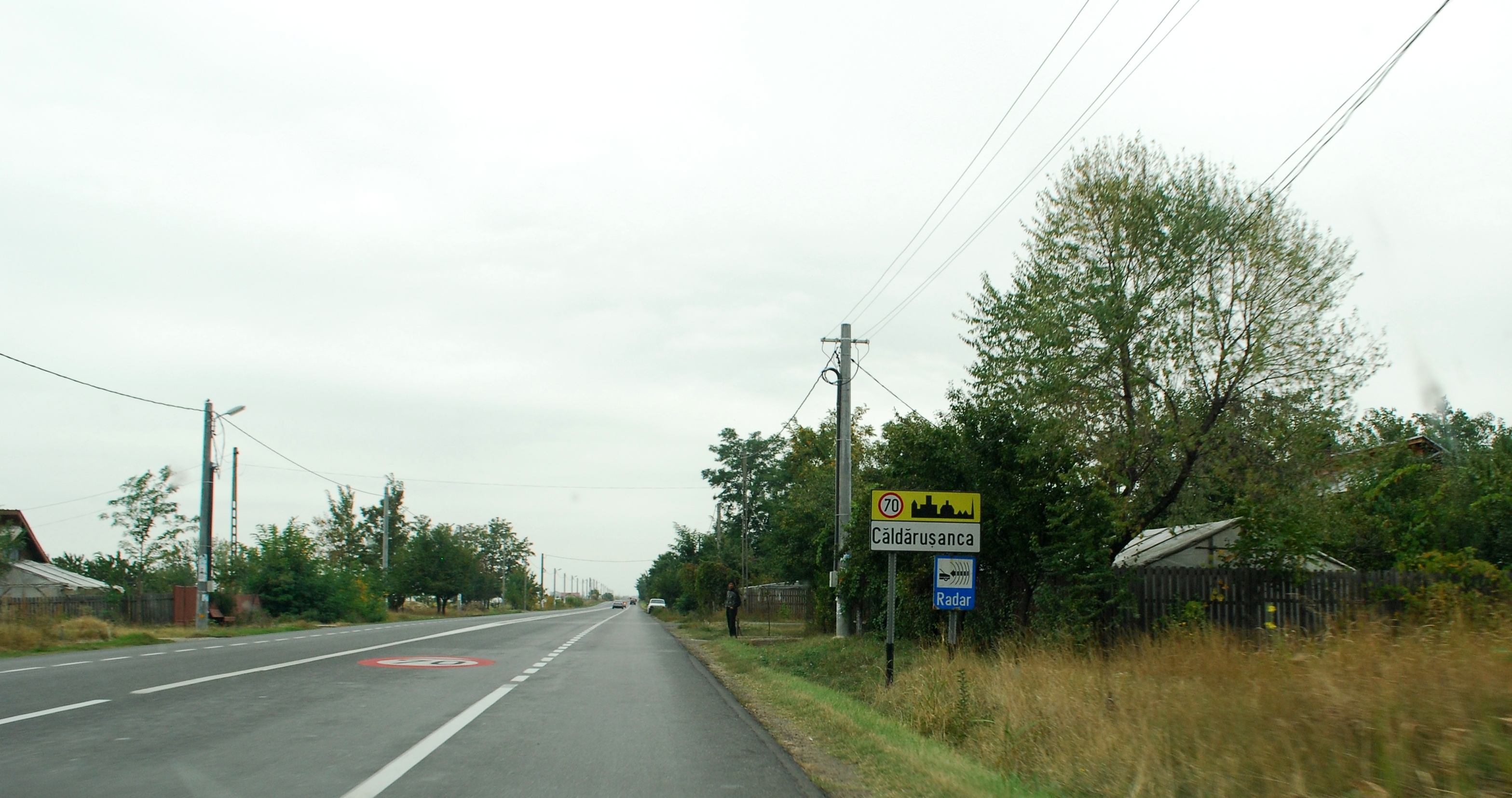
- DN2 entering Căldărușanca

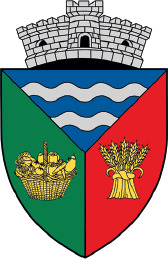
- Coat of arms

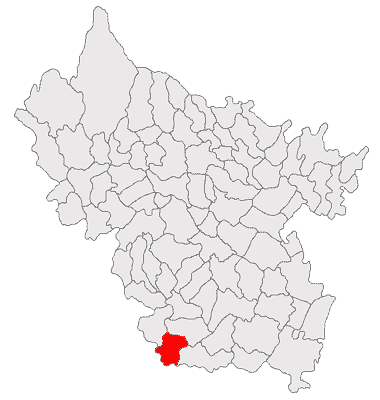
- Location in Buzău County

- Location in Romania
- Coordinates: 44°52′N 26°39′E
- Country: Romania
- County: Buzău
- Subdivisions: Căldărușanca, Glodeanu Sărat, Ileana, Pitulicea

Government
  - Mayor (2020–2024): Neculai Stoica (PSD)
- Area: 59.02 km^{2} (22.79 sq mi)
- Elevation: 61 m (200 ft)
- Population (2021-12-01): 3,730
  - Density: 63.2/km^{2} (164/sq mi)
- Time zone: UTC+02:00 (EET)
  - Summer (DST): UTC+03:00 (EEST)
- Postal code: 127255
- Area code: +(40) 238
- Vehicle reg.: BZ
- Website: www.primariaglodeanusarat.ro

Glodeanu Sărat is a commune in Buzău County, Muntenia, Romania. It is composed of four villages: Căldărușanca, Glodeanu Sărat, Ileana, and Pitulicea.

Historical population
Year	Pop.	±%
2002	4,762	—
2011	4,469	−6.2%
2021	3,730	−16.5%
Source: Census data
