= Trestia =

Trestia may refer to several villages in Romania:

- Trestia, a village in Cozieni Commune, Buzău County
- Trestia, a village in Băiţa Commune, Hunedoara County
- Trestia, a village in Cernești Commune, Maramureș County
- Trestia, a village in Hida Commune, Sălaj County
- Trestia, a village in Dumitrești Commune, Vrancea County

and to several rivers in Romania:

- Trestia, a tributary of the Almaș in Sălaj County
- Trestia, a tributary of the Bogata in Brașov County
- Trestia, a tributary of the Cașoca in Buzău County
- Trestia, a tributary of the Valea Lupului in Sibiu County
