= Urlătoarea =

Urlătoarea may refer to the following rivers in Romania:

- Urlătoarea, a tributary of the Crasna in Buzău County
- Urlătoarea, a tributary of the Pănicel in Brașov County
- Urlătoarea (Prahova), a tributary of the Prahova in Prahova County

== See also ==
- Urlătoarea Mare River (disambiguation)
- Urlătoarea Mică River (disambiguation)
