= Bălăneasa (Buzău) =

- Location within Romania

Location
- Country: Romania
- Counties: Buzău County

Physical characteristics
- Source: Ivănețu Ridge
  - location: Brătilești
  - elevation: 1,191 m (3,907 ft)
- Mouth: Buzău
  - coordinates: 45.2803°N 26.5733°E
- Length: 31 km (19 mi)
- Basin size: 190 km^{2} (73 sq mi)

Basin features
- Progression: Buzău→ Siret→ Danube→ Black Sea

The Bălăneasa is a left tributary of the river Buzău in Romania. It discharges into the Buzău near Pârscov. The following villages are situated along the river Bălăneasa, from source to mouth: Brătilești, Brăești, Valea Fântânei, Bozioru, Bălănești, Cozieni, Trestia, Lunca Frumoasă and Pârscov. Its length is 31 km (19 mi) and its basin size is 190 km^{2} (73 sq mi).

== Tributaries ==
The following rivers are tributaries to the river Bălăneasa:

- Left: Valea Rea, Murătoarea
- Right: Izvorul Călugărului, Gârla Fișicilor, Roata, Nucu
