= Beciul =

Beciul Băligoasa
- Location within Romania

Location
- Country: Romania
- Counties: Buzău County
- Villages: Beciu, Scorțoasa

Physical characteristics
- Mouth: Sărățel
  - location: Scorțoasa
  - coordinates: 45.3460°N 26.6668°E
- Length: 9 km (5.6 mi)
- Basin size: 35 km^{2} (14 sq mi)

Basin features
- Progression: Sărățel→ Buzău→ Siret→ Danube→ Black Sea

The Beciul or Băligoasa is a left tributary of the river Sărățel in Romania. It flows into the Sărățel in Scorțoasa. Its length is 9 km (5.6 mi) and its basin size is 35 km^{2} (14 sq mi).
