= Urlătoarea Mare River =

Urlătoarea Mare River may refer to:

- Urlătoarea Mare, a tributary of the Buzău in Brașov County, Romania
- Urlătoarea Mare, a tributary of the Urlătoarea in Prahova County, Romania

== See also ==
- Urlătoarea River (disambiguation)
