= Urlătoarea Mică River =

Urlătoarea Mică River may refer to:

- Urlătoarea Mică, a tributary of the Buzău in Brașov County, Romania
- Urlătoarea Mică, a tributary of the Urlătoarea in Prahova County, Romania

== See also ==
- Urlătoarea River (disambiguation)
