= Sărățel (Buzău) =

- Location within Romania

Location
- Country: Romania
- Counties: Buzău County
- Villages: Budești, Cănești, Scorțoasa, Joseni

Physical characteristics
- Mouth: Buzău
  - location: Berca
  - coordinates: 45.2862°N 26.6759°E
- Length: 32 km (20 mi)
- Basin size: 187 km^{2} (72 sq mi)

Basin features
- Progression: Buzău→ Siret→ Danube→ Black Sea
- Tributaries
  - left: Slănicel, Gura Văii, Beciul
  - right: Strâmbul

The Sărățel is a left tributary of the river Buzău in Romania. It discharges into the Buzău in Berca. Its length is 32 km (20 mi) and its basin size is 187 km^{2} (72 sq mi).
