= Hârboca =

- Location within Romania

Location
- Country: Romania
- Counties: Buzău County
- Villages: Fântânele, Vadu Sorești

Physical characteristics
- Source: Mărgăritești
  - coordinates: 45°26′36″N 26°50′38″E
  - elevation: 437 m (1,434 ft)
- Mouth: Câlnău
  - location: Vadu Sorești
  - coordinates: 45°18′24″N 26°52′36″E
  - elevation: 251 m (823 ft)
- Length: 18 km (11 mi)
- Basin size: 65 km^{2} (25 sq mi)

Basin features
- Progression: Câlnău→ Buzău→ Siret→ Danube→ Black Sea
- Tributaries
  - right: Fântânele, Șipoi, Pruneni

The Hârboca is a right tributary of the river Câlnău in Romania. It flows into the Câlnău in Vadu Sorești. Its length is 18 km (11 mi) and its basin size is 65 km^{2} (25 sq mi).
