= Câlnău (Buzău) =

Câlnău Salcia
- Location within Romania

Location
- Country: Romania
- Counties: Buzău County

Physical characteristics
- Source: Vaca Rea Hill
  - coordinates: 45°32′30″N 26°45′37″E
  - elevation: 730 m (2,400 ft)
- Mouth: Buzău
  - location: Gura Câlnăului
  - coordinates: 45°10′12″N 26°50′2″E
  - elevation: 84 m (276 ft)
- Length: 57 km (35 mi)
- Basin size: 208 km^{2} (80 sq mi)

Basin features
- Progression: Buzău→ Siret→ Danube→ Black Sea
- Tributaries
  - right: Hârboca

The Câlnău is a left tributary of the river Buzău in Romania. It discharges into the Buzău in Gura Câlnăului, near the city Buzău. Its length is 57 km (35 mi) and its basin size is 208 km^{2} (80 sq mi). The upper reach of the river is also known as Salcia. The following villages are situated along the river Câlnău, from source to mouth: Valea Salciei, Modreni, Costomiru, Batogu, Murgești, Racovițeni, Petrișoru, Vadu Sorești, Fundeni, Zărnești, Sudiți, Coconari, Aliceni, Zilișteanca, Poșta Câlnău, Potârnichești and Gura Câlnăului.

== Tributaries ==
The following rivers are tributaries to the river Câlnău:

- Left: Costomiru, Valea lui Lalu, Iernatic, Valea Șchiopului, Chiperu, Rața
- Right: Chiperișteni, Hârboca, Ghizdita, Cheia
