= Cremenea =

Cremenea may refer to several villages in Romania:

- Cremenea, a village in Gherăseni Commune, Buzău County
- Cremenea, a village in Bobâlna Commune, Cluj County
- Cremenea, a village in Tâmna Commune, Mehedinţi County
- Cremenea River
- Cremenea Mare River
- Cremenea Branch of Danube
