= Pârâul Porcului =

Pârâul Porcului may refer to:

- Pârâul Porcului (Bâsculiţa)
- Pârâul Porcului, a tributary of the Dălghiu in Brașov County
- Pârâul Porcului, a tributary of the Putna in Vrancea County
