= Brăești =

Brăești may refer to several places in Romania:

- Brăești, Botoșani, a commune in Botoșani County
- Brăești, Iași, a commune in Iași County
- Brăești, Buzău, a commune in Buzău County
