= Buzoel =

- Location within Romania

Location
- Country: Romania
- Counties: Buzău, Brăila
- Villages: C. A. Rosetti, Făurei, Surdila-Găiseanca

Physical characteristics
- Mouth: Buzău
  - location: Dedulești
  - coordinates: 45.1552°N 27.3770°E
- Length: 23 km (14 mi)
- Basin size: 53 km^{2} (20 sq mi)

Basin features
- Progression: Buzău→ Siret→ Danube→ Black Sea

The Buzoel is a right tributary of the river Buzău in Romania. It discharges into the Buzău near Câineni-Băi. Its length is 23 km (14 mi) and its basin size is 53 km^{2} (20 sq mi).
