= Bogoda =

Bogoda may refer to:

- Bogoda Bleeker, 1853, a genus of fishes in the family Ambassidae, synonym of Chanda
- Bogoda Blyth, 1860, a genus of fishes in the family Priacanthidae, synonym of Priacanthus
- Bogoda, a settlement in Kurunegala District, Sri Lanka
- Bogoda Seelawimala Thera, a Buddhist priest, who is the current Chief Sangha Nayaka of Great Britain
- Bogoda Wooden Bridge, the oldest surviving wooden bridge in Sri Lanka

== See also ==
- Bogota (disambiguation)
