= Valea Boului (Buzău) =

Valea Boului Bătrâna
- Location within Romania

Location
- Country: Romania
- Counties: Buzău, Brăila
- Villages: Costieni, Ziduri, Bălăceanu, Galbenu, Jirlău

Physical characteristics
- Mouth: Buzău
  - location: Vișani
  - coordinates: 45.1518°N 27.2949°E
- Length: 53 km (33 mi)
- Basin size: 420 km^{2} (160 sq mi)

Basin features
- Progression: Buzău→ Siret→ Danube→ Black Sea
- Tributaries
  - left: Sinești
  - right: Cochirleanca

The Valea Boului (also known as Bătrâna) is a left tributary of the river Buzău in Romania. It discharges into the Buzău in Vișani. Its length is 53 km (33 mi) and its basin size is 420 km^{2} (160 sq mi). It flows through Lake Jirlău.
