= Bogata =

Bogotá is the capital of Colombia.

Bogata or Bøgata may refer to:

== Places ==
=== Romania ===
- Bogata, Mureș, a commune in Mureș County
- Bogata, a village in Dofteana Commune, Bacău County
- Bogata, a village in Călărași Commune, Cluj County
- Bogata, a village in Grădiştea Commune, Călăraşi County
- Bogata, a village in Baia Commune, Suceava County

=== United States ===
- Bogata, Texas, a city in Red River County

== Rivers ==
=== Romania ===
- Bogata, a tributary of the Moldova in Suceava County
- Bogata (Olt), a left tributary of the Olt in Brașov County
- Bogata, an alternative name for the Vad, a tributary of the Someș in Cluj County

== Other uses ==
- Bøgata, a street in Oslo, Norway
- Oleksandra Bogata, a Ukrainian swimmer in the 2003 World Aquatics Championships
- Bogata, an early locomotive on the Panama Canal Railway

== See also ==
- Bogota (disambiguation)
