= Bercești =

Berceşti may refer to several villages in Romania:

- Berceşti, a village in Cozieni Commune, Buzău County
- Berceşti, a village in the town of Novaci, Gorj County
