= Pascu =

Pascu may refer to:

== Persons ==
- Ana Derșidan-Ene-Pascu (1944–2022), Romanian fencer and sport leader
- Ioan Mircea Pașcu (born 1949), Romanian politician
- Bianca Pascu (born 1988), a Romanian sabre fencer
- Pascu (footballer) (born 2000), Spanish footballer

== Places ==
- Pascu, a tributary of the river Harțagu in Romania
