= Lădăuți =

Tributary of the river Buzău in Romania

- Location within Romania

Location
- Country: Romania
- Counties: Covasna County
- Villages: Lădăuți, Barcani

Physical characteristics
- Source: Curvature Carpathians
- Mouth: Buzău
  - coordinates: 45.6654°N 26.0666°E
- Length: 11 km (6.8 mi)
- Basin size: 98 km^{2} (38 sq mi)

Basin features
- Progression: Buzău→ Siret→ Danube→ Black Sea
- Tributaries
  - left: Barcani
  - right: Bărbat

The Lădăuți is a left tributary of the river Buzău in Romania. It discharges into the Buzău near Sita Buzăului. Its length is 11 km (6.8 mi) and its basin size is 98 km^{2} (38 sq mi).
