= Brăești, Buzău =

Brăești
- Commune
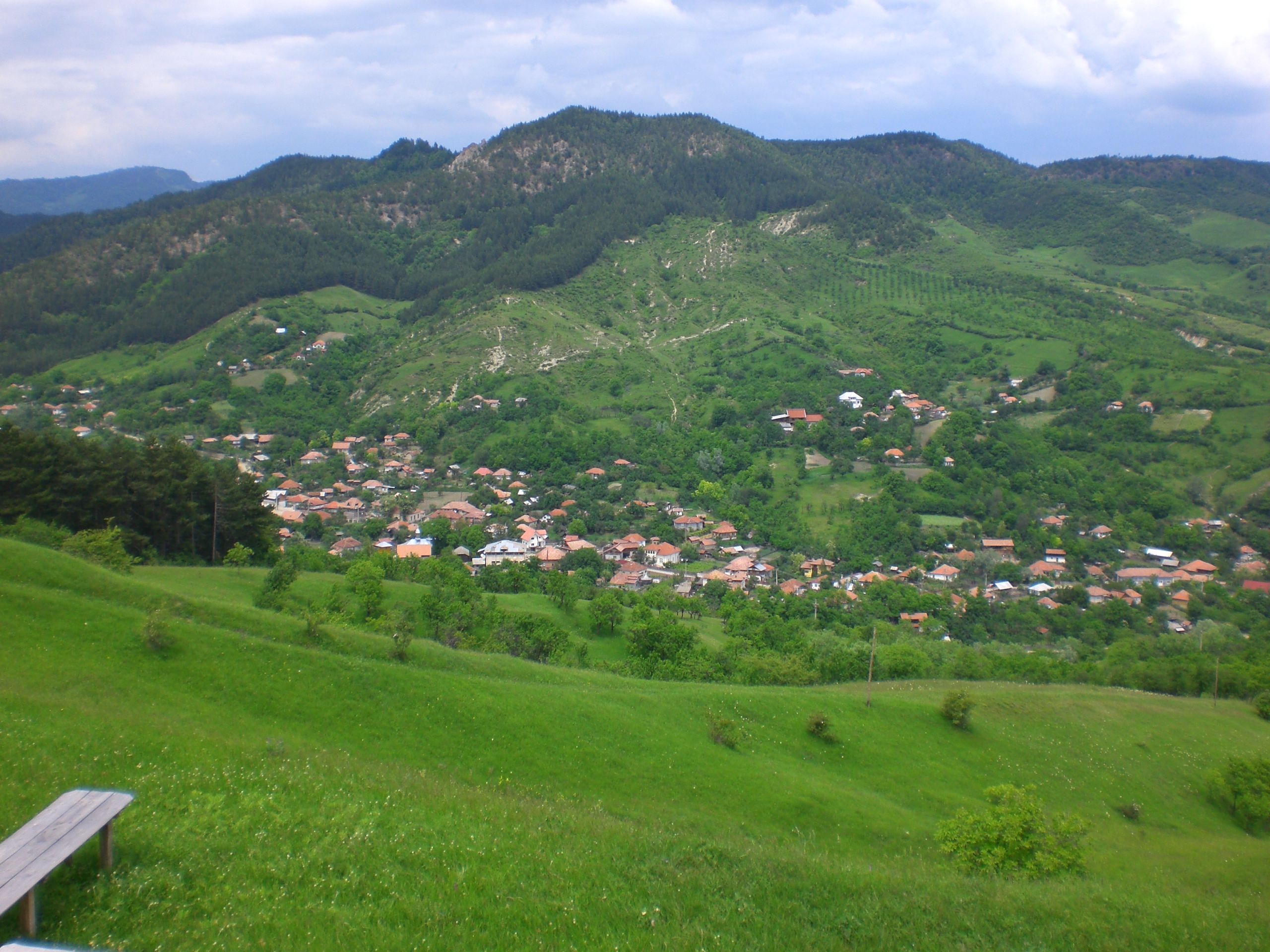
- View of Brăești village

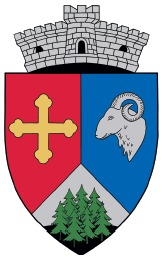
- Coat of arms

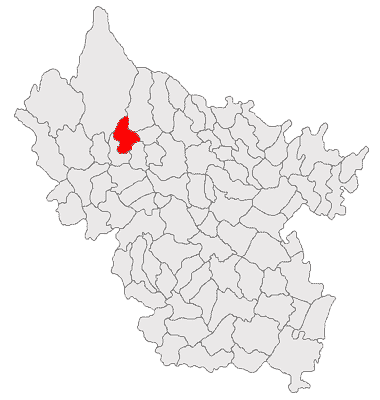
- Location in Buzău County

- Location in Romania
- Coordinates: 45°26′N 26°30′E
- Country: Romania
- County: Buzău
- Subdivisions: Brăești, Brătilești, Goidești, Ivănețu, Pârscovelu, Pinu, Ruginoasa

Government
  - Mayor (2020–2024): Gheorghe Negoiță (PSD)
- Area: 46.7 km^{2} (18.0 sq mi)
- Elevation: 466 m (1,529 ft)
- Population (2021-12-01): 2,057
  - Density: 44.0/km^{2} (114/sq mi)
- Time zone: UTC+02:00 (EET)
  - Summer (DST): UTC+03:00 (EEST)
- Postal code: 127095
- Area code: +(40) 238
- Vehicle reg.: BZ
- Website: braesti-buzau.ro

Brăești is a commune in Buzău County, Muntenia, Romania. It is composed of seven villages: Brăești, Brătilești, Goidești, Ivănețu, Pinu, Pârscovelu, and Ruginoasa.

The commune is traversed by the river Bălăneasa. Brăești borders the following communes: Chiliile to the east, Odăile to the south, Bozioru to the south-west, Gura Teghii to the north-west, and Lopătari to the north-east.

Located nearby is Pinul Monastery, which was built in 1647–1648, during the reign of Matei Basarab.

Historical population
Year	Pop.	±%
2002	2,528	—
2011	2,399	−5.1%
2021	2,057	−14.3%
Source: Census data
