= Bălăneasa =

Bălăneasa may refer to the following places in Romania:

- Bălăneasa, a village in the commune Livezi, Bacău County
- Bălăneasa, a tributary of the Bârlad in Vaslui and Galați Counties
- Bălăneasa (Buzău), a tributary of the Buzău in Buzău County
