= Batogu =

Batogu may refer to several villages in Romania:

- Batogu, a village in Cireşu Commune, Brăila County
- Batogu, a village in Murgești Commune, Buzău County
