= Dălghiu =

- Location within Romania

Location
- Country: Romania
- Counties: Brașov County
- Villages: Dălghiu

Physical characteristics
- Source: Ciucaș Mountains
- Mouth: Buzău
  - coordinates: 45.5781°N 25.9810°E
- Length: 17 km (11 mi)
- Basin size: 51 km^{2} (20 sq mi)

Basin features
- Progression: Buzău→ Siret→ Danube→ Black Sea
- Tributaries
  - left: Dălghiaș
  - right: Pârâul Porcului

The Dălghiu is a left tributary of the river Buzău in Romania. It discharges into the Buzău upstream from Vama Buzăului. Its length is 17 km (11 mi) and its basin size is 51 km^{2} (20 sq mi).
