= Valea Salciei =

- Commune
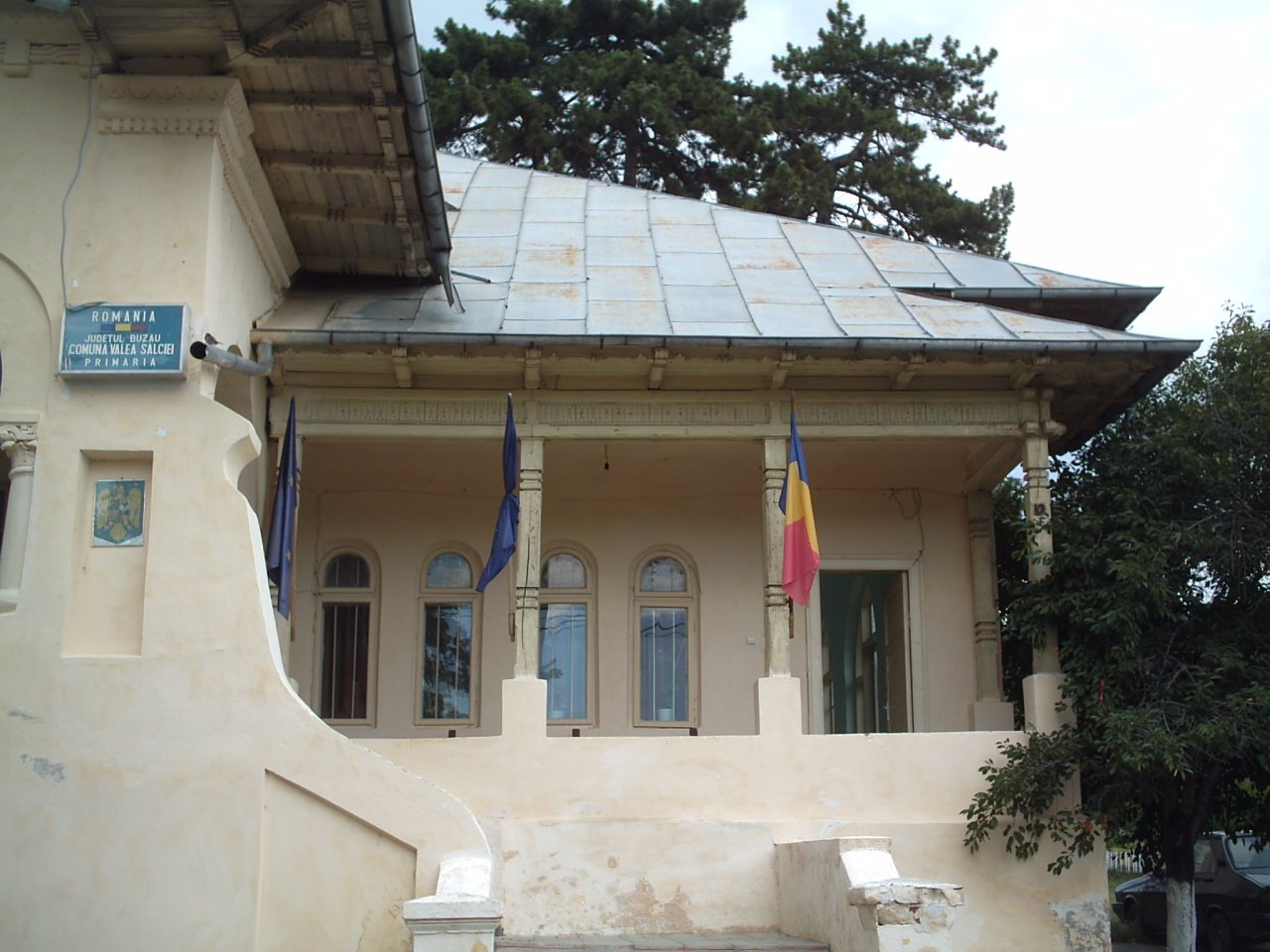
- Valea Salciei town hall

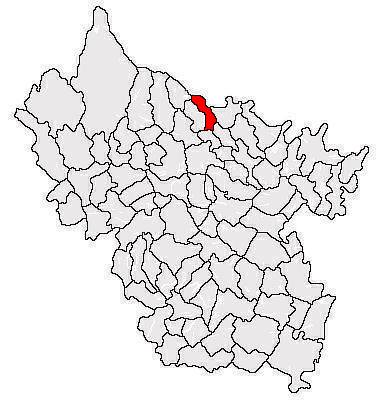
- Location in Buzău County

- Location in Romania
- Coordinates: 45°29′40″N 26°49′30″E
- Country: Romania
- County: Buzău
- Subdivisions: Modreni, Valea Salciei, Valea Salciei-Cătun

Government
  - Mayor (2020–2024): Marian Mușat (PSD)
- Area: 32.3 km^{2} (12.5 sq mi)
- Elevation: 378 m (1,240 ft)
- Population (2021-12-01): 529
  - Density: 16.4/km^{2} (42.4/sq mi)
- Time zone: UTC+02:00 (EET)
  - Summer (DST): UTC+03:00 (EEST)
- Postal code: 127665
- Area code: +(40) 238
- Vehicle reg.: BZ
- Website: www.comuna-valeasalciei.ro

Valea Salciei is a commune in Buzău County, Muntenia, Romania. It is composed of three villages: Modreni, Valea Salciei, and Valea Salciei-Cătun.

The commune lies in the foothills of the Curvature Carpathians, on the banks of the river Câlnău, which has its source here. It is located 48 km (30 mi) north of the county seat, Buzău, on the border with Vrancea County.

Historical population
Year	Pop.	±%
2002	870	—
2011	776	−10.8%
2021	529	−31.8%
Source: Census data
