= Sita Buzăului =

Commune in Covasna County, Romania

- Commune
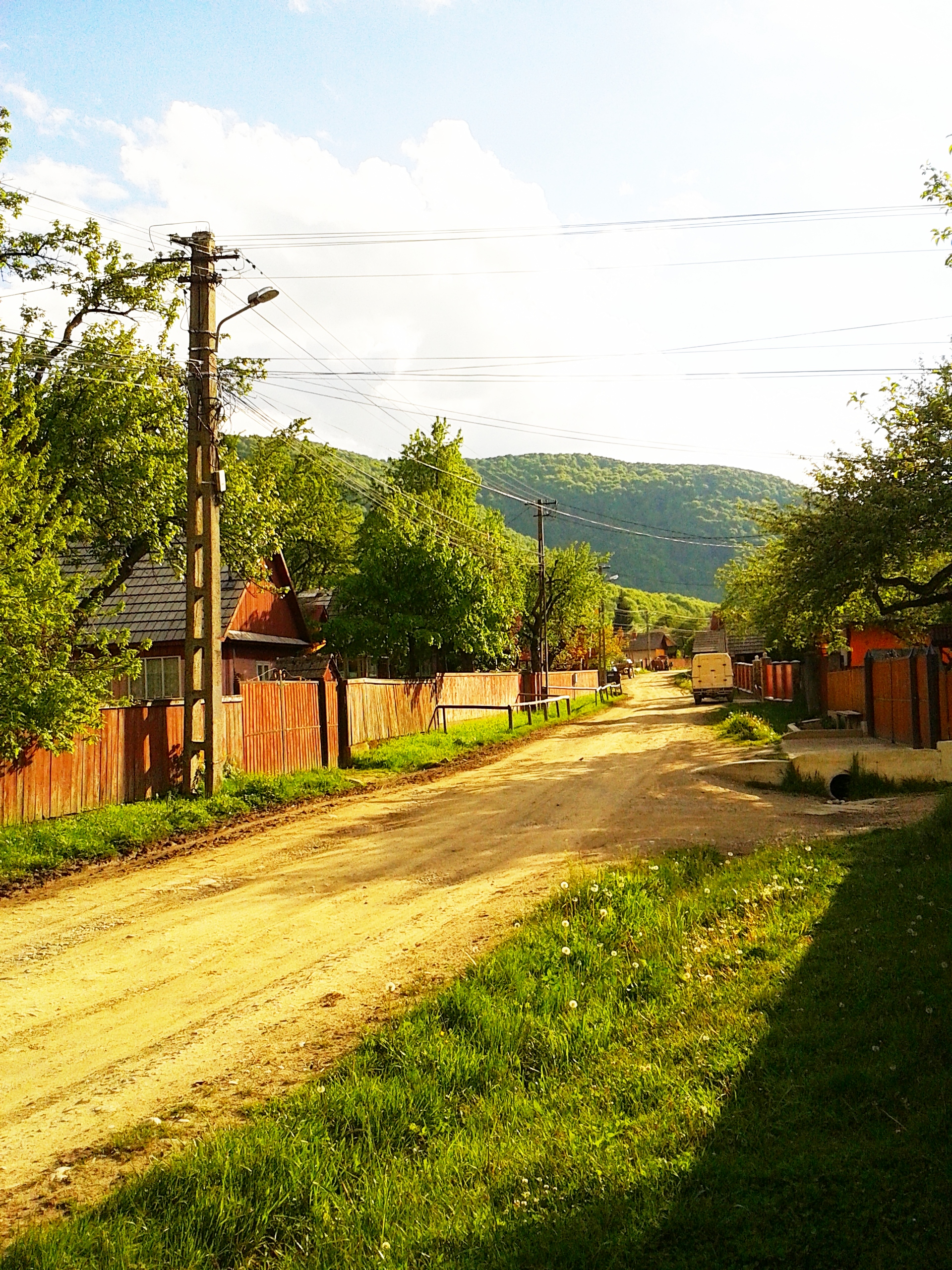
- View from Crasna

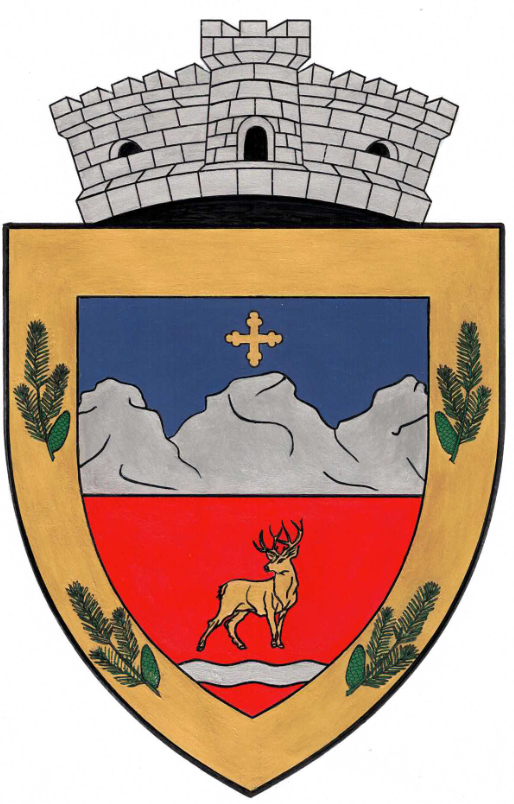
- Coat of arms

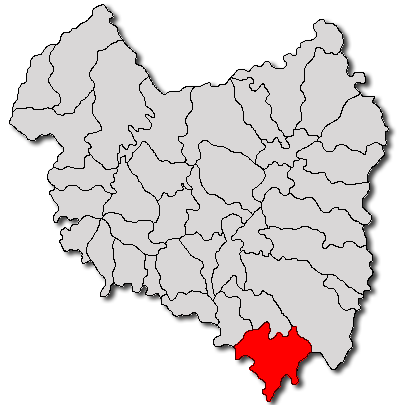
- Location in Covasna County

- Location in Romania
- Coordinates: 45°39′N 26°4′E
- Country: Romania
- County: Covasna

Government
  - Mayor (2020–2024): Nicolae Stoica (Ind.)
- Area: 147.53 km^{2} (56.96 sq mi)
- Elevation: 689 m (2,260 ft)
- Population (2021-12-01): 4,722
  - Density: 32.01/km^{2} (82.90/sq mi)
- Time zone: UTC+02:00 (EET)
  - Summer (DST): UTC+03:00 (EEST)
- Postal code: 527155
- Area code: (+40) 02 67
- Vehicle reg.: CV
- Website: ro.sita-buzaului.ro

Sita Buzăului (Hungarian: Szitabodza) is a commune in Covasna County, in the geographical region of Transylvania, Romania. It is composed of four villages: Crasna (Bodzakraszna), Merișor (Almás), Sita Buzăului, and Zăbrătău (Zabrató).

== Geography ==
The commune is located at the southern extremity of Covasna County, 42 km (26 mi) southeast of the county seat, Sfântu Gheorghe, on the border with Brașov and Buzău counties. It is situated at an altitude of 689 m (2,260 ft), on the banks of the Buzău River and its tributaries, the Crasna and the Harțag.

Sita Buzăului is crossed by national road DN10, which runs from Brașov, 48 km (30 mi) to the west, to Buzău, 108 km (67 mi) to the southeast, crossing the Carpathian Mountains through the Buzău Pass. It is also crossed by national road DN13E, which starts in the nearby town of Întorsura Buzăului, passes through Covasna and Sfântu Gheorghe, and ends in Feldioara, Brașov County.

== Demographics ==
Historical population
Year	Pop.	±%
2002	4,814	—
2011	4,584	−4.8%
2021	4,722	+3.0%
Source: Census data

The commune has absolute ethnic Romanian majority. At the 2002 census, it had a population of 4,814, of which 99.81% or 4,805 were Romanians; other minorities were Hungarians and Germans, respectively 0.16% and 0.02% of the population. At the 2011 census, Sita Buzăului had a population of 4,584, of which 98.71% were Romanians. At the 2021 census, the number of inhabitants had increased 4,722, of which 96.65% were Romanians.

== Natives ==
- Amos Guttman (1954–1993), Israeli film director
