= Buzăiel =

Buzăiel Buzoel, Buzăul Mic
- Location within Romania

Location
- Country: Romania
- Counties: Brașov County
- Villages: Buzăiel

Physical characteristics
- Source: Ciucaș Mountains
- Mouth: Buzău
  - location: Buzăiel
  - coordinates: 45.6113°N 26.0059°E
- Length: 16 km (9.9 mi)
- Basin size: 54 km^{2} (21 sq mi)

Basin features
- Progression: Buzău→ Siret→ Danube→ Black Sea
- Tributaries
  - right: Tătaru, Târsa, Cremenea

The Buzăiel (also: Buzoel, Buzăul Mic) is a right tributary of the river Buzău in Romania that discharges into the Buzău near Vama Buzăului. It is 16 km (9.9 mi) long and its basin is 54 km^{2} (21 sq mi).
