= Buzău (river) =

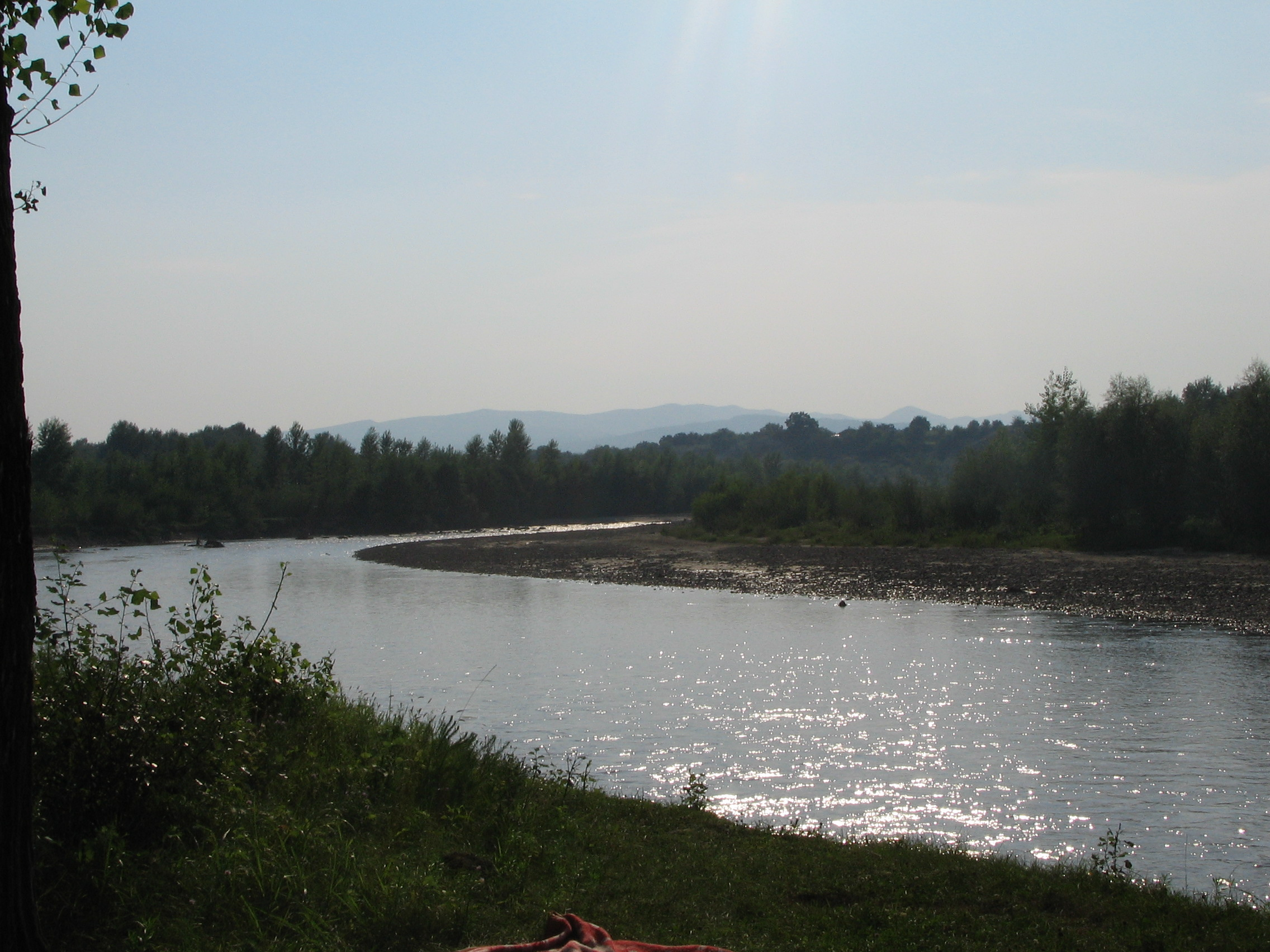
- Upstream view of the Buzău near Unguriu, Buzău County

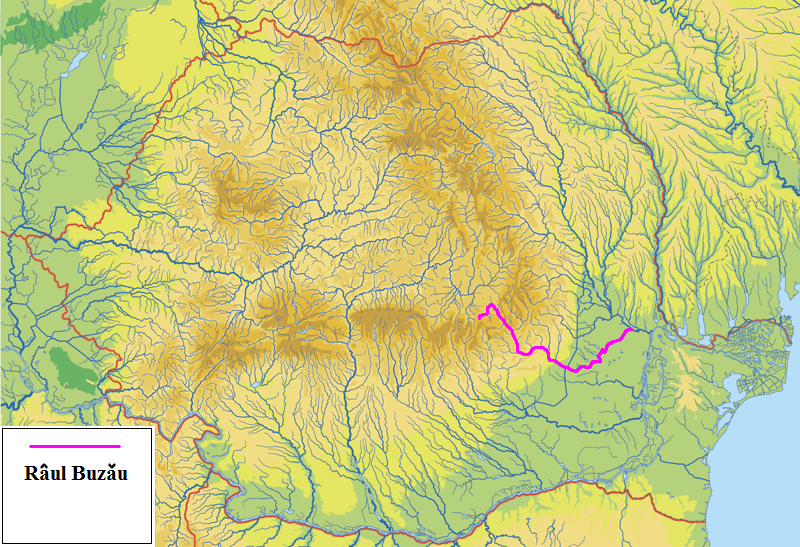

Location
- Country: Romania
- Counties: Brașov, Covasna, Buzău, Brăila
- Towns: Buzău

Physical characteristics
- Source: Ciucaș Mountains
- Mouth: Siret
  - coordinates: 45°24′49″N 27°44′29″E
- Length: 302 km (188 mi)
- Basin size: 5,264 km^{2} (2,032 sq mi)
- Discharge
  - location: Banița
  - average: 25.2 m^{3}/s (890 cu ft/s)

Basin features
- Progression: Siret→ Danube→ Black Sea
- Tributaries
  - left: Bâsca, Slănic, Câlnău
  - right: Bâsca Chiojdului

The Buzău river (Romanian pronunciation: [buˈzəw]) in eastern Romania is a tributary of the river Siret. Its total length is 302 km, and its drainage basin area is 5,264 km^{2}. Its source is in the south-eastern Carpathian Mountains, east of Brașov. The Buzău flows through the Romanian counties Brașov, Covasna, Buzău and Brăila. It flows into the Siret in Voinești, close to its confluence with the Danube, west of Galați.

The river Buzău gives its name to two urban municipalities: the city of Buzău (the Buzău county seat) and the town of Întorsura Buzăului, in Covasna County. Întorsura Buzăului (which means Buzău's Turning in Romanian) gets its name from being located near a large turn that the river takes. It initially flows northwards, but takes a sudden turn towards the south-east near the town.

== Towns and villages ==
The following towns and villages are situated along the river Buzău, from source to mouth: Vama Buzăului, Întorsura Buzăului, Sita Buzăului, Crasna, Siriu, Nehoiașu, Nehoiu, Păltineni, Pătârlagele, Pănătău, Cislău, Viperești, Măgura, Berca, Săpoca, Vernești, Mărăcineni, Buzău, Săgeata, Găvănești, Banița, Vișani, Câineni-Băi, Grădiștea, Racovița, Latinu.

== Tributaries ==
The following rivers are tributaries of the Buzău (from source to mouth):

Left: Strâmbul, Urlătoarea Mare, Urlătoarea Mică, Dălghiu, Acriș, Lădăuți, Zăbrătău, Harțag, Sasu, Grămăticu, Tehereu, Ghiurca Mare, Cășoaca Mare, Bâsca, Ciptoraș, Sibiciu, Pănătău, Rușavăț, Bălăneasa, Oleșești, Sărățel, Pâclele (or Murătoarea Pâclei), Slănic, Blăjanca, Valea Largă, Câlnău, Coștei, Valea Boului, Ghergheasa, Bold

Right: Pârâul Feței, Pârâul Ilcii, Buzăiel, Ciumernic, Chichirău, Crasna, Izvorul Negru, Bradu, Siriul Mare, Bonțu Mare, Nehoiu, Cătiașul Plescari, Valea Rea, Muscel, Bâsca Chiojdului, Nișcov, Buzoel
