= Berca =

- Commune
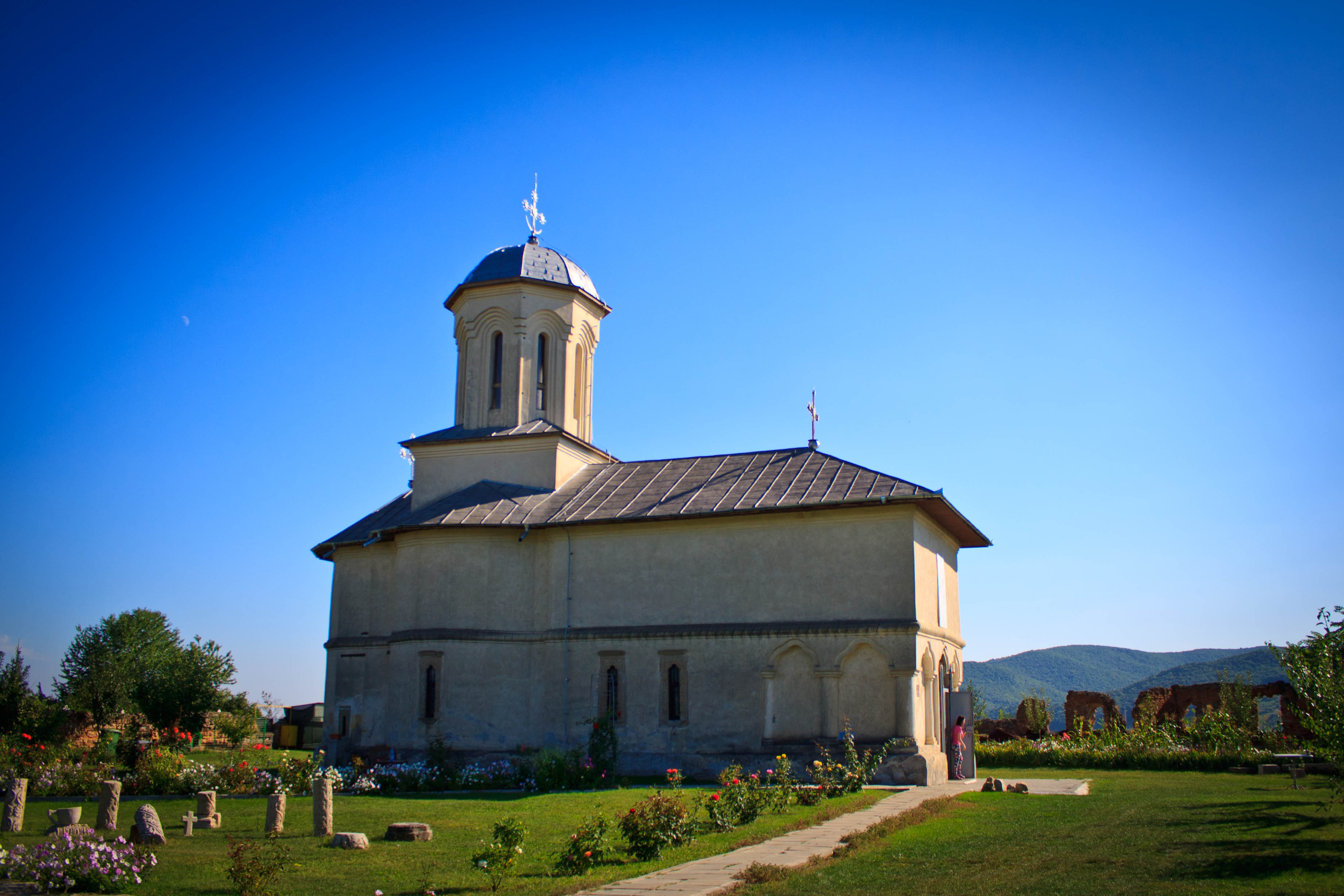
- St. Michael and Gabriel Church in Berca

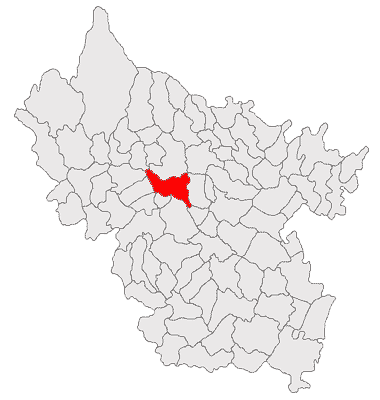
- Location in Buzău County

- Location in Romania
- Coordinates: 45°17′13″N 26°40′55″E
- Country: Romania
- County: Buzău
- Subdivisions: Băceni, Berca, Cojanu, Joseni, Mânăstirea Rătești, Pâclele, Pleșcoi, Pleșești, Rătești, Sătuc, Tâțârligu, Valea Nucului, Viforâta

Government
  - Mayor (2020–2024): Ionel Dobrița (PSD)
- Area: 73.28 km^{2} (28.29 sq mi)
- Elevation: 150 m (490 ft)
- Population (2021-12-01): 7,741
  - Density: 105.6/km^{2} (273.6/sq mi)
- Time zone: UTC+02:00 (EET)
  - Summer (DST): UTC+03:00 (EEST)
- Postal code: 127035
- Area code: +(40) 238
- Vehicle reg.: BZ
- Website: primariaberca.ro

Berca is a commune located in the hillside of Buzău County, Muntenia, Romania, in the valley of the river Buzău. It is an oil and natural gas extraction location.

The commune is composed of thirteen villages: Băceni, Berca, Cojanu, Joseni, Mânăstirea Rătești, Pâclele, Pleșcoi, Pleșești, Rătești, Sătuc, Tâțârligu, Valea Nucului, and Viforâta.

== Landmarks ==
=== The Mud Volcanoes ===
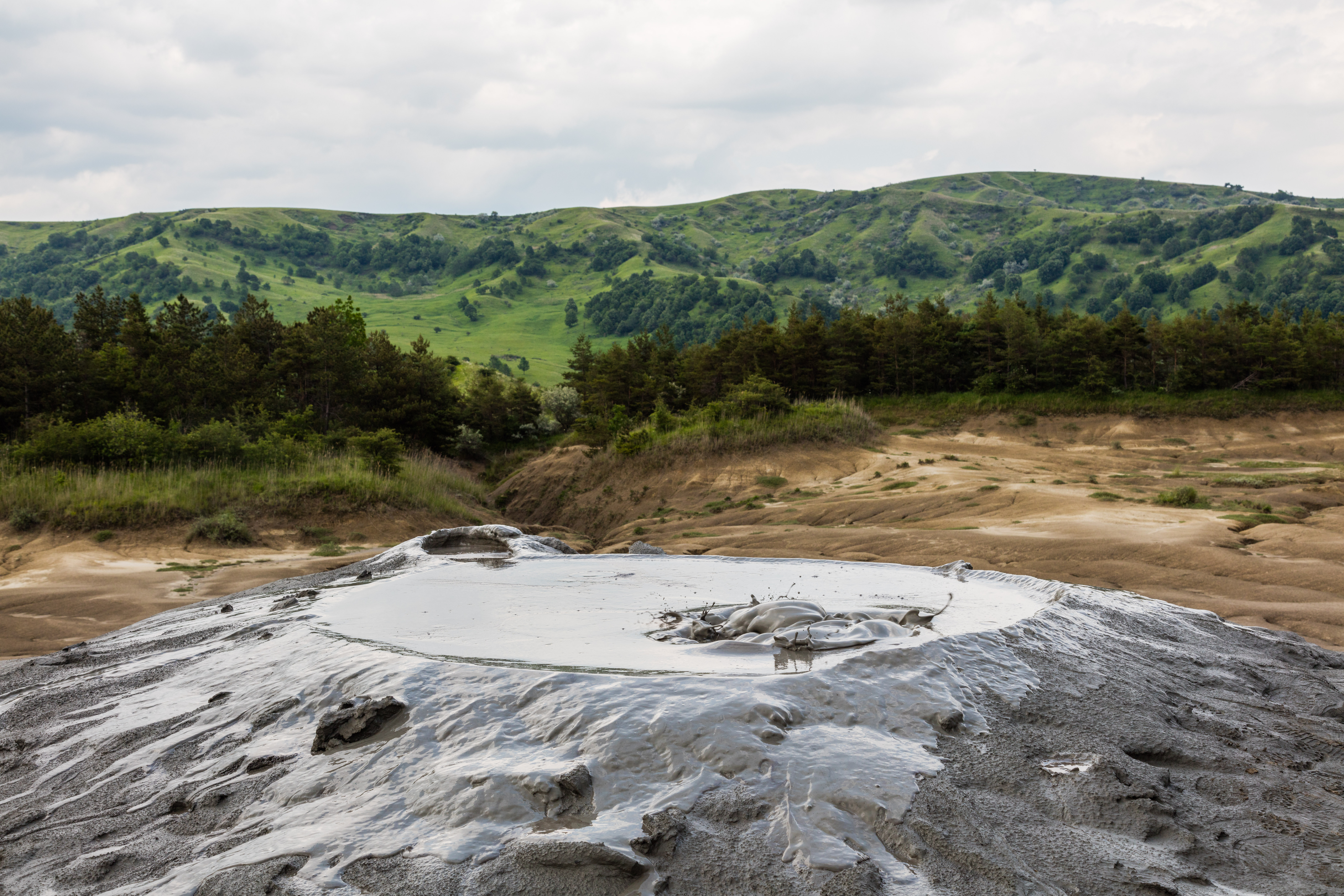
The Berca Mud Volcanoes

The Berca Muddy Volcanoes geological and botanical reservation lies in the hills that surround the commune, near the Pâclele village. Mud volcanos, a rare geological phenomenon, occurs there when mud and gas are expelled from a depth of 3 kilometres (9,800 ft) through structures resembling real miniature volcanoes.

=== Rătești monastery ===
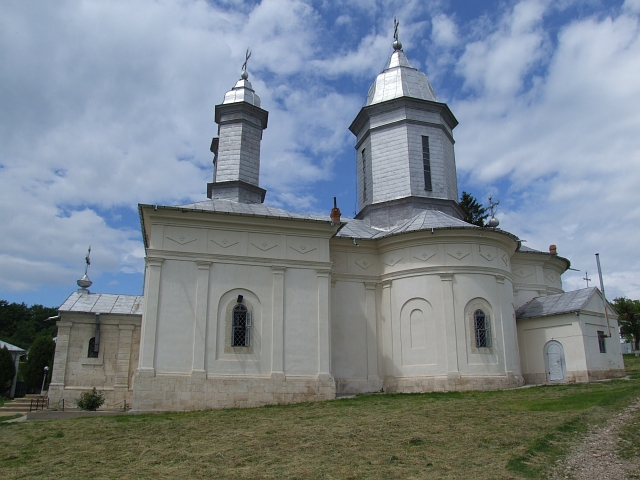
The church of Rătești Monastery

Rătești Monastery is a medieval monastery, attested by documents from the 17th century. It is an Eastern orthodox monastery of nuns, and hosts a museum exhibiting religious books and items.

== Demographics ==
Historical population
Year	Pop.	±%
2002	9,602	—
2011	8,534	−11.1%
2021	7,741	−9.3%
Source: Census data

The Romanian census of 2002 reported a population of 9,602 for the Berca commune, making it one of the largest communes in the county; 99% of the inhabitants were ethnic Romanians. At the 2021 census, Berca had a population of 7,741, of which 88.88% were Romanians.

== Natives ==
- George Macovescu (1913–2002), writer and communist politician
- Ciprian Petre (born 1980), footballer

== Pleșcoi ==
Pleșcoi village is famous for its meat processing tradition. The Pleșcoi sausages are smoked mutton sausages with chili peppers and garlic. The name Pleșcoi sausages is a protected designation of origin in the European Union.
