= Săgeata =

- Commune
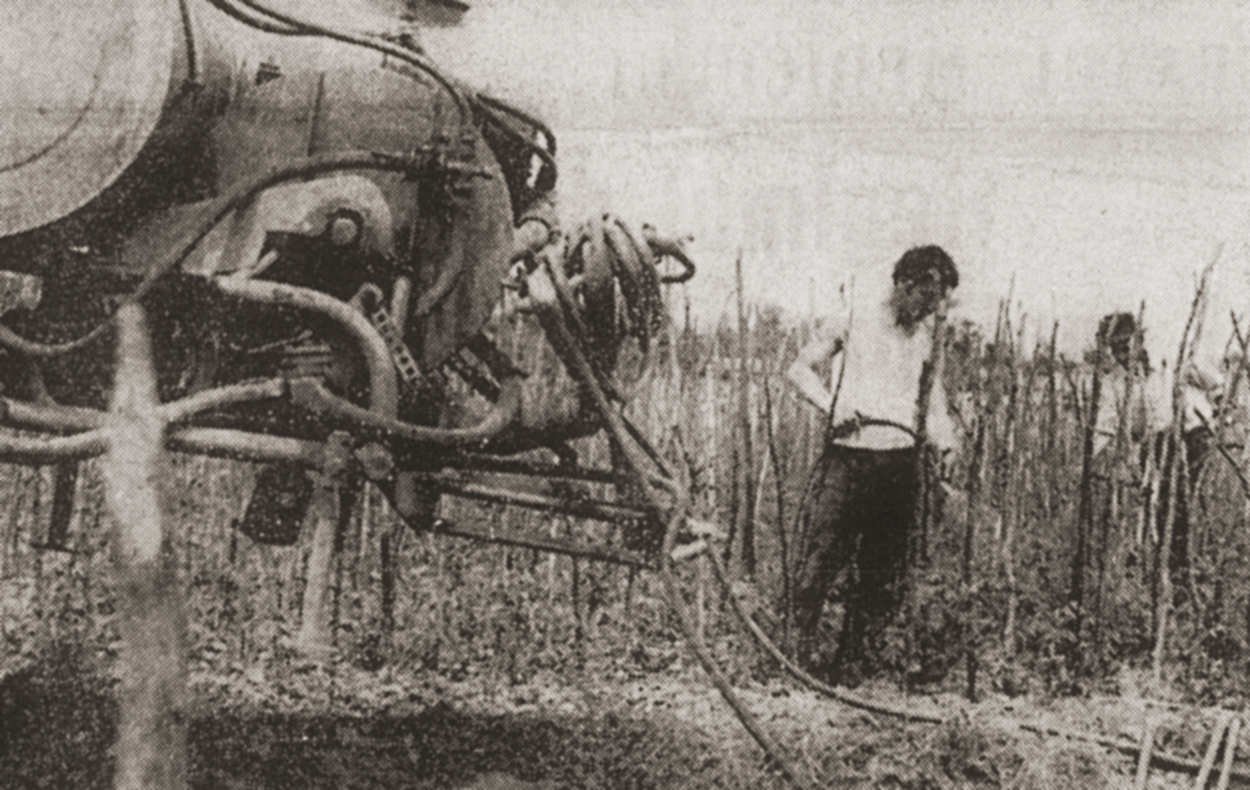
- Fungicide application against the blight (Alternaria) in a field of tomatoes outside Săgeata, July 1971

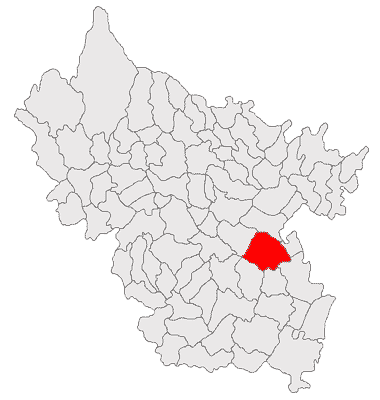
- Location in Buzău County

- Location in Romania
- Coordinates: 45°6′N 26°59′E
- Country: Romania
- County: Buzău
- Subdivisions: Banița, Beilic, Bordușani, Dâmbroca, Găvănești, Movilița, Săgeata

Government
  - Mayor (2020–2024): Sorin Tănase (PSD)
- Area: 102.18 km^{2} (39.45 sq mi)
- Elevation: 65 m (213 ft)
- Population (2021-12-01): 4,069
  - Density: 39.82/km^{2} (103.1/sq mi)
- Time zone: UTC+02:00 (EET)
  - Summer (DST): UTC+03:00 (EEST)
- Postal code: 127520
- Area code: +(40) 238
- Vehicle reg.: BZ
- Website: www.comunasageata.ro

Săgeata is a commune in Buzău County, Muntenia, Romania. It is composed of seven villages: Banița, Beilic, Bordușani, Dâmbroca, Găvănești, Movilița, and Săgeata.

Historical population
Year	Pop.	±%
2002	5,483	—
2011	4,949	−9.7%
2021	4,069	−17.8%
Source: Census data

== Natives ==
- Valentin Maftei (born 1974), rugby union player
