= Bogota (disambiguation) =

Bogotá is the capital of Colombia.

Bogota or Bogotá may also refer to:

== Places ==
=== Colombia ===
- Bacatá, also transliterated as Bogot(h)á, the former main settlement of the southern Muisca Confederation before the Spanish conquest
- Bogotá Province, a former province of Gran Colombia and later of the Republic of New Granada
- Bogotá savanna, a high plateau in the center of Colombia
- Metropolitan Area of Bogotá, the metropolitan area of the capital

=== United States ===
- Bogota, Illinois, an unincorporated community in Jasper County
- Bogota, New Jersey, a borough in Bergen County
- Bogota, Tennessee, a farming community in Dyer County
- Bogota (Port Republic, Virginia), a historic home and farm in Rockingham County

== Rivers ==
=== Colombia ===
- Bogotá River, a major river of the Cundinamarca department

== Geology ==
- Bogotá Formation, fossil-bearing Paleocene-Eocene formation
- Bogotá Fault, major thrust fault to the east of Bogotá

== Other uses ==
- Bogota (gunboat), a ship that served in the Colombian navy
- Bogota people, an indigenous group in Panama
- Bogotá: City of the Lost, a 2024 South Korean crime drama film

== See also ==
- Bogata (disambiguation)
