= Vama Buzăului =

- Commune
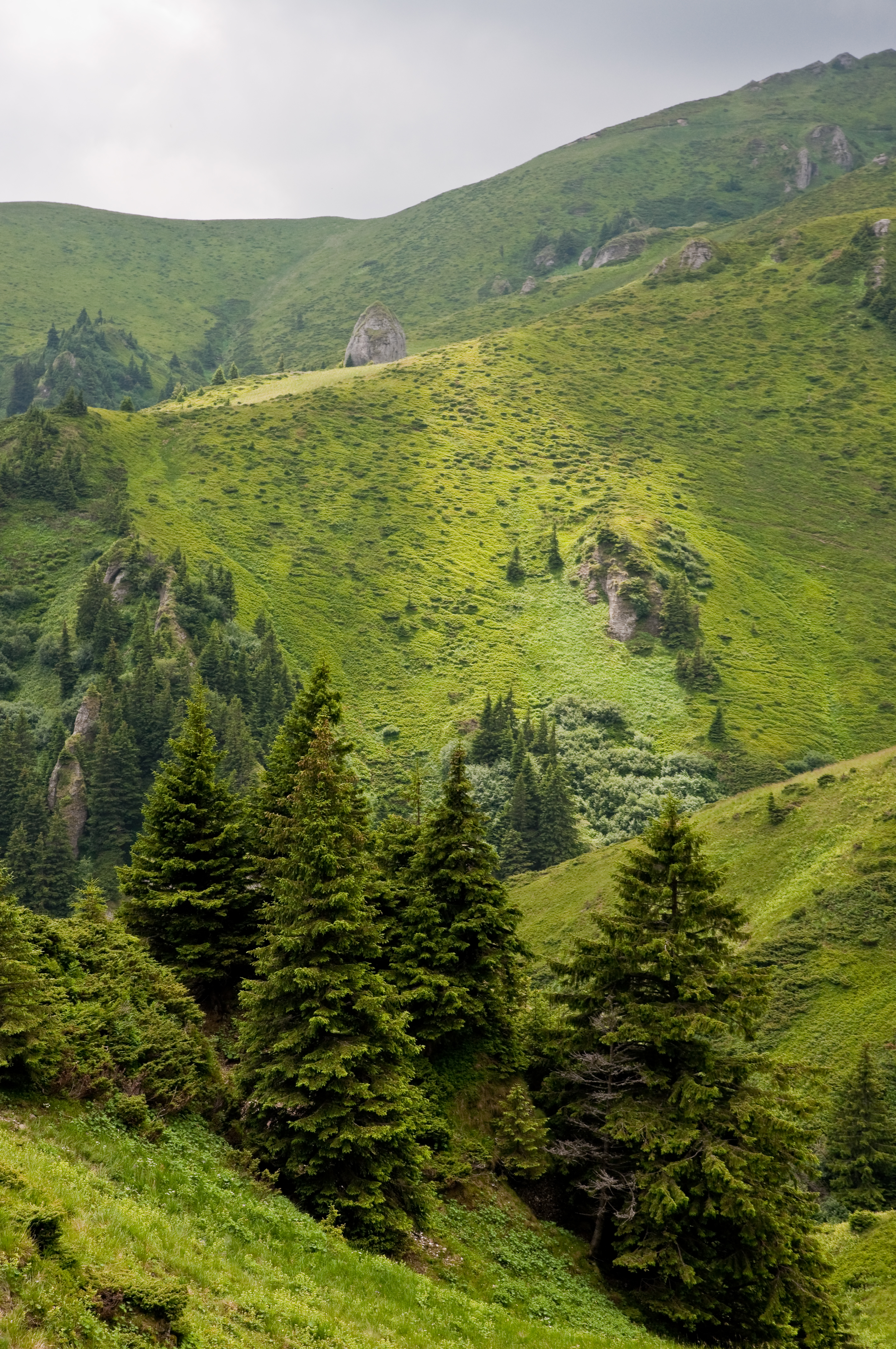

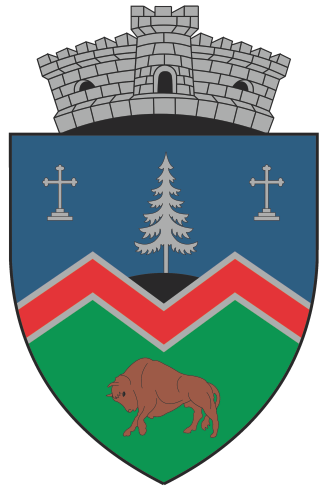
- Coat of arms

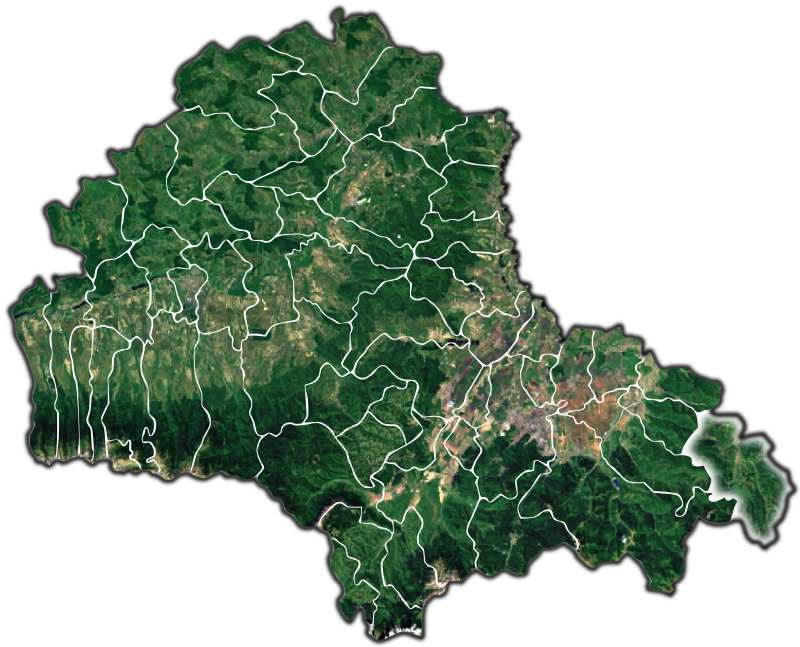
- Location in Brașov County

- Location in Romania
- Coordinates: 45°35′N 25°59′E
- Country: Romania
- County: Brașov
- Subdivisions: Acriș, Buzăiel, Dălghiu, Vama Buzăului

Government
  - Mayor (2020–2024): Tiberiu-Nicolae Chirilaș (PSD)
- Area: 156.63 km^{2} (60.48 sq mi)
- Elevation: 778 m (2,552 ft)
- Population (2021-12-01): 3,486
  - Density: 22.26/km^{2} (57.64/sq mi)
- Time zone: UTC+02:00 (EET)
  - Summer (DST): UTC+03:00 (EEST)
- Postal code: 507245
- Area code: (+40) 02 68
- Vehicle reg.: BV
- Website: www.comunavamabuzaului.ro

Vama Buzăului (German: Bodzau; Hungarian: Bodzavám) is a commune in Brașov County, Transylvania, Romania. It is composed of four villages: Acriș (Egrestelep), Buzăiel (Kisbodza), Dălghiu (Döblön), and Vama Buzăului.

== Geography ==
The commune is situated at an altitude of 778 m (2,552 ft), on the banks of the Buzău River, close to its source in the Ciucaș Mountains. It is located in the southeastern corner of Brașov County, on the border with the Prahova, Buzău, and Covasna counties, at a distance of 9 km (5.6 mi) from the town of Întorsura Buzăului and 47 km (29 mi) from the county seat, Brașov. Vama Buzăului is crossed by the DC49A road, which connects it to national road DC10 to the north and county road DJ103A to the west.

== Demographics ==
Historical population
Year	Pop.	±%
2002	3,356	—
2011	3,220	−4.1%
2021	3,486	+8.3%
Source: Census data

At the 2021 census, the commune had a population of 3,486; of those, 82.27% were Romanians and 10.61% were Roma.

== Bison reserve ==
The Valea Zimbrilor Nature Reserve, located in Acriș village, is home to a population of European bisons. Founded in 2008 on an area covering 90 ha (220 acres), the reserve held 28 bisons in 2018; since then, four have been sent to other reserves in the Southern Carpathians, and four to roam completely free in the Țarcu Mountains.
