= Crasna (Buzău) =

- Location within Romania

Location
- Country: Romania
- Counties: Covasna County

Physical characteristics
- Source: Mount Tătăruțu
  - location: Siriu Mountains
- Mouth: Buzău
  - location: Crasna
  - coordinates: 45.5867°N 26.1482°E
- Length: 9 km (5.6 mi)
- Basin size: 25 km^{2} (9.7 sq mi)

Basin features
- Progression: Buzău→ Siret→ Danube→ Black Sea
- Tributaries
  - right: Urlătoarea, Manea

The Crasna is a right tributary of the river Buzău in Romania. It discharges into the Buzău in the village Crasna. Its length is 9 km (5.6 mi) and its basin size is 25 km^{2} (9.7 sq mi).
