= Cășoaca Mare =

Cășoaca Mare Cașoca
- Location within Romania

Location
- Country: Romania
- Counties: Buzău County

Physical characteristics
- Source: Buzău Mountains
- Mouth: Buzău
  - location: Cașoca
  - coordinates: 45.4841°N 26.2557°E
- Length: 16 km (9.9 mi)
- Basin size: 57 km^{2} (22 sq mi)

Basin features
- Progression: Buzău→ Siret→ Danube→ Black Sea
- Tributaries
  - left: Titilău, Pruncea, Trestia

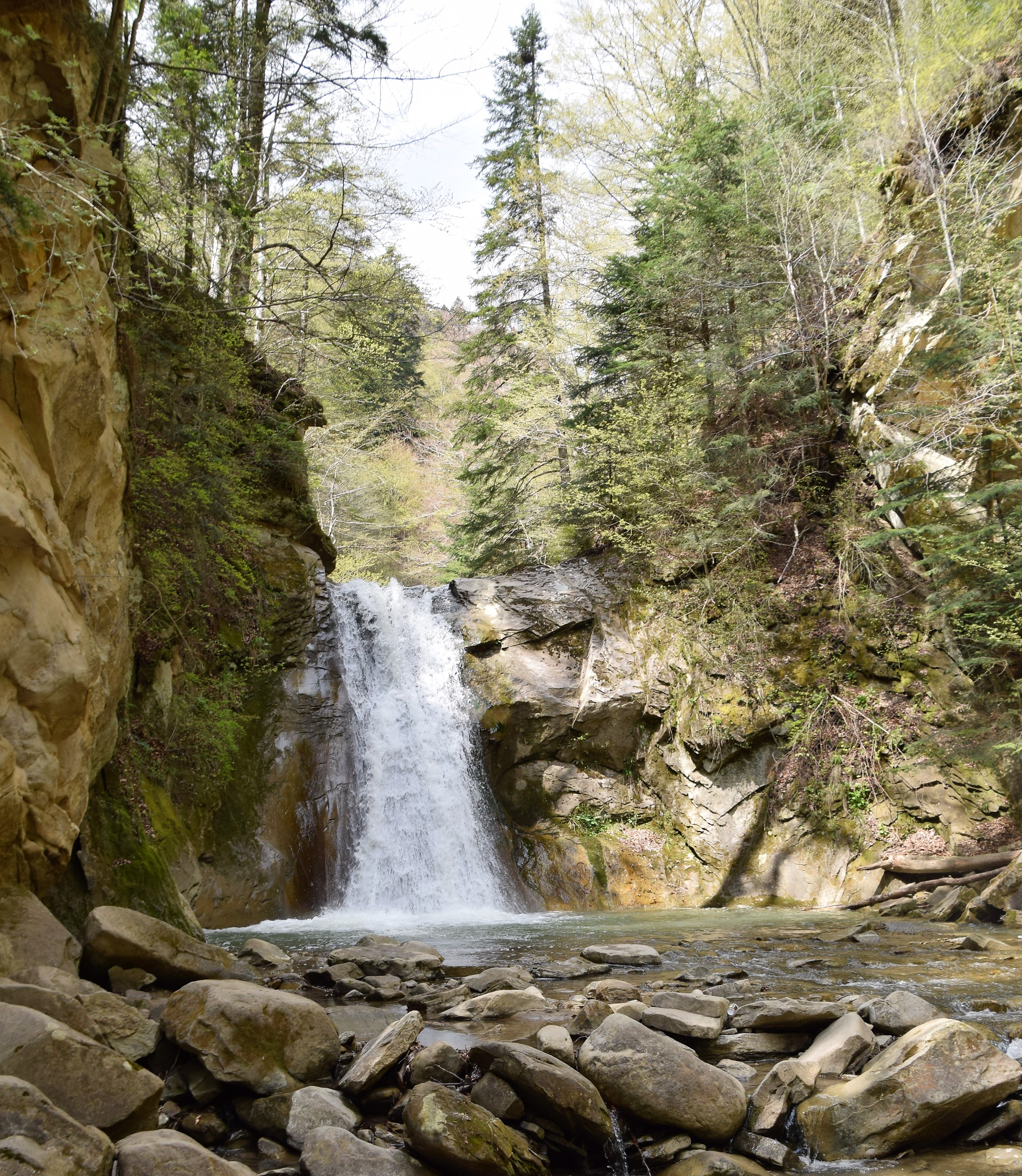
Cascade Cașoca Waterfall

The Cășoaca Mare (also: Cașoca) is a left tributary of the river Buzău in Romania. It discharges into the Buzău in the village Cașoca. Its length is 16 km (9.9 mi) and its basin size is 57 km^{2} (22 sq mi).
