= Măxineni =

- Commune
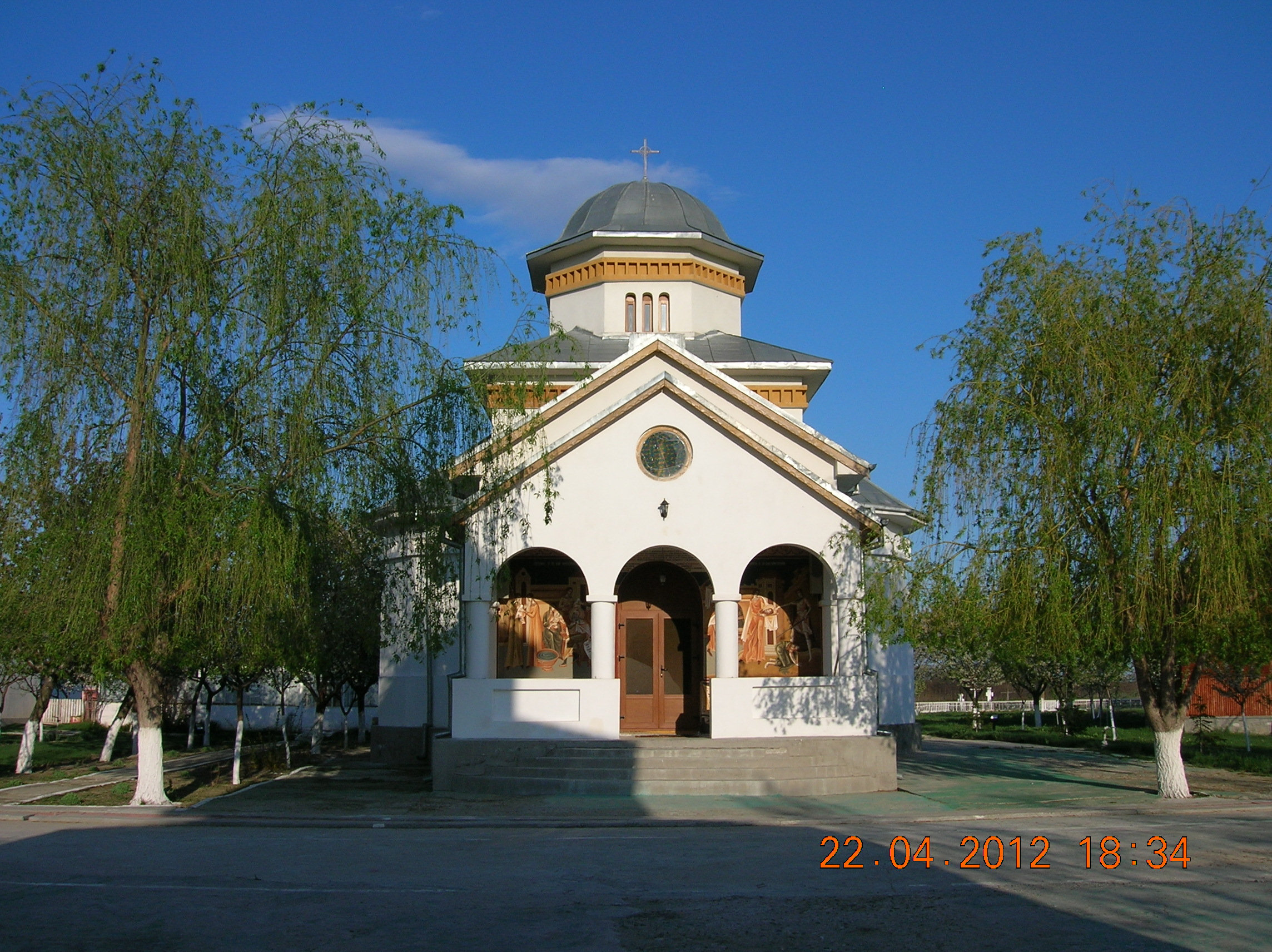
- Măxineni Monastery

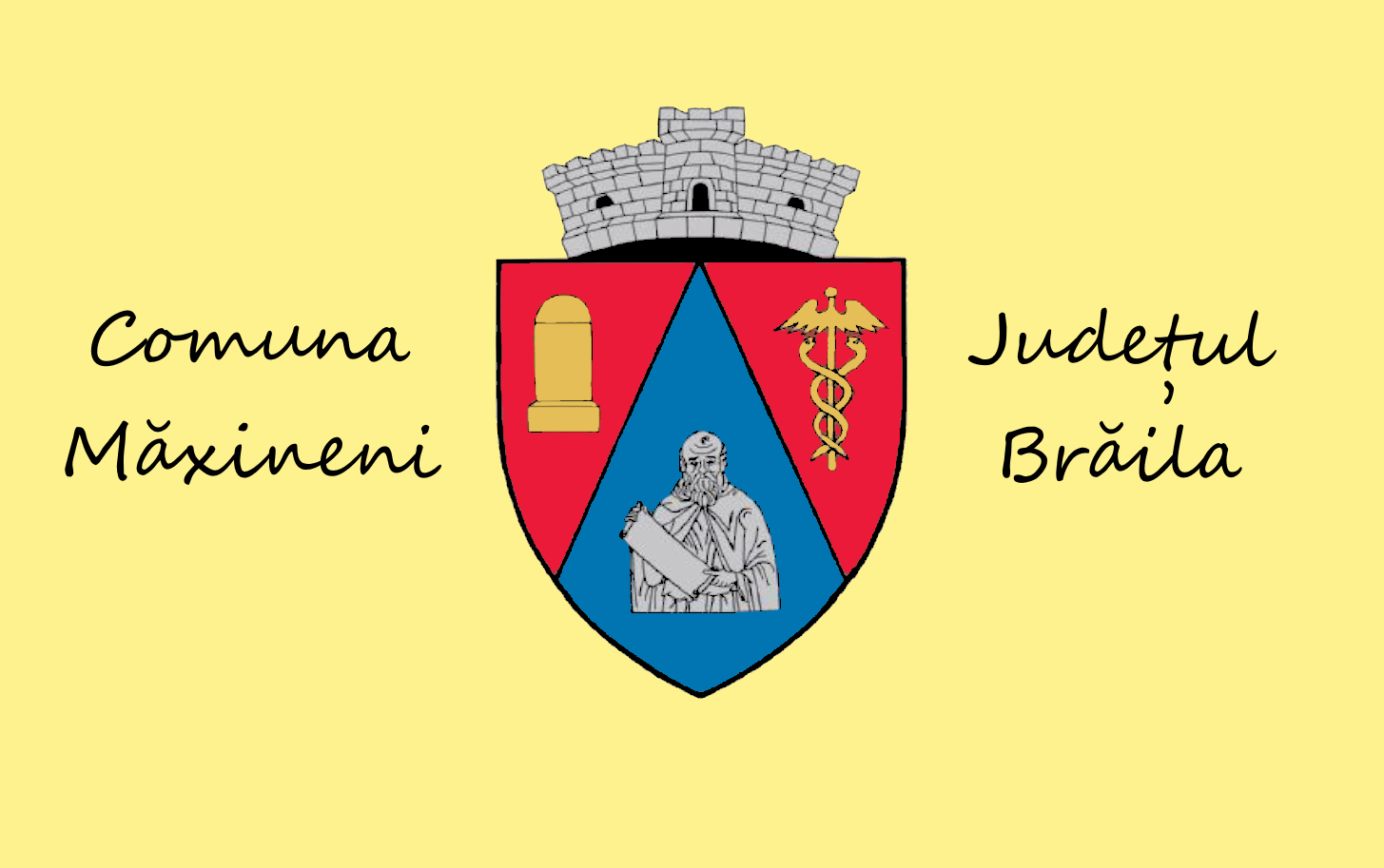
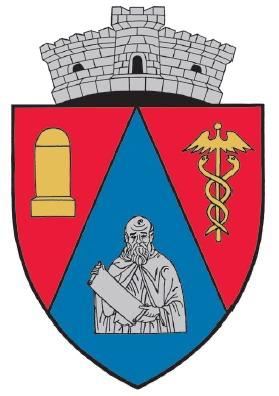
- Flag Coat of arms

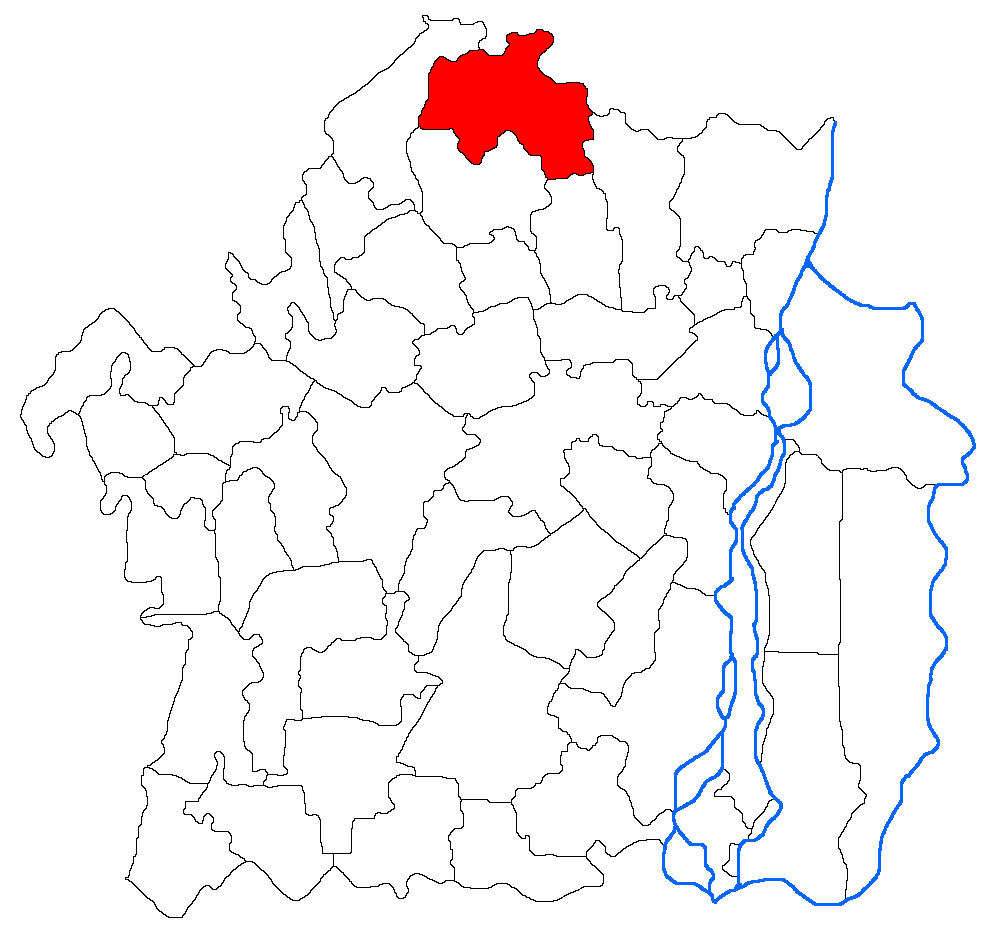
- Location in Brăila County

- Location in Romania
- Coordinates: 45°24′N 27°38′E
- Country: Romania
- County: Brăila

Government
  - Mayor (2020–2024): Ionuț Daniel Postolache (USR)
- Area: 133.63 km^{2} (51.59 sq mi)
- Elevation: 11 m (36 ft)
- Population (2021-12-01): 3,265
  - Density: 24.43/km^{2} (63.28/sq mi)
- Time zone: UTC+02:00 (EET)
  - Summer (DST): UTC+03:00 (EEST)
- Postal code: 817090
- Area code: +(40) 239
- Vehicle reg.: BR
- Website: primariamaxineni.ro

Măxineni is a commune located in Brăila County, Muntenia, Romania. It is composed of five villages: Corbu Nou, Corbu Vechi, Latinu, Măxineni, and Voinești.
