= Harțag =

- Location within Romania

Location
- Country: Romania
- Counties: Buzău County

Physical characteristics
- Source: Buzău Mountains
- Mouth: Buzău
  - coordinates: 45.5613°N 26.1790°E
- Length: 8 km (5.0 mi)
- Basin size: 36 km^{2} (14 sq mi)

Basin features
- Progression: Buzău→ Siret→ Danube→ Black Sea
- Tributaries
  - left: Ceapa, Hărțăgel
  - right: Pascu

The Harțag is a left tributary of the river Buzău in Romania. Its source is in the Buzău Mountains. It flows into the Buzău downstream from Crasna. Its length is 8 km (5.0 mi) and its basin size is 36 km^{2} (14 sq mi).
