= Scorțoasa =

- Commune
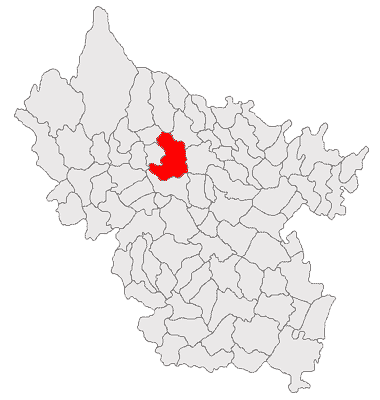
- Location in Buzău County

- Location in Romania
- Coordinates: 45°22′N 26°40′E
- Country: Romania
- County: Buzău
- Subdivisions: Balta Tocila, Beciu, Dâlma, Deleni, Golu Grabicina, Grabicina de Jos, Grabicina de Sus, Gura Văii, Plopeasa, Policiori, Scorțoasa

Government
  - Mayor (2020–2024): Vasile Săcuiu (PMP)
- Area: 95.95 km^{2} (37.05 sq mi)
- Elevation: 240 m (790 ft)
- Population (2021-12-01): 2,452
  - Density: 25.55/km^{2} (66.19/sq mi)
- Time zone: UTC+02:00 (EET)
  - Summer (DST): UTC+03:00 (EEST)
- Postal code: 127555
- Area code: +(40) 238
- Vehicle reg.: BZ
- Website: primaria.scortoasa.ro

Scorțoasa is a commune in Buzău County, Muntenia, Romania. It is composed of eleven villages: Balta Tocila, Beciu, Dâlma, Deleni, Golu Grabicina, Grabicina de Jos, Grabicina de Sus, Gura Văii, Plopeasa, Policiori, and Scorțoasa.

Historical population
Year	Pop.	±%
2002	3,433	—
2011	3,076	−10.4%
2021	2,452	−20.3%
Source: Census data
