= Întorsura Buzăului =

- Town
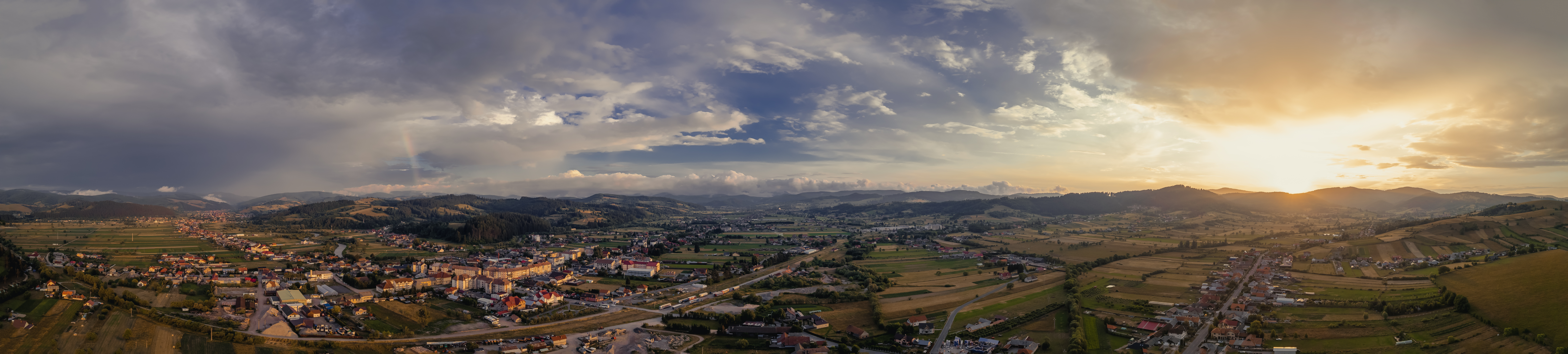

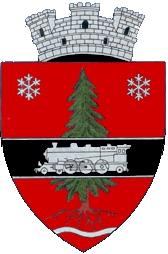
- Coat of arms

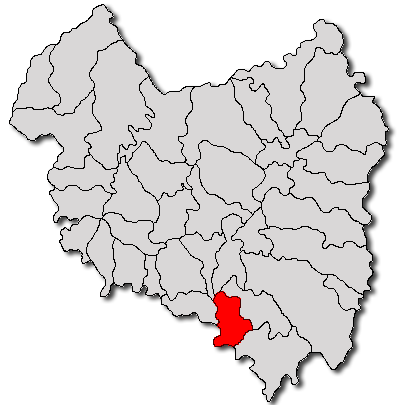
- Location in Covasna County

- Location in Romania
- Coordinates: 45°40′22″N 26°2′3″E
- Country: Romania
- County: Covasna

Government
  - Mayor (2024–2028): Raul Urdă
- Area: 60.97 km^{2} (23.54 sq mi)
- Elevation: 754 m (2,474 ft)
- Population (2021-12-01): 8,332
  - Density: 136.7/km^{2} (353.9/sq mi)
- Time zone: UTC+02:00 (EET)
  - Summer (DST): UTC+03:00 (EEST)
- Postal code: 525300
- Area code: +(40) 267
- Vehicle reg.: CV
- Website: www.intorsura.info

Întorsura Buzăului (Hungarian: Bodzaforduló [ˈbodd͡zɒforduloː]) is a town in Covasna County, Transylvania, Romania. It administers three villages: Brădet (Bredét), Floroaia (Virágospatak), and Scrădoasa.

== Geography ==
The town is located in the southern part of the county, on the border with Brașov County, and lies on the left bank of the Buzău River. The town's name means Buzău's Turning in Romanian; it gets its name from being located near a large turn that the river takes. The river initially flows northwards, but takes a sudden turn towards the south-east near the town.

Întorsura Buzăului is located at 750 m (2,460 ft) altitude, in a depression, surrounded by the Întorsurii, Ciucaș, and Siriu mountains. Due to its location, the town registers the lowest temperatures in Romania every year.

The town is some 40 km (25 mi) southeast of the county seat, Sfântu Gheorghe, and 33 km (21 mi) south of Covasna. It is traversed by national road DN10, which links Brașov to Buzău. This road passes through the Carpathian Mountains and for most of its length follows the Buzău River. There is also a railroad that links Brașov and Întorsura Buzăului which goes through the Teliu Tunnel that crosses the Întorsurii Mountains; with a length of 4,369.5 m (14,336 ft), this is the longest railway tunnel in Romania.

== Population ==
At the 2021 census, Întorsura Buzăului had a population of 8,332; of those, 92.49% were ethnic Romanians. At the 2011 census, the town had 7,319 inhabitants, of whom 7,265 were ethnic Romanians, 37 were ethnic Hungarians, and 12 ethnic Romani.

Demographic movement according to the censuses:

== Climate ==
Climate data for Întorsura Buzăului (elevation 707m, 2014–2026 normals, extremes 1980–present)
Month	Jan	Feb	Mar	Apr	May	Jun	Jul	Aug	Sep	Oct	Nov	Dec	Year
Record high °C (°F)	15.9 (60.6)	20.9 (69.6)	26.5 (79.7)	27.4 (81.3)	29.8 (85.6)	32.1 (89.8)	35.8 (96.4)	34.0 (93.2)	33.4 (92.1)	30.4 (86.7)	25.6 (78.1)	18.0 (64.4)	35.8 (96.4)
Mean daily maximum °C (°F)	1.8 (35.2)	4.9 (40.8)	9.4 (48.9)	14.2 (57.6)	18.7 (65.7)	24.0 (75.2)	25.4 (77.7)	26.3 (79.3)	21.1 (70.0)	15.1 (59.2)	9.3 (48.7)	3.9 (39.0)	14.5 (58.1)
Daily mean °C (°F)	−2.9 (26.8)	−0.1 (31.8)	3.6 (38.5)	7.7 (45.9)	12.3 (54.1)	17.3 (63.1)	18.7 (65.7)	18.5 (65.3)	14.0 (57.2)	8.6 (47.5)	4.3 (39.7)	0.2 (32.4)	8.5 (47.3)
Mean daily minimum °C (°F)	−7.7 (18.1)	−5.2 (22.6)	−2.1 (28.2)	1.1 (34.0)	5.9 (42.6)	10.7 (51.3)	11.9 (53.4)	10.6 (51.1)	6.9 (44.4)	2.1 (35.8)	−0.7 (30.7)	−3.4 (25.9)	2.5 (36.5)
Record low °C (°F)	−35.5 (−31.9)	−35.8 (−32.4)	−31.4 (−24.5)	−10.1 (13.8)	−5.7 (21.7)	−2.7 (27.1)	3.2 (37.8)	1.0 (33.8)	−6.0 (21.2)	−21.3 (−6.3)	−26.5 (−15.7)	−34.5 (−30.1)	−35.8 (−32.4)
Average precipitation mm (inches)	31.5 (1.24)	27.5 (1.08)	40.0 (1.57)	53.0 (2.09)	88.2 (3.47)	93.4 (3.68)	98.6 (3.88)	58.7 (2.31)	50.3 (1.98)	48.0 (1.89)	37.7 (1.48)	34.0 (1.34)	660.9 (26.01)
Average precipitation days (≥ 1.0 mm)	7.8	6.2	7.2	8.6	11.9	11.0	9.9	5.5	6.4	7.0	6.8	7.8	96.1
Average snowy days	10.2	7.5	4.7	2.4	0	0	0	0	0	0	3.3	7.6	35.7
Source: Meteomanz.com, Infoclimat.fr, HotNews.ro

== Local festival ==
The Ciobănașul (English: Little Shepherd) Annual Festival takes place in Întorsura Buzăului on the first Sunday of September and lasts for two days. At the festival, visitors come from the town and the surrounding villages, and even from other counties. In 2006, Romanian President Traian Băsescu attended the festival. During the festival the attendants can consume Romanian traditional foods and drinks and are entertained with Romanian folk music.

== Natives ==
- Valeriu Bularca (1931–2017), Greco-Roman wrestler
- Gheorghe Tohăneanu (born 1936), gymnast

== Gallery ==
Historical population
Year	Pop.	±%
1977	6,541	—
1992	8,626	+31.9%
2002	9,081	+5.3%
2011	7,319	−19.4%
2021	8,332	+13.8%
Source: Census data

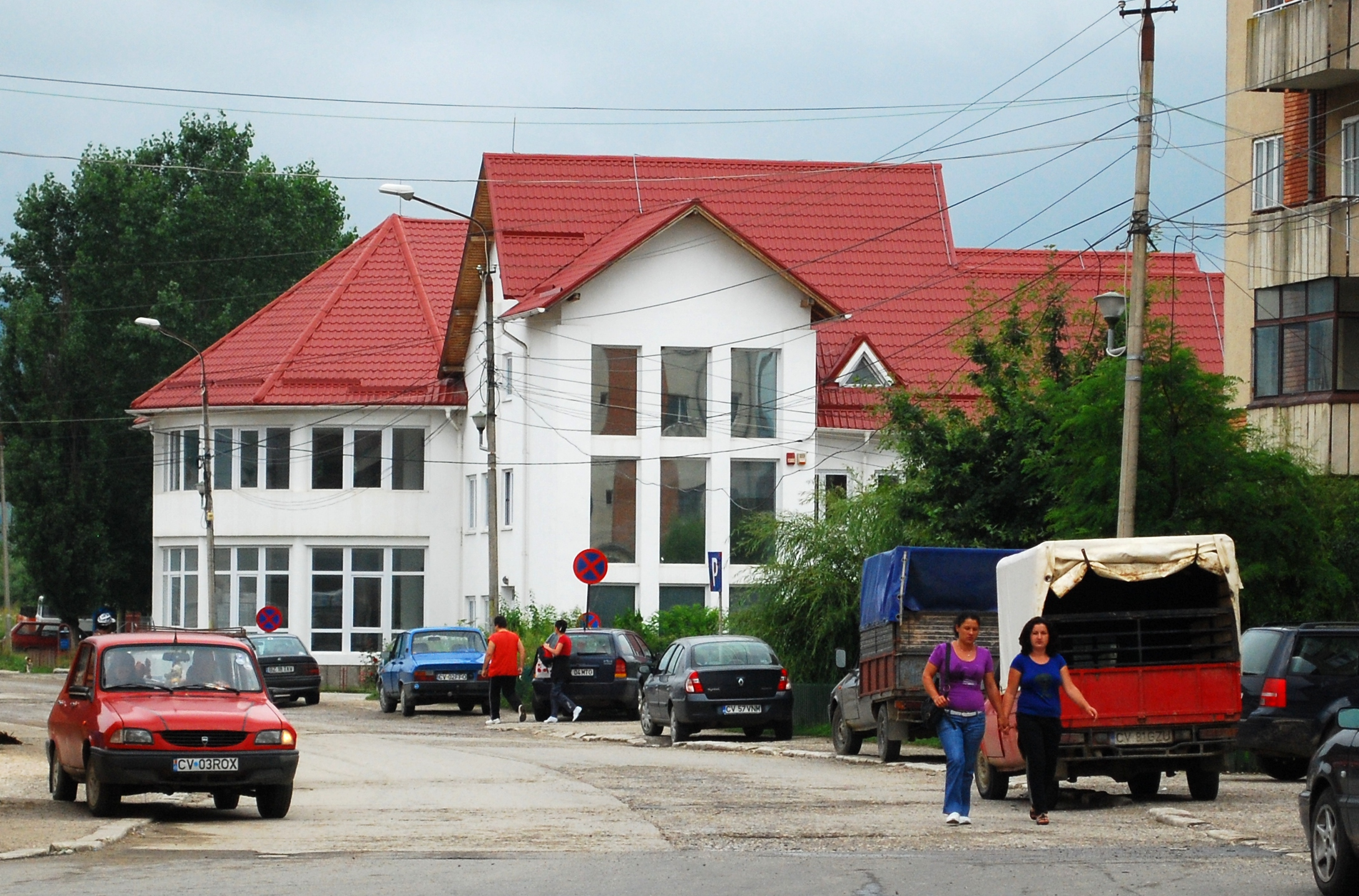
The railway station

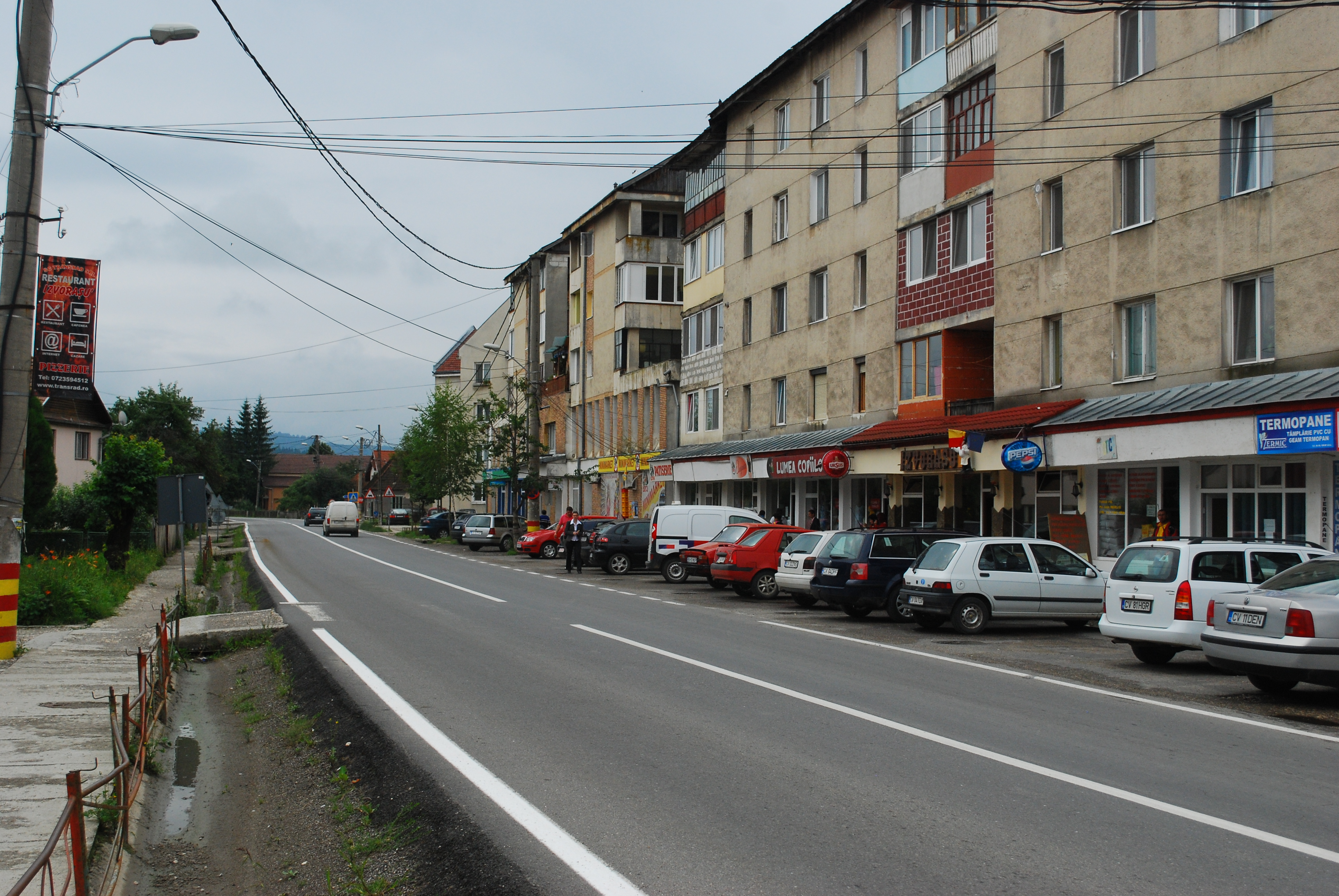
A street in the town

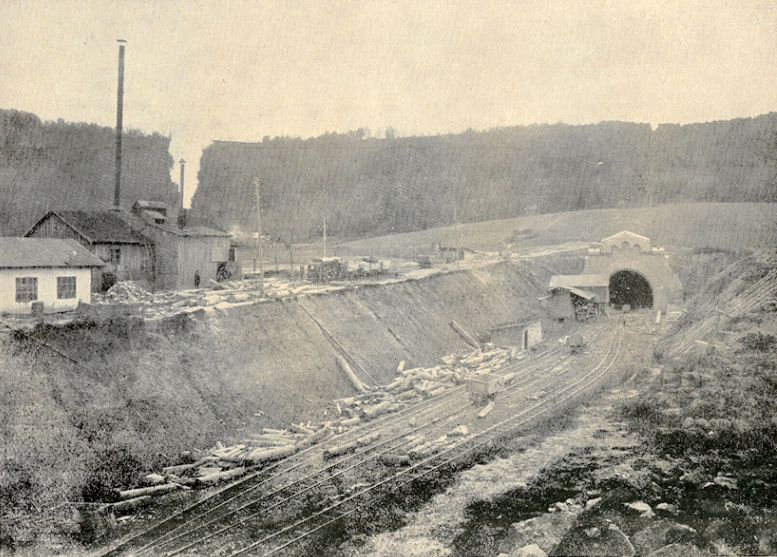
Construction of the Teliu–Întorsura Buzăului Tunnel, c. 1924
