= Bogata (Olt) =

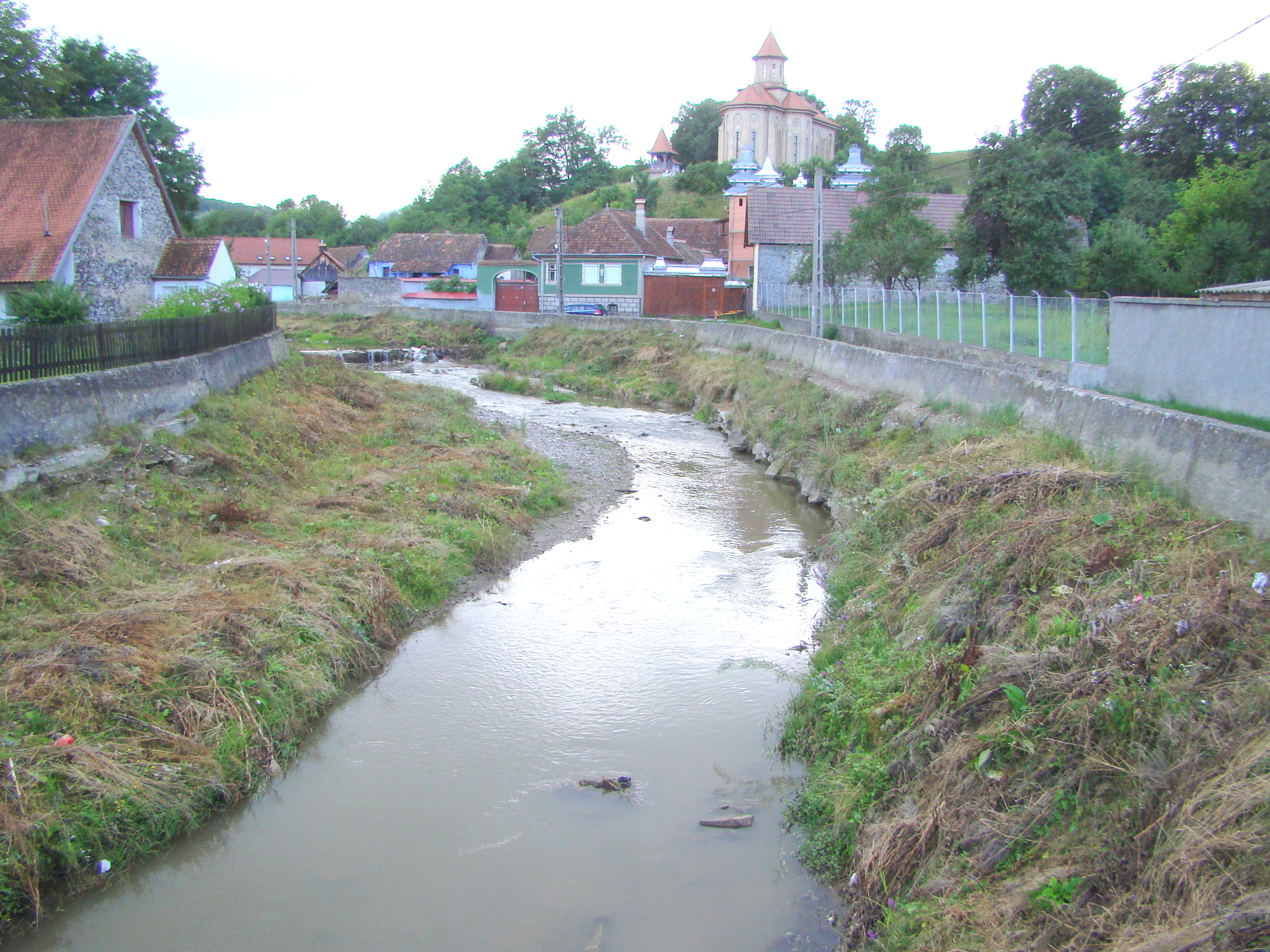

- Location within Romania

Location
- Country: Romania
- Counties: Brașov County
- Villages: Bogata Olteană

Physical characteristics
- Mouth: Olt
  - location: Bogata Olteană
  - coordinates: 45.9832°N 25.3595°E
- Length: 17 km (11 mi)
- Basin size: 54 km^{2} (21 sq mi)

Basin features
- Progression: Olt→ Danube→ Black Sea
- Tributaries
  - left: Trestia

The Bogata is a right tributary of the river Olt in Romania. It discharges into the Olt in Bogata Olteană. Its length is 17 km (11 mi) and its basin size is 54 km^{2} (21 sq mi).
