= Odăile =

- Commune
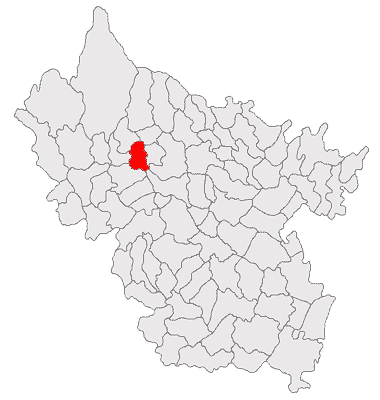
- Location in Buzău County

- Location in Romania
- Coordinates: 45°23′37″N 26°32′43″E
- Country: Romania
- County: Buzău
- Subdivisions: Capu Satului, Corneanu, Gorâni, Lacu, Odăile, Piatra Albă, Posobești, Scoroșești, Valea Fântânei, Valea Ștefanului

Government
  - Mayor (2020–2024): Tache-Cristache Grama (PSD)
- Area: 35.93 km^{2} (13.87 sq mi)
- Elevation: 552 m (1,811 ft)
- Population (2021-12-01): 651
  - Density: 18/km^{2} (47/sq mi)
- Time zone: EET/EEST (UTC+2/+3)
- Postal code: 127395
- Area code: +(40) 238
- Vehicle reg.: BZ
- Website: www.primariaodaile.ro

Odăile is a commune in Buzău County, Muntenia, Romania. It is composed of ten villages: Capu Satului, Corneanu, Gorâni, Lacu, Odăile, Piatra Albă, Posobești, Scoroșești, Valea Fântânei, and Valea Ștefanului.

Historical population
Year	Pop.	±%
2002	1,095	—
2011	882	−19.5%
2021	651	−26.2%
Source: Census data
