= Murgești =

- Commune
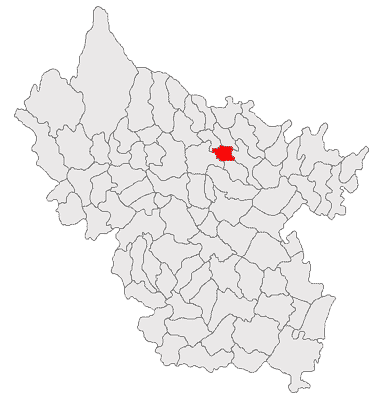
- Location in Buzău County

- Location in Romania
- Coordinates: 45°24′N 26°53′E
- Country: Romania
- County: Buzău
- Subdivisions: Batogu, Murgești, Valea Ratei

Government
  - Mayor (2020–2024): Ionel-Edgar Negraru (PSD)
- Area: 29.42 km^{2} (11.36 sq mi)
- Elevation: 293 m (961 ft)
- Population (2021-12-01): 727
  - Density: 24.7/km^{2} (64.0/sq mi)
- Time zone: EET/EEST (UTC+2/+3)
- Postal code: 127385
- Area code: +(40) 238
- Vehicle reg.: BZ
- Website: primariamurgesti.ro

Murgești is a commune in Buzău County, Muntenia, Romania. It is composed of three villages: Batogu, Murgești, and Valea Ratei.

Historical population
Year	Pop.	±%
2002	1,165	—
2011	966	−17.1%
2021	727	−24.7%
Source: Census data
