= Bozioru =

- Commune
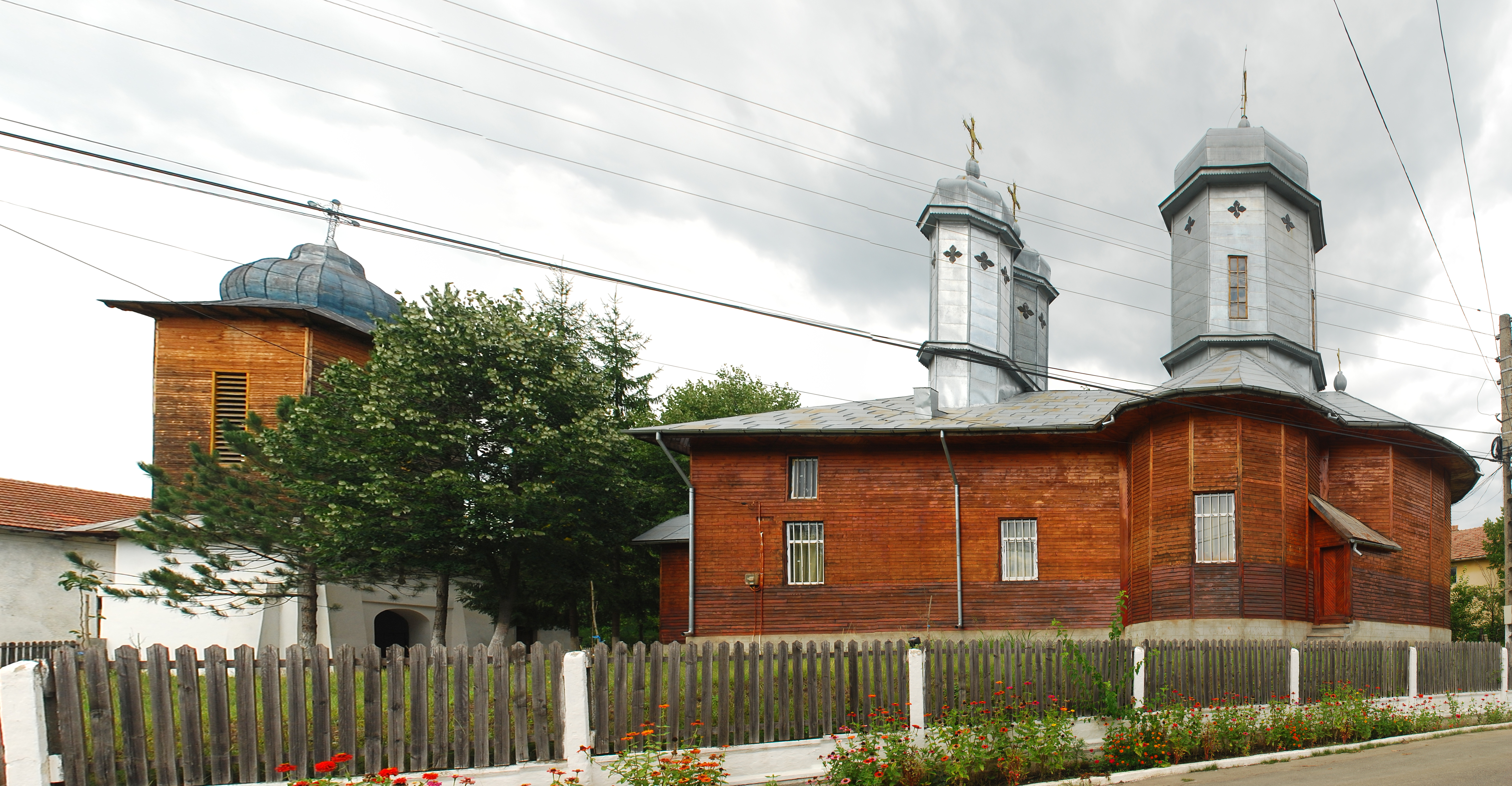
- Archangels' church in Bozioru

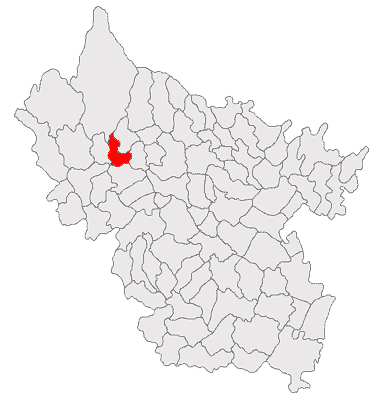
- Location in Buzău County

- Location in Romania
- Coordinates: 45°23′N 26°29′E
- Country: Romania
- County: Buzău
- Subdivisions: Bozioru, Buduile, Fișici, Găvanele, Gresia, Izvoarele, Nucu, Scăeni, Ulmet, Văvălucile

Government
  - Mayor (2020–2024): Valentin Grigore (PSD)
- Area: 36.79 km^{2} (14.20 sq mi)
- Elevation: 378 m (1,240 ft)
- Population (2021-12-01): 814
  - Density: 22.1/km^{2} (57.3/sq mi)
- Time zone: UTC+02:00 (EET)
  - Summer (DST): UTC+03:00 (EEST)
- Postal code: 127075
- Area code: +(40) 238
- Vehicle reg.: BZ
- Website: comunabozioru.ro

Bozioru is a commune in Buzău County, Muntenia, Romania. It comprises ten villages: Bozioru, Buduile, Fișici, Găvanele, Gresia, Izvoarele, Nucu, Scăeni, Ulmet, and Văvălucile.

Historical population
Year	Pop.	±%
2002	1,278	—
2011	1,161	−9.2%
2021	814	−29.9%
Source: Census data
