= Zărnești, Buzău =

Zărnești
- Commune
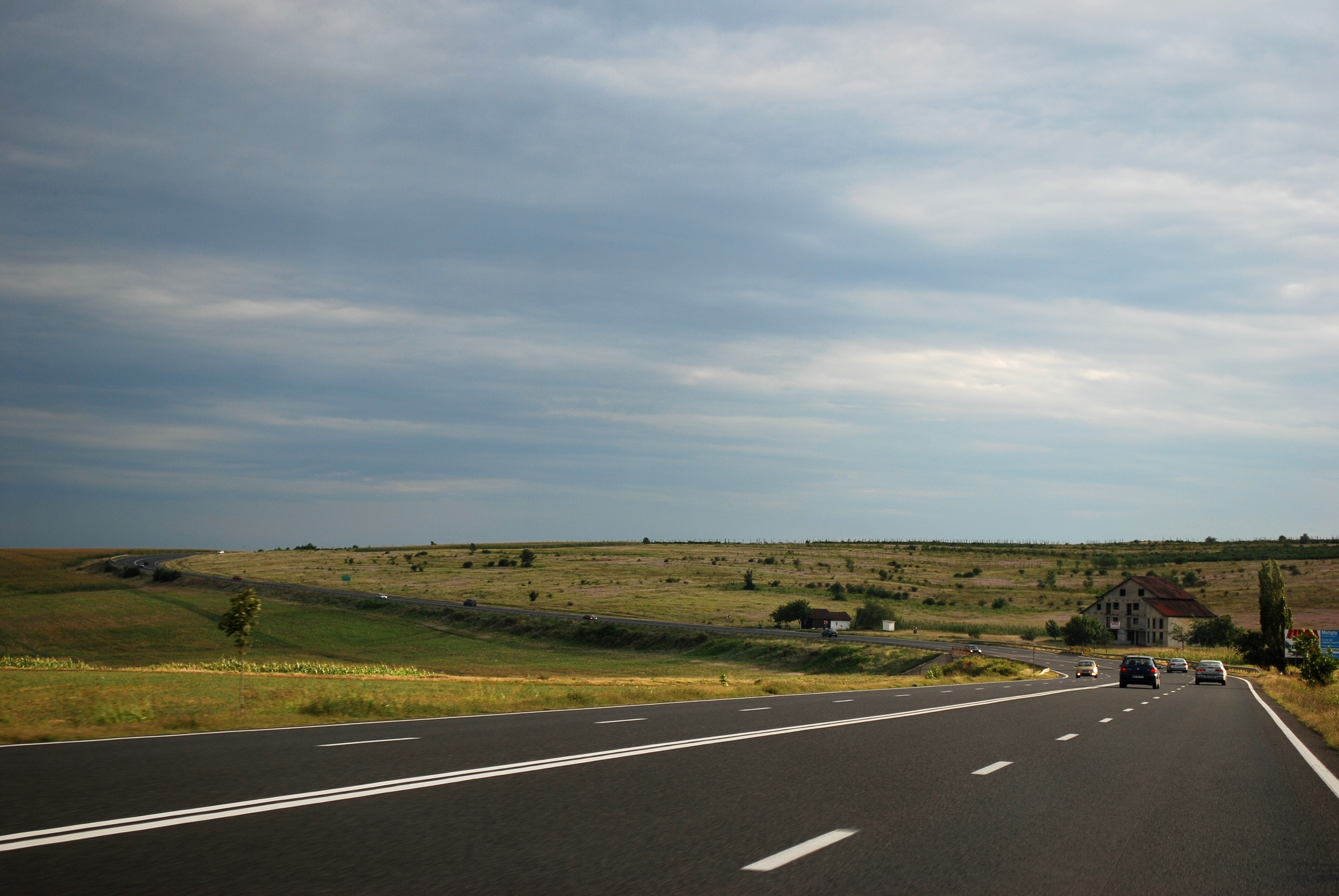
- View of the depopulated village of Comisoaia

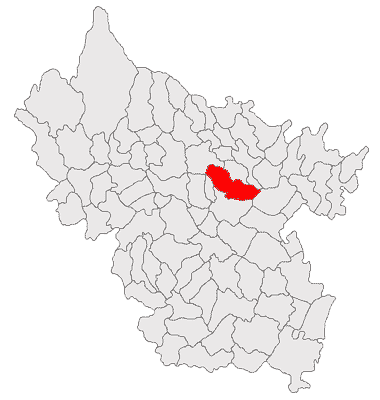
- Location in Buzău County

- Location in Romania
- Coordinates: 45°17′27″N 26°52′37″E
- Country: Romania
- County: Buzău
- Subdivisions: Comisoaia, Fundeni, Pruneni, Vadu Sorești and Zărnești

Government
  - Mayor (2020–2024): Sorin Matei (PMP)
- Area: 78.1 km^{2} (30.2 sq mi)
- Elevation: 178 m (584 ft)
- Population (2021-12-01): 4,676
  - Density: 59.9/km^{2} (155/sq mi)
- Time zone: UTC+02:00 (EET)
  - Summer (DST): UTC+03:00 (EEST)
- Postal code: 127715
- Area code: +(40) 238
- Vehicle reg.: BZ
- Website: primariazarnestibuzau.ro

Zărnești is a commune in Buzău County, Muntenia, Romania. It is composed of five villages: Comisoaia, Fundeni (the commune centre), Pruneni, Vadu Sorești, and Zărnești.

Historical population
Year	Pop.	±%
2002	5,531	—
2011	5,459	−1.3%
2021	4,676	−14.3%
Source: Census data

== Notes ==
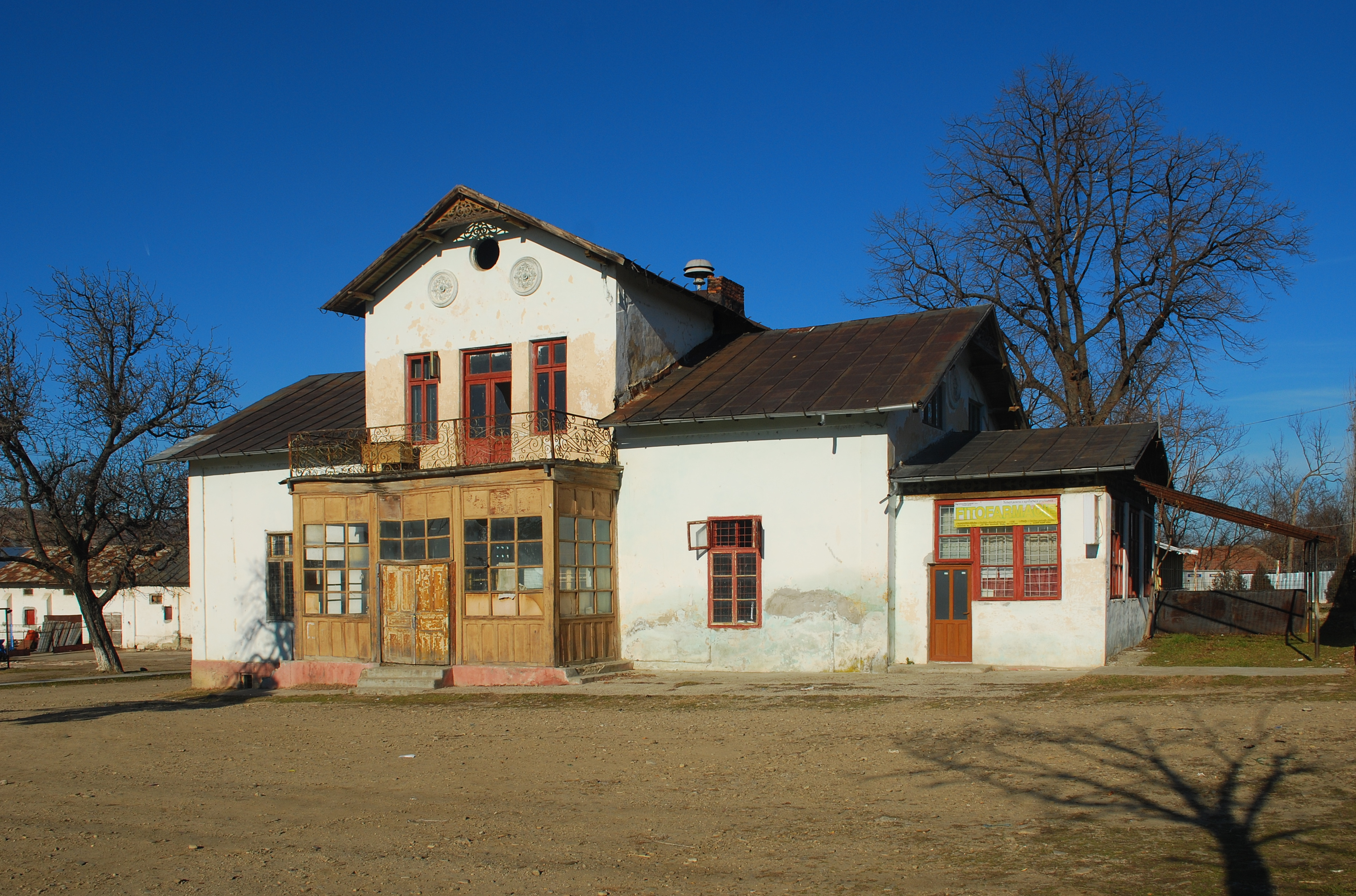
Marghiloman mansion in Fundeni
