= Cozieni =

- Commune
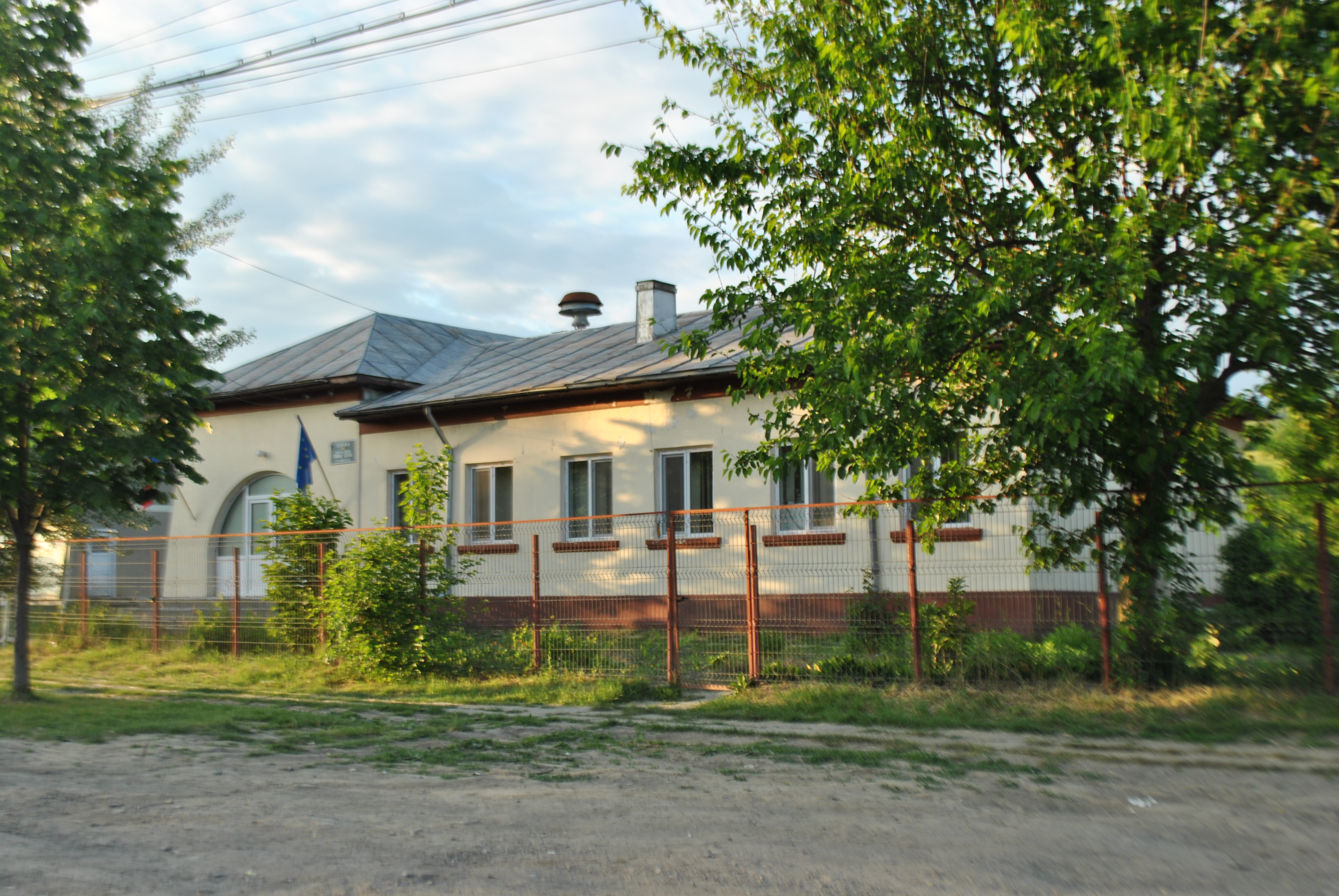
- Cozieni town hall

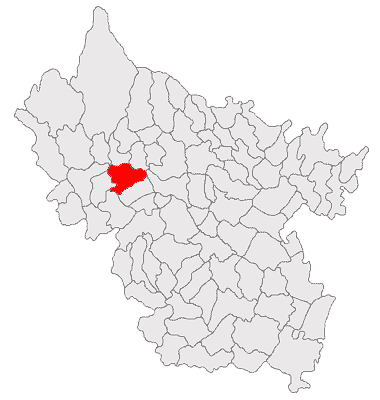
- Location in Buzău County

- Location in Romania
- Coordinates: 45°20′N 26°29′E
- Country: Romania
- County: Buzău
- Subdivisions: Anini, Bălănești, Bercești, Ciocănești, Cocârleni, Colțeni, Cozieni, Fața lui Nan, Gloduri, Izvoru, Lungești, Nistorești, Pietraru, Punga, Teiș, Trestia, Tulburea, Valea Banului, Valea Roatei, Zăpodia

Government
  - Mayor (2024–2028): Valerică-Robert Șomoiag (PNL)
- Area: 55.61 km^{2} (21.47 sq mi)
- Elevation: 264 m (866 ft)
- Population (2021-12-01): 1,747
  - Density: 31.42/km^{2} (81.37/sq mi)
- Time zone: UTC+02:00 (EET)
  - Summer (DST): UTC+03:00 (EEST)
- Postal code: 127210
- Area code: +(40) 238
- Vehicle reg.: BZ
- Website: www.primariacozieni.ro

Cozieni is a commune in Buzău County, Muntenia, Romania. It is composed of twenty villages: Anini, Bălănești, Bercești, Ciocănești, Cocârleni, Colțeni, Cozieni, Fața lui Nan, Gloduri, Izvoru, Lungești, Nistorești, Pietraru, Punga, Teiș, Trestia, Tulburea, Valea Banului, Valea Roatei, and Zăpodia.

Historical population
Year	Pop.	±%
2002	2,472	—
2011	2,139	−13.5%
2021	1,747	−18.3%
Source: Census data

== Notes ==
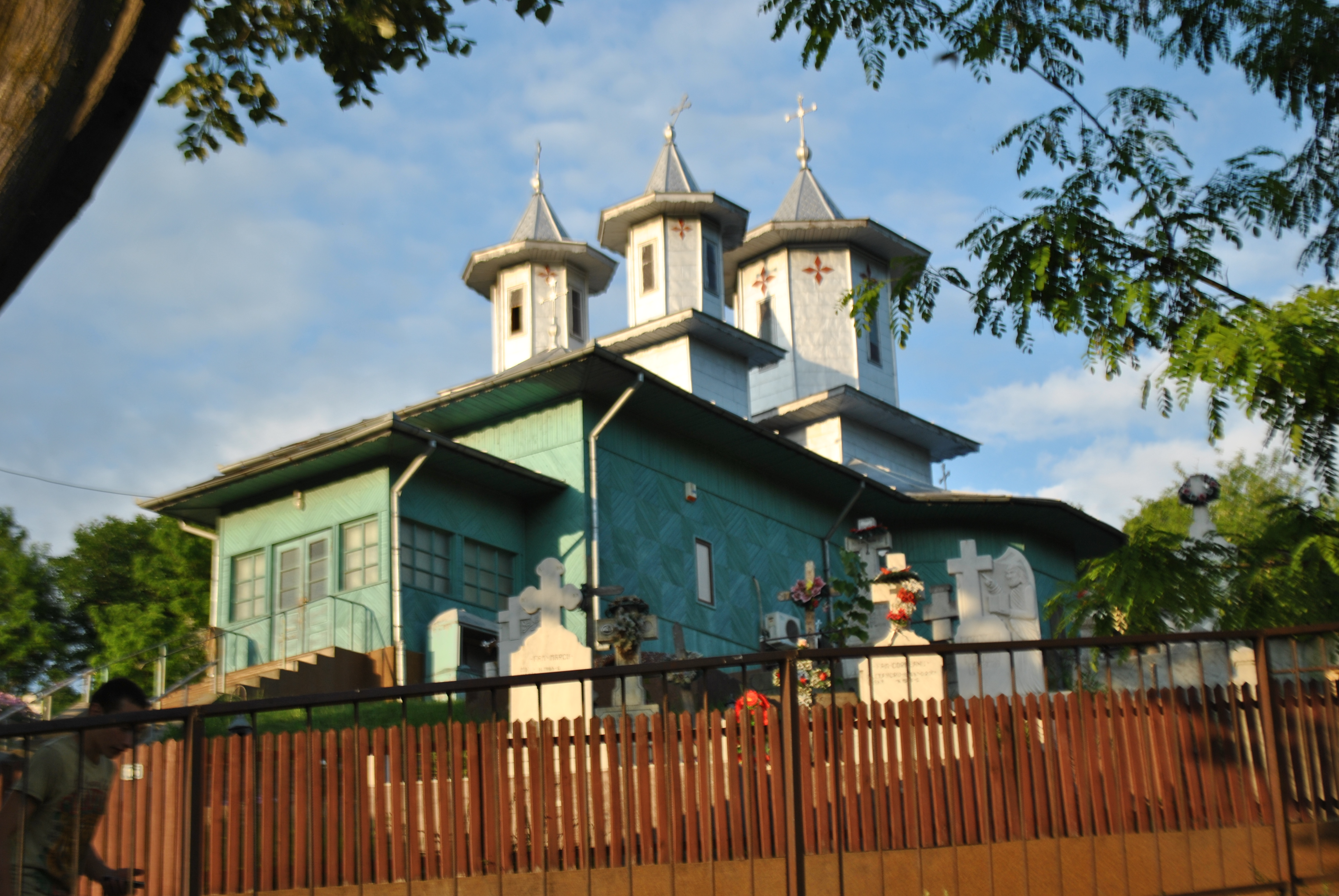
Archangels Church in Bălănești

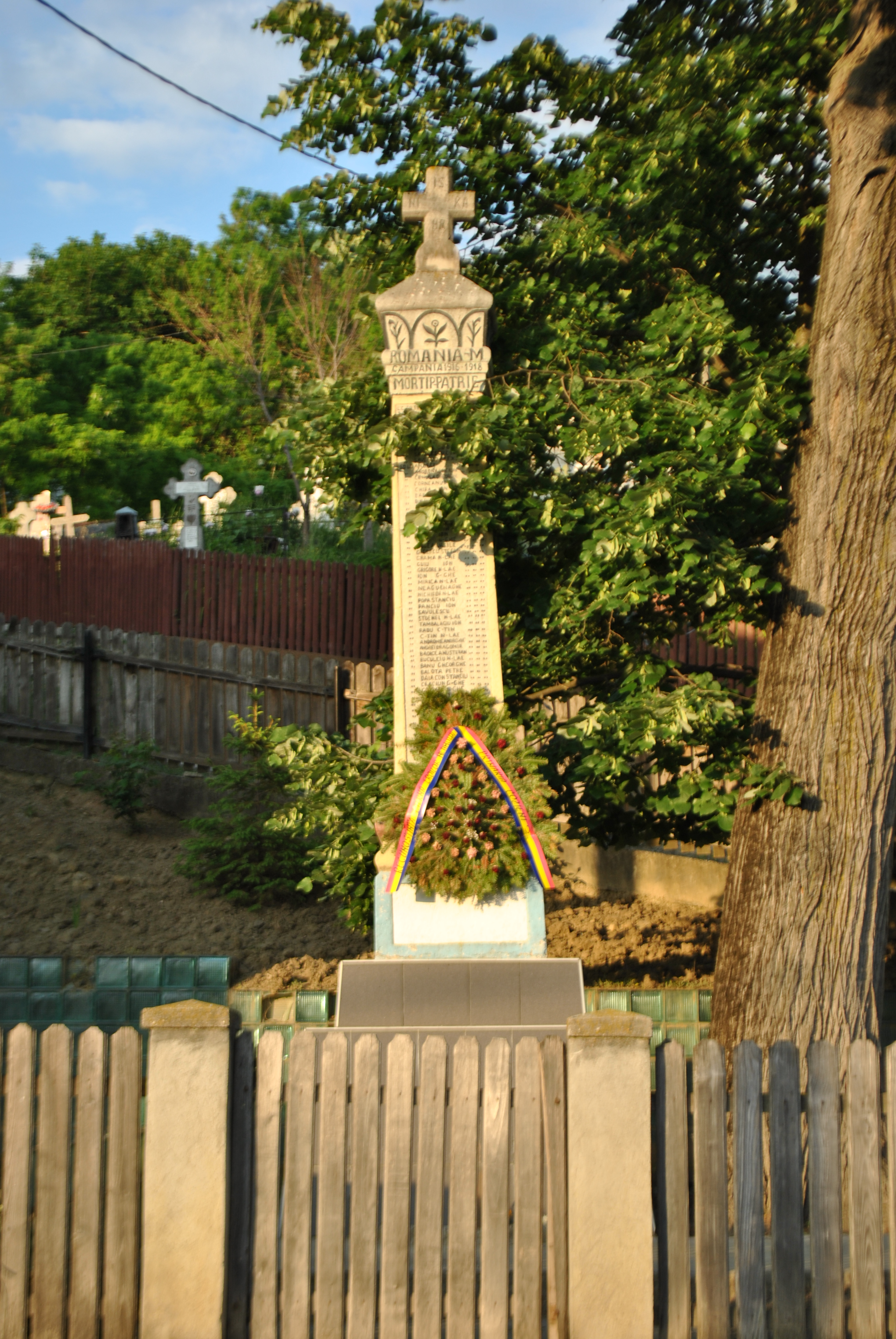
Heroes monument in Bălănești

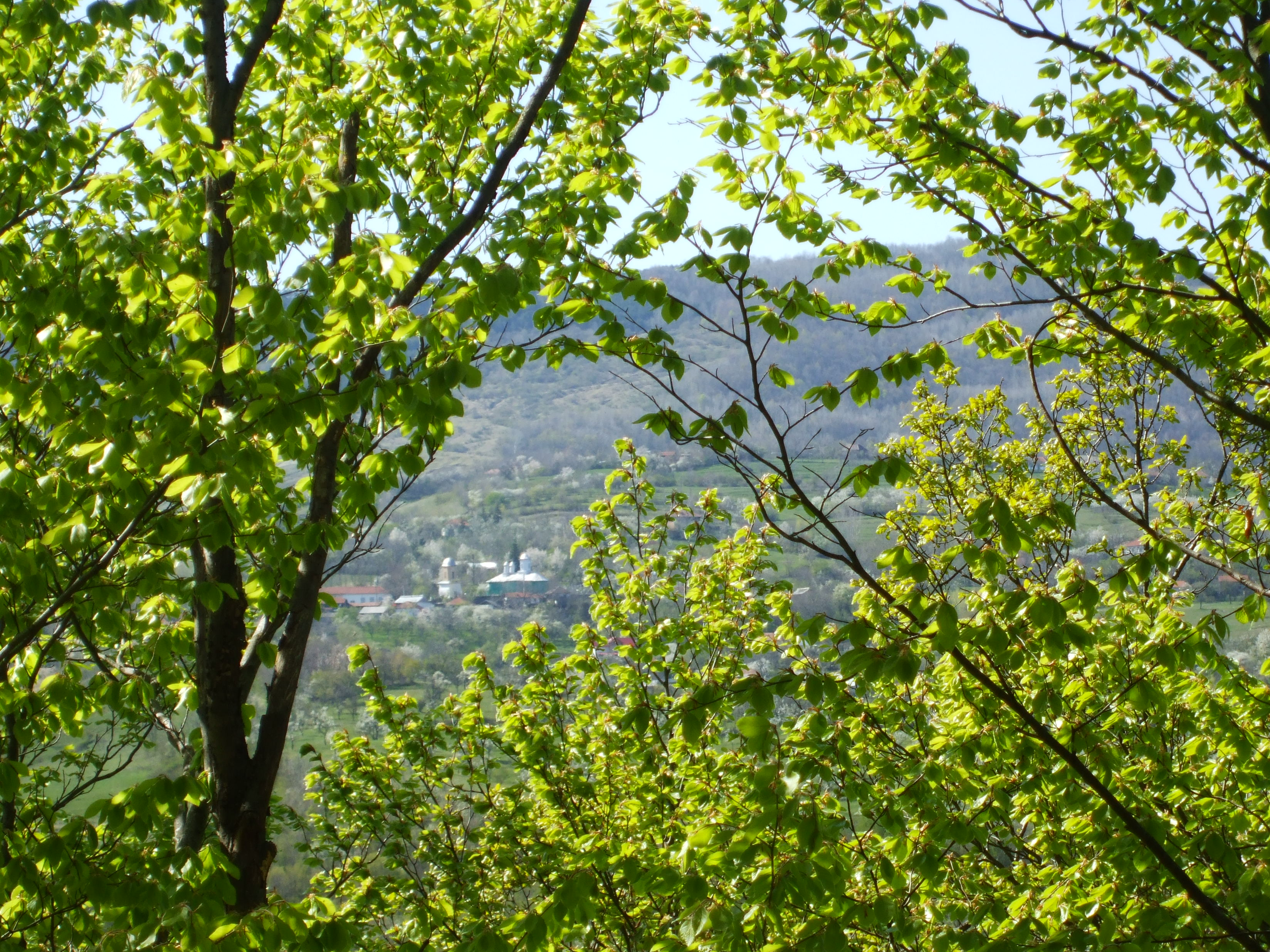
Pietraru
