= Urlătoarea (Prahova) =

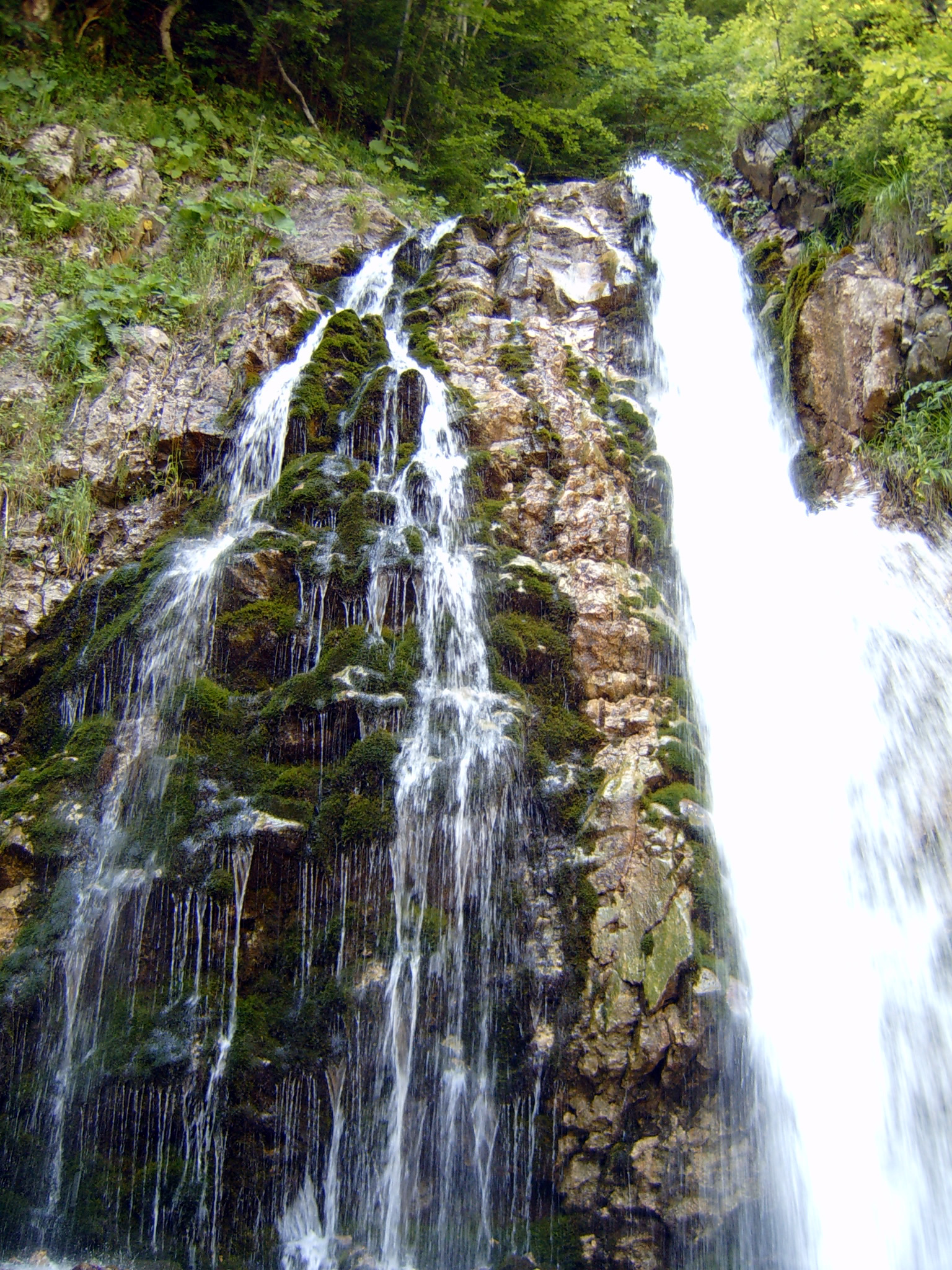

- Location within Romania

Location
- Country: Romania
- Counties: Prahova County

Physical characteristics
- Mouth: Prahova
  - location: Poiana Țapului
  - coordinates: 45.3948°N 25.5411°E

Basin features
- Progression: Prahova→ Ialomița→ Danube→ Black Sea
- Tributaries
  - left: Urlătoarea Mică
  - right: Urlătoarea Mare

The Urlătoarea is a right tributary of the river Prahova in Romania. It flows into the Prahova in Poiana Țapului. It is known for the Urlătoarea waterfall.
