= Vișani =

- Commune
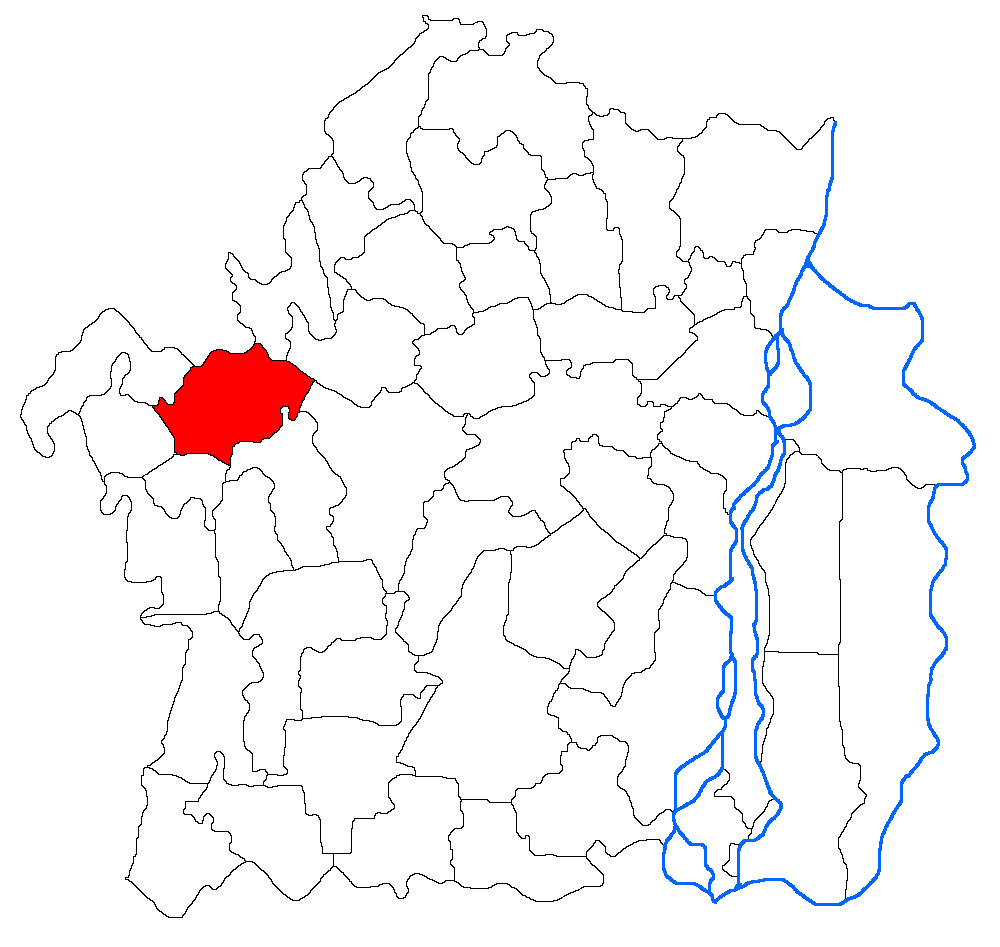
- Location in Brăila County

- Location in Romania
- Coordinates: 45°9′20″N 27°17′5″E
- Country: Romania
- County: Brăila
- Population (2021-12-01): 2,145
- Time zone: UTC+02:00 (EET)
  - Summer (DST): UTC+03:00 (EEST)
- Vehicle reg.: BR

Vișani is a commune in Brăila County, Muntenia, Romania. It is composed of three villages: Câineni-Băi, Plăsoiu and Vișani.
