= Siriul Mare =

- Location within Romania

Location
- Country: Romania
- Counties: Buzău County

Physical characteristics
- Mouth: Buzău
  - location: Siriu Reservoir
  - coordinates: 45.502°N 26.230°E
- Length: 15 km (9.3 mi)
- Basin size: 85 km^{2} (33 sq mi)

Basin features
- Progression: Buzău→ Siret→ Danube→ Black Sea

The Siriul Mare is a right tributary of the river Buzău in Romania. It discharges into the Siriu Reservoir, which is drained by the Buzău, near Gura Siriului. Its length is 15 km (9.3 mi) and its basin size is 85 km^{2} (33 sq mi).

== Tributaries ==
The following rivers are tributaries of the Siriul Mare (from source to mouth):

Left: Vâna Mălâei, Milea, Mreaja

Right: Morcovoaia, Siriul Mic, Roșia Mare, Molidu, Monteoru, Valea Popii, Vaca Mare, Vaca Mică
