= DN10 =

Road in Romania

National Road 10
- Drumul Național 10
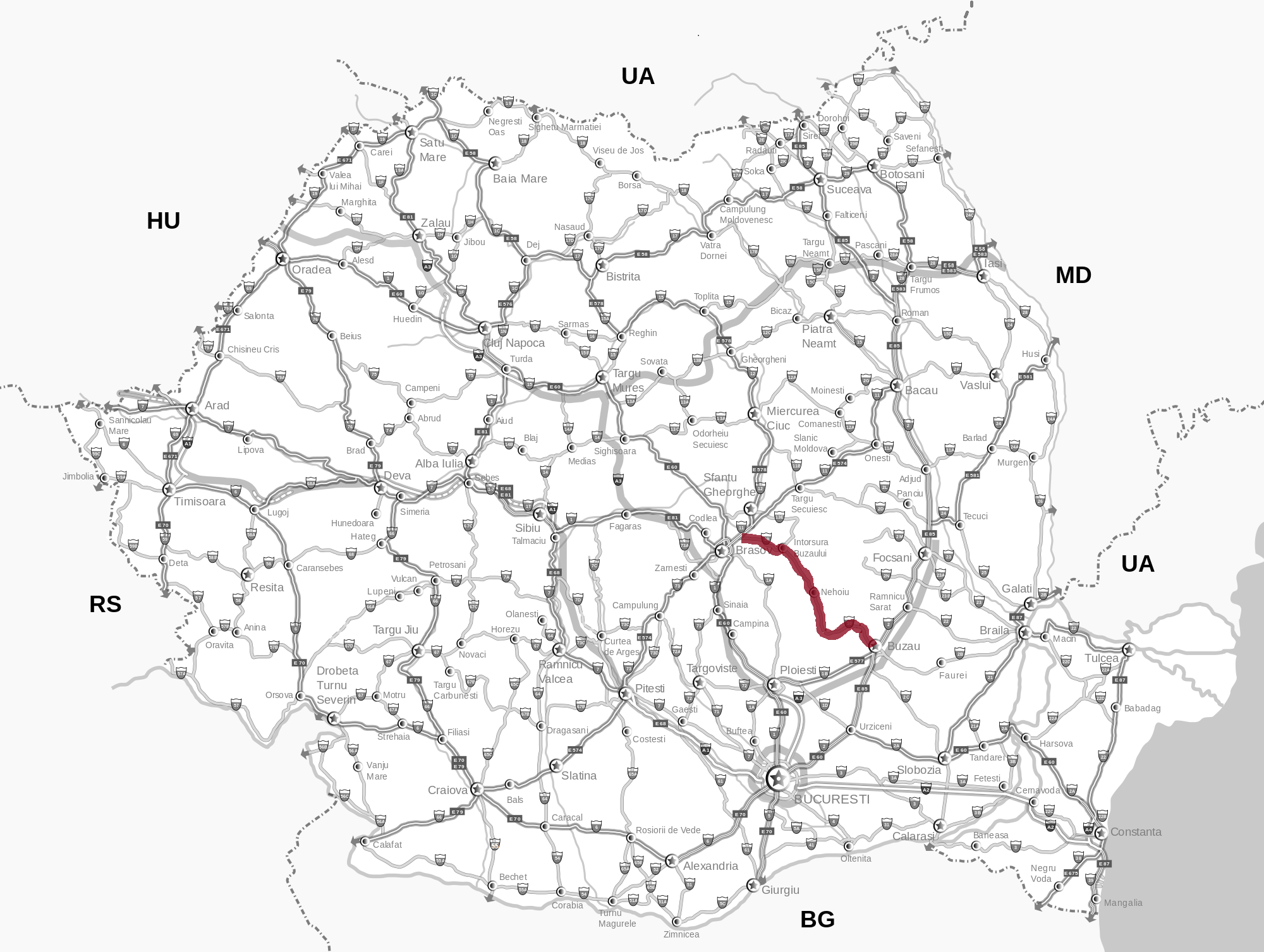

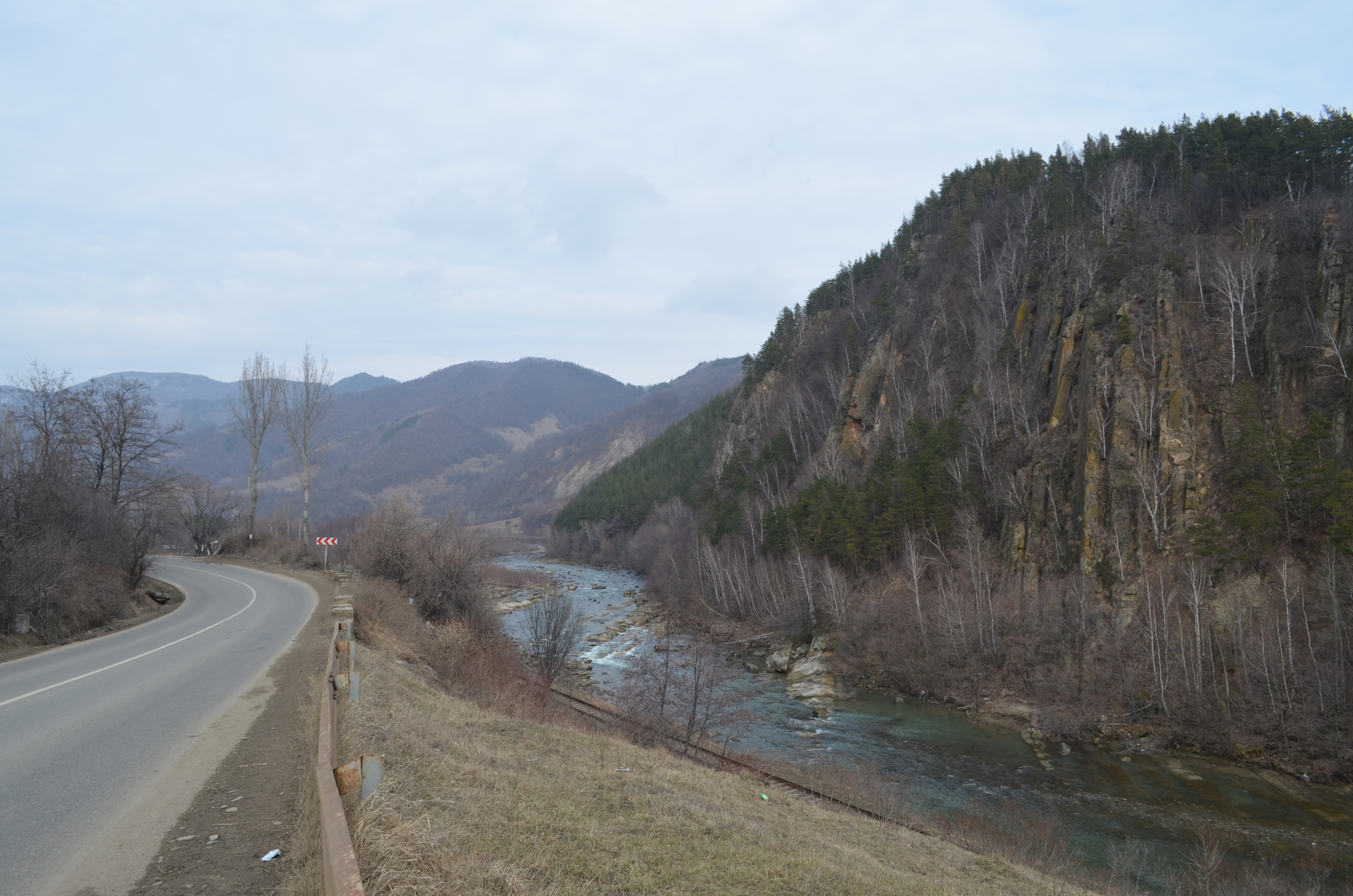

Route information
- Maintained by Compania Națională de Autostrăzi și Drumuri Naționale din România
- Length: 146.3 km (90.9 mi)

Major junctions
- From: Buzău
- To: Brașov

Location
- Country: Romania
- Counties: Buzău, Covasna, Brașov
- Major cities: Buzău, Brașov

Highway system
- Roads in Romania; Highways

DN10 (Romanian: Drumul Național 10) is a national road in Romania that runs from Buzău to Brașov, crossing the Carpathian Mountains through the Buzău Pass.

The road follows the Buzău River valley and is an important connection between Transylvania and the cities of south-eastern Romania.

== December 2006 landslide ==
On 16 December 2006, a massive landslide which occurred in the Siriu commune near kilometer 81 rendered DN10 unusable in that area, as some 5,000 m^{3} of dirt flooded the road. The road was cleared and became available again by 22 December, a week after the landslide occurred.

== Gallery ==
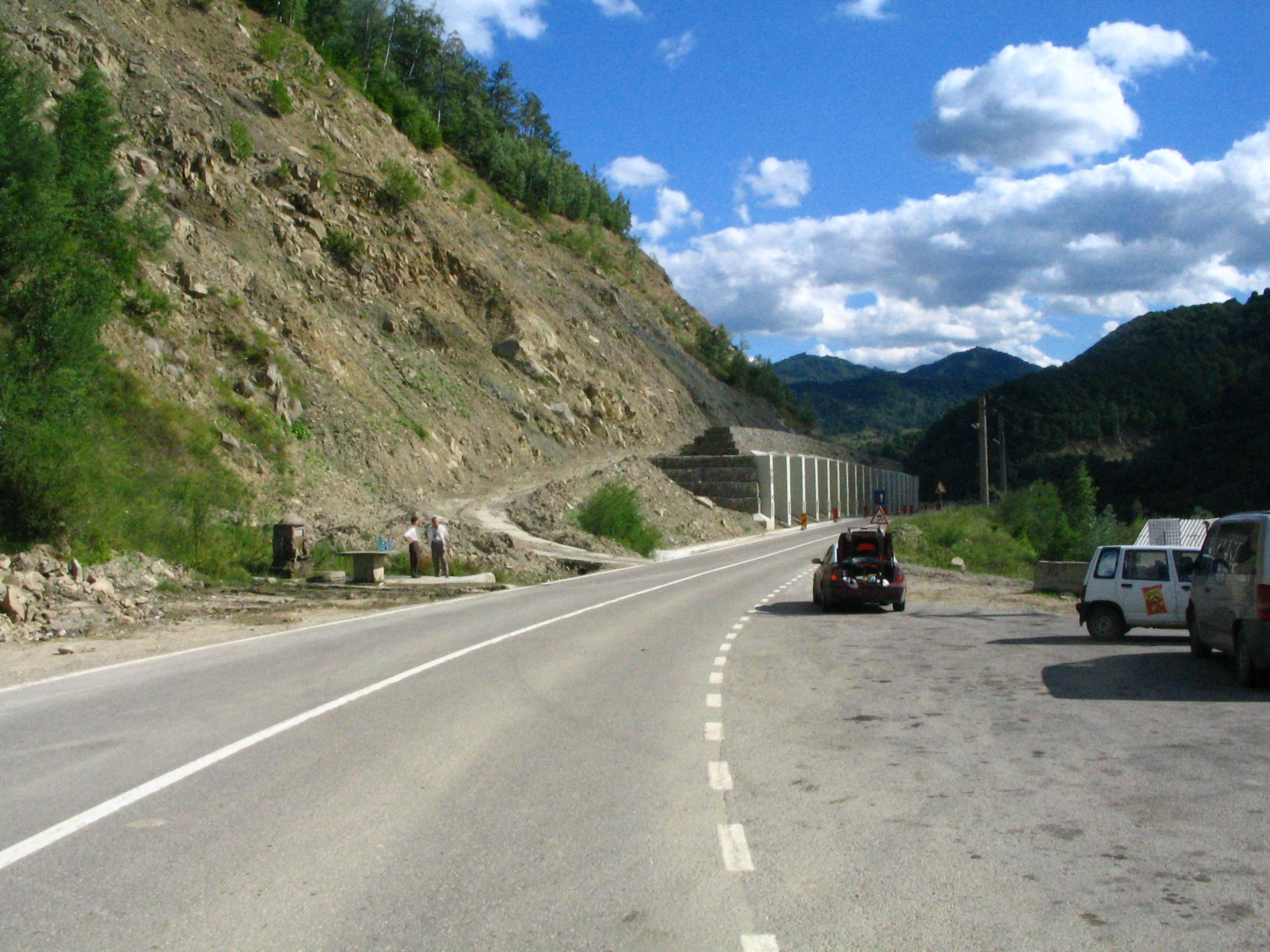
DN10 near Lake Siriu, the area of the December 2006 landslide

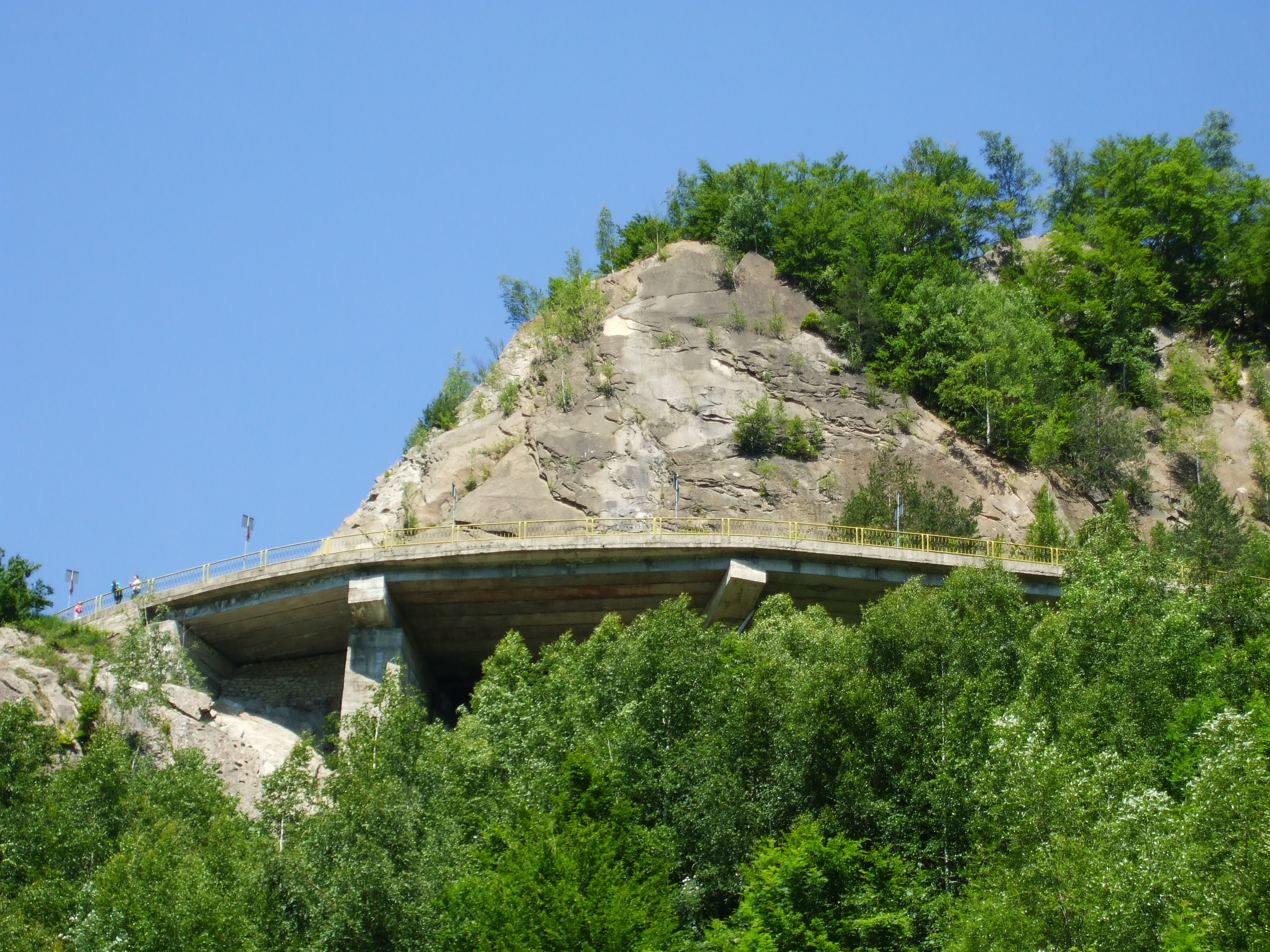
Teherău Viaduct in Siriu

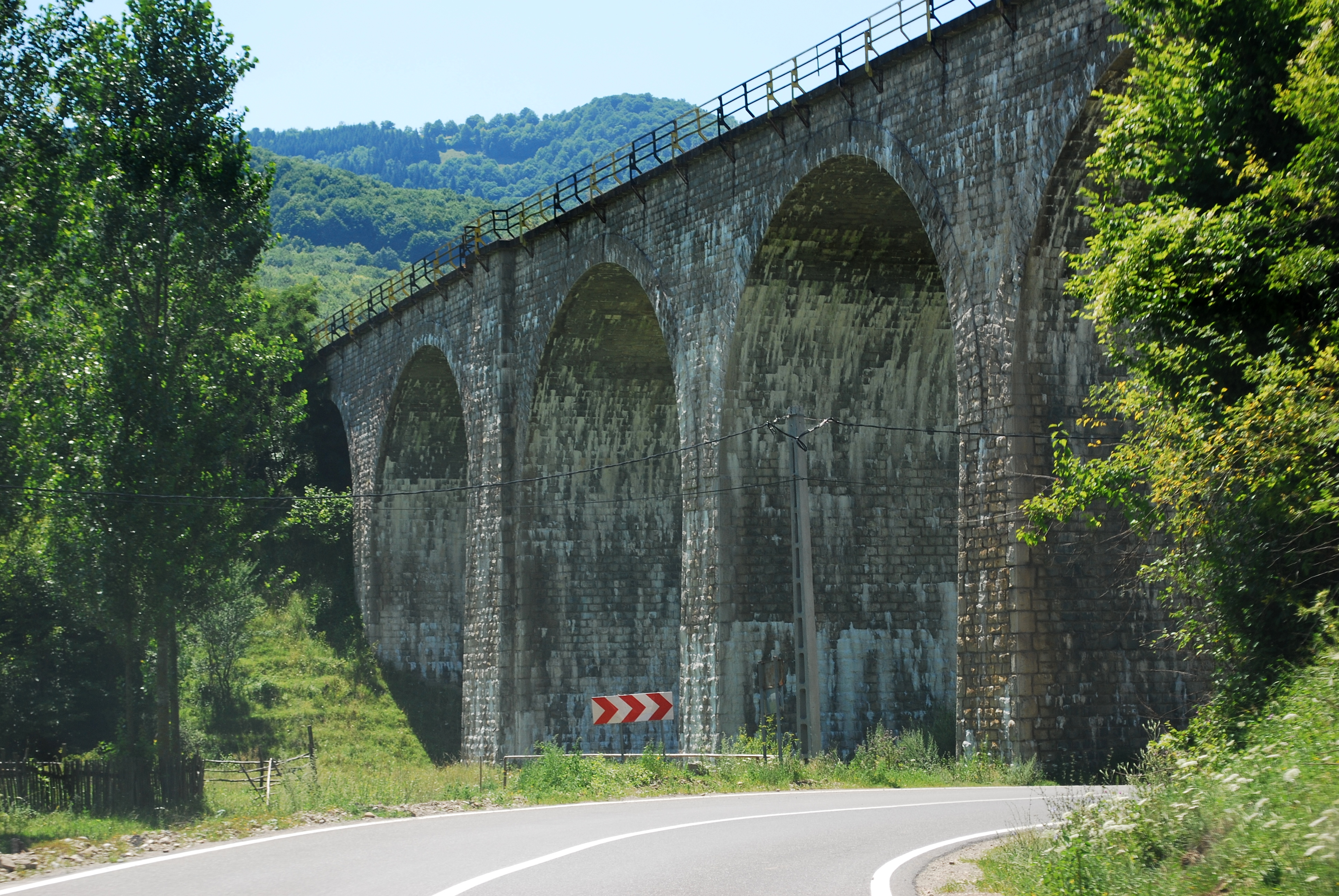
Viaduct over DN10 in Teliu
