= Buzău Pass =

Mountain pass in Romania

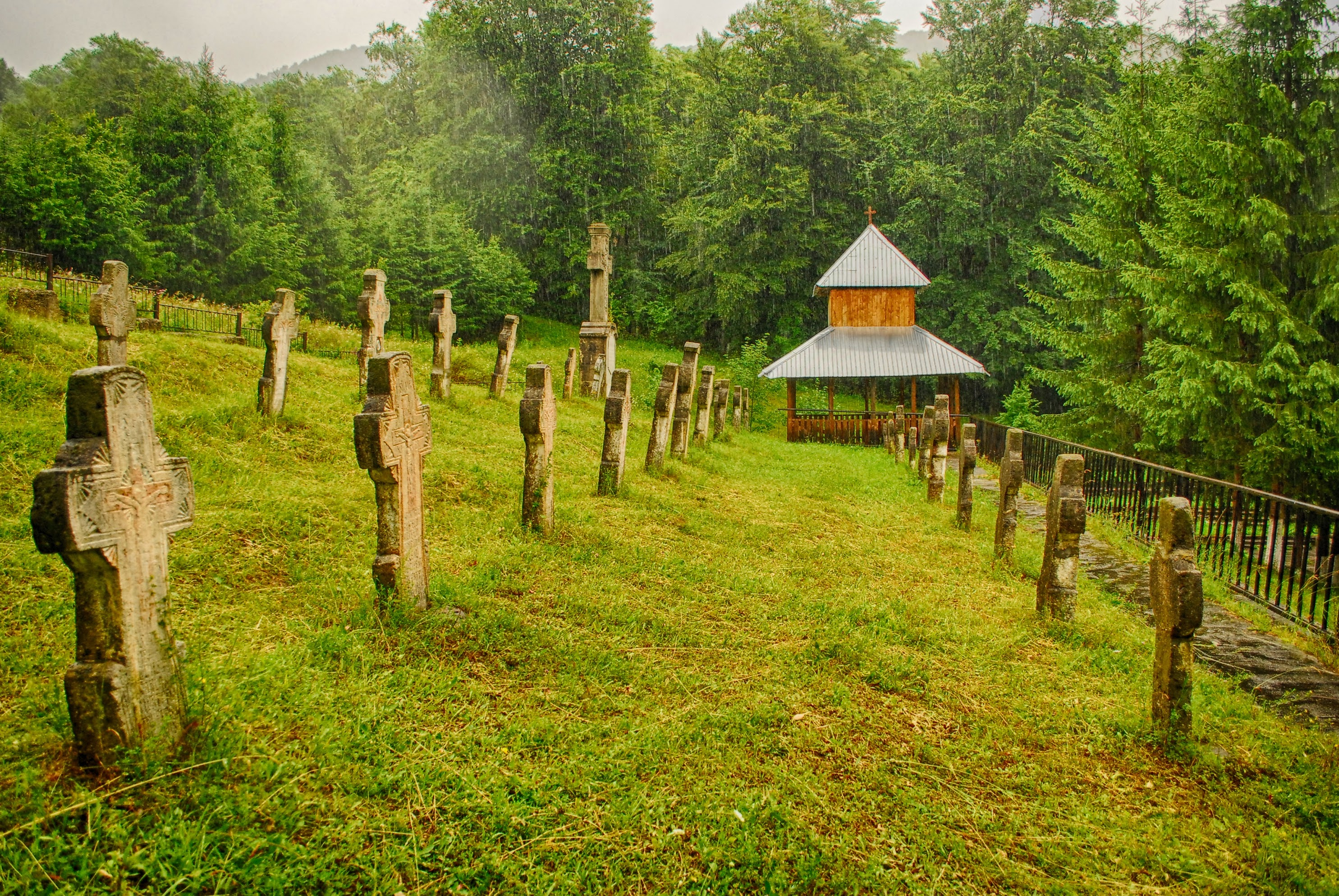
- World War I heroes' cemetery near Gura Siriului

- Location within Romania
- Elevation: 670 metres (2,200 ft)
- Traversed by: DN10

Third Approach
- Location: Romania
- Range: Buzău Mountains
- Coordinates: 45°33′56.93″N 26°10′14.42″E

Buzău Pass (Romanian: Pasul Buzău) is a mountain pass that follows the Buzău River and connects Brașov with Buzău over the Buzău Mountains, in the Eastern Carpathians in Romania.

== Geography ==
The pass is traversed by National Road DN10, from Crasna, in Covasna County, to Gura Siriului, in Buzău County. The road follows the course of the Buzău River; Lake Siriu is an artificial dam lake on the river, located at the southern end of the pass.

== History ==
The Buzău Pass was one of the passes used by invaders, such as Turks and Tatars, to attack Transylvania. This is why the nearby region, known as Țara Bârsei was settled by Teutonic Knights in the 13th century, who built fortifications, to be prepared against such an invasion. Nevertheless, many invasions were conducted through the Buzău Pass, including the Turkish attacks of 1421, 1432, 1438, and 1508, as well as the Tatar invasion of 1658. When Ottoman forces or other invaders would break through the pass, the village of Prejmer was the first place they encountered; the village was destroyed over 50 times between the 13th and 17th centuries, while the Prejmer fortified church was only rarely captured.

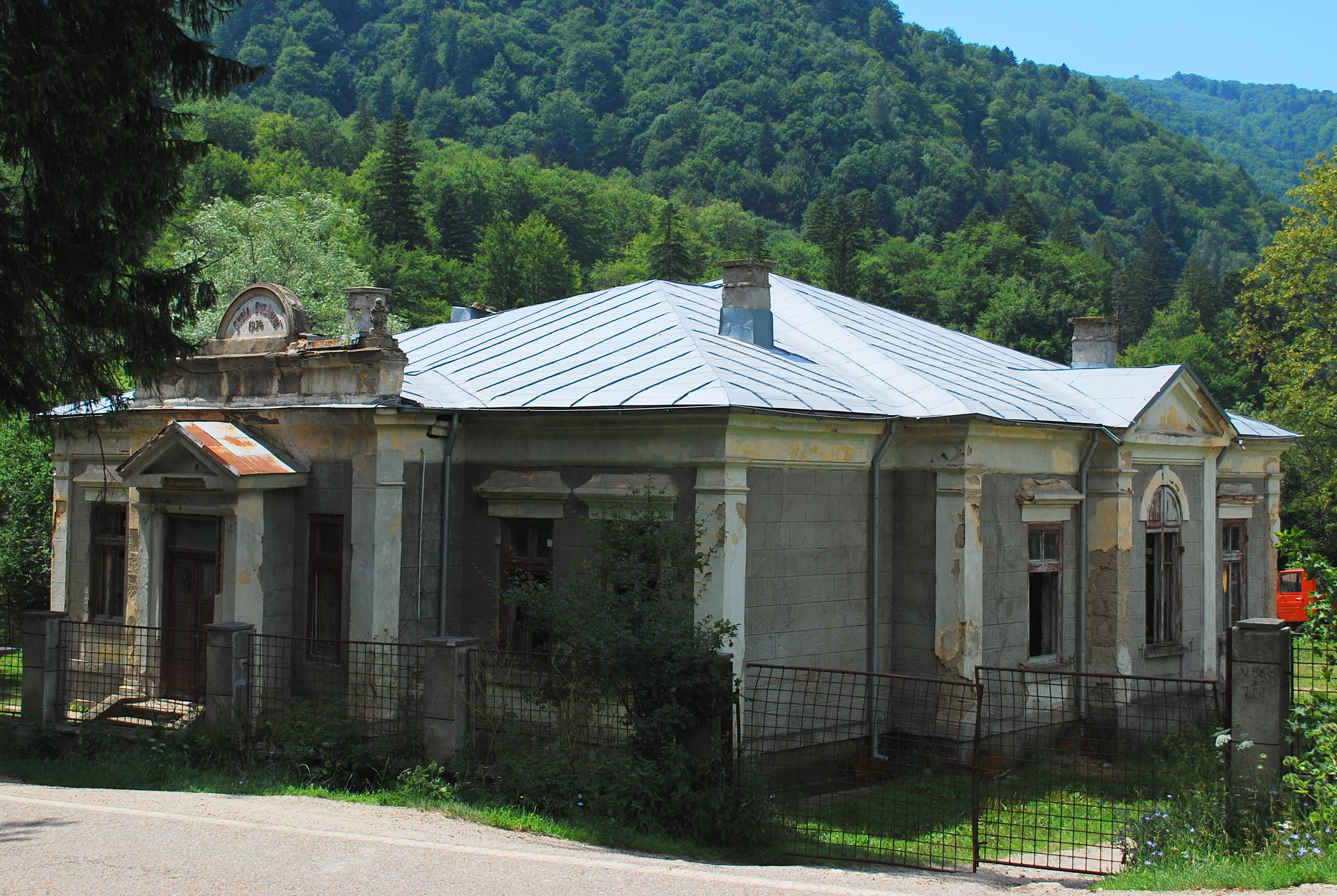
The Cheia Buzăului House, in Gura Siriului. Before World War I, this was the place where the border custom house was located.

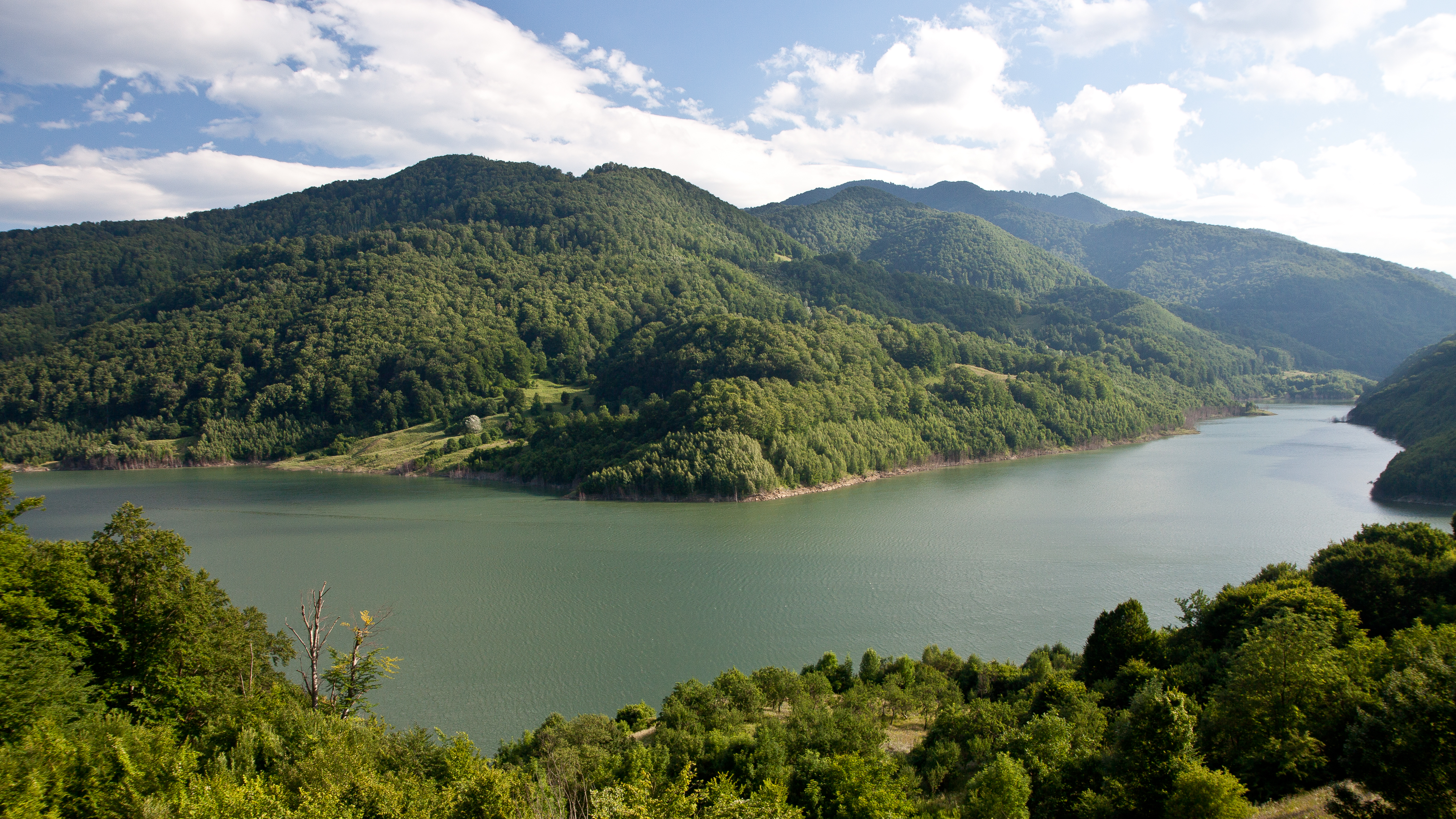
Lake Siriu

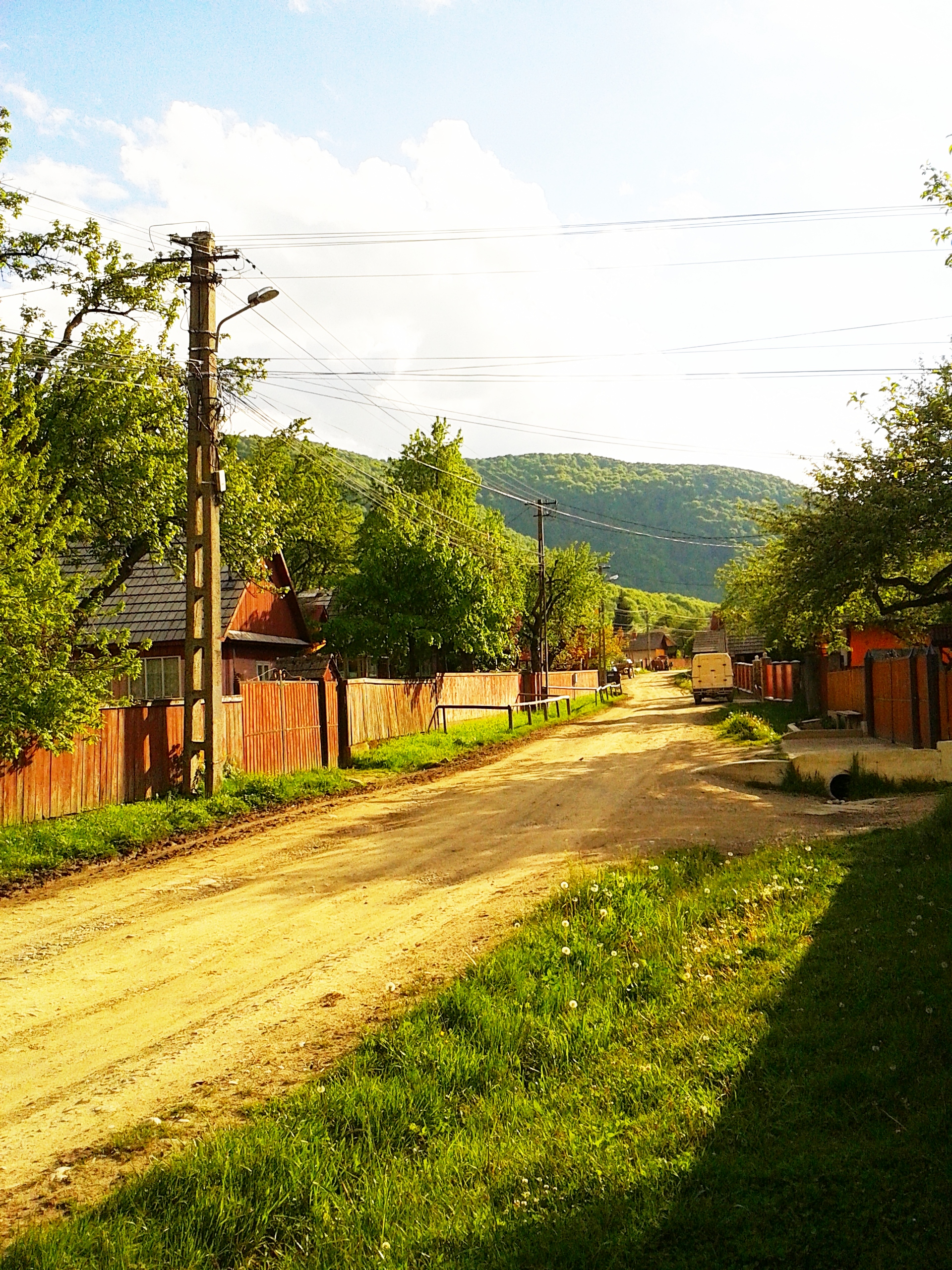
View from Crasna
