= Buzău (disambiguation) =

Buzău is a town, in the east of Romania.

Buzău may also refer to:

- Buzău County, a county in the east of Romania
- Buzău River, a river in the east of Romania, flowing through Buzău County
- Buzău Pass, a pass in the Eastern Carpathians mountain range, along the Buzău River, linking Transylvania with Moldavia
- Buzău Mountains, Romania
- Urmuz (1883–1923), pseudonymous Romanian writer, known in real life as Ionescu-Buzeu or Demetrescu-Buzău
