= Textila Stadium =

Stadium in Romania

Stadionul Textila
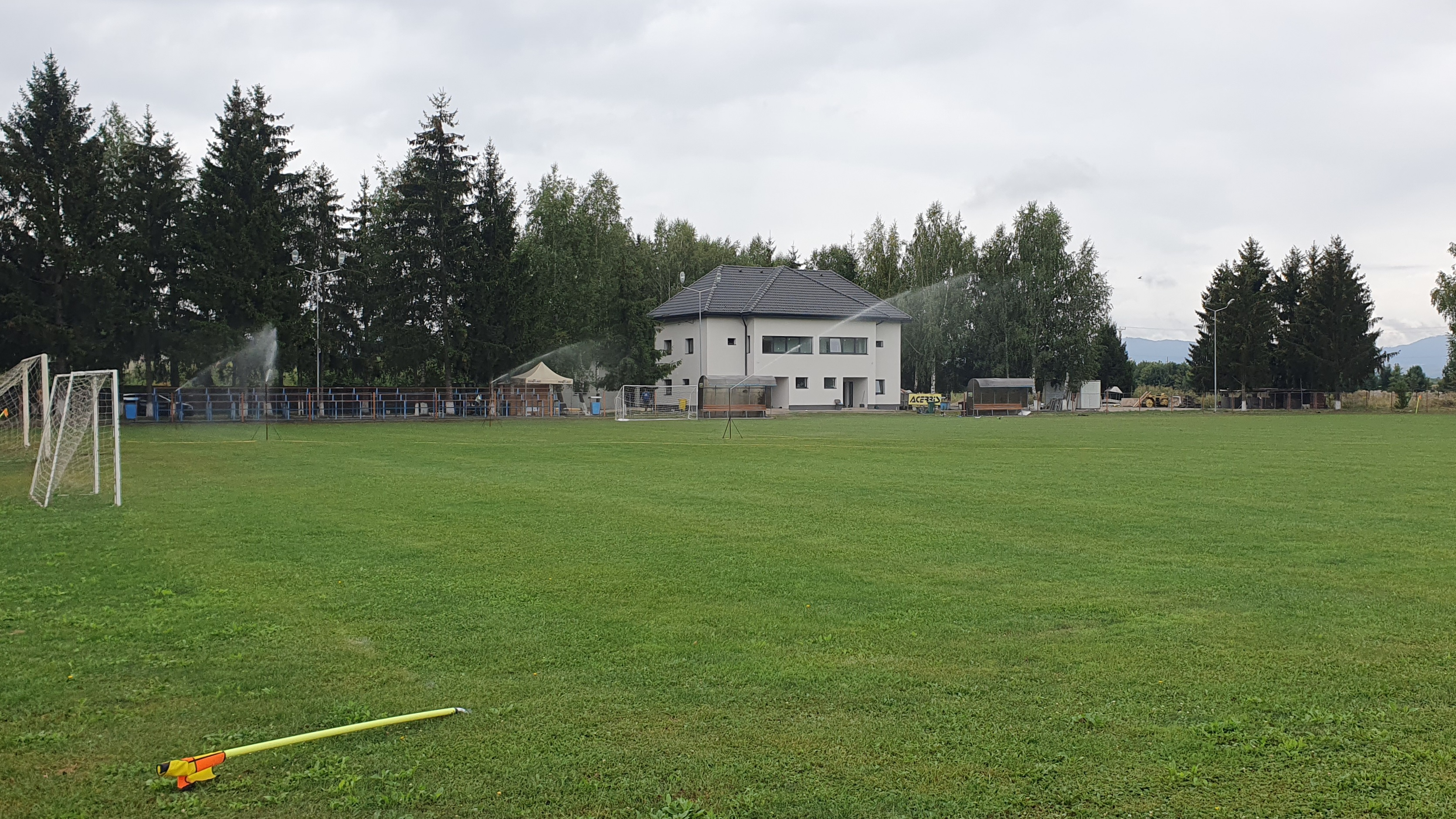
- Interactive map of Stadionul Textila
- Address: Str. Pictor Iacob Brujan
- Location: Lunca Câlnicului, Romania
- Coordinates: 45°44′52.2″N 25°46′33.2″E
- Owner: Commune of Prejmer
- Operator: ACS Prejmer
- Capacity: 200 seated
- Surface: Grass

Construction
- Opened: 1980s

Tenants
- Textila Prejmer; ACS Prejmer (2011–present)

Textila Stadium is a multi-purpose stadium in Lunca Câlnicului, Prejmer, Romania. It is currently used mostly for football matches, has a capacity of 200 seats and is the home ground of ACS Prejmer.
