= Bottomless Lake =

Bottomless Lake may refer to:

- Bottomless Lakes State Park in New Mexico, U.S., its oldest state park
- Bottomless Lake (Oregon), a dry lake in central Oregon, U.S., once part of Summer Lake (Oregon)
- Lake Manitoba, a lake in Manitoba, Canada

== Other ==
- Grundloser See in Germany; grundloser see is German for bottomless lake
- Lacul Fără Fund in Romania; lacul fără fund is Romanian for the bottomless lake
