= Prejmer fortified church =

Lutheran fortified church in Prejmer, Romania

Prejmer Fortified Church Biserica fortificată din Prejmer
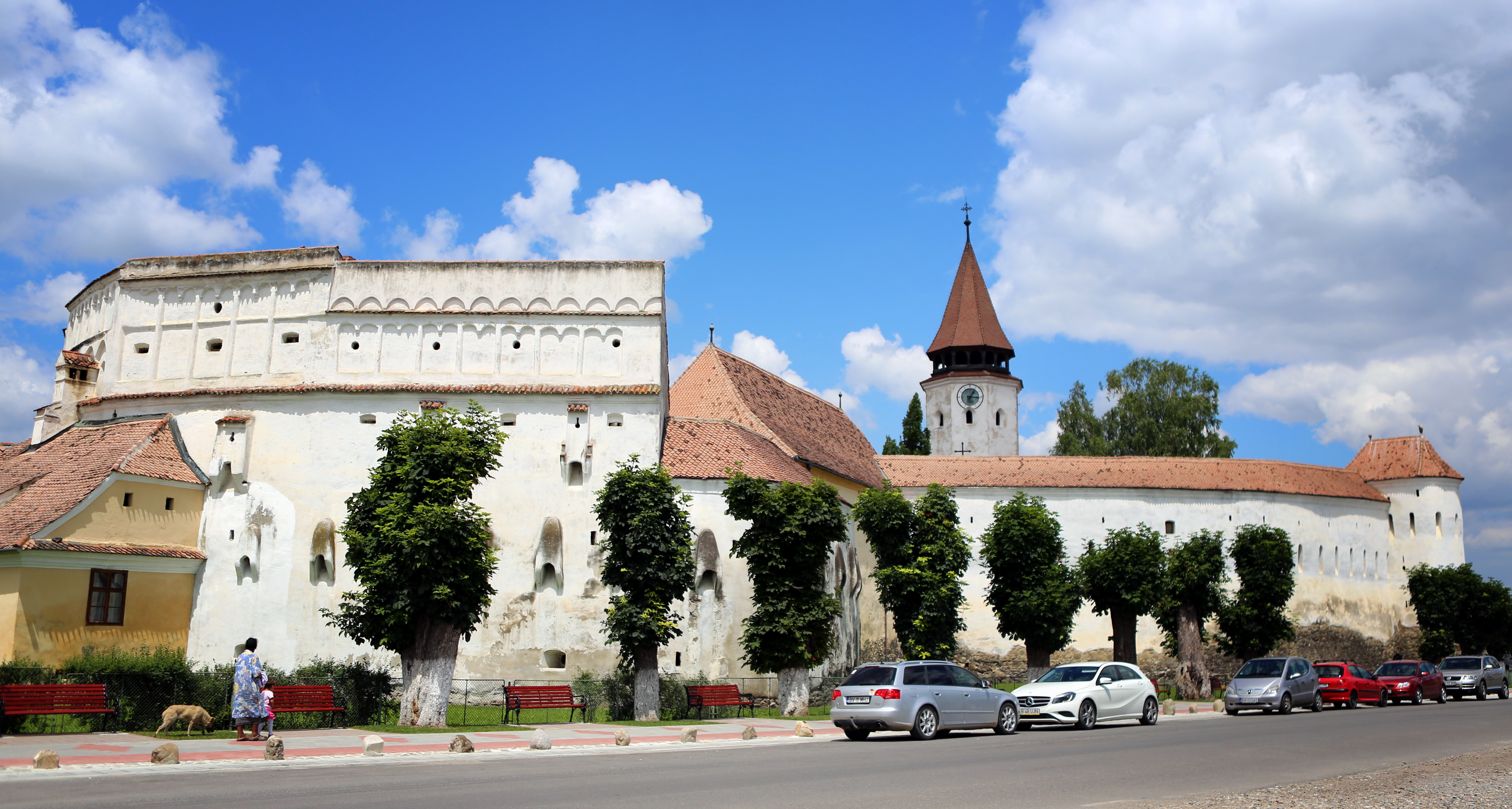

Religion
- Affiliation: Lutheran

Location
- Location: Prejmer, Romania
- Interactive map of Prejmer Fortified Church; Biserica fortificată din Prejmer
- Coordinates: 45.7220793°N 25.7734555°E

Architecture
- Type: Fortified church
- Style: Romanesque
- Groundbreaking: 1211
- Completed: 1240
- UNESCO World Heritage Site
- Official name: Villages with fortified churches in Transylvania
- Type: Cultural
- Criteria: iv
- Designated: 1993 (17th session); 1999 (23rd session – Extension)
- Reference no.: 596
- State Party: Romania
- Region: Europe and North America
- Monument istoric
- Official name: Historic monuments in Sibiu County
- Type: architectural
- Reference no.: LMI Code: BV-II-a-A-11745 (RAN Code: 41676.12)

The Prejmer fortified church (Romanian: Biserica fortificată din Prejmer; German: Kirchenburg von Tartlau) is a Lutheran fortified church in Prejmer (Tartlau), Brașov County, in the Transylvania region of Romania and the ethnographic area of Țara Bârsei. The church was founded by the Germanic Teutonic Knights, and then was eventually taken over by the Transylvanian Saxon community. Initially Roman Catholic, it became Lutheran following the Reformation. Together with the surrounding village, the church forms part of the villages with fortified churches in Transylvania UNESCO World Heritage Site.

== Description ==
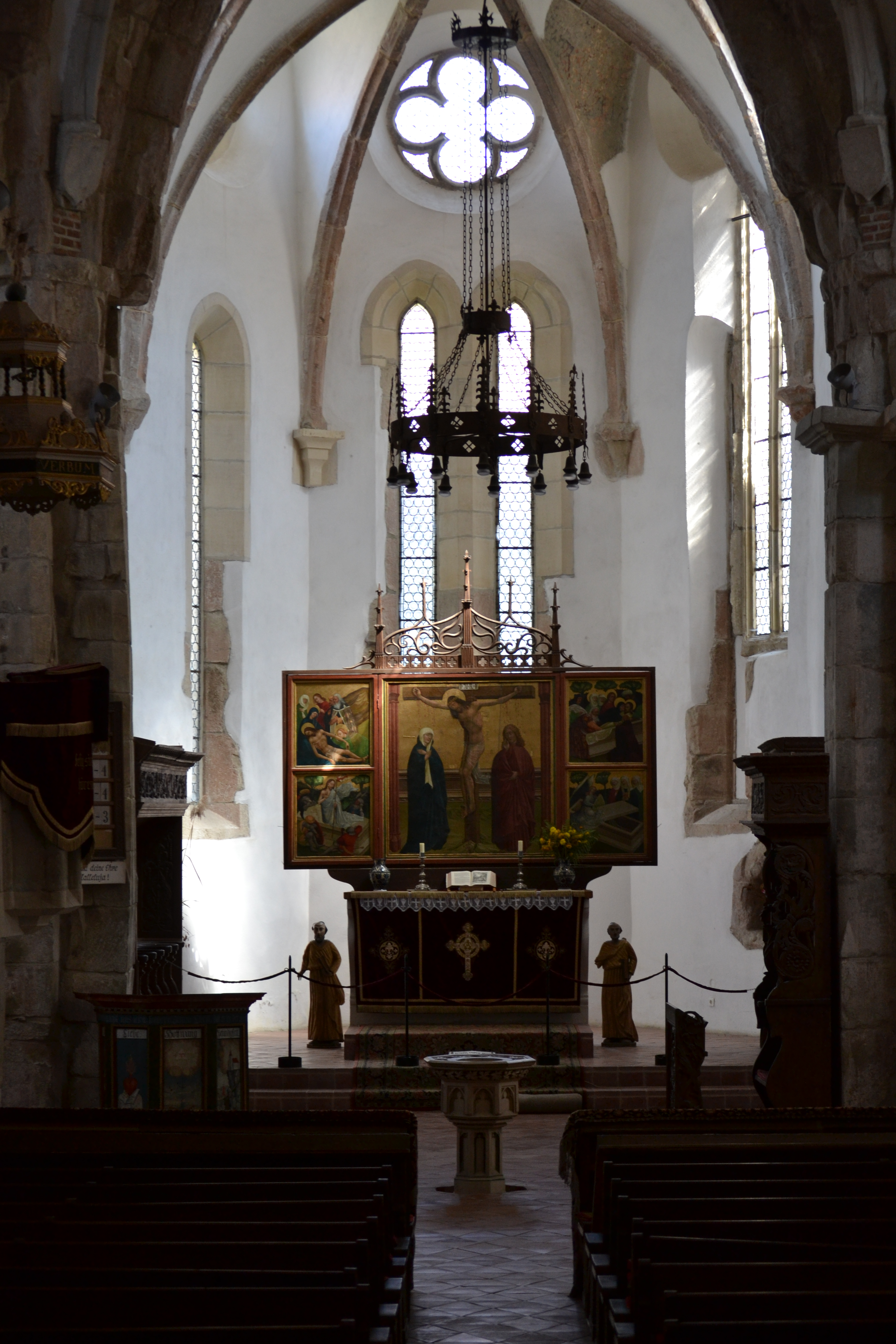
Interior

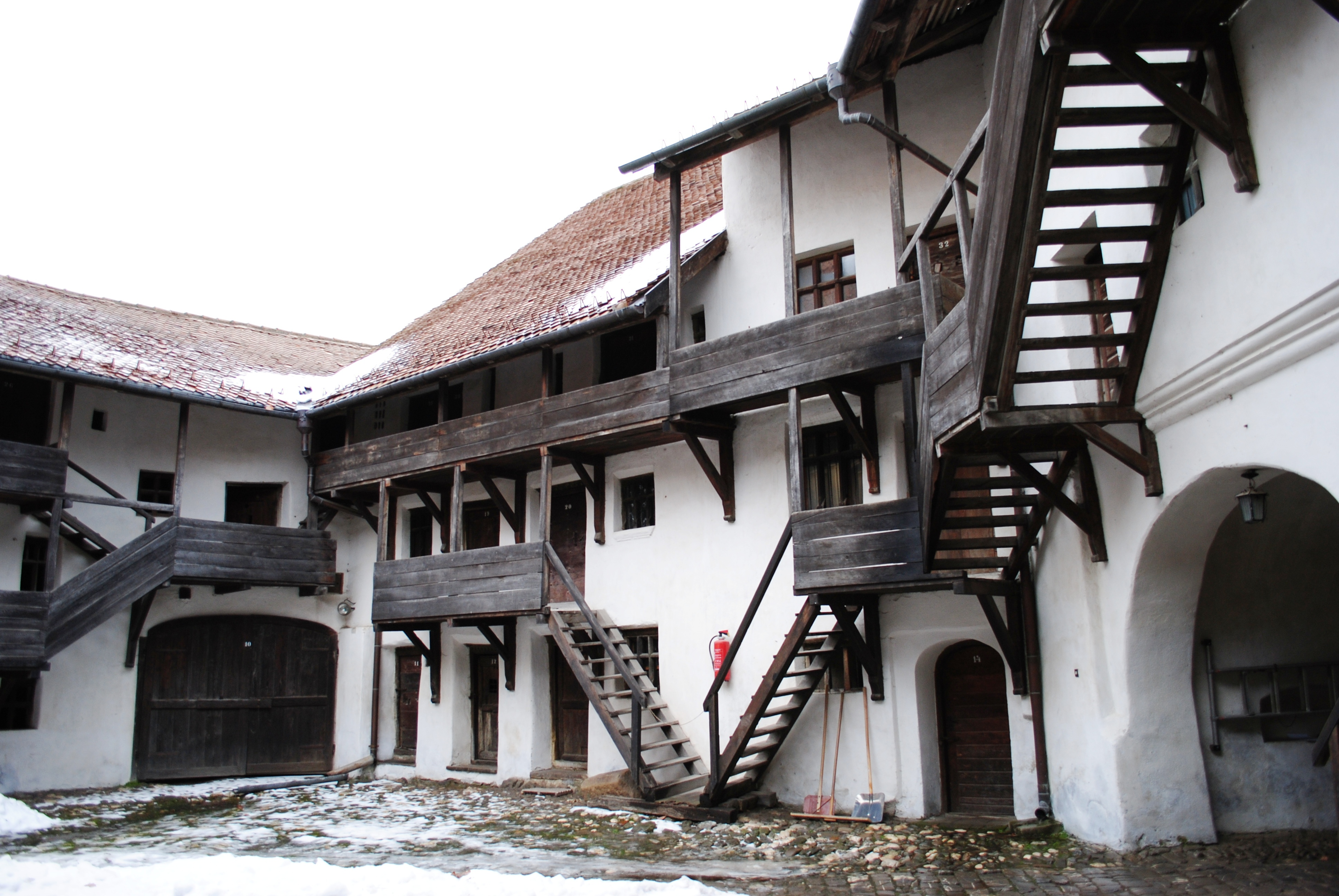
Barbican

=== Background and church ===
Around 1211, King Andrew II of Hungary permitted the knights to settle around Prejmer, where they began constructing a church in 1218, in Gothic style. They were responsible for the Greek cross plan, the only one of its kind in Transylvania, but found in a few churches in northeast Germany. Following their expulsion in 1225, the Cistercians, who took over in 1240, finished the church.

The triptych altarpiece, the oldest in the province, dates to around 1450; the main panel is joined to side panels painted on both faces, on two levels. The entire piece depicts scenes from the Passion of Christ. The Crucifixion is the central subject, four times the size of the other panels, over half this panel is gilt. The front side panels show the Washing of the Feet, the Last Supper, the Flagellation and the Judgement of Caiaphas; the rear has the Weeping Women, the Entombment, the Resurrection and the Myrrhbearers. The figures are simple and reduced to their essentials, their movements restrained or even statuesque, their clothing unruffled. The backgrounds are cursory, with the interiors showing only slight attention to geometric perspective. The colors are vivid, with the reds given a particular glow by the gilt background. The artist is unknown but was presumably trained in the Viennese school. A bell tower was added above the center of the church in 1461. The Greek cross shape was modified between 1512 and 1515: two side naves of unequal size were added while the main one was extended. The interior is simple and does not have traces of frescoes, while 19th century paintings were removed during restoration.

=== Fortifications and recognition ===
When Ottoman forces or other invaders would break through the Buzău Pass, Prejmer was the first place they encountered; the village was destroyed over 50 times between the 13th and 17th centuries, while the church was only rarely captured. Due to this strategic position, the church was strongly fortified in the 15th-16th centuries. After Sigismund of Luxemburg ordered defensive systems to be built in Țara Bârsei, high, strong walls were built and surrounded with a water-filled moat. It seems that a tunnel linked the church to the exterior. The circular walls are up to 5 m (16 ft) thick and reach nearly 12 m (39 ft) in height. The circular walls surround the church, while a second and smaller wall sits atop the arched passage at the entrance gate. Other defensive features include five towers and a battlement. On the interior side of the wall, there are four levels containing rooms and storage space and backed by the battlement. The over 270 rooms could offer shelter to some 1600 villagers in case of attack. Entry into the complex is made through a 30 m (98 ft) long tunnel protected by a portcullis with wooden grilles strengthened by iron and powerful oak doors. To the right of the entrance stands a large barbican. At Prejmer, you can also find the organ of death, a killer instrument. This medieval instrument is a piece of wood with 5 shotguns on each side, that by turning, becomes a true machine-gun. It was responsible for creating a lot of damage in the enemy’s camp.

Frequently damaged or altered, with the last stage of extensions and modifications happening in the 18th century, Prejmer was restored to its original form following a restoration between 1960 and 1970. The site is now a museum, visitors can see some of the wall rooms, climbing the many stairs and walking the corridors that join them along the wall, eventually reaching the battlements on the outside. In 1999, Prejmer, together with five other places, was added to the already-listed Biertan to form the villages with fortified churches in Transylvania UNESCO World Heritage Site. Additionally, the church is listed as a historic monument by Romania's Ministry of Culture and Religious Affairs, with the following being listed as separate entries: the inner wall and rooms, the outer wall, the barbican, the battlement and the arched gallery.

Prejmer fortified church

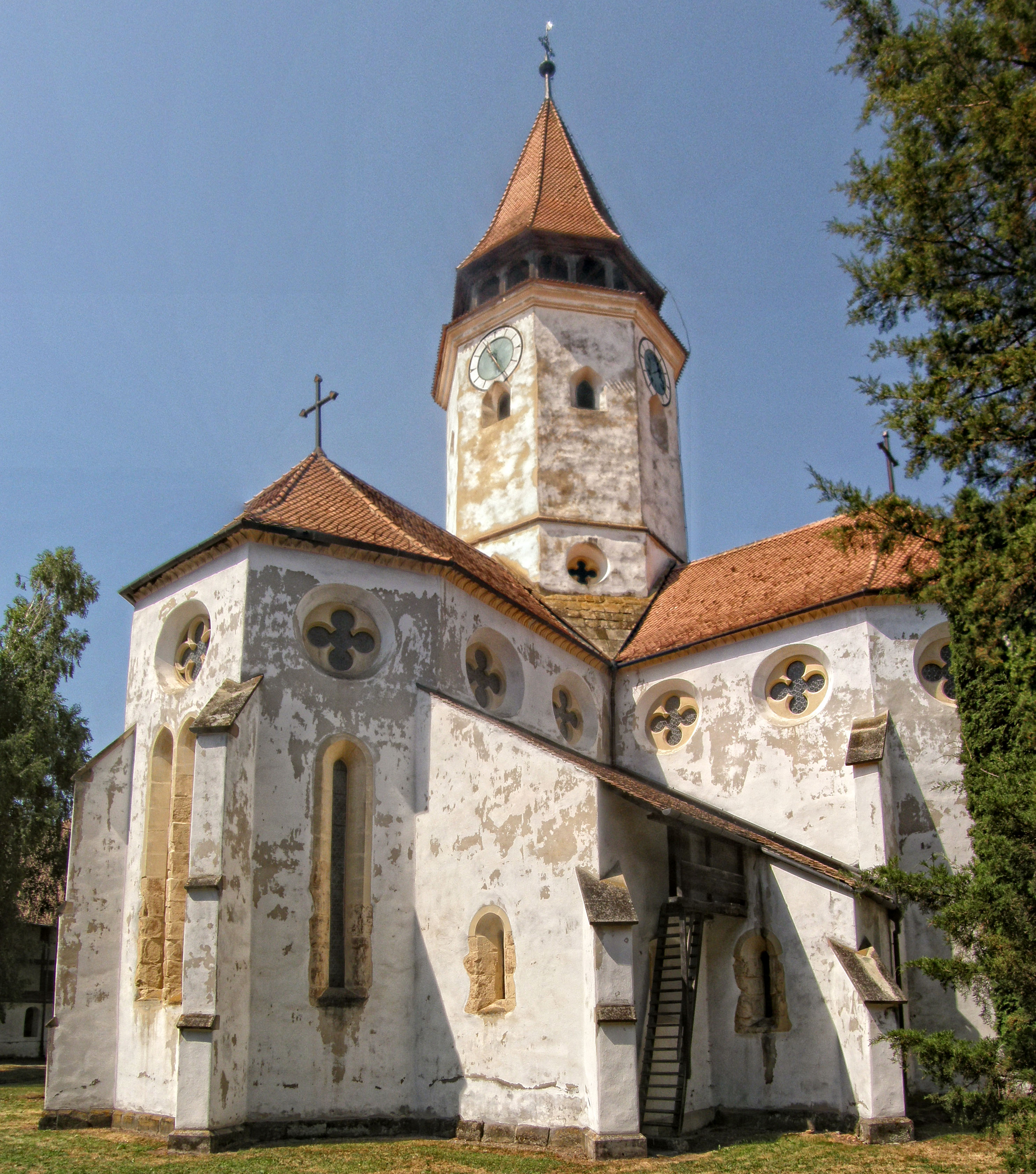
Church

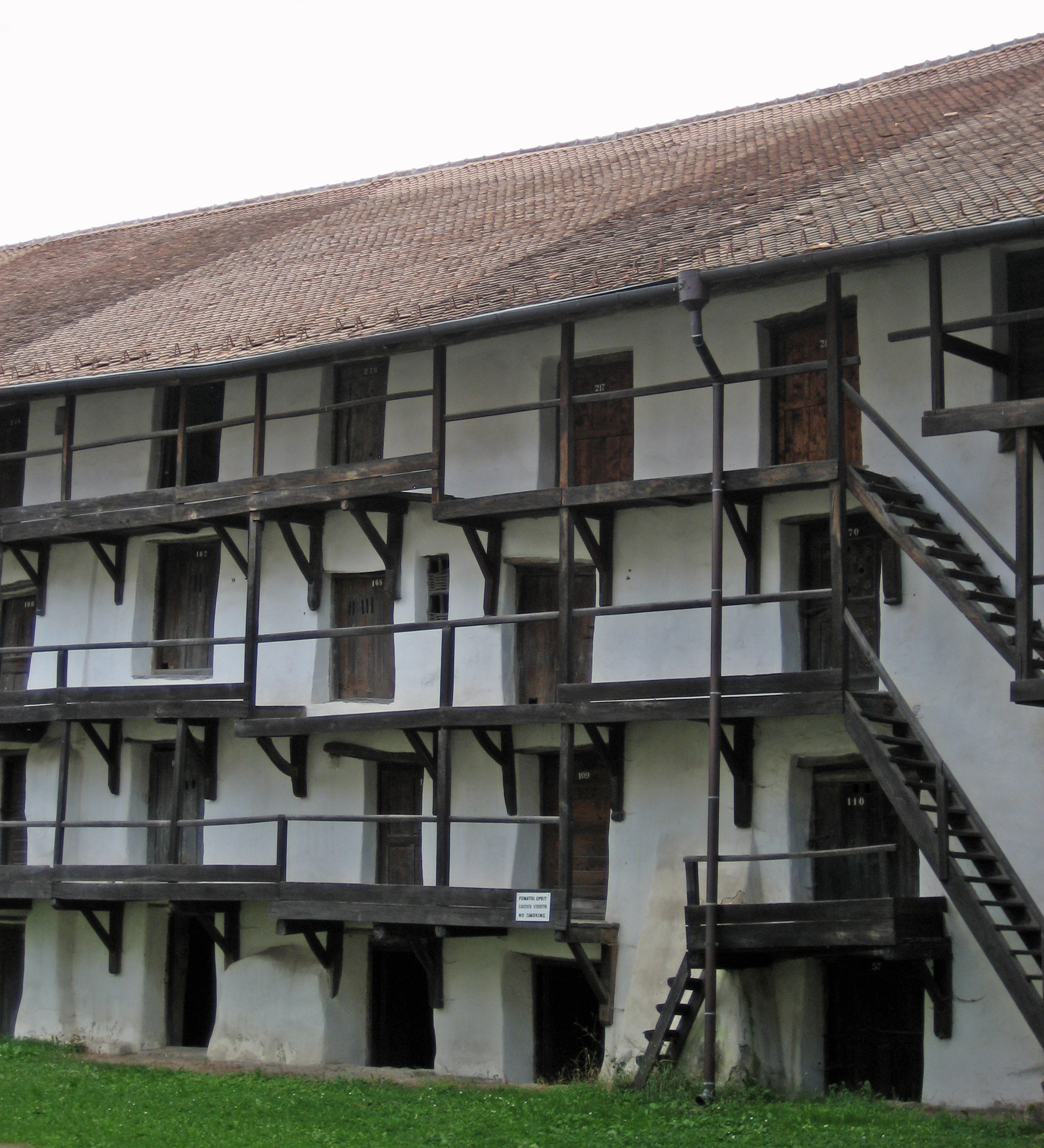
Wall rooms

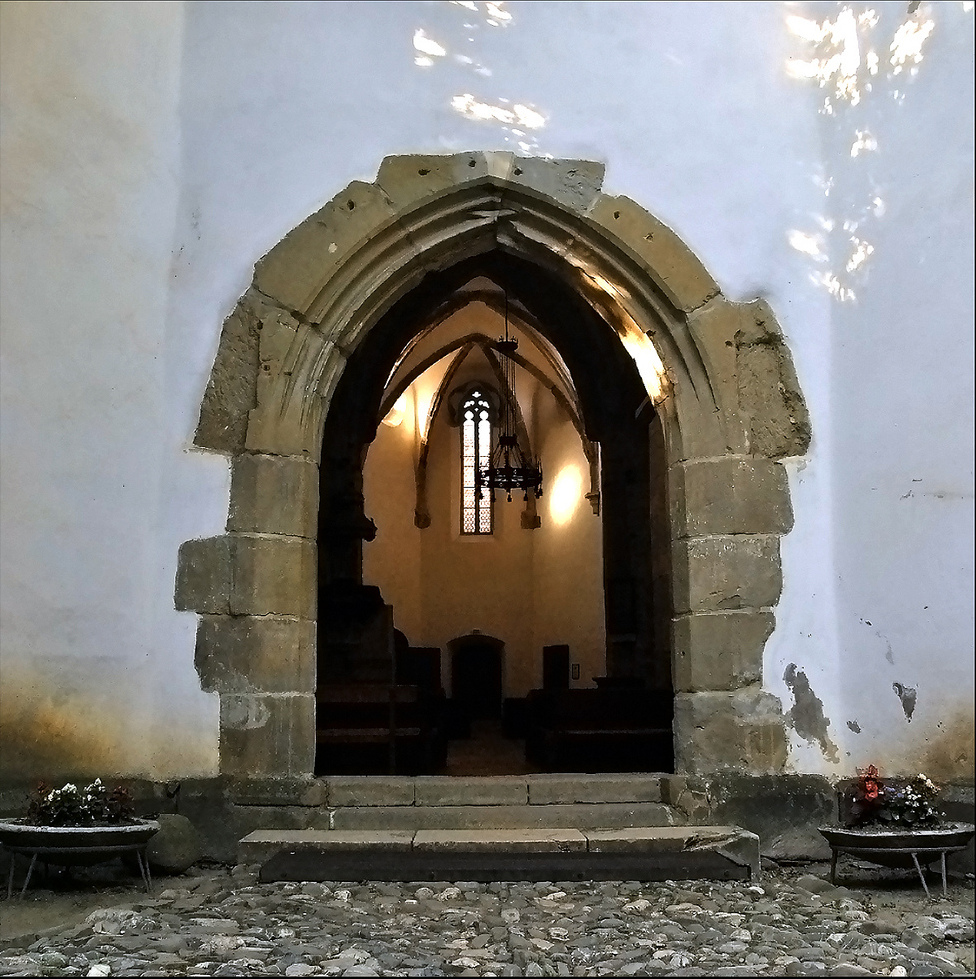
Church entrance

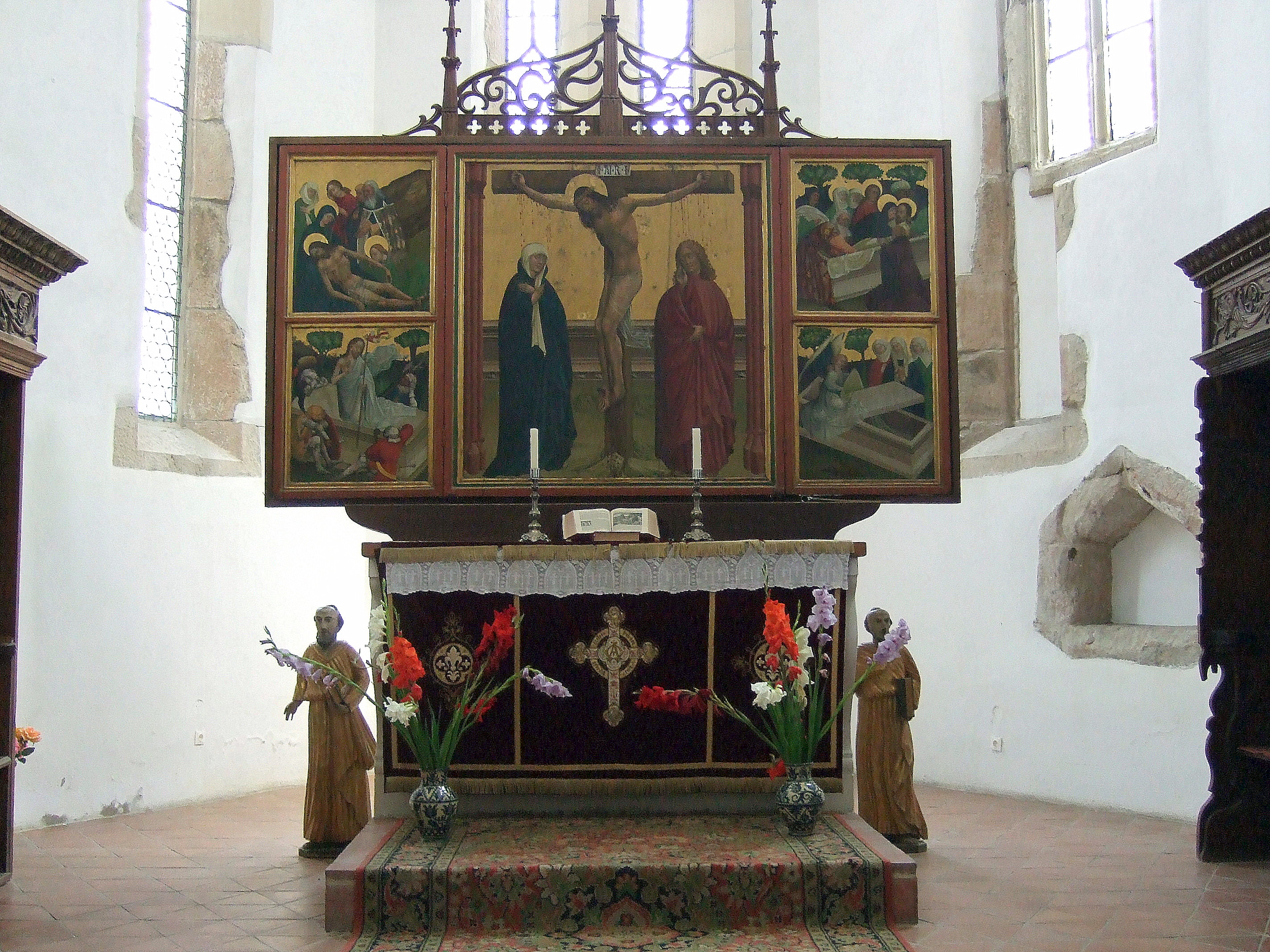
Altar

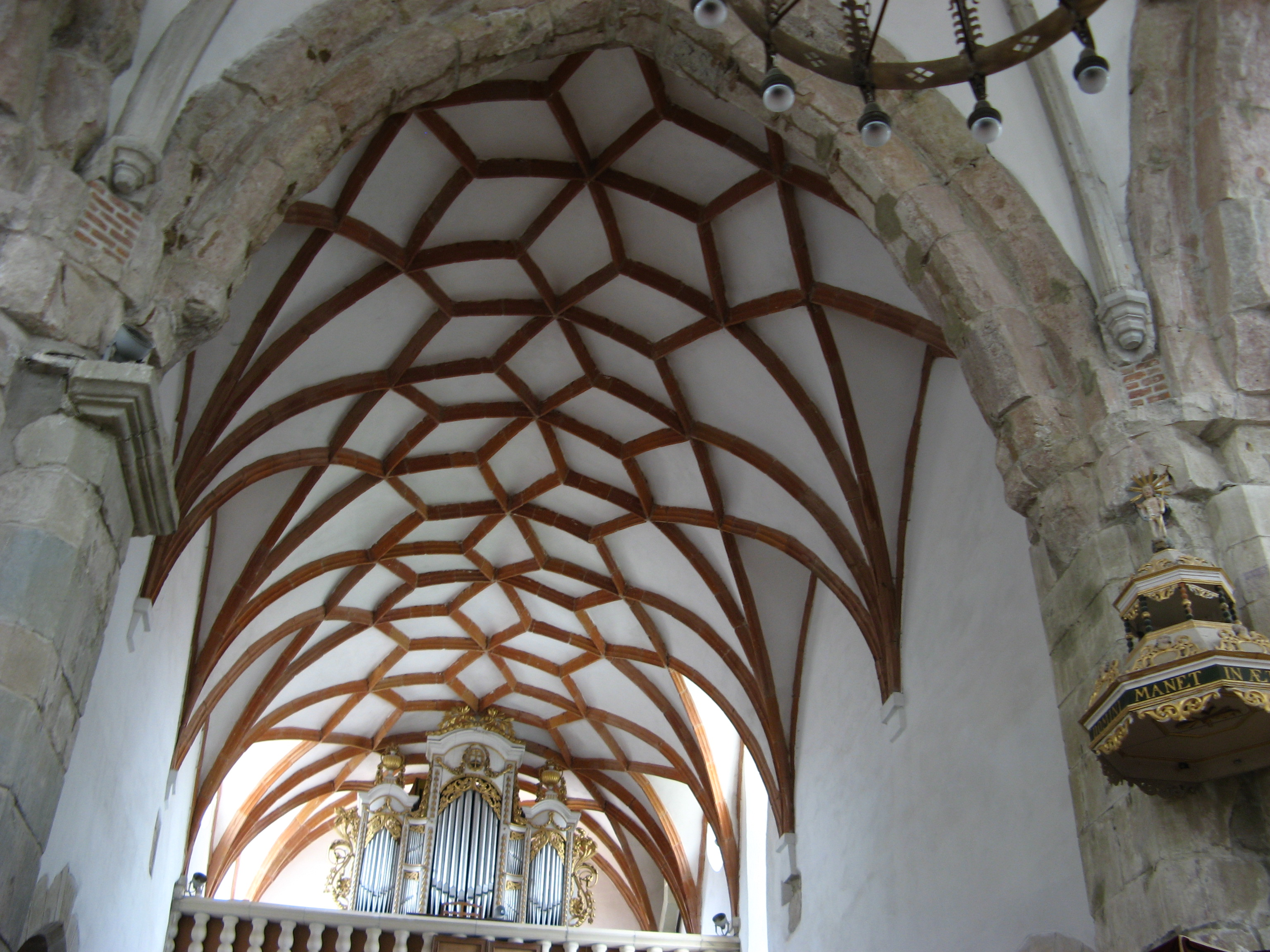
Ceiling and organ

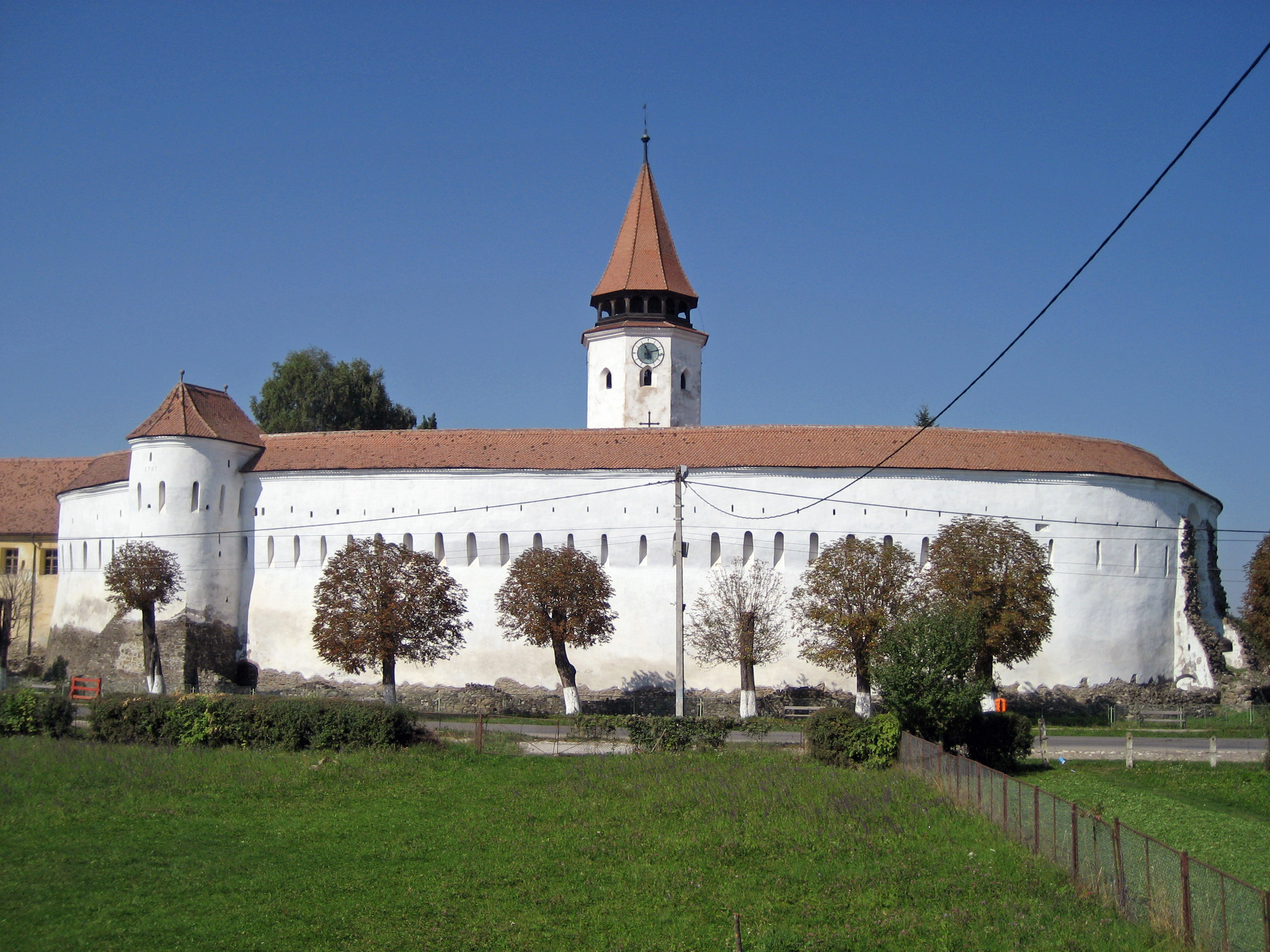
Outer wall

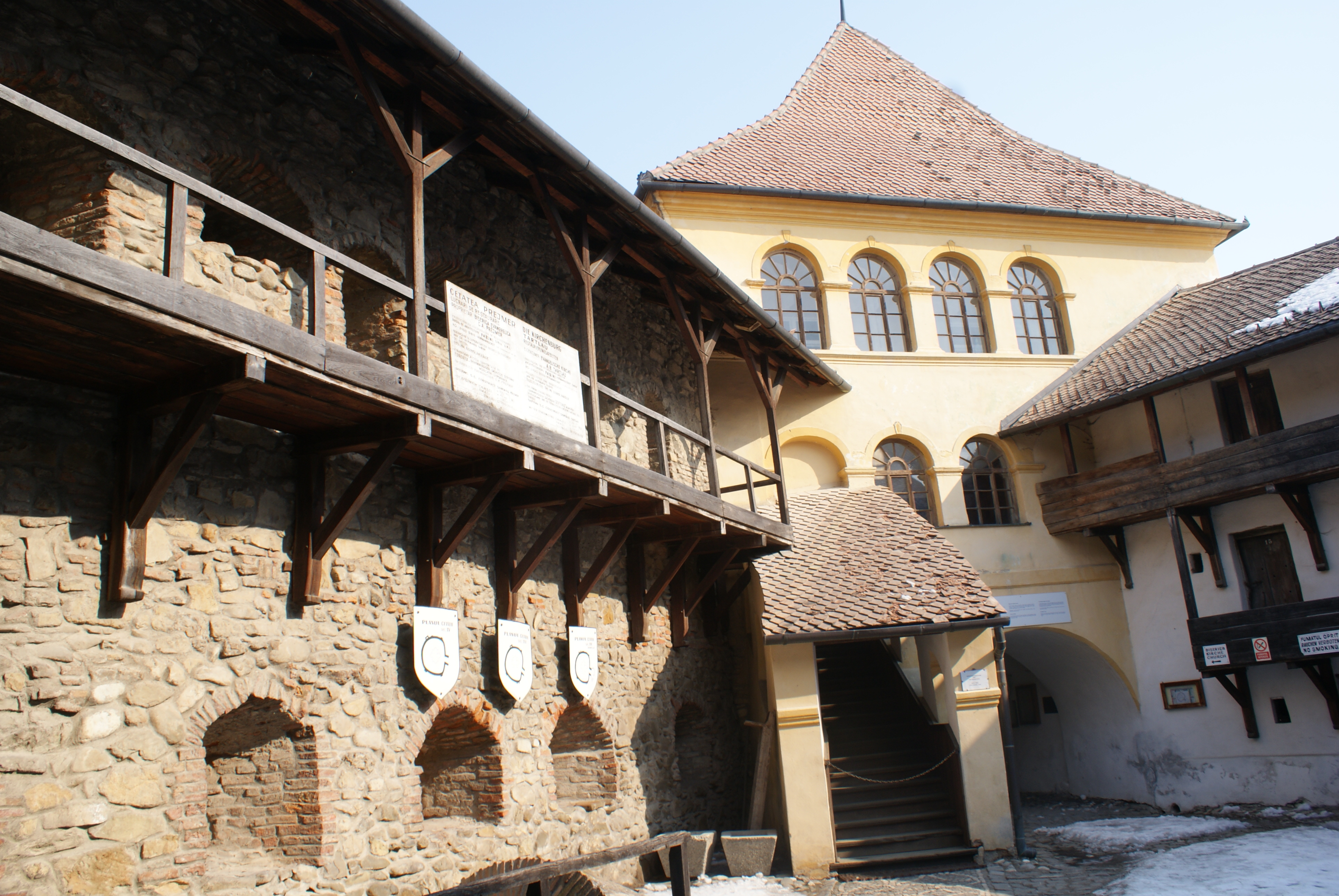
Battlement

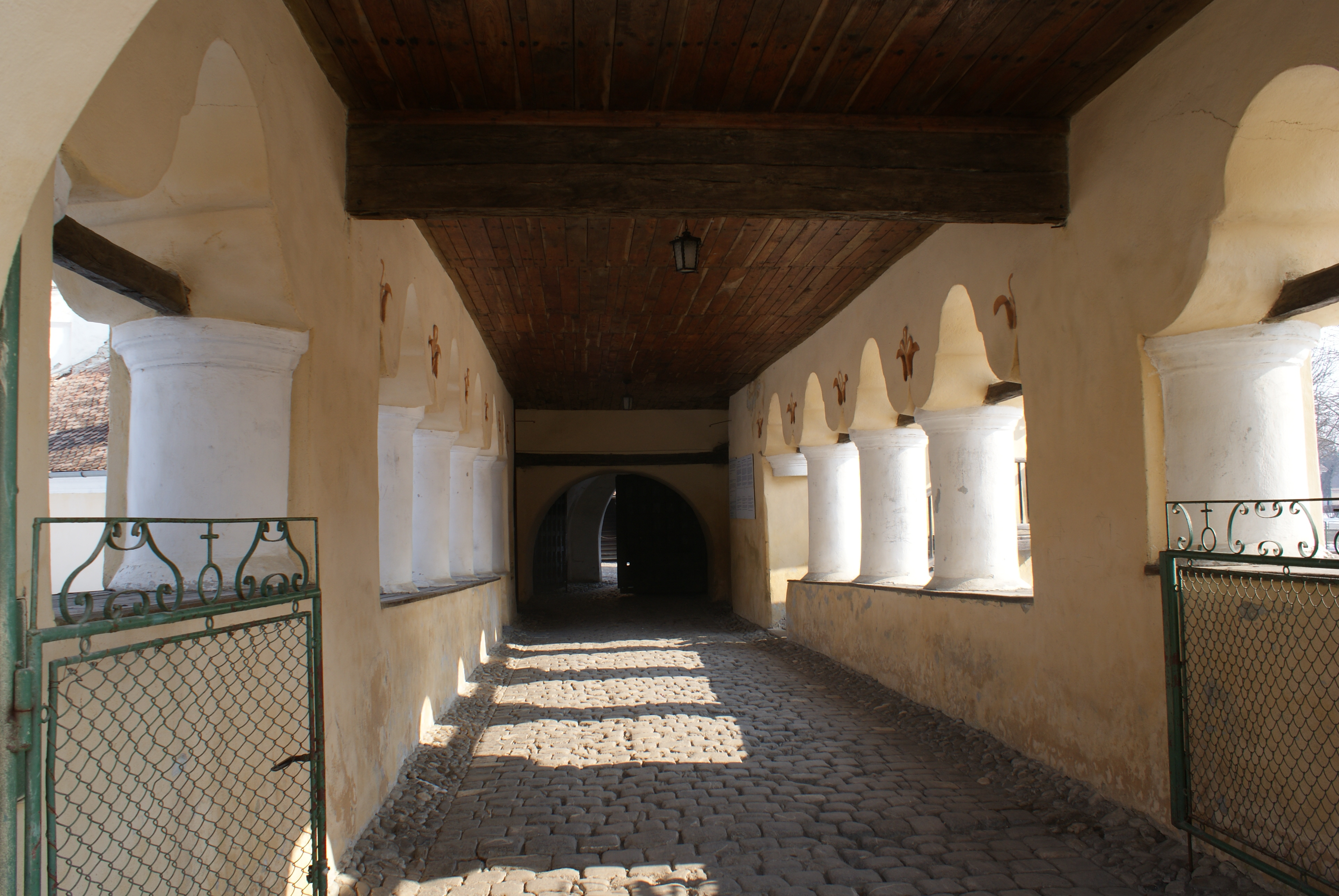
Arched gallery

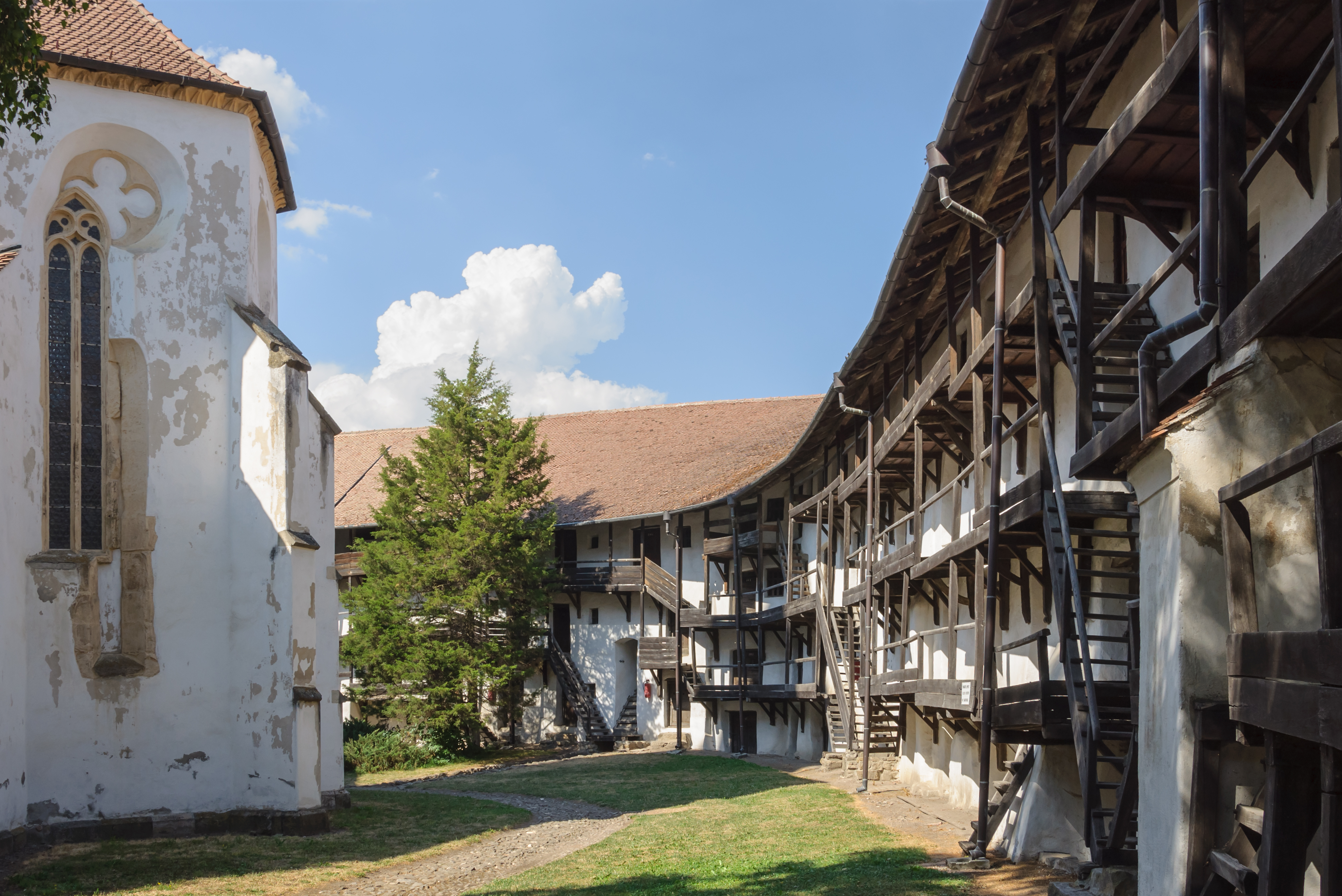
Inner courtyard

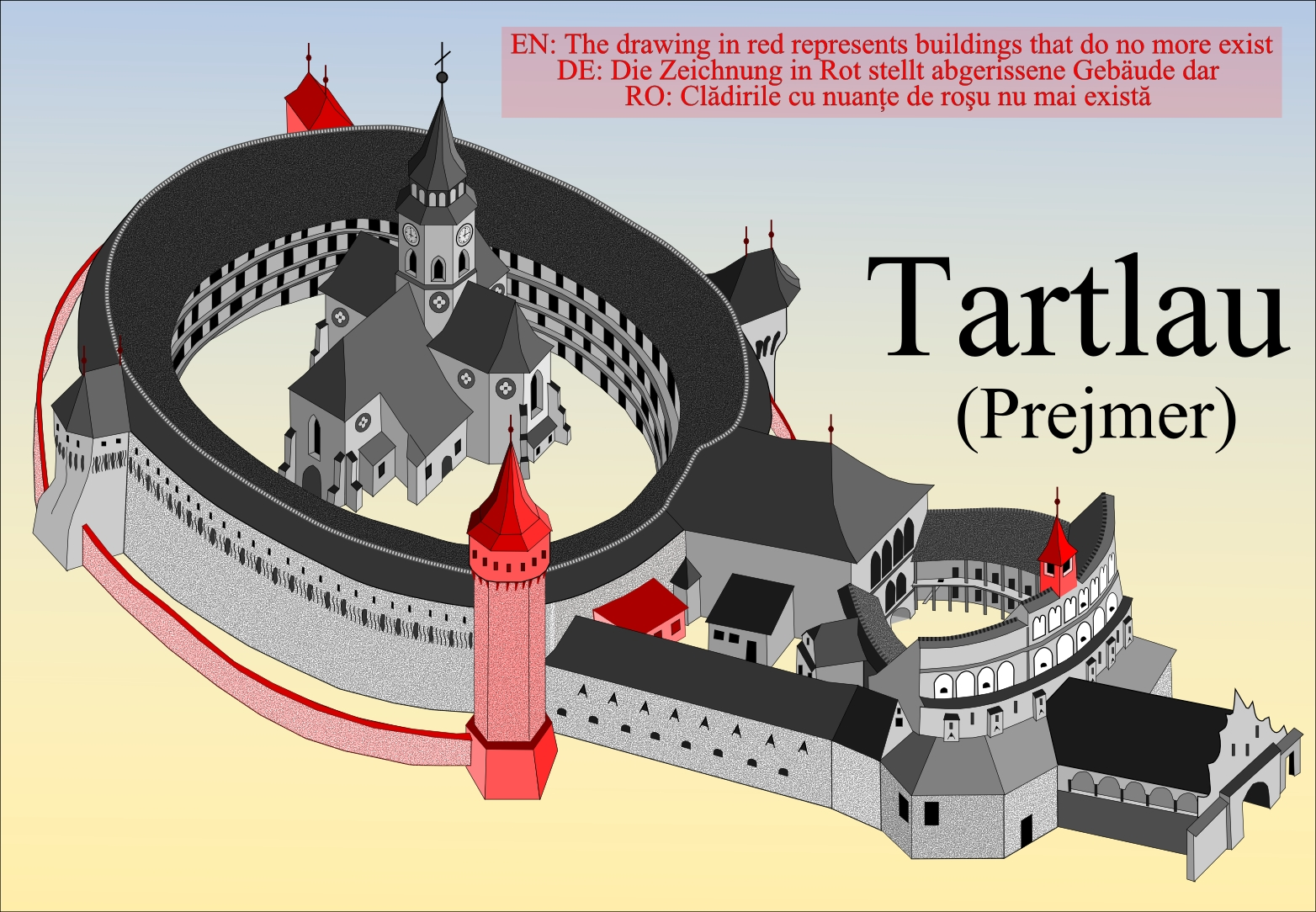
Plan
