= Siriu =

- Commune
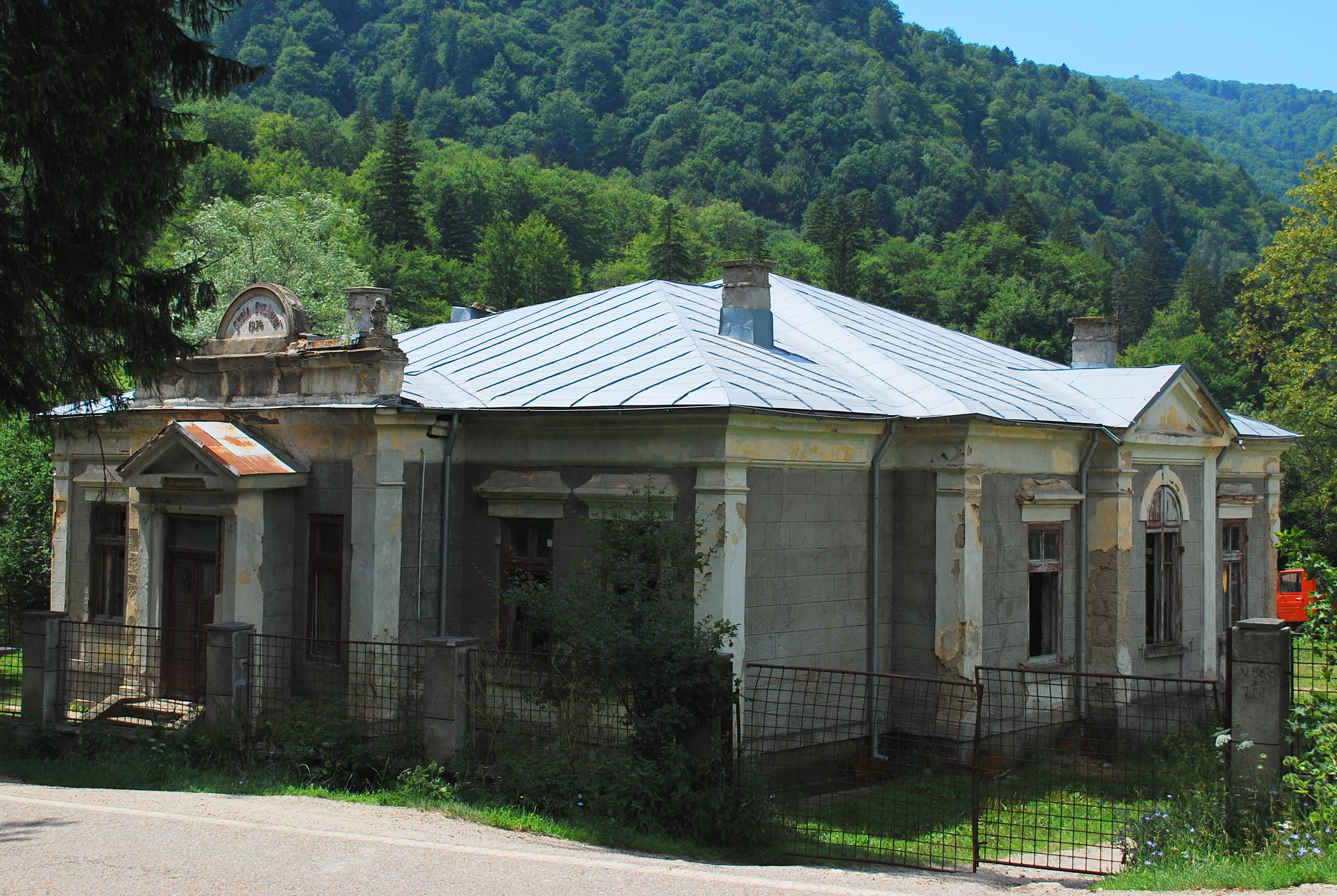
- The Cheia Buzăului House; before World War I, this was the place where the border custom house was located

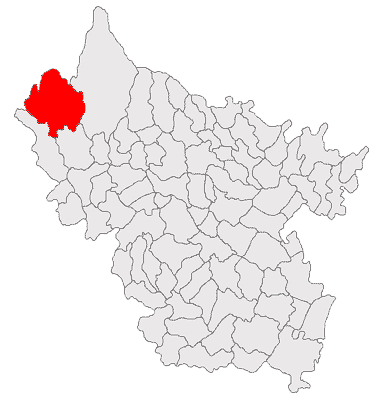
- Location in Buzău County

- Location in Romania
- Coordinates: 45°28′N 26°14′E
- Country: Romania
- County: Buzău
- Subdivisions: Cașoca, Colțu Pietrei, Gura Siriului, Lunca Jariștei, Muscelușa

Government
  - Mayor (2020–2024): Constantin-Dragoș Voicu (PSD)
- Area: 223.51 km^{2} (86.30 sq mi)
- Elevation: 490 m (1,610 ft)
- Highest elevation: 1,400 m (4,600 ft)
- Population (2021-12-01): 3,063
  - Density: 13.70/km^{2} (35.49/sq mi)
- Time zone: UTC+02:00 (EET)
  - Summer (DST): UTC+03:00 (EEST)
- Postal code: 127580
- Area code: +(40) 238
- Vehicle reg.: BZ
- Website: comunasiriu.ro

Siriu is a commune in Buzău County, Muntenia, Romania, in the valley of the river Buzău. It is composed of five villages: Cașoca, Colțu Pietrii, Gura Siriului, Lunca Jariștei (the commune centre), and Mușcelușa.

== Geography ==
=== Location ===
Siriu is located in the north-western part of the county, in the Buzău Mountains, at the Carpathians' curvature, on both sides of the river Buzău. The maximum altitude of the Siriu commune exceeds 1,400 m (4,600 ft). The commune is crossed by national road DN10, which starts in the county capital, Buzău, goes over the Buzău Pass, and ends in Brașov.

The Siriu Dam, constructed between 1982 and 1994 and its artificial lake are located in the commune. Lacul Vulturilor is a periglacial lake also located in Siriu.

=== Flora and fauna ===
In 1972, 10 chamois were brought to Siriu and released in the wilderness of the mountain ranges. As of 2007, their number has risen to around 60. One of the largest firs in Romania, measuring 62 meters in height and 2.5 meters in diameter, grows in a forest in Siriu. A protected plant, Drosera rotundifolia, can also be found in the Siriu forests.

== History ==
The oldest attestation of Siriu dates back to the mid-sixteenth century. A document issued by the voivod of Wallachia granted ownership of some land in Siriu to Petru and Lupu.

== Economy ==
Many of the locals work at the Nehoiaşu hydroelectric power plant. Another branch of industry active in Siriu is wood processing. Other locals grow animals (mostly sheep or bovine), and fruit trees.

Historical population
Year	Pop.	±%
2002	3,246	—
2011	3,211	−1.1%
2021	3,063	−4.6%
Source: Census data
