= Lacul Vulturilor =

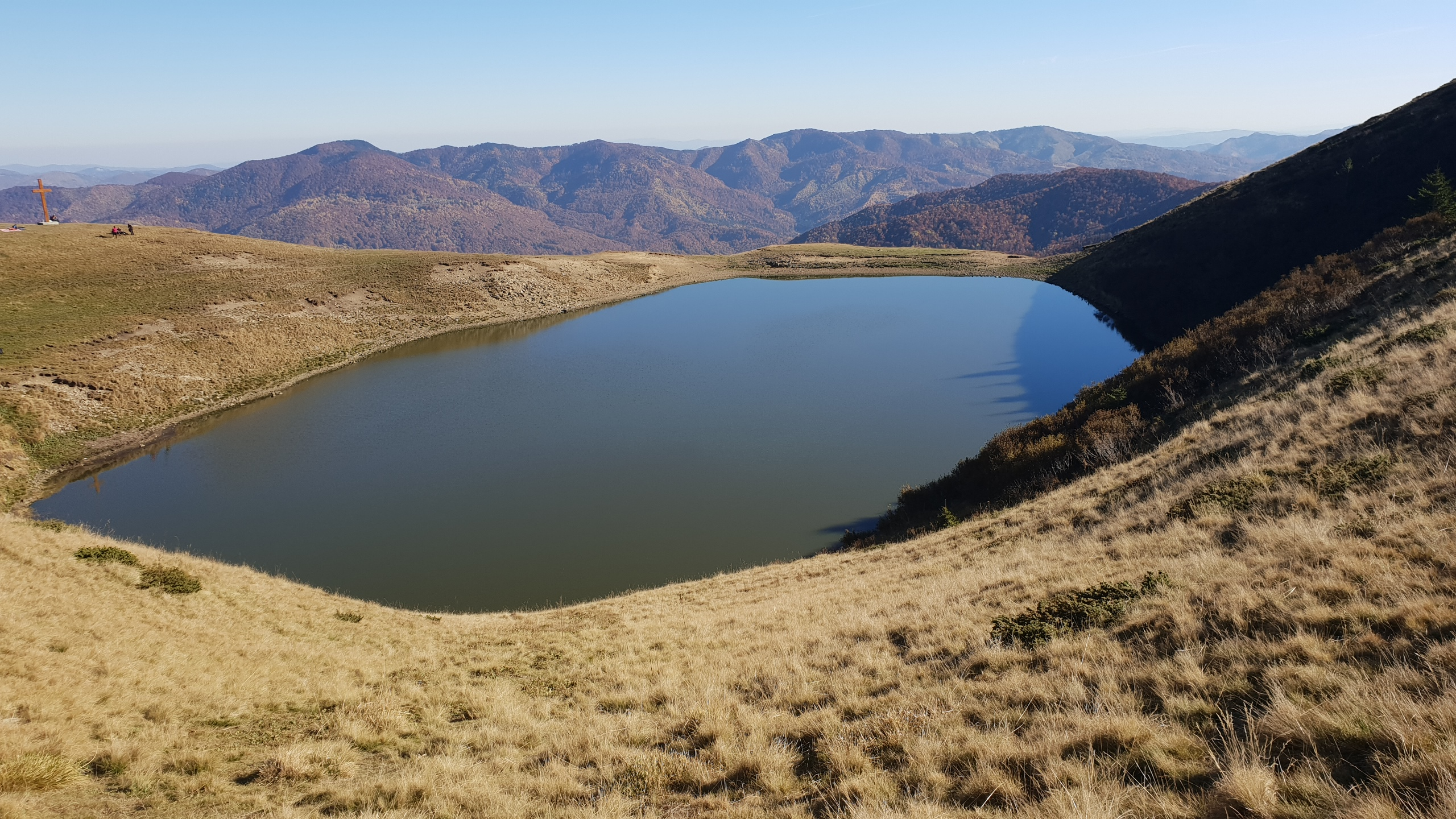
- October 2018

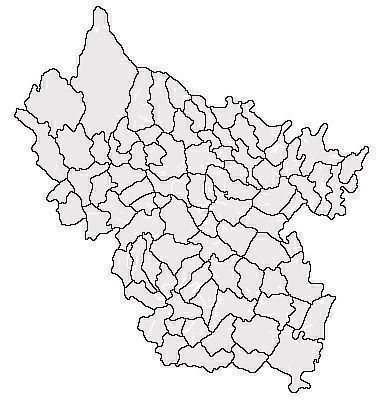
- Location within Buzău County
- Location: Romania
- Coordinates: 45°30′31″N 26°8′8″E
- Type: periglacial lake
- Basin countries: Romania
- Surface area: 0.9 ha (2.2 acres)
- Max. depth: 2.5 m (8 ft 2 in)
- Surface elevation: 1,420 m (4,660 ft)
- Settlements: Siriu

Lacul Vulturilor (Romanian for Eagles' Lake, also known as Lacul Fără Fund, The Bottomless Lake) is a periglacial lake located in the Buzău Mountains, at the Carpathian Mountains south-eastern curvature, at an altitude of 1420 m. The nearest town is Siriu.

== Name ==
Its name derives from a legend noted by Alexandru Vlahuţă in his work România pitorească. The legend tells that in spring, eagles come to the lake to teach their chicks how to fly and that by drinking the water, the eagles grew younger.

The lake is also known as the Bottomless Lake, although its depth does not exceed 2.5 meters.
