= Prejmer =

- Commune
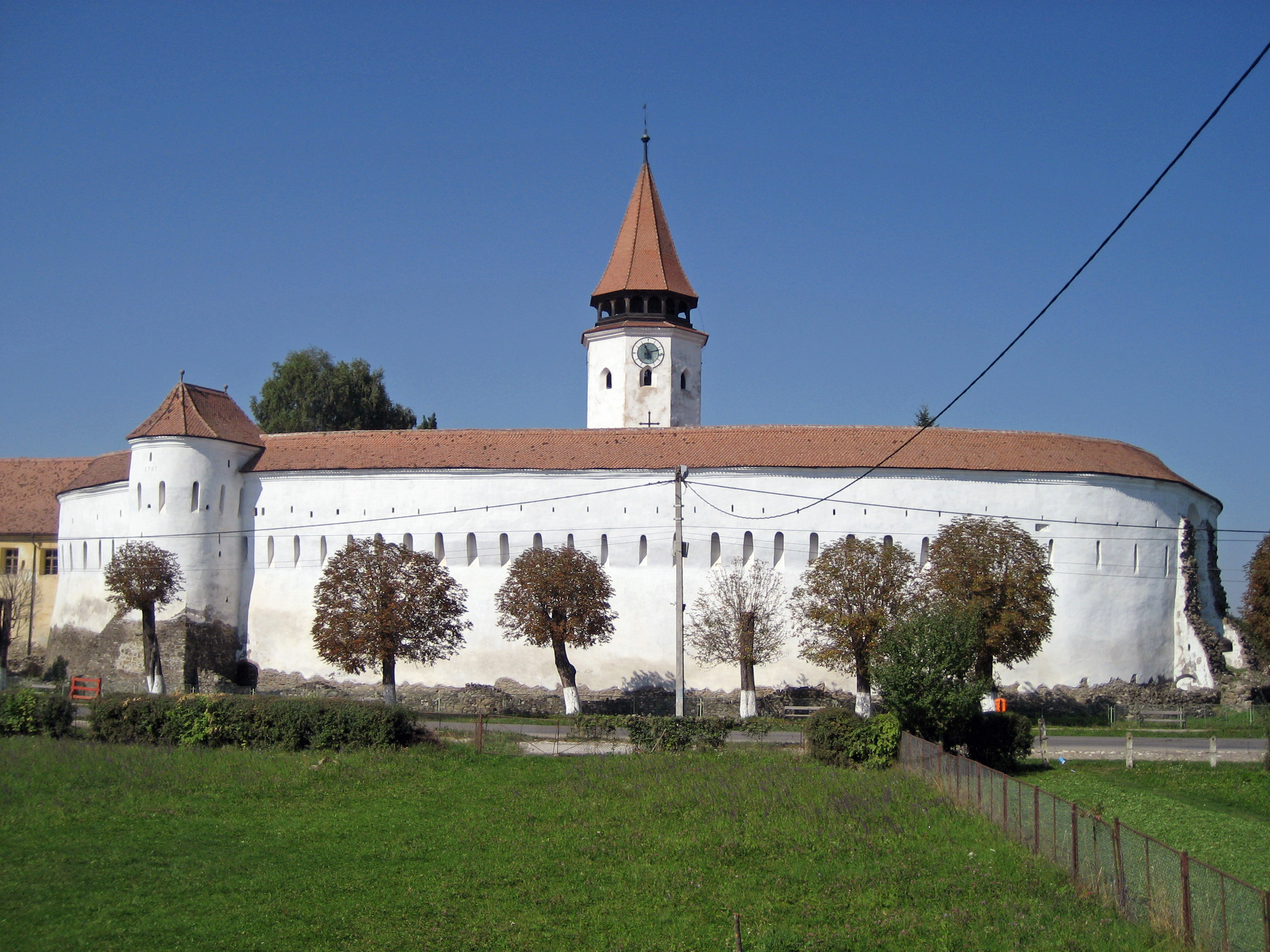
- Prejmer fortified church

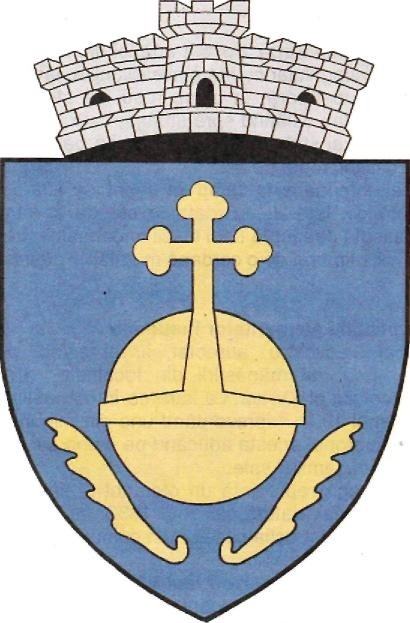
- Coat of arms

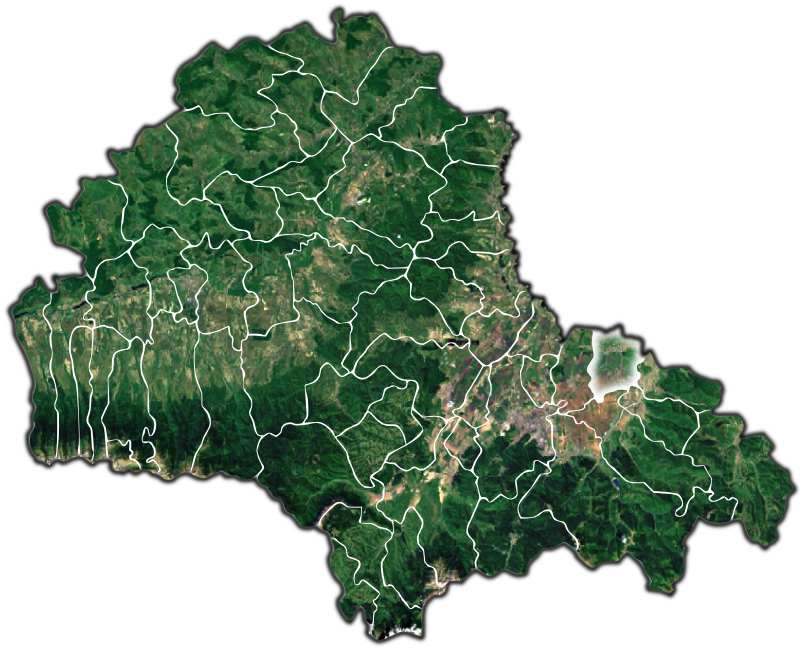
- Location within the county

- Location in Romania
- Coordinates: 45°43′N 25°46′E
- Country: Romania
- County: Brașov

Government
  - Mayor (2020–2024): Mihai-Florin Apafi (PNL)
- Area: 60.48 km^{2} (23.35 sq mi)
- Highest elevation: 593 m (1,946 ft)
- Lowest elevation: 561 m (1,841 ft)
- Population (2021-12-01): 8,647
  - Density: 143.0/km^{2} (370.3/sq mi)
- Time zone: UTC+02:00 (EET)
  - Summer (DST): UTC+03:00 (EEST)
- Postal code: 507165
- Area code: (+40) 02 68
- Vehicle reg.: BV
- Website: primariaprejmer.ro

Prejmer (German: Tartlau; Hungarian: Prázsmár) is a commune in Brașov County, Transylvania, Romania. It is composed of three villages: Lunca Câlnicului (Farkasvágó), Prejmer, and Stupinii Prejmerului (Rohrau; Méheskert). Located 18 km (11 mi) northeast of Brașov, the Olt River passes through the commune.

== History ==
The Teutonic Knights constructed the fortress Tartlau in 1212–1213 as part of their colonization of the Burzenland region. The town of Prejmer near the castle had begun development by 1225, and was the easternmost settlement of the Transylvanian Saxons. Prejmer was repeatedly invaded throughout the Middle Ages by various groups, including the Mongols, Tatars, Hungarians, Ottoman Turks, Cossacks, and Moldavians. However, the castle was only captured once, by Gabriel Báthory in 1611. Most of Prejmer's German population fled the commune after the Romanian Revolution of 1989.

Prejmer is noted for its fortified church, one of the best preserved of its kind in Eastern Europe. Between 1962–1970, the Romanian government carefully restored it to its present condition; the restoration work was done under the direction of architect Mariana Angelescu and engineer Alexandru Dobriceanu. The church is modeled after churches of Jerusalem, as well as built in the style of Late Gothic churches from the Rhineland. In the 15th century, it was surrounded by a wall 12m high, forming a quadrilateral with rounded corners. The wall was reinforced by four horseshoe-shaped towers, two of which have since disappeared. The entrance—a vaulted gallery—is protected by a barbican and flanked by a lateral wall. The defensive structure is strengthened by embrasures and bretèches, while the covered way is surrounded by a parapet. The granaries and rooms that accommodated the villagers are arranged on four levels above the cellars.

== Demographics ==
Historical population
Year	Pop.	±%
1850	3,351	—
1900	3,580	+6.8%
1941	5,600	+56.4%
1977	9,276	+65.6%
1992	8,299	−10.5%
2002	8,316	+0.2%
2011	8,472	+1.9%
2021	8,647	+2.1%
Source: Census data

At the 2011 census, the commune had 8,472 inhabitants, of which 90.7% were Romanians, 6.3% Roma, 1.9% Hungarians, and 0.8% Germans. At the 2021 census, Prejmer had a population of 8,647; of those, 81,23% were Romanians, 8.6% Roma, and 1.28% Hungarians.

== Natives ==
- Darie Magheru (1923–1983), Romanian poet and theatre actor
- Leonard Oprea (b. 1953), Romanian writer

== Gallery ==
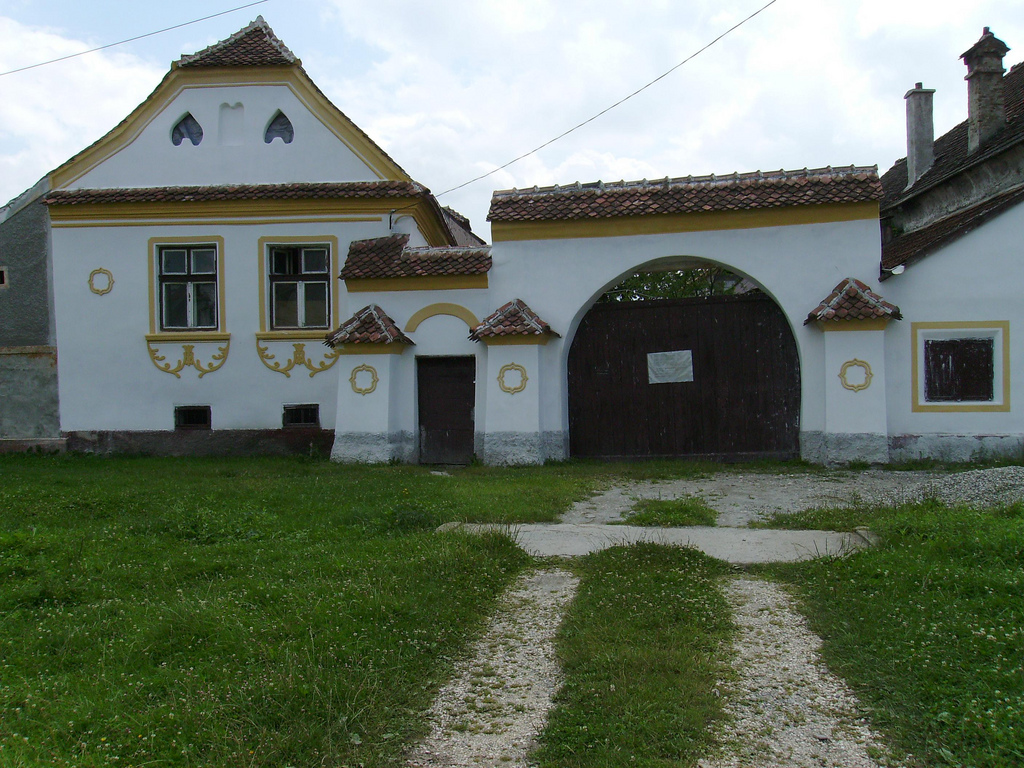
Typical house in Prejmer

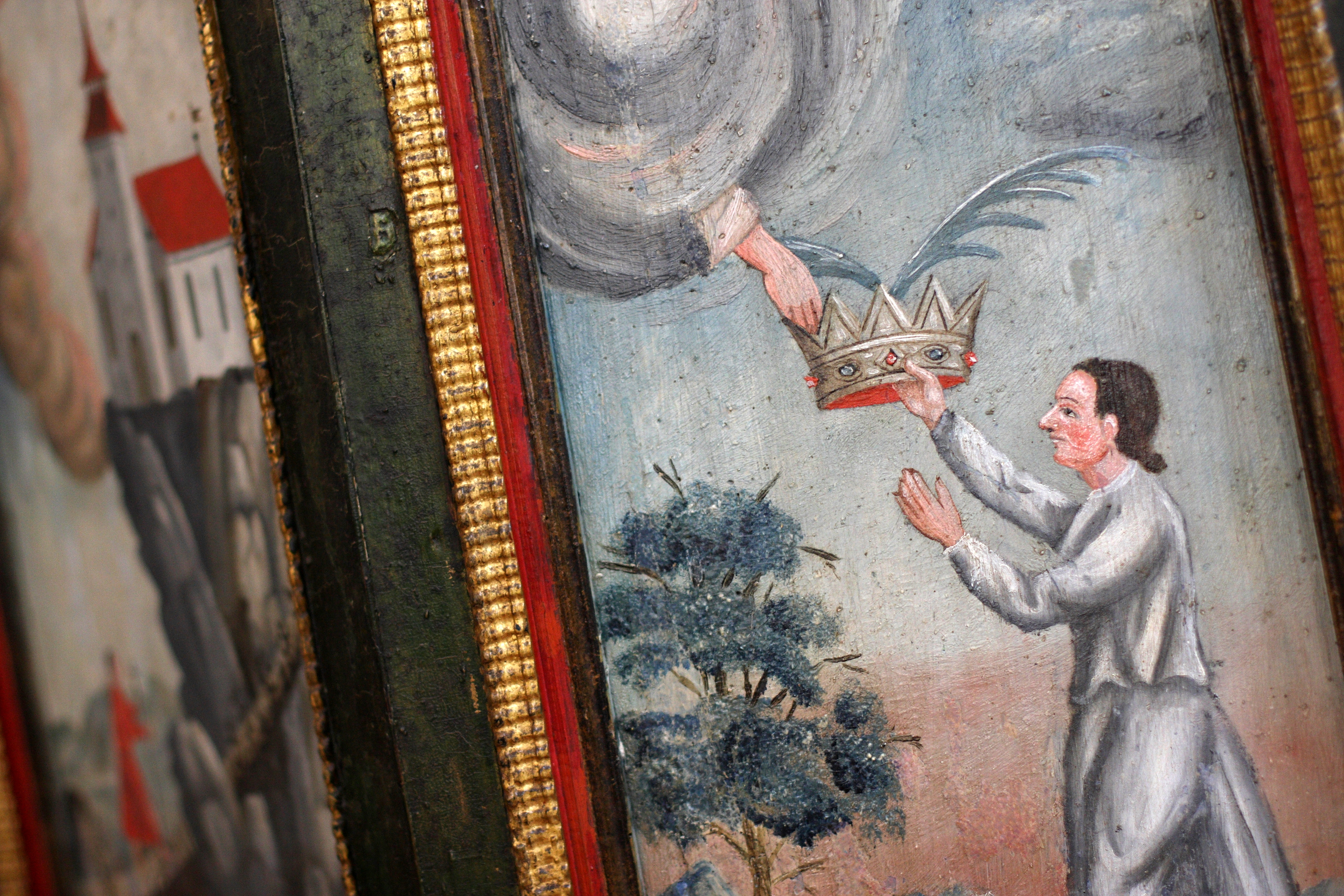
Painting on the walls of Prejmer Citadel

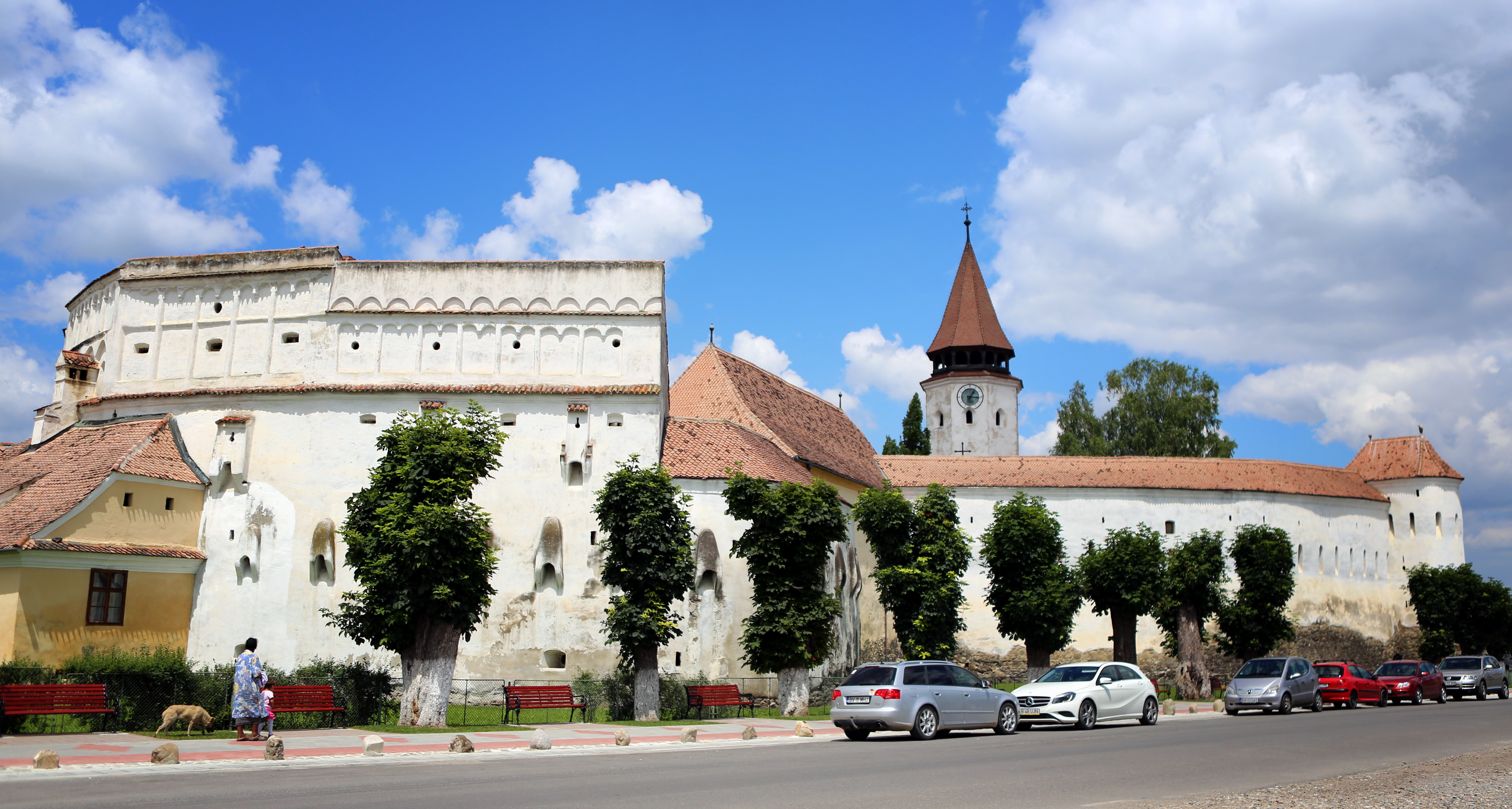
Fortified church

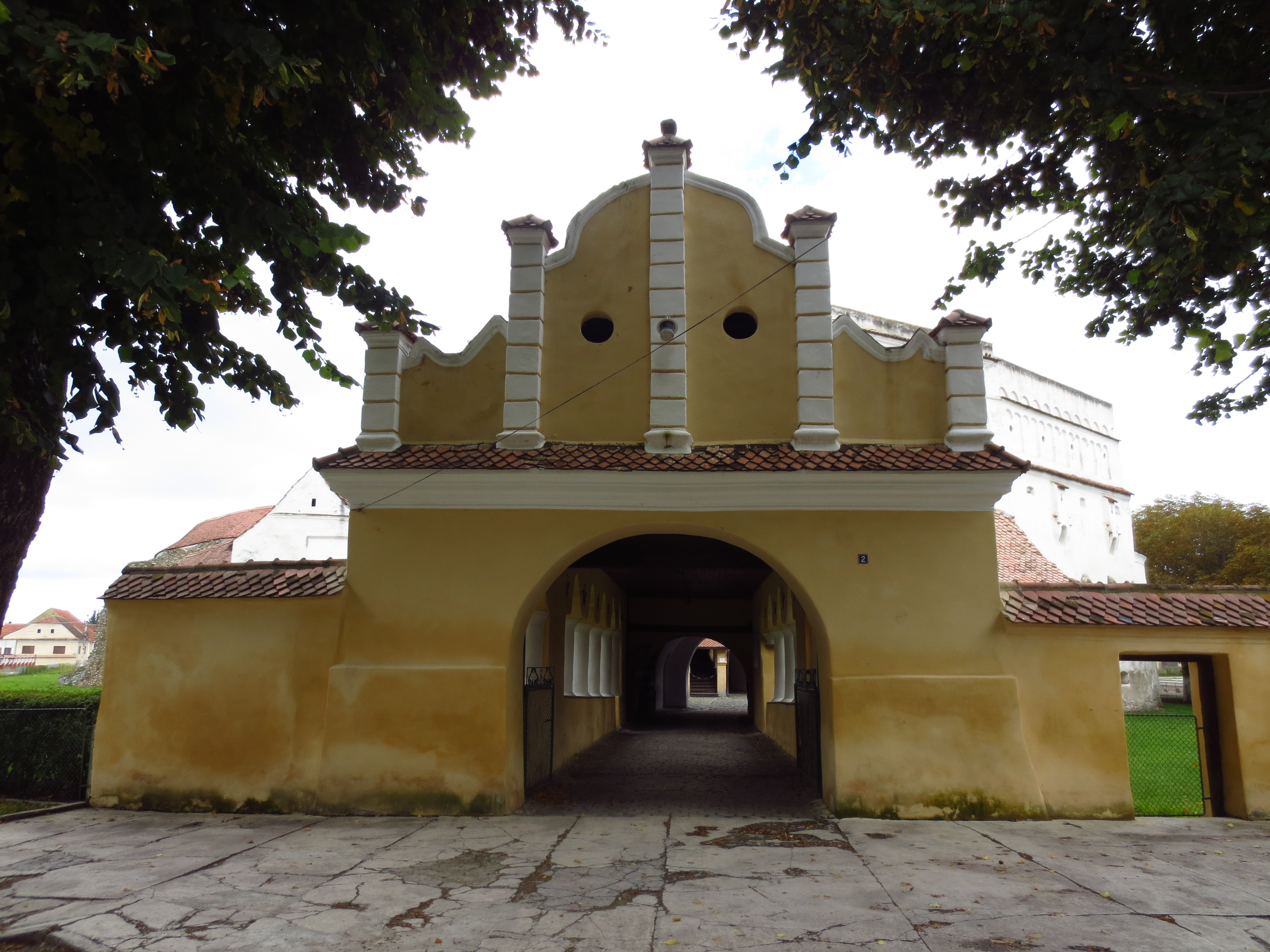
Entrance to the fortified church

== See also ==
- List of castles in Romania
- Tourism in Romania
- Villages with fortified churches in Transylvania
