= Lake Siriu =

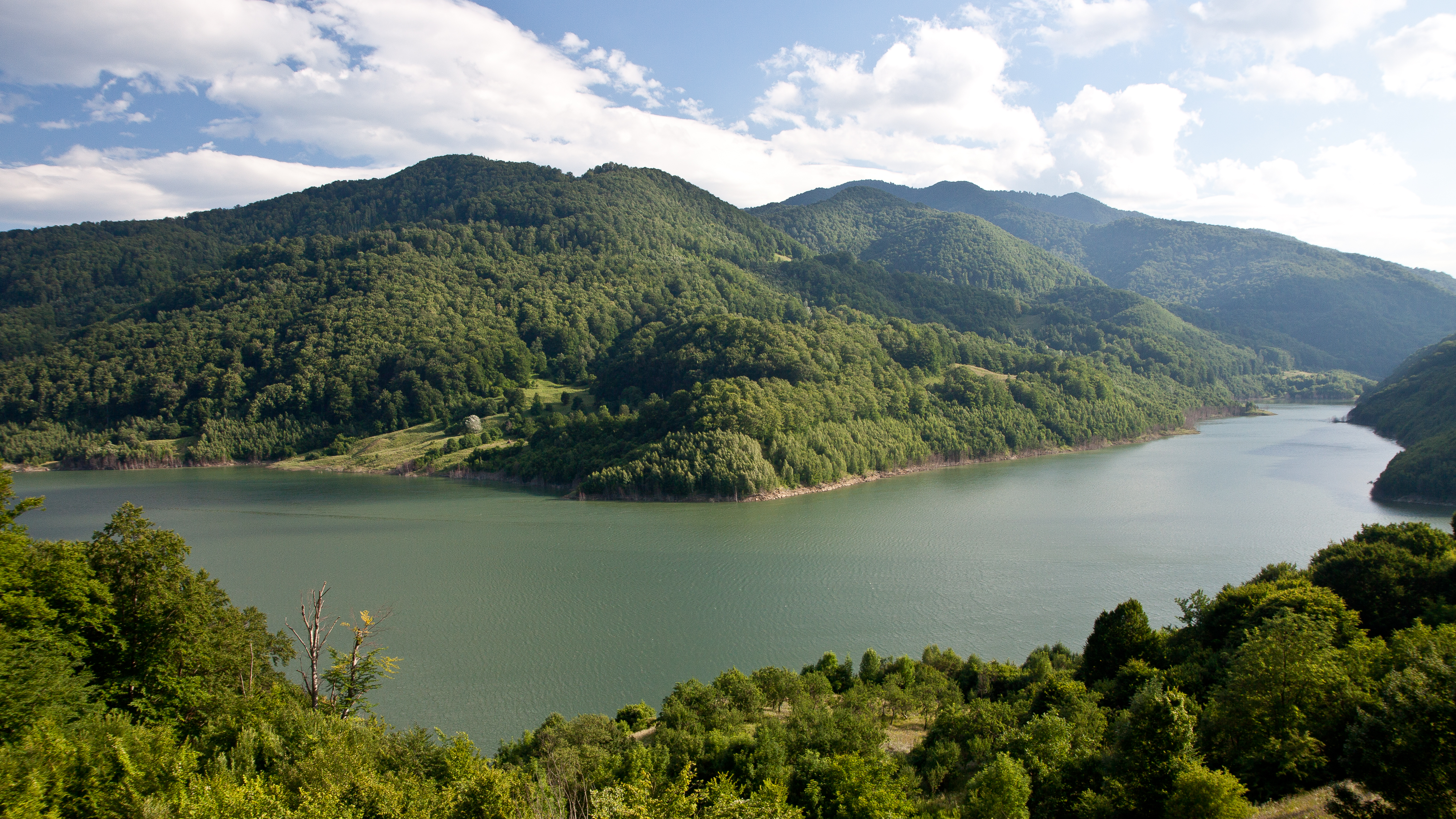
- Lake Siriu

- Location within Romania
- Location: Romania
- Coordinates: 45°30′N 26°15′E
- Type: artificial lake
- Primary inflows: Buzău River
- Primary outflows: Buzău River
- Basin countries: Romania
- Max. length: 11.5 km (7.1 mi)
- Surface area: 420 ha (1,000 acres)
- Max. depth: 120 m (390 ft) (dam height)
- Water volume: 155 hm^{3} (126,000 acre⋅ft) (max)
- Settlements: Siriu

Lake Siriu is an artificial dam lake in Romania, on the Buzău River valley. Construction of the dam started in 1982, and the 42 MW Nehoiașu hydroelectric plant was opened in 1994.

The dam is a 122 metres (400 ft) high embankment dam with a clay core, the second largest embankment dam in Romania.
