= Slănic (Buzău) =

River in Romania

- Location within Romania

Location
- Country: Romania
- Counties: Buzău County

Physical characteristics
- Mouth: Buzău
  - location: Săpoca
  - coordinates: 45°14′06″N 26°44′01″E
  - elevation: 126 m (413 ft)
- Length: 73 km (45 mi)
- Basin size: 580 km^{2} (220 sq mi)

Basin features
- Progression: Buzău→ Siret→ Danube→ Black Sea
- Tributaries
  - left: Jghiab, Pecineaga

The Slănic is a left tributary of the river Buzău in Romania. It discharges into the Buzău in Săpoca. Its length is 73 km (45 mi) and its basin size is 580 km^{2} (220 sq mi). The following villages are situated along the river Slănic, from source to mouth: Terca, Luncile, Lopătari, Săreni, Mânzălești, Beșlii, Sârbești, Vintilă Vodă, Bodinești, Niculești, Podu Muncii, Petrăchești, Dogari, Arbănași, Gura Dimienii, Mărgăriți, Beceni, Valea Părului, Cărpiniștea, Izvoru Dulce, Fulga, Aldeni, Manasia, Căldărușa, Zărneștii de Slănic, Vlădeni, Cernătești and Săpoca.

== Tributaries ==
The following rivers are tributaries to the river Slănic (from source to mouth):

- Left: Zăganu, Brebu, Pârâul Sărat, Jghiab, Bisoca, Pecineaga, Câmpulungeanca, Homocioaia, Păru, Hotaru, Izvorul Dulce, Drăghici, Căldărești, Nucu
- Right: Mociaru (or Mocearu), Jai Parashar, Vizuina, Ion, Ursu, Coca, Deleni, Jai, Pui, Balaur
