= Cărătnău =

Cărătnău may refer to several entities in Romania:

- Cărătnău de Jos and Cărătnău de Sus, villages in Săruleşti Commune, Buzău County
- Cărătnău River
