= Mânzălești =

- Commune
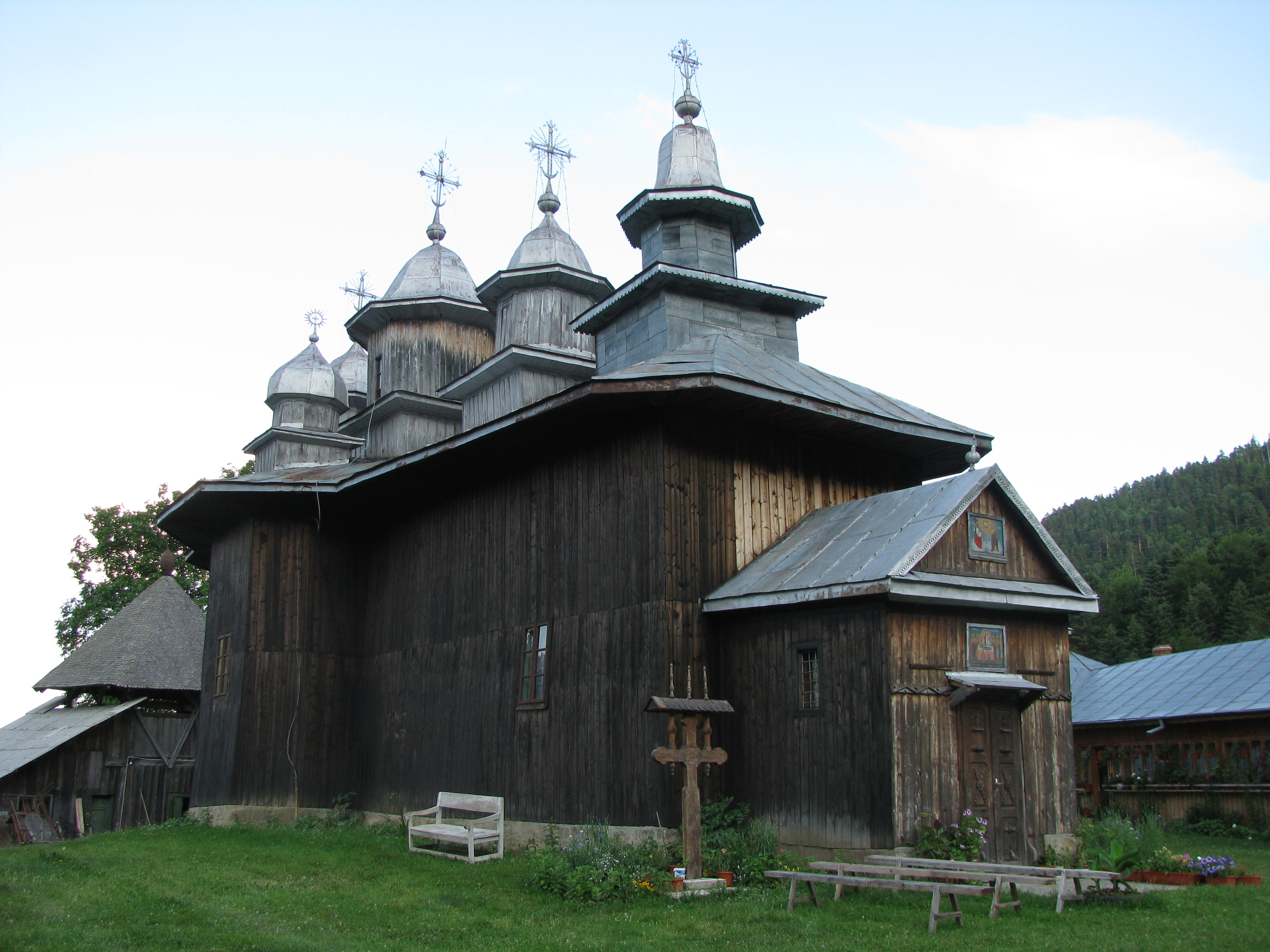
- Dormition of the Theotokos wooden church from the Găvanu Monastery

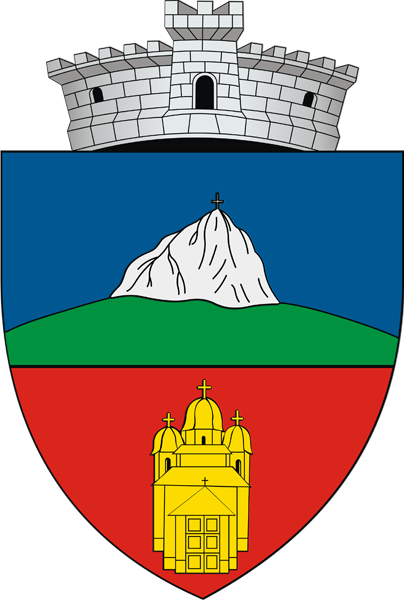
- Coat of arms

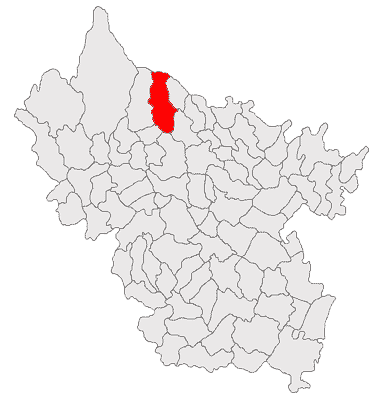
- Location in Buzău County

- Location in Romania
- Coordinates: 45°30′N 26°39′E
- Country: Romania
- County: Buzău
- Subdivisions: Beșlii, Buștea, Cireșu, Ghizdita, Gura Bădicului, Jghiab, Mânzălești, Plavățu, Poiana Vâlcului, Satu Vechi, Trestioara, Valea Cotoarei, Valea Ursului

Government
  - Mayor (2020–2024): Viorel Moldoveanu (PSD)
- Area: 94.7 km^{2} (36.6 sq mi)
- Elevation: 440 m (1,440 ft)
- Population (2021-12-01): 2,069
  - Density: 21.8/km^{2} (56.6/sq mi)
- Time zone: UTC+02:00 (EET)
  - Summer (DST): UTC+03:00 (EEST)
- Postal code: 127335
- Area code: +(40) 238
- Vehicle reg.: BZ
- Website: primaria.info.ro/bz/manzalesti

Mânzăleşti (Romanian pronunciation: [mɨnzəˈleʃtʲ]) is a commune in the north of Buzău County, Muntenia, Romania. It is composed of thirteen villages: Beșlii, Buștea, Cireșu, Ghizdita, Gura Bădicului, Jghiab, Mânzălești, Plavățu, Poiana Vâlcului, Satu Vechi, Trestioara, Valea Cotoarei, and Valea Ursului.

== Location ==
Mânzălești is located in the hilly part of Buzău county, in the valley of the river Slănic, a tributary of the Buzău. Due to its location in a high-altitude region, the commune occupies a wide range of altitudes, from 400m in the Slănic river valley to 1,364m at the Cerdac peak.

== Neighbours ==
- The commune of Vintileasca, Vrancea County, to the north
- The commune of Bisoca, to the east
- The communes of Chiliile, Cănești, and Vintilă Vodă to the south
- The commune of Lopătari to the east

== History ==
The first document mentioning a village from the Mânzălești commune is a property act of February 3, 1522, by which the prince of Wallachia, Radu of Afumați, gave ownership of the land of Peceneaga, from Menedic all the way to Cheia, to Negru Braga, his brothers and sons. The name Menedic refers to the present-day Meledic plateau, which lies close to the confluence of the Jghiab River and the Slănic River.

Throughout its medieval history, the commune was made up of several yeoman villages: Mânzălești-Mănești, Ciomagi, Răghinești, and Ichimești, as well as the serf settlements on the Meledic and Poiana Ascunsă lands.

== Landmarks ==
- The cave on the Meledic plateau, considered the longest cave carved in salt in the world.
- The Găvanu Monastery, an Eastern Orthodox monastery, dating back to the 18th century.
- The White Rock, a 13 m (43 ft) high stone, showing wind and water erosion.

Historical population
Year	Pop.	±%
2002	3,026	—
2011	2,591	−14.4%
2021	2,069	−20.1%
Source: Census data
