= Pecineaga (river) =

Pecineaga Peceneaga
- Location within Romania

Location
- Country: Romania
- Counties: Buzău County

Physical characteristics
- Mouth: Slănic
  - location: Vintilă Vodă
  - coordinates: 45°27′28″N 26°44′44″E
  - elevation: 319 m (1,047 ft)
- Length: 14 km (8.7 mi)
- Basin size: 58 km^{2} (22 sq mi)

Basin features
- Progression: Slănic→ Buzău→ Siret→ Danube→ Black Sea

The Pecineaga or Peceneaga is a left tributary of the river Slănic in Romania. It discharges into the Slănic in Vintilă Vodă. Its length is 14 km (8.7 mi) and its basin size is 58 km^{2} (22 sq mi). The following villages are situated along the river Pecineaga, from source to mouth: Băltăgari, Sările, Sărulești, Cărătnău de Jos and Vintilă Vodă.
