= History of Buzău =

According to Romanian archaeologist Vasile Pârvan, the river Mousaios (Μουσαίος) mentioned in a letter from Ioannis Soranus, governor of Scythia Minor, to the archbishop of Caesarea Mazaca (c. 400 AD) should be identified with the modern Buzău River. The document, kept in copies at the Vatican Library and San Marco Library in Venice, tells about the martyrdom of a Christian missionary by the name of Sabbas, drowned by the Goths in the river Mousaios. Beginning with the 20th century, Sabbas has been presented as the spiritual patron of the city of Buzău as well as of several local villages.

Several graves (3rd to 5th centuries) were found in Buzău, as well as coins that prove the presence of a settlement on the territory of the modern city.

== Market town and bishopric in the Middle Ages ==
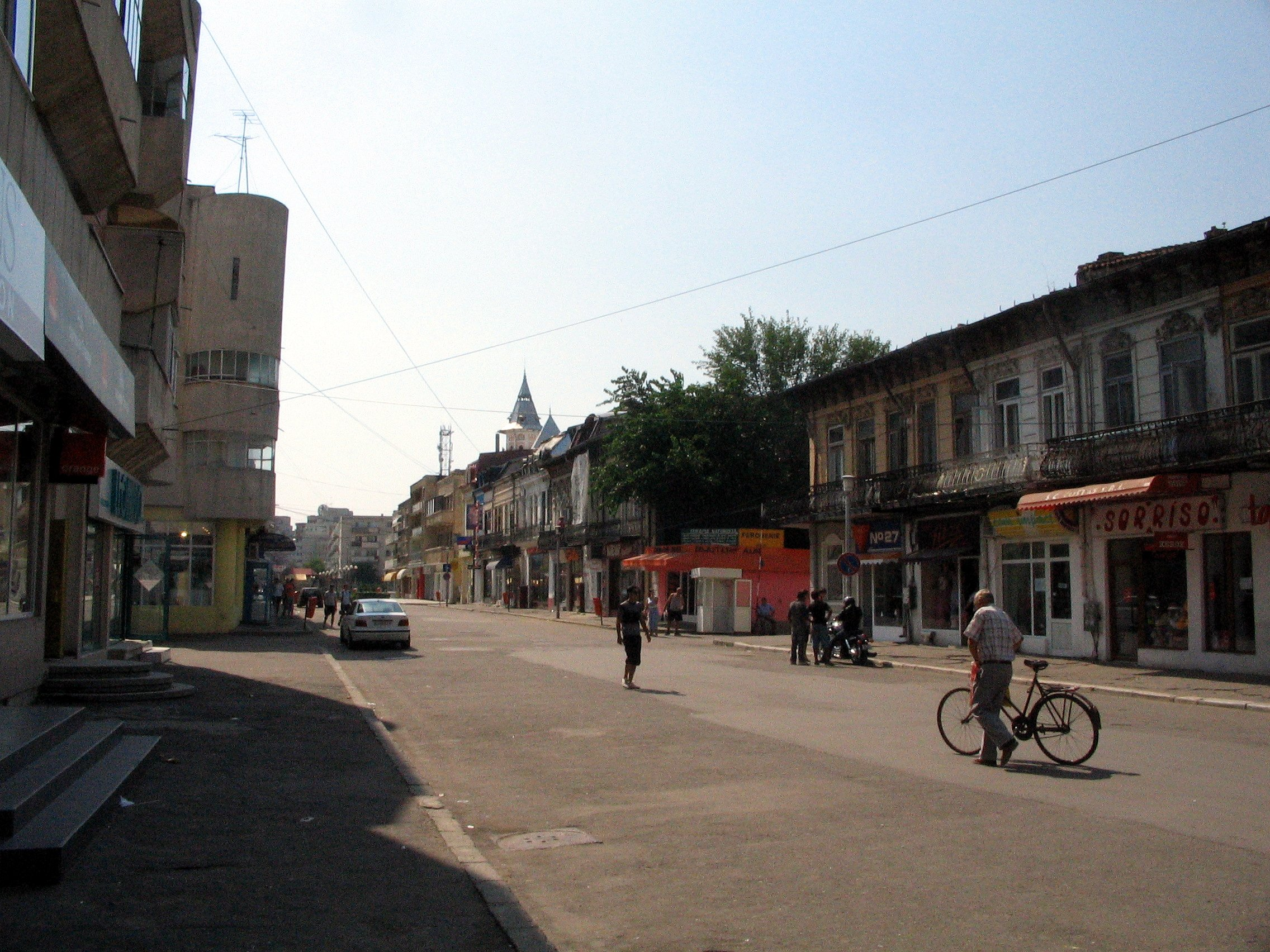
Cuza Vodă street, with the Communal Palace tower in the background

The earliest mention of Buzău as a market town (târg) and customs station is found in a document, dated January 31, 1431, and issued by Dan II, voivod of Wallachia. The document stated that salesmen from Brașov were free to trade in several Wallachian towns (Buzău, among them) just as they were during the reign of Mircea cel Bătrân. These privileges have been later reinforced by Vlad III the Impaler, who stated that the roads to be taken by the salesmen were to be: via Rucăr, Prahova, Teleajen or Buzău. Gustav Treiber, in his work Buzau, published in Siebenbürgische Vierteljahrsschrift (1935), states that prior to the 12th century, the city was surrounded by a wall with four gates towards the four main directions.

In 1500, Radu cel Mare created The Bishopric of Buzău, making the town a spiritual center of Eastern Wallachia. In 1507, Buzău appears (under the name of Boza) for the first time on a map, made by Nicolaus Germanus. At the time, the city was the 4th largest city of Wallachia, and an important trade partner of Brașov. Between 1503 and 1515, the salesmen from Buzău traded merchandise worth 2,245,835 aspres (an Ottoman currency). A document dated 1536 shows that the town was administered by one județ (mayor) and 12 elected pârgari (city councillors). Tunnels dating back to the 16th century connect the bishopric's complex, the city center and the Crâng Park (at the time, only a large forest at the town's outskirts). Their role was to store supply and evacuate people in case of danger.

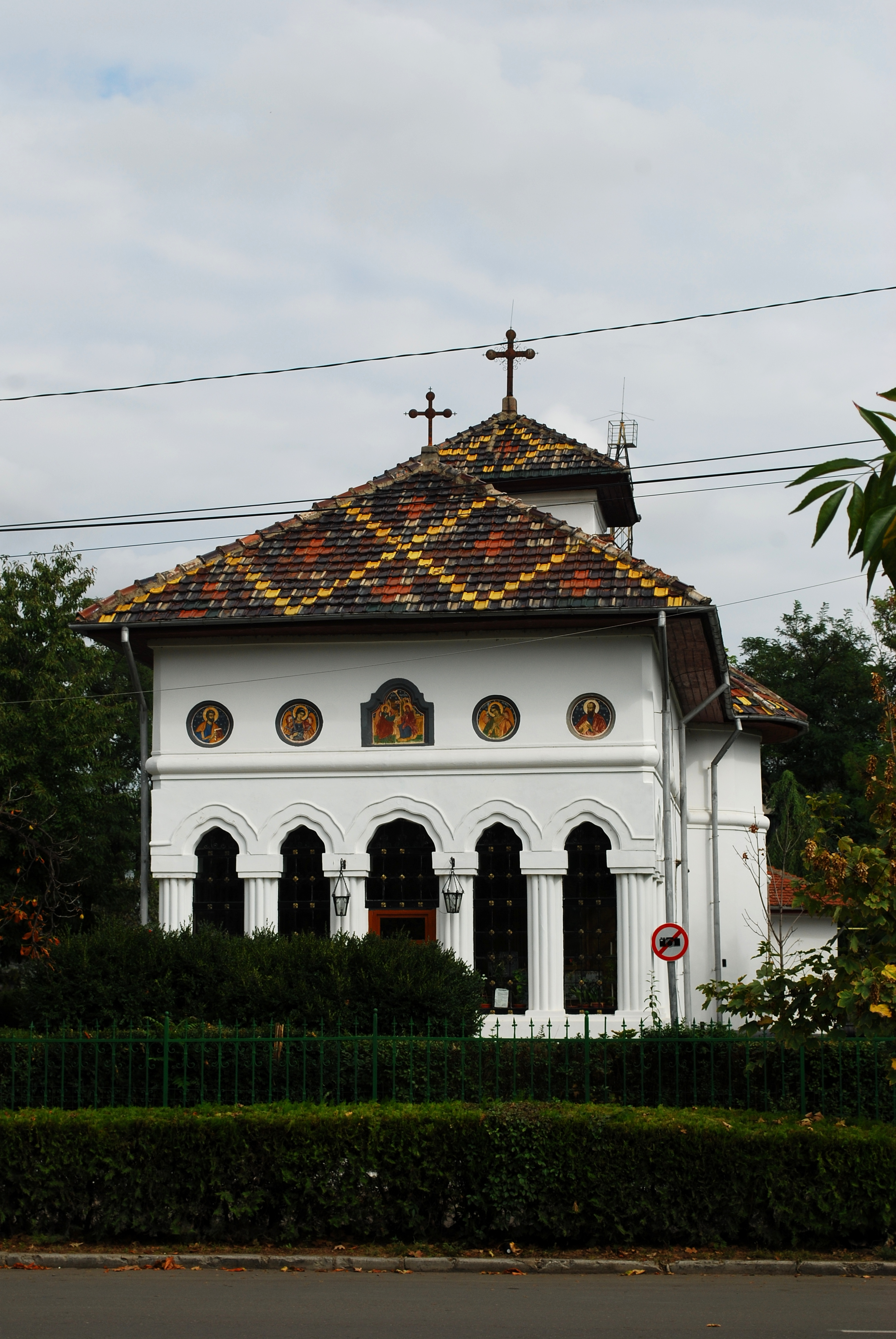
The Banu Church

In 1571, the Banu monastery was erected. The monastery's name, "Banu", indicates the nobility title of its builder, ban Andronic Cantacuzino. The monastery church was rebuilt by Andreiana, wife of Șerban Cantacuzino, in 1722. After the monastic assets secularizing act of 1863, the monastery was dismantled; its church, however, was spared.

A 1575 document mentions the bazaar (permanent market with shops, stores, cellars, storage rooms). The Bazaar of Buzău was the second oldest in Wallachia. At the end of the 16th century, Buzău was divided in four parts: the bishopric with its servants, the Banu monastery and its servants, the old market and the city (located between the bishopric and the monastery).

During the last decade of the 16th century, around 18,000 Serbs settled in Wallachia. Several families made Buzău their home, by founding a neighbourhood known to this day by the name Serbs and located on the bank of the Buzău River. Later, in 1792–1838, many Bulgarian refugees settled in the same neighbourhood. Due to similarities of the mother tongues spoken by the two ethnic groups, the locals called the new refugees also Serbs. The Bulgarians were given land by the river where they created vegetable gardens.

== Successive destructions ==
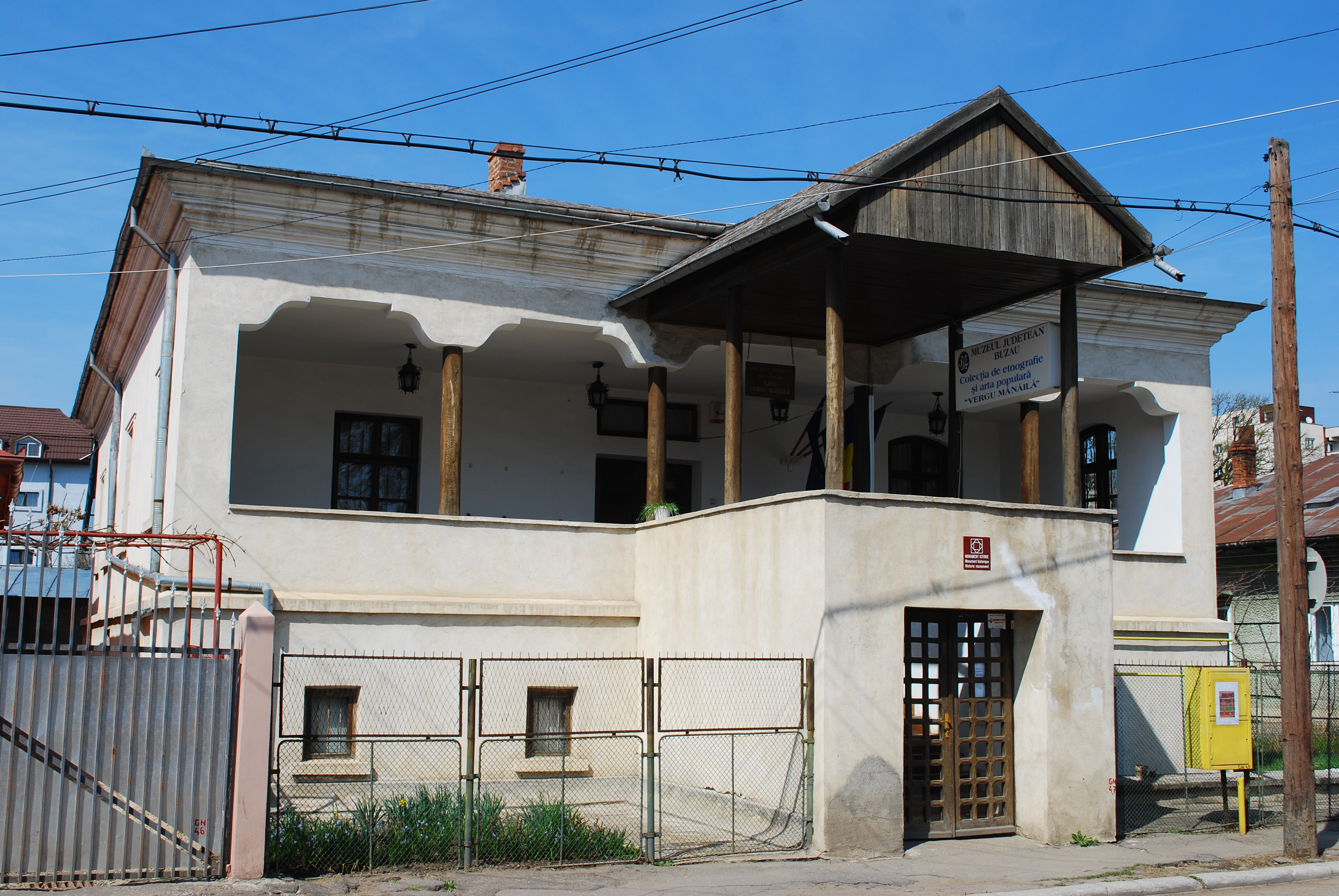
The Vergu-Mănăilă house, the oldest building of Buzău, dating back to the 1780s. It is the only building in Buzău dating back to the city's age of destructions (17th and 18th centuries).

The late Middle Ages brought a wave of destruction to the town, Buzău being completely or partially destroyed by multiple wars and foreign military invasions, as well as natural disasters.

The army of Mihai Viteazul was located in Buzău in 1596. After the army left, the city was devastated in 1597 by Ottoman and Tatar raids. The next year, Mihai Viteazul brought gifts to the inhabitants of the city to compensate for the damages. The chronicler Balthasar Walter described the tatar invasion of 1597:

They pillaged the plains around Buzău, Brăila, Bucharest and other cities which the Turks had either left untouched or not completely destroyed, took the locals captive and stole all the year's income, burning down most of the places.

In April 1616, many houses in Buzău were burnt down during a Polish invasion, during one of the Moldavian Magnate Wars. The inhabitants took refuge in the nearby mountains and forests. All existing land deeds were lost at the event. One year later, in July 1617, the city was once again occupied by the Ottoman army.

Buzău was pillaged by Tatars again in 1623, as pointed out by Matei Basarab in a 1633 letter:

[The Bishopric of Buzău] is entirely deserted, enslaved and burnt by the heathen Tatars during all these years.

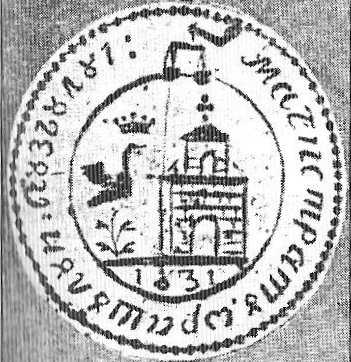
The oldest recorded seal of Buzău (1831), showing a phoenix, a symbol of the city's repeated rebirth after destruction

A Turkish invasion in 1659 again led to the city being burnt down and destroyed, and the locals being taken captive. In 1679, Buzău was pillaged again by the Ottomans. The city was rebuilt every time, thus appearing on a 1700 map of Wallachia, printed in Padova by stolnic Constantin Cantacuzino. The map shows 22 other cities and market towns of the country.

After a period of relative peace, during which the bishopric was subsidized by the domn to open a school in Greek and another in Slavonic, in 1739, during a Russo-Turkish War, Russian troops as well as Frilow's Cossacks ravaged through Buzău, taking the bishop with them as they went.

During another Russo-Turkish War, Ottoman soldiers burnt all the stores and houses, burning the city to the ground. The bishopric church was also destroyed, and the bishop moved temporarily to Bucharest. The Banu monastery church escaped destruction, only to be destroyed in 1774 by an earthquake. Also, during the Russo-Turkish War of 1787 - 1792, the city was once again destroyed. The long string of war-caused damage went on in 1806 and 1807, when the Ottoman army burnt down the city to ruins leaving 230 people dead. The locals fled to the Nișcov river valley, from where they returned only in 1812.

The cholera and bubonic plague epidemics at the beginning of the 19th century also decimated the city's population (see Caragea's plague).

The last time the city was devastated by war was in 1821 at the Greek War of Independence. After that, in light of the establishment of the Organic Regulations, a period of reconstruction and modernisation began. Also, Wallachia stopped being a theatre of operations in the wars between the Ottoman Empire and Russia, the conflicts moving further away, in Crimea, the Southern and Western Balkans and the Caucasus.

Thus, although Buzău's name is attested by documents as a river with a polis on its banks, since the 4th century, and as a market town since 1431, the oldest building in the city is the Vergu-Mănăilă house, erected as recently as the 18th century, around 1780. The Vergu-Mănăilă house was owned at the time by a high-ranking boyar named Vergu, who owned a pub and a bakery near the house.

== 19th-century development ==
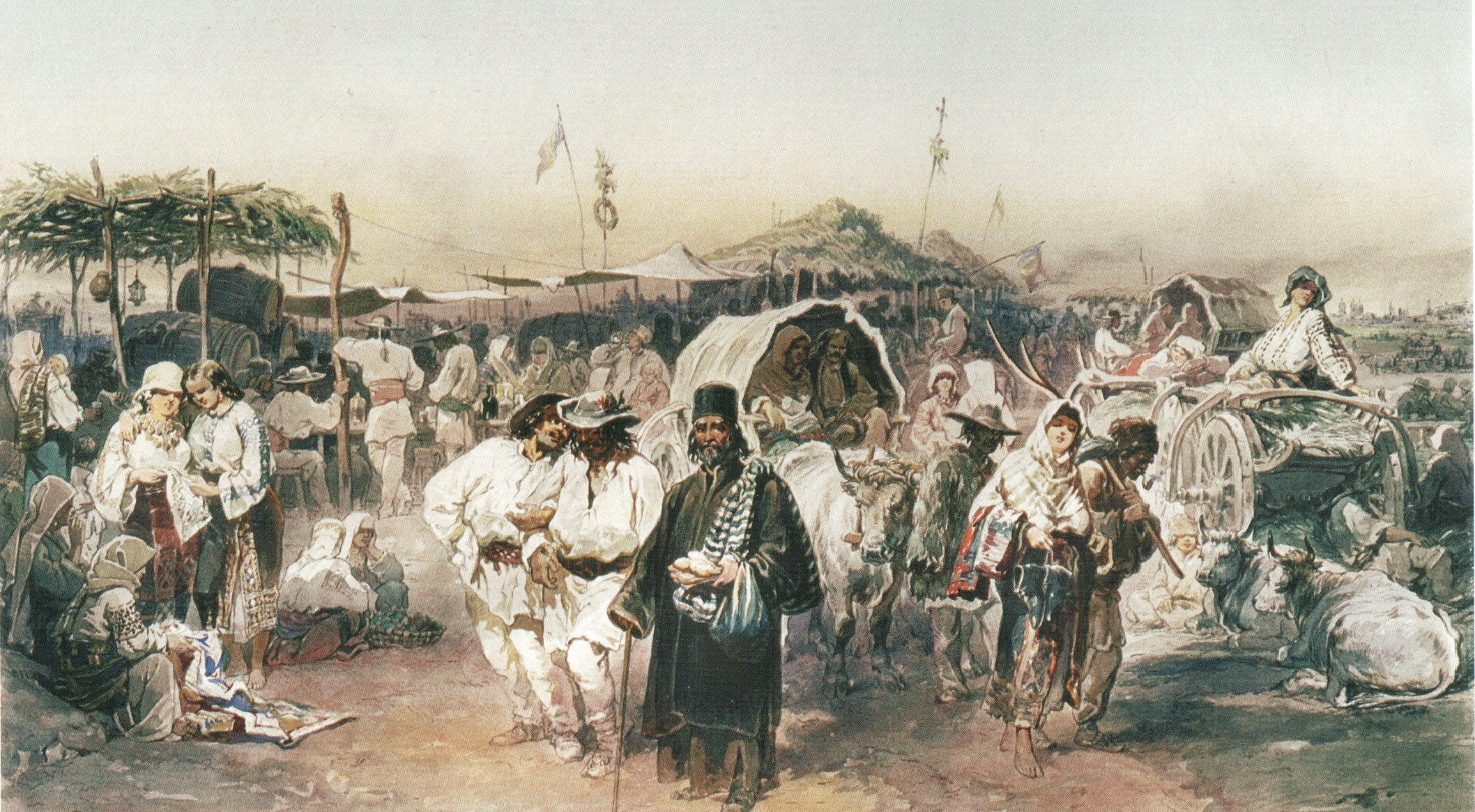
A fair in Buzău, 1869 watercolour by Amedeo Preziosi

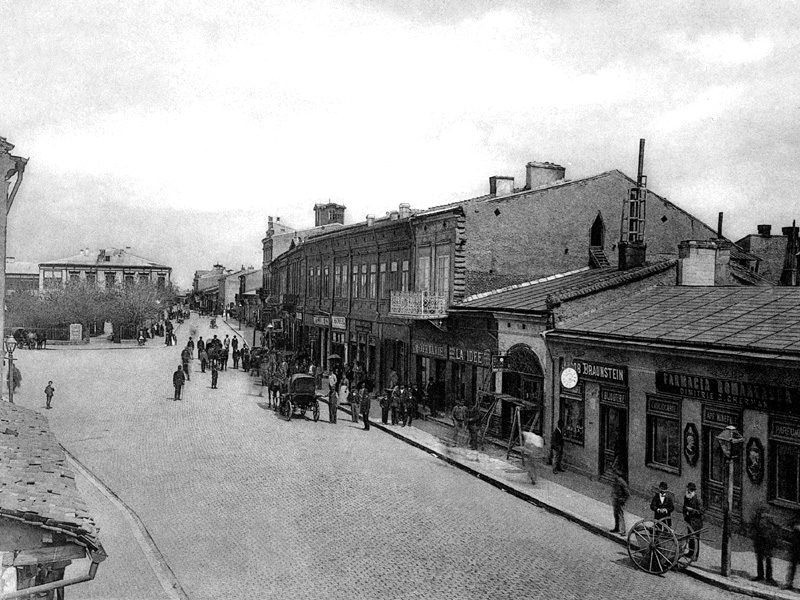
Buzău, c. 1901

During the 19th century, the city overcame the difficulties of repeated reconstruction, and started to develop as a modern city with solid businesses and a cultural life. The Crâng forest became a leisure place for the locals around 1829, and was eventually organized as a public garden by 1850.

Schools began to be set up, as in 1831 the bishopric opened a school for muralists and icon painters, led by Nicolae Teodorescu and attended by Gheorghe Tattarescu. One year later, the National School (the first school in Buzău to teach in the Romanian language) was open, and in 1838 Școala Normală (a school for teachers) was inaugurated by Dionisie Romano. Școala normală trained teachers for the city schools and for 115 villages. The Buzău theological seminar was open in 1836. It was the first secondary school in Buzău and the second theological school in Wallachia, after the one in Bucharest.

The oldest known census in Buzău showed, in 1832, a total population of 2567, of which one was Austrian, one was English, 18 were Jewish and the rest Romanian.

Around 1837–1840, public lighting was introduced on the main street. The street lamps were using tallow candles. By 1861, the number of public street lamps grew from 38 to 50. In 1841 the streets were realigned "by urban rules".

By 1842, the city had a stable doctor, a drugstore, a fire brigade and an officially authorised midwife.

During the Wallachian revolution of 1848, a "National Guard", supervised by Barbu and Nicolae Bălcescu was set up immediately after the government was organized in Bucharest in June. However, the revolution was crushed by Russian and Ottoman forces, and Buzău was occupied by the Russian army for three years. The Russian army briefly occupied Buzău again in 1853 during the Crimean War. After the occupation ended, the city's development was resumed.

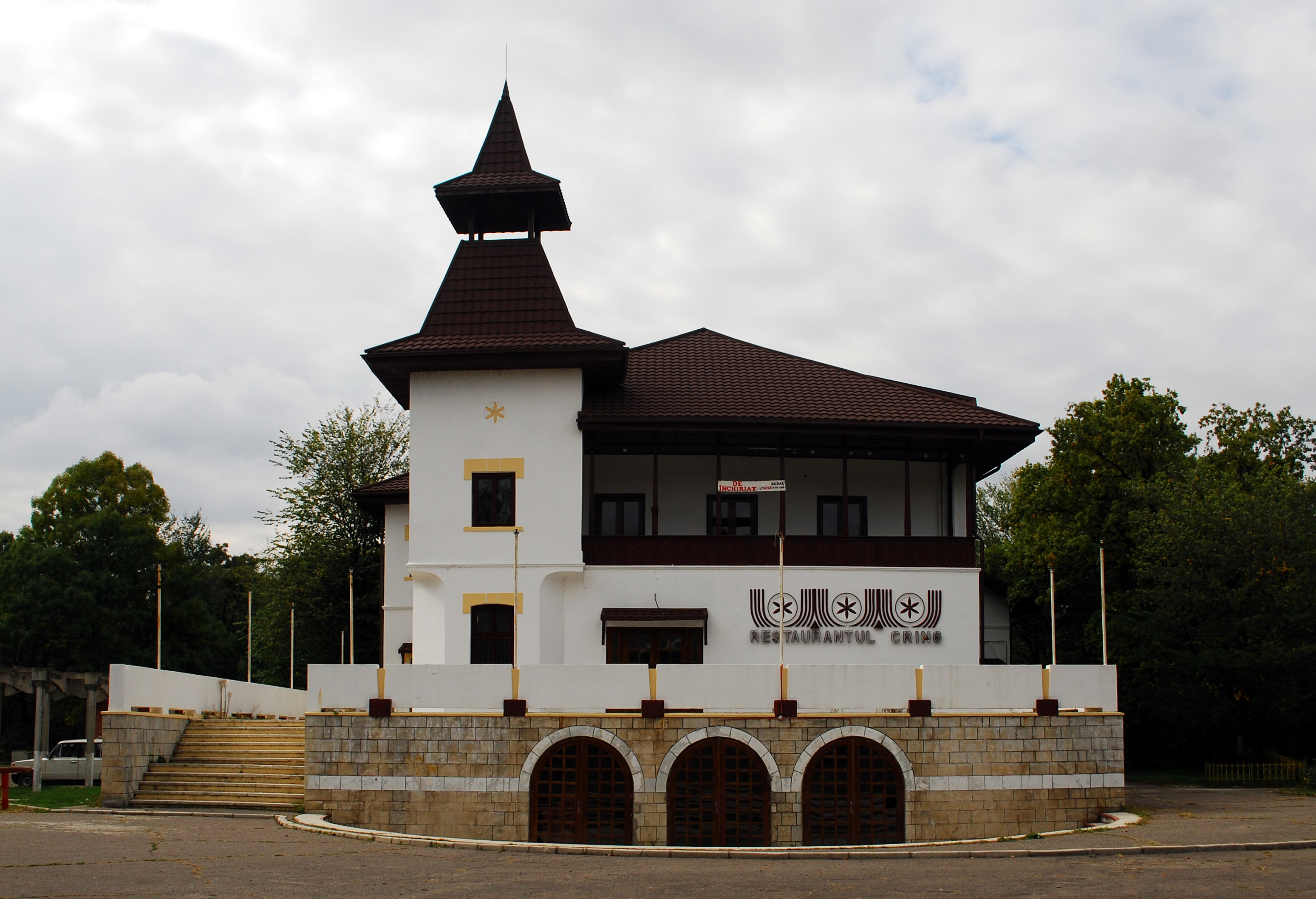
Crâng restaurant, built in 1897

At the Ad-hoc divans organised after the Congress of Paris in 1856, a large majority of representatives of Buzău voted for Wallachia's union with Moldova. Later on, after a personal union was completed on 5 February 1859, Prince Alexandru Ioan Cuza was welcomed enthusiastically by the inhabitants of Buzău and was persuaded to spend the night in the city on his way from Iași to Bucharest. The newly elected Domn of both Wallachia and Moldova left the city the next day via Strada Mare, a street known today by the name of Bulevardul Unirii (Union Boulevard).

The buildings on the Cuza Vodă Street (at the time known as Strada Târgului -- Market Street) were erected between 1850 and 1880 in the style of the 19th-century South-Eastern European commercial houses two-storey buildings with shops on the ground floor, and residences on the top floor.

Cultural life blossomed, as in 1852, the first theater show in Buzău took place. In 1854, a printing press was imported by the bishopric from Vienna, and was subsequently used to print the Buzău Bible, the fourth Romanian bible (the first three being the Bucharest Bible in 1688, one printed in Blaj in 1792 and another printed in Saint Petersburg in 1819).

Public lighting was enhanced in 1860 by introducing petrol lamps. In the same year, street numbers were assigned to houses, and streets were paved with stones. The Gârlași Hospital (nowadays, the Infectious Diseases Hospital) was open in 1865, being the first permanent city hospital.

The Moldavia theater was open in 1898 in a building in central Buzău. The 400-seat hall was the location where important Romanian artists that came to Buzău, such as Nicolae Leonard, Constantin Nottara and George Enescu performed.

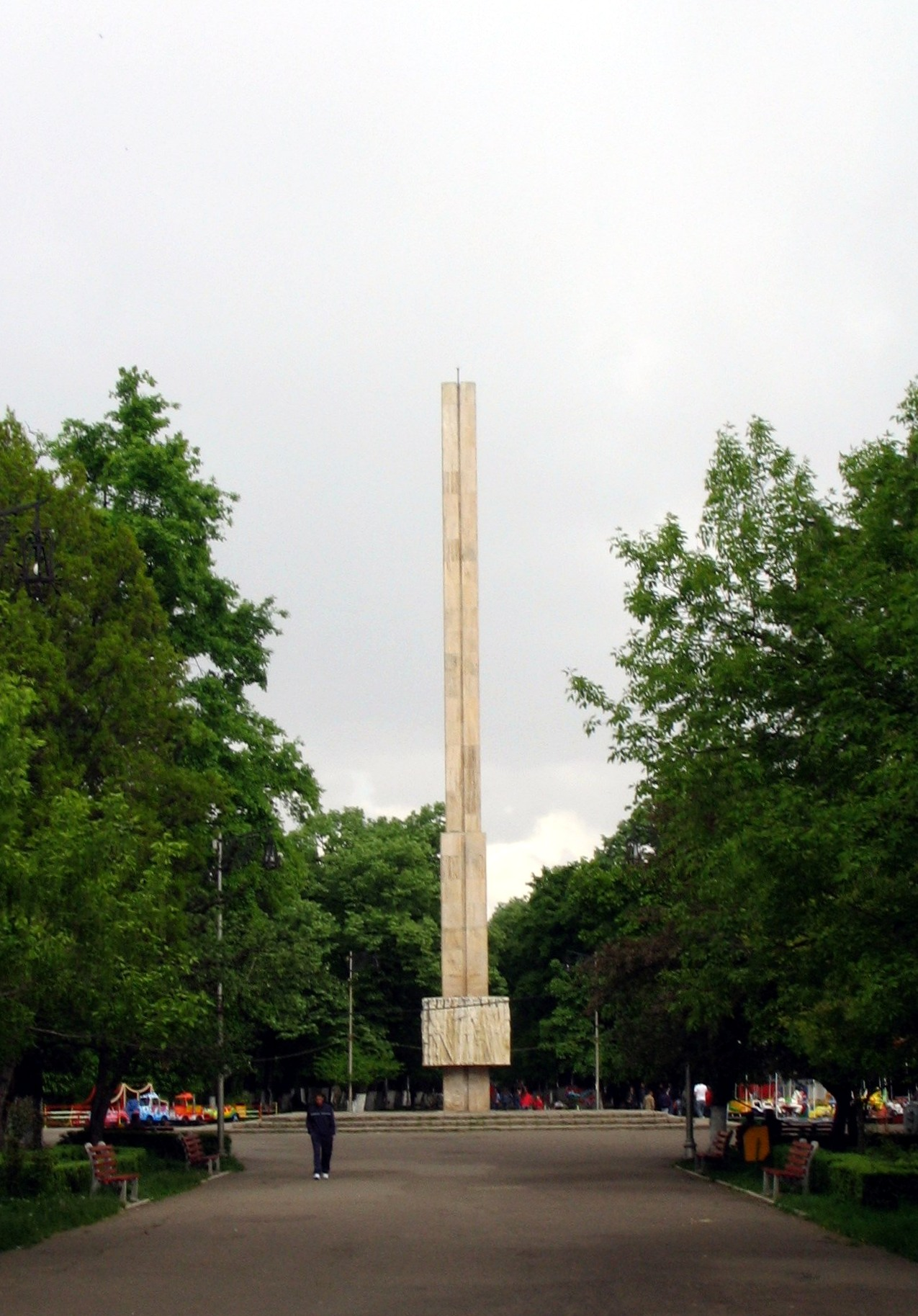
The obelisk in Crâng Park

In 1899, mayor Nicu Constantinescu began the construction of the Communal Palace, a project completed in 1903. The Communal Palace is now the city's most prominent landmark. Constantinescu also decided to refactor the central streets of Buzău, which were narrow and winding, a heritage of the market town history and the repeated destructions followed by disorganized rebuilding of the city. Thus, the wide and straight Park Boulevard (linking the city center and the Crâng Park) and the Railway Station Boulevard (linking the center to the railway station) were built.

During this period, Constantin Brâncuși and Ion Luca Caragiale were briefly residents of Buzău. Caragiale leased a restaurant near the railway station in 1894 and lived there for a year. During this period, he also held a public conference, whose intended subject, Prose writing techniques was changed at the last moment into Causes of human stupidity. Brâncuși lived in the city in the summer of 1914, after Eliza Seceleanu, a young local landowner's widow, had commissioned him to create two sculptures: Prayer and the bust of Petre Stănescu, her late husband. After creating the two sculptures in Paris, Brâncuși brought them to Buzău and lived there for a few months while working to prepare the sculptures' stands. Both sculptures decorated Stănescu's tomb at the local Dumbrava cemetery for a while, but they were since moved to the National Museum of Art of Romania in Bucharest, being replaced by two copies. The copies have been stolen in 1999 and have not been replaced since.

The first electric light bulb in the city was installed in 1899, in front of the public garden in the center of Buzău. The first cinema show in Buzău took place in 1904, in a beer pub on the Park Boulevard, by a local named Nicolae Mihăilescu.

== World wars and the interbellum ==
During World War I, the city was occupied, from 14 December 1916 to 14 November 1918, by German forces, and many of the inhabitants took refuge in Moldavia or in the country side. Buzău returned to Romanian administration at the end of the war.

After 1918, Buzău continued to develop, slowly becoming an industrial centre. Also, a football team, named Vârtejul was created in 1921, and the first boxing match in Buzău took place in 1931, when a sports newspaper was first printed.

The most important mayor of Buzău between the two world wars was Stan Săraru, who erected in 1935 a modern food market, which nowadays is the most important market in the city and is named the Stan Săraru market. He also started the construction of the Crâng Stadium, and a public bathhouse and paved the main streets with cobblestone.

An eagle, nicknamed Ilie by the locals and raised by a salesman who lived nearby was the railway station's mascot between 1930 and 1943. Ilie came to the train station often, and ate out of people's hands. The eagle died during World War II, shot by Nazi soldiers. A beer brewed in Buzău was named Vulturul (The eagle), and a street in Buzău was named Strada Vulturului (Eagle Street) in his memory.

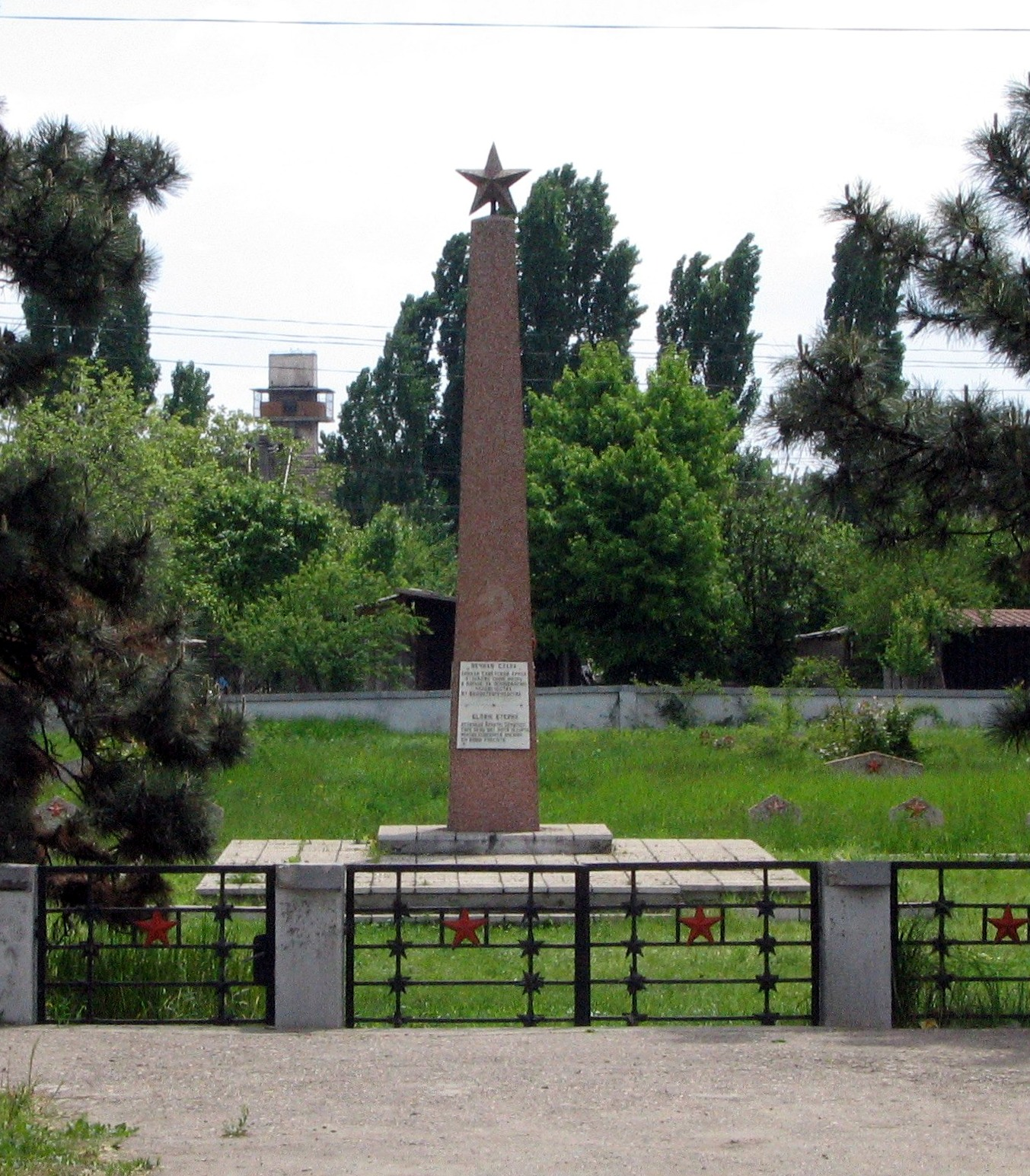
Soviet soldiers' monument at the Buzău Heroes Cemetery

During World War II, Soviet troops occupied Buzău in August 1944, and, as German soldiers were barricaded inside the Communal Palace, its tower was knocked down by cannons. The tower was rebuilt after the war. Heavy fighting took place in the area after August 23, 1944, when Marshal Ion Antonescu was arrested in Bucharest and his pro-Nazi government overthrown. The Heroes' Cemetery, which lies in the western part of the city, is the burial ground of the Soviet, German, and Romanian soldiers who died at that time.

== Communist period ==
After the war, when Romanian government was taken over by a communist regime, Buzău lost its county seat status in 1952, being included in the Ploiești Region. Then Buzău county was later reinstated in 1968.

All the factories in Buzău were nationalised and the central government in Bucharest ran a policy of building monotonous and drab blocks of flats. Consequently, some old neighborhoods in Buzău were demolished to make way for the new buildings. Before 1953, the residential areas were exclusively made up of houses, but many of them were razed to build blocks of flats. The process was slow at first, but between 1980 and 1988, all the houses on the main street of the city were demolished and blocks of flats were built. During that time, many historic buildings were destroyed, such as the Moldavia theatre. Of the historic city center, only the Cuza Vodă street buildings escaped demolition. Also, in 1969, a residential area was built into the Crâng Park, reducing its size. This development was sometimes chaotic, as it happened in 1985, when the new Unirii Boulevard was rerouted by mayor Dochia who ordered that the foundations of some blocks that were being built be buried during one night and the street to run over the covered foundations.

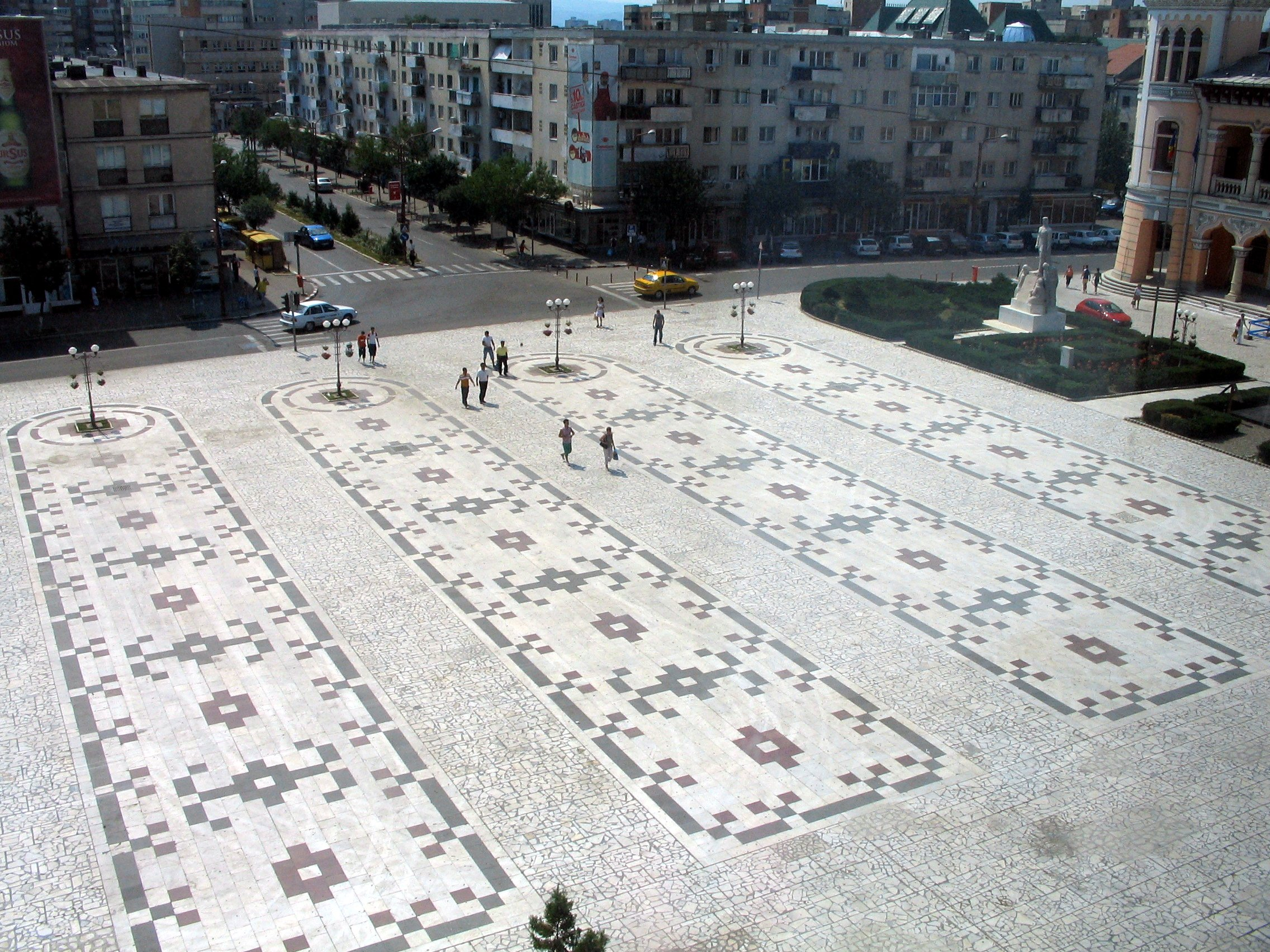
The marble patterns on the Dacia square, similar to traditional costumes from Bisoca

Forced industrialization took place during the communist regime, as the Buzău-South industrial platform was inaugurated in 1963. The location was chosen as to use some barren land and to have the local winds move the pollution away from the city.

However, some city improvements have also been made during this period. The Tineretului Park was built in the eastern side of the city, with a sports hall and a swimming pool. In 1981, a movie theater with 650 seats was open, and a major hospital was built in 1971–1973. In 1976, the city celebrated 1,600 years since its oldest historical attestation. To mark the event, an obelisk was erected in Crâng Park. In the same year, the Dacia square, the city's main square located in front of the Communal Palace, was repaved, with white, red and grey Măgura marble, with patterns similar to those on traditional folk costumes from the Bisoca area.

== Post-communism (1990-present day) ==
The process of demolition of homes was stopped after the fall of Communism in Romania, in late December 1989. The city's economy stagnated for some years, but Buzău slowly started to develop, as state-owned factories were privatized and some new industries emerged.

Construction work for an Orthodox cathedral, called the St. Sava Cathedral, was started in 1991. In 1995, a theater was opened once again in Buzău, and called the George Ciprian Theater.

In 2021, there was a proposal to unite Buzău with the commune of Țintești. This project, known as "Buzău Mare 2021" ("Greater Buzău 2021"), aimed to double Buzău in size and to develop the city more extensively once united with Țintești. This new Buzău would have some 120,000 inhabitants and the planned A7 motorway would go through the middle of the city. The idea came from the mayor of Buzău, Constantin Toma. On 26 September 2021, a referendum was done to decide if Buzău and Țintești would be united or not, and 43.03% of the inhabitants of Țintești voted on it. However, only 10.03% of those of Buzău did so, and due to the low turnout, below the legal threshold of 30%, the results were considered null and Țintești and Buzău remained separate.
