= Câmpulungeanca =

- Location within Romania

Location
- Country: Romania
- Counties: Buzău County
- Villages: Câmpulungeanca

Physical characteristics
- Mouth: Slănic
  - location: Dogari
  - coordinates: 45.4140°N 26.7503°E
  - elevation: 276 m (906 ft)
- Length: 10 km (6.2 mi)
- Basin size: 18 km^{2} (6.9 sq mi)

Basin features
- Progression: Slănic→ Buzău→ Siret→ Danube→ Black Sea

The Câmpulungeanca is a left tributary of the river Slănic in Romania. It discharges into the Slănic in Dogari. Its length is 10 km (6.2 mi) and its basin size is 18 km^{2} (6.9 sq mi).
