= Vârteju =

Vârteju may refer to several villages in Romania:

- Vârteju, a village in Lopătari Commune, Buzău County
- Vârteju, a village in the town of Măgurele, Ilfov County
