= Coca (Slănic) =

River in Romania

- Location within Romania

Location
- Country: Romania
- Counties: Buzău County

Physical characteristics
- Mouth: Slănic
  - location: Niculești
  - coordinates: 45°26′20″N 26°44′23″E
  - elevation: 284 m (932 ft)
- Length: 8 km (5.0 mi)
- Basin size: 16 km^{2} (6.2 sq mi)

Basin features
- Progression: Slănic→ Buzău→ Siret→ Danube→ Black Sea

The Coca is a right tributary of the river Slănic in Romania. It discharges into the Slănic in Niculești. Its length is 8 km (5.0 mi) and its basin size is 16 km^{2} (6.2 sq mi).
