= Sările-Bisoca mine =

Salt mine in Buzău County, Romania

- Location: Bisoca, Buzău County, Romania
- Products: Sodium chloride
- Company: Salrom

The Sările-Bisoca mine is a large salt mine located in eastern Romania in Buzău County, close to Bisoca. Sările-Bisoca has one of the largest salt reserves in Romania having estimated reserves of 13 billion tonnes of sodium chloride.
