= Homocioaia =

- Location within Romania

Location
- Country: Romania
- Counties: Buzău County

Physical characteristics
- Mouth: Slănic
  - location: Gura Dimienii
  - coordinates: 45°24′12″N 26°45′45″E
  - elevation: 246 m (807 ft)
- Length: 7 km (4.3 mi)
- Basin size: 21 km^{2} (8.1 sq mi)

Basin features
- Progression: Slănic→ Buzău→ Siret→ Danube→ Black Sea

The Homocioaia is a left tributary of the river Slănic in Romania. It discharges into the Slănic in Gura Dimienii. Its length is 7 km (4.3 mi) and its basin size is 21 km^{2} (8.1 sq mi).
