= Izvoru Dulce =

Izvoru Dulce may refer to several villages in Romania:

- Izvoru Dulce, a village in Beceni Commune, Buzău County
- Izvoru Dulce, a village in Merei Commune, Buzău County
