= Maria-Ana Tupan =

Romanian university professor and literary critic

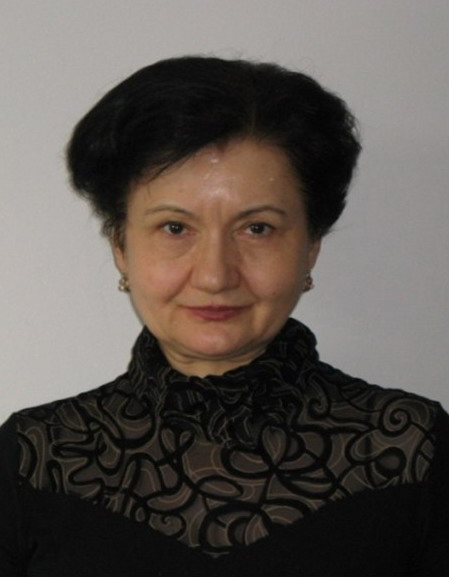
- Born: April 19, 1949 (age 77); Sărulești, Buzău, Romanian People's Republic
- Education: University of Bucharest
- Occupations: Literary critic, essayist, literary theorist
- Writing career
- Language: Romanian, English
- Period: 1990–present

Maria-Ana Tupan (born April 19, 1949) is a Romanian university professor, literary critic, and translator. She is a member of the "Criticism and Literary History" section of the Writers' Union of Romania and several international scientific societies. Tupan is also a PhD Supervisor at the Doctoral School of 1 Decembrie 1918 University of Alba Iulia.

== Life ==
Maria-Ana Tupan was born in Sărulești, Buzău County, Romania, the daughter of Margareta (née Constantin) and Spiridon Iordache, a priest. After graduating from Mihai Eminescu high school in Buzău in 1967, she studied English and German at the Languages Department of the University of Bucharest, where she graduated in 1972 as a valedictorian. She was editor (1972–1975) of the English version of the magazine Cărți românești (Romanian Books).

Tupan made her publishing debut in 1980 with Regele visurilor (The King of Dreams), an anthology of translations from American prose of the 19th century. She obtained her PhD degree in 1992, under the supervision of Leon Levițchi and Alexandru Duțu.

From 1991 until 2014, Tupan was a faculty member of the University of Bucharest. In 1994–1995 she was affiliated with Pennsylvania State University as visiting professor under the Fulbright Scholars Program. In 2014 she completed her habilitation thesis and became affiliated with the Doctoral School of Alba Iulia University, supervising PhD students.

Tupan has been a member of the Writers' Union of Romania, the Section of Criticism and Literary History since 1996. She is also a member of the German Gesellschaft für Fantastikforschung and of The Charles Brockden Brown Society.

== Works ==
She wrote works on literary history, literary theory, comparative literature, genre theory, and cultural studies. She is a specialist in Anglo-Saxon literature and German and French cultures, and is attracted by the methods of deconstruction. Her 17 books and a number of articles published in Europe, India, United States, and Australia are based on theoretical underpinnings falling within the fields of epistemology of literature, philosophy of culture, literary history and theory. Her literary chronicles and essays have been published in Convorbiri literare, Contemporanul, Luceafărul, România literară, Viața Românească magazines. She presented papers at conferences in Athens, University Park (Penn State University), Madrid, Manchester, Salzburg, Vienna, Dresden, Graz, Rome, Cologne, and Dortmund.

=== Selected publications ===
- A Survey Course in British Literature București: Editura Universității din București, 1997 ISBN 973-575-835-0
- British Literature. An Overview (București: Editura Universității din București, 2005) ISBN 973-737-086-4
- The New Literary History (București: Editura Universității din București, 2006) ISBN 978-973-737-205-5
- Genre and Postmodernism (București: Editura Universitatii din București, 2008) ISBN 978-973-737-572-8
- Modernismul si psihologia. Încercare de epistemologie literara. Modernism and Psychology. An Inquiry into the Epistemology of Literary Modernism (București: Editura Academiei Române, 2009) ISBN 978-973-27-1826-1
- Literary Discourses of the New Physics. With an Introduction by Marin Cilea (București: Editura Universității din București, 2010) ISBN 978-973-737-787-6
- Teoria și practica literaturii la inceput de mileniu. (București: Editura Contemporanul, 2011) ISBN 978-606-92683-0-8
- Postmodernist Energetics: Peter Ackroyd's Museum Spac (The Museal Turn. Edited by Sabine Coelsch-Foisner. Winter Verlag. Heidelberg University Press, 2012)ISBN 978-3-8253-6097-9
- Relativism/ Relativity: An Interdisciplinary Perspective on a Modern Concept (Cambridge Scholars Publishing, 2013) ISBN 978-1-4438-4744-5
- Realismul magic. Încercare genealogică. București (Editura Academiei, 2013) ISBN 978-973-27-2393-7
- "The Zone: Ontological or Epistemological Operator?” (Eds. Christine Lötscher, Petra Schrackmann, Ingrid Tomkowiak, Aleta-Amirée von Holzen, Transitions and Dissolving Boundaries in the Fantastic. Reihe: Fantastikforschung / Research in the Fantastic. Berlin-Munster-Wien-Zurich-London: LIT Verlag, 2014. ISBN 978-3-643-80185-2
- The Kantian Legacy. Essays in Epistemology and Aesthetics. Cambridge Scholars Publishing, 2016. ISBN 978-1-4438-9750-1
- "Early Modern Essays: the Harmonics of the Discourse of Authority” in The Essays: Forms and Transformations. Ed. Dorothea Flothow, Markus Oppolzer, Sabine Coelsch-Foisner. Heidelberg: Universitatsverlag Winter, 2017 ISBN 978-3-8253-6687-2
- "The Shakespearean Search for Archetypes: The Mirror and the Signet. Cambridge Scholars Publishing, (2020) ISBN 978-1-5275-9948-2
- "Special Issue on Poetics of Self-construal in Postcolonial Literature". Rupkatha Journal of Interdisciplinary Studies in the Humanities. 15 (5). 2023.
- Phenomenology and Cultural Difference in High Modernism, Cambridge Scholars Publishing (2023) ISBN 978-1-5275-0492-9
- "Debasish Lahiri’s Transgressive Ontologies". London Journal of Humanities and Social Science. Volume 24 . Issue 7, 24.05.2024.

== Awards and honors ==
- Romanian Writers' Union Award for Translation and World Literature, 1996.
- Convorbiri Literare Magazine Award for Anglistics, 2000.
- National Award for Excellence in Theory, History and Literary Criticism awarded by Contemporanul magazine, 2019.
