= Cernătești, Buzău =

Cernătești
- Commune
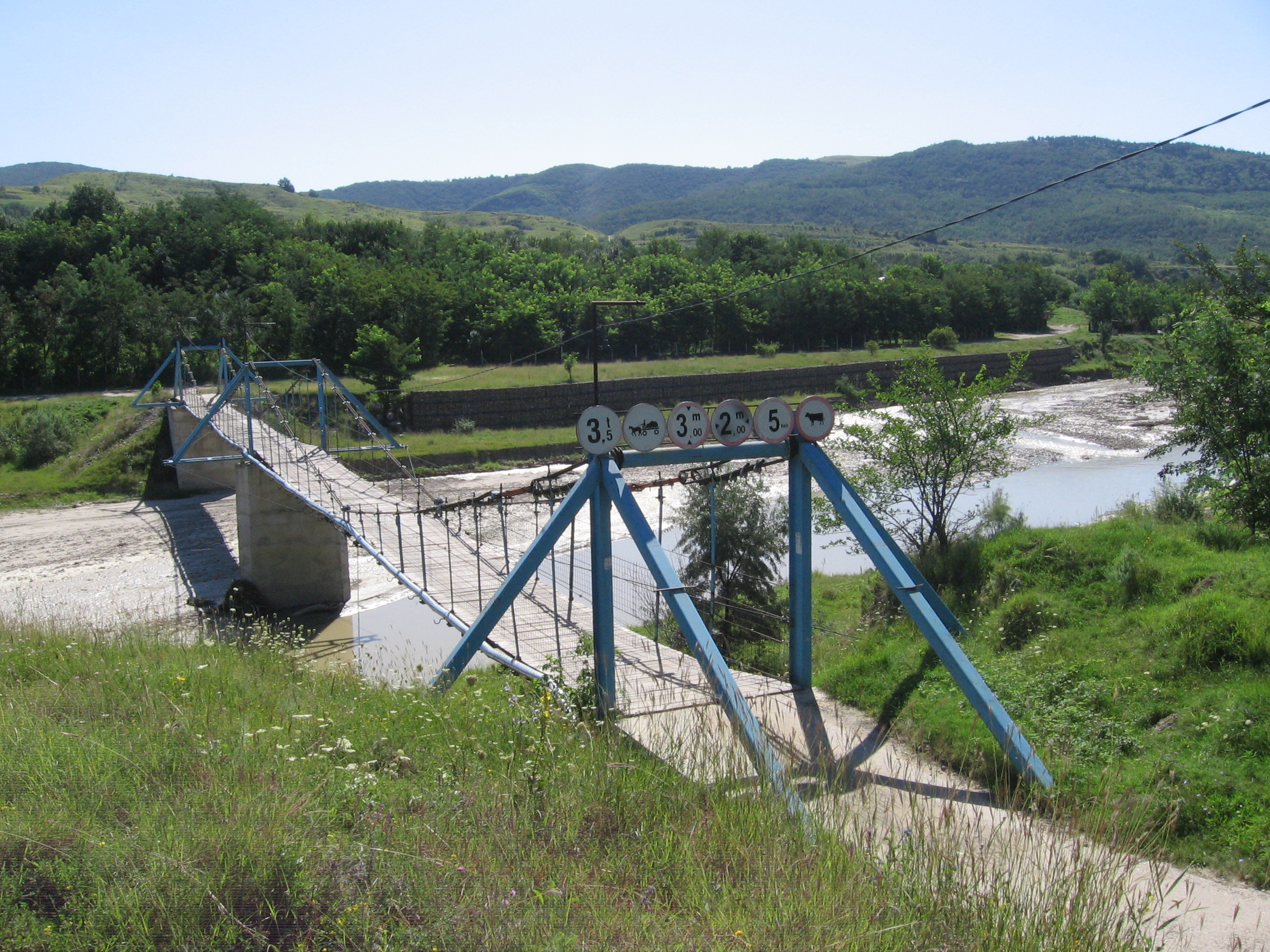
- Bridge in Manasia

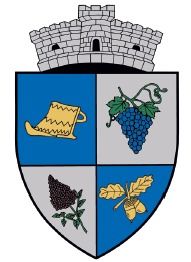
- Coat of arms

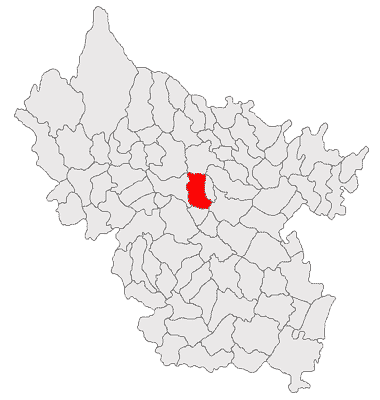
- Location in Buzău County

- Location in Romania
- Coordinates: 45°16′N 26°46′E
- Country: Romania
- County: Buzău
- Subdivisions: Aldeni, Băești, Căldărușa, Cernătești, Fulga, Manasia, Vlădeni, Zărneștii de Slănic

Government
  - Mayor (2020–2024): Petrache Mîrzea (PSD)
- Area: 50.55 km^{2} (19.52 sq mi)
- Elevation: 149 m (489 ft)
- Population (2021-12-01): 3,659
  - Density: 72.38/km^{2} (187.5/sq mi)
- Time zone: UTC+02:00 (EET)
  - Summer (DST): UTC+03:00 (EEST)
- Postal code: 127150
- Area code: +(40) 238
- Vehicle reg.: BZ
- Website: cernatesti.ro

Cernătești is a commune in Buzău County, Muntenia, Romania, located in the Subcarpathian hills, in the valley of the river Slănic. It is composed of eight villages: Aldeni, Băești, Căldărușa, Cernătești, Fulga, Manasia, Vlădeni, and Zărneștii de Slănic. The 2021 census showed a population of 3,659 inhabitants.

Historical population
Year	Pop.	±%
2002	4,027	—
2011	3,847	−4.5%
2021	3,659	−4.9%
Source: Census data

== Natives ==
- Ion Băieșu (1933–1992), playwright, novelist, and movie and television writer
