= Jghiab =

Jghiab Jgheab
- Location within Romania

Location
- Country: Romania
- Counties: Buzău County
- Villages: Jghiab, Gura Bădicului, Mânzălești

Physical characteristics
- Mouth: Slănic
  - location: Mânzălești
  - coordinates: 45°29′23″N 26°38′25″E
  - elevation: 403 m (1,322 ft)
- Length: 13 km (8.1 mi)
- Basin size: 51 km^{2} (20 sq mi)

Basin features
- Progression: Slănic→ Buzău→ Siret→ Danube→ Black Sea
- Tributaries
  - left: Plavăț

The Jghiab or Jgheab is a left tributary of the river Slănic in Romania. It discharges into the Slănic in Mânzălești. Its length is 13 km (8.1 mi) and its basin size is 51 km^{2} (20 sq mi).
