= Vintilă Vodă =

- Commune
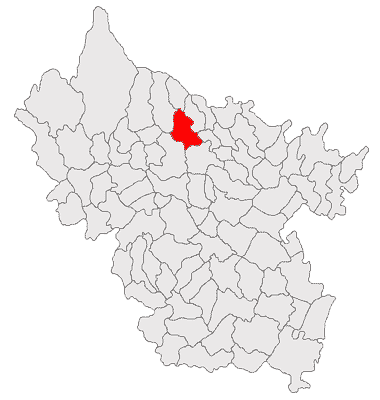
- Location in Buzău County

- Location in Romania
- Coordinates: 45°28′N 26°43′E
- Country: Romania
- County: Buzău
- Subdivisions: Bodinești, Coca Antimirești, Coca Niculești, Niculești, Petrăchești, Podu Muncii, Sârbești, Smeești, Vintilă Vodă

Government
  - Mayor (2020–2024): Ion Coman (PSD)
- Area: 46.83 km^{2} (18.08 sq mi)
- Elevation: 335 m (1,099 ft)
- Population (2021-12-01): 2,540
  - Density: 54.2/km^{2} (140/sq mi)
- Time zone: EET/EEST (UTC+2/+3)
- Postal code: 127675
- Area code: +(40) 238
- Vehicle reg.: BZ
- Website: comunavintilavoda.ro

Vintilă Vodă is a commune in Buzău County, Muntenia, Romania. It is composed of nine villages: Bodinești, Coca Antimirești, Coca Niculești, Niculești, Petrăchești, Podu Muncii, Sârbești, Smeești, and Vintilă Vodă.

The commune is located in the northern part of the county, 45 km (28 mi) from the county seat, Buzău. It lies in a hilly area at the foot of the Curvature Carpathians, on the banks of the Slănic River. Vintilă Vodă is traversed by county road DJ203K, which connects it to Buzău to the south and to Mânzălești to the northwest.

Historical population
| Year | Pop. | ±% |
|---|---|---|
| 2002 | 3,416 | — |
| 2011 | 3,131 | −8.3% |
| 2021 | 2,540 | −18.9% |
Source: Census data
