= Sărulești, Buzău =

Sărulești
- Commune
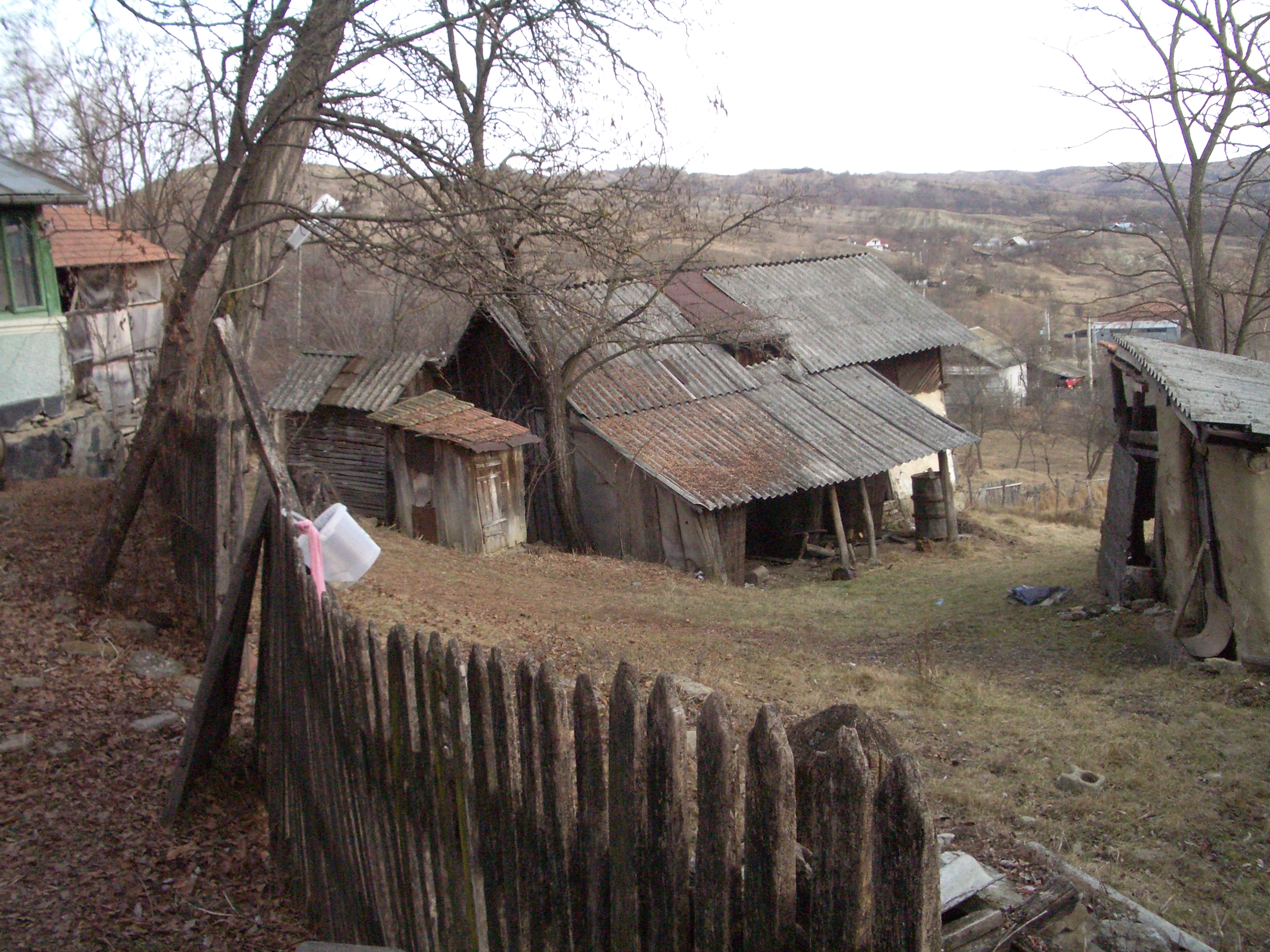

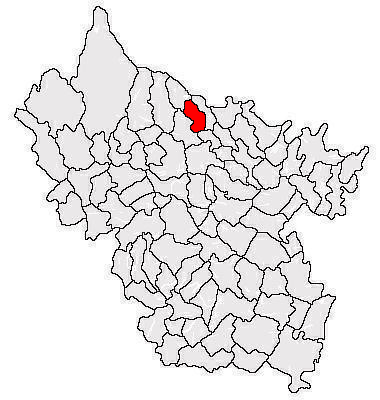
- Location in Buzău County

- Location in Romania
- Coordinates: 45°30′N 26°45′E
- Country: Romania
- County: Buzău

Government
  - Mayor (2020–2024): Nicolae Dinu (PSD)
- Area: 33.65 km^{2} (12.99 sq mi)
- Elevation: 355 m (1,165 ft)
- Population (2021-12-01): 1,068
  - Density: 31.74/km^{2} (82.20/sq mi)
- Time zone: UTC+02:00 (EET)
  - Summer (DST): UTC+03:00 (EEST)
- Postal code: 127545
- Area code: +(40) 238
- Vehicle reg.: BZ
- Website: primariasarulesti.ro

Sărulești is a commune in Buzău County, Muntenia, Romania. It is composed of seven villages: Cărătnău de Jos, Cărătnău de Sus, Goicelu, Sările-Cătun, Sărulești, Valea Largă-Sărulești, and Valea Stânei.

Historical population
Year	Pop.	±%
2002	1,578	—
2011	1,346	−14.7%
2021	1,068	−20.7%
Source: Census data

== Natives ==
- Maria-Ana Tupan (born 1949), professor, literary critic, and translator
