= Lopătari =

- Commune
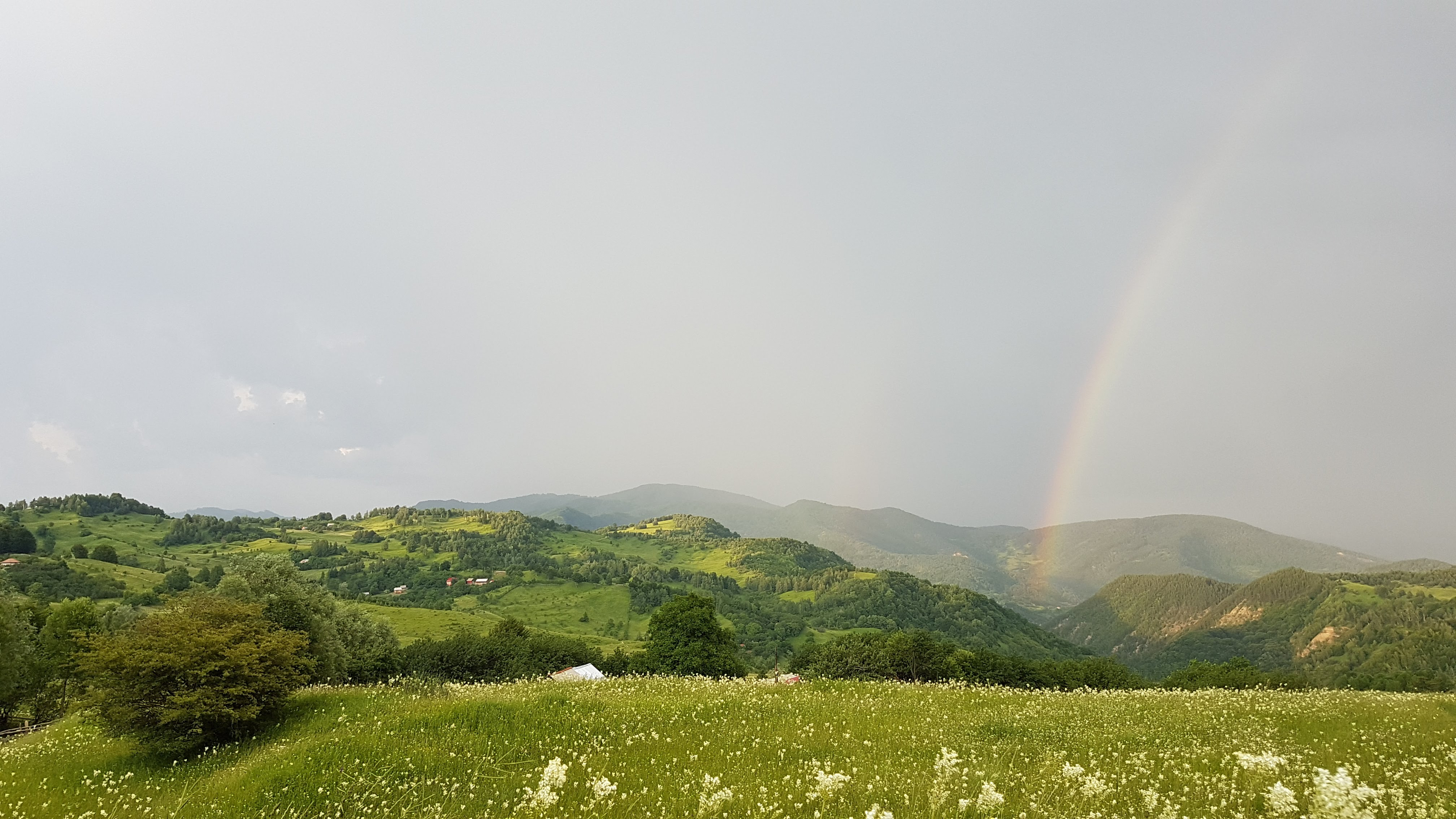

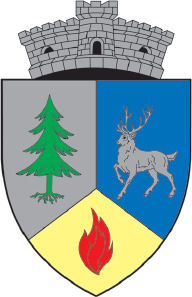
- Coat of arms

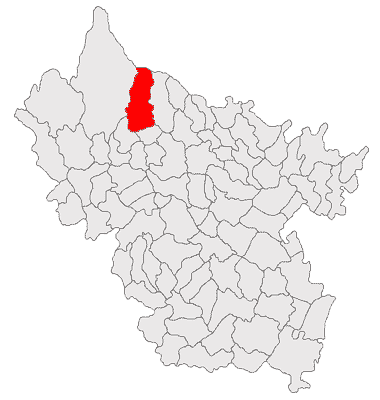
- Location in Buzău County

- Location in Romania
- Coordinates: 45°29′N 26°35′E
- Country: Romania
- County: Buzău
- Subdivisions: Brebu, Fundata, Lopătari, Luncile, Pestrițu, Plaiu Nucului, Ploștina, Potecu, Săreni, Terca, Vârteju

Government
  - Mayor (2020–2024): Claudiu Constantin (USR PLUS)
- Area: 103.31 km^{2} (39.89 sq mi)
- Elevation: 460 m (1,510 ft)
- Population (2021-12-01): 2,999
  - Density: 29.03/km^{2} (75.19/sq mi)
- Time zone: UTC+02:00 (EET)
  - Summer (DST): UTC+03:00 (EEST)
- Postal code: 127295
- Area code: +(40) 238
- Vehicle reg.: BZ
- Website: comunalopatari.ro

Lopătari is a commune in Buzău County, Muntenia, Romania. It is composed of eleven villages: Brebu, Fundata, Lopătari, Luncile, Pestrițu, Plaiu Nucului, Ploștina, Potecu, Săreni, Terca, and Vârteju.

Historical population
Year	Pop.	±%
2002	4,515	—
2011	4,242	−6.0%
2021	2,999	−29.3%
Source: Census data
