= Bisoca =

- Commune
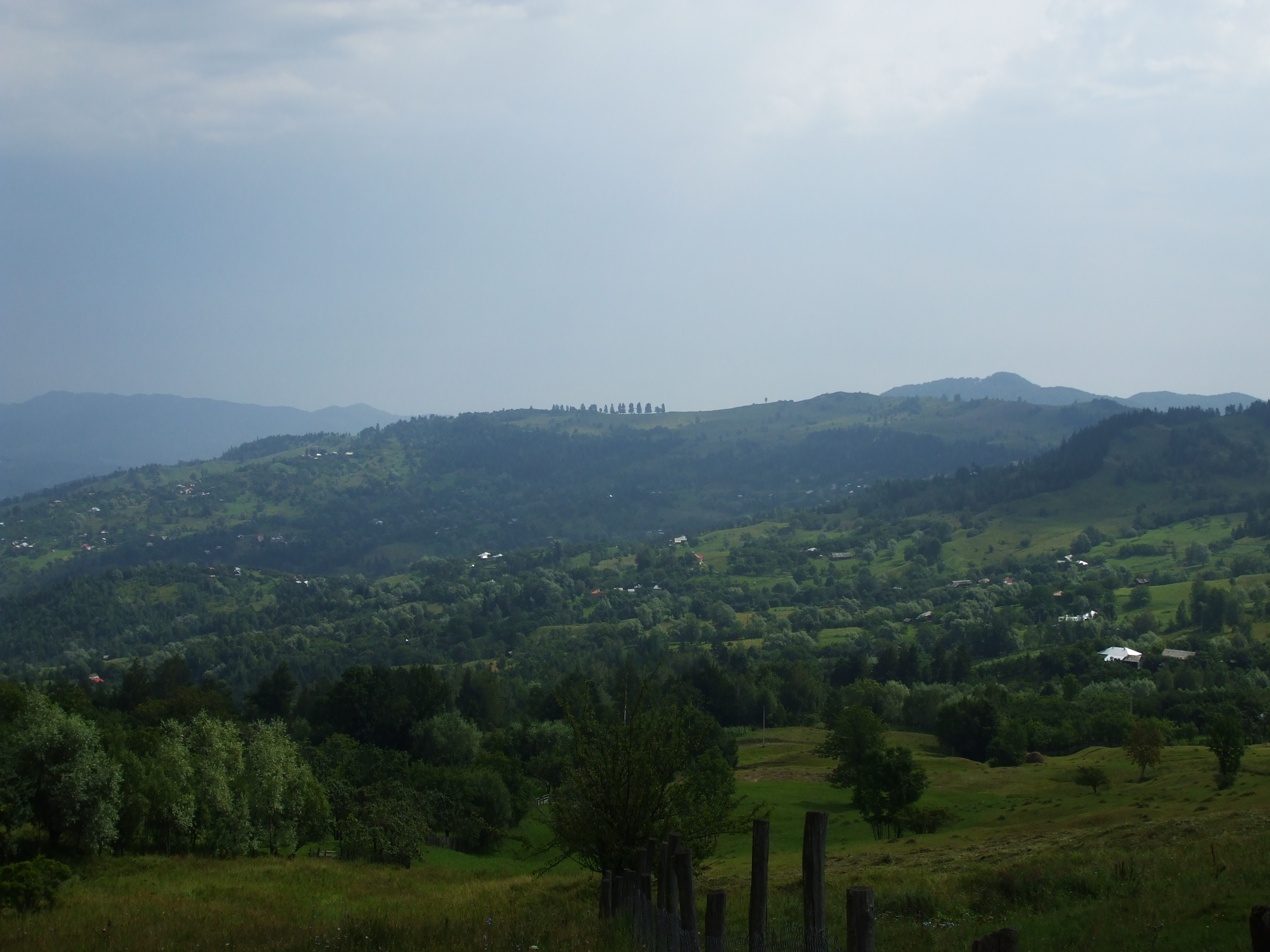
- View of Bisoca

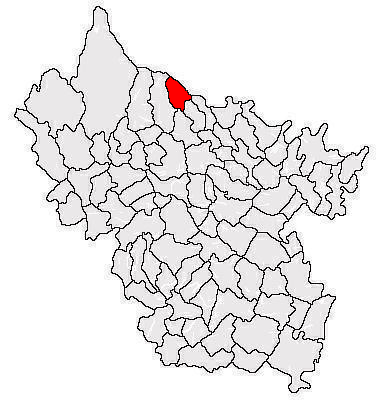
- Location in Buzău County

- Location in Romania
- Coordinates: 45°30′N 26°42′E
- Country: Romania
- County: Buzău
- Subdivisions: Băltăgari, Bisoca, Lacurile, Lopătăreasa, Pleși, Recea, Sările, Șindrila

Government
  - Mayor (2020–2024): Florin Stemate (PSD)
- Area: 72.68 km^{2} (28.06 sq mi)
- Elevation: 810 m (2,660 ft)
- Population (2021-12-01): 2,175
  - Density: 29.93/km^{2} (77.51/sq mi)
- Time zone: UTC+02:00 (EET)
  - Summer (DST): UTC+03:00 (EEST)
- Postal code: 127055
- Area code: +(40) 238
- Vehicle reg.: BZ
- Website: www.primariabisoca.ro

Bisoca is a commune in the north of Buzău County, Muntenia, Romania. It is composed of eight villages: Băltăgari, Bisoca, Lacurile, Lopătăreasa, Pleși, Recea, Sările, and Șindrila.

The commune is traversed on the northern side by the river Râmnicul Sărat, which has its source in nearby Jitia, Vrancea County.

== Climate ==
Bisoca has a warm-summer humid continental climate (Dfb) according to the Köppen climate classification, characterized by relatively mild winters, frequent strong winds, and significant seasonal variation in temperature and precipitation. Meteorological observations have been conducted continuously since the establishment of the Bisoca Weather Station on 1 November 1983. The station is located on Dealul Bisocii (Bisoca Hill), at an elevation of 833 metres above sea level.

The lowest temperature recorded at the station was −22.6 °C on 30 January 2006, while the highest temperature reached 35 °C on 25 August 2012. The wettest day on record occurred on 23 September 1996, when 78.4 mm of precipitation was measured within a 24-hour period.

An exceptional weather event was recorded on 5 May 1999, when temperatures dropped to −2 °C. Snowfall, including both snow pellets and snow showers, accumulated to a depth of 12–15 cm, temporarily covering the spring vegetation.

Snowfall is common during winter, although snow cover is often shallow and subject to drifting due to strong winds. The average annual number of days with snowfall is approximately 73 (dropping down to 30 using 2014-2026 data), while the average snow depth during the last decade has been about 7 cm.

Fog is relatively uncommon in Bisoca, occurring on average only 23 days per year. In contrast, strong winds are a dominant climatic feature. The area experiences a high number of days with strong wind conditions, defined as an average wind speed of at least 15.5 m/s. The strongest wind gust recorded at the station reached 40.6 m/s (146.2 km/h). This storm caused significant damage to the nearby Black Pine Reserve at Lacurile, where approximately 3 hectares of forest were blown down.

Rare atmospheric phenomena have also been observed in the area. On 17 November 1989, at 21:10 local time, an aurora borealis was reported in the northern sky under clear weather conditions.

Due to its location between the Subcarpathian hills of the Curvature Carpathians, the Buzău Mountains to the northwest, and the Vrancea Mountains to the north, Bisoca experiences climatic influences typical of the hilly and mountainous regions of eastern Romania.

Climate data for Bisoca (altitude 833m, 2014–2026 normals, extremes 1983–present)
Month	Jan	Feb	Mar	Apr	May	Jun	Jul	Aug	Sep	Oct	Nov	Dec	Year
Record high °C (°F)	19.1 (66.4)	19.8 (67.6)	23.0 (73.4)	25.2 (77.4)	27.8 (82.0)	30.1 (86.2)	33.0 (91.4)	35.0 (95.0)	29.4 (84.9)	28.0 (82.4)	23.7 (74.7)	19.0 (66.2)	35.0 (95.0)
Mean daily maximum °C (°F)	2.7 (36.9)	3.9 (39.0)	7.5 (45.5)	12.3 (54.1)	16.5 (61.7)	21.3 (70.3)	23.7 (74.7)	24.0 (75.2)	19.1 (66.4)	13.2 (55.8)	8.0 (46.4)	4.6 (40.3)	13.1 (55.5)
Daily mean °C (°F)	−0.3 (31.5)	0.8 (33.4)	4.1 (39.4)	8.5 (47.3)	12.9 (55.2)	17.6 (63.7)	19.7 (67.5)	20.0 (68.0)	15.6 (60.1)	10.0 (50.0)	5.1 (41.2)	1.8 (35.2)	9.6 (49.4)
Mean daily minimum °C (°F)	−3.3 (26.1)	−2.4 (27.7)	0.6 (33.1)	4.7 (40.5)	9.2 (48.6)	13.8 (56.8)	15.8 (60.4)	16.0 (60.8)	12.0 (53.6)	6.8 (44.2)	2.2 (36.0)	−1.0 (30.2)	6.2 (43.2)
Record low °C (°F)	−22.6 (−8.7)	−19.9 (−3.8)	−21.8 (−7.2)	−6.8 (19.8)	−2.4 (27.7)	3.5 (38.3)	5.1 (41.2)	6.2 (43.2)	1.8 (35.2)	−5.4 (22.3)	−12.6 (9.3)	−19.0 (−2.2)	−22.6 (−8.7)
Average precipitation mm (inches)	32.4 (1.28)	23.2 (0.91)	34.3 (1.35)	48.0 (1.89)	80.0 (3.15)	118.7 (4.67)	87.3 (3.44)	64.8 (2.55)	45.4 (1.79)	54.6 (2.15)	45.2 (1.78)	42.0 (1.65)	675.9 (26.61)
Average precipitation days (≥ 1.0 mm)	5.2	4.2	5.8	6.5	10.5	10.8	8.9	6.4	5.3	6.2	6.8	6.5	83.1
Average snowy days	6.8	6.8	4.8	2.4	0	0	0	0	0	0.2	2.8	6.3	30.1
Source: Meteomanz (2014-2026); Infoclimat (1980-2010); ANM

Historical population
Year	Pop.	±%
2002	2,962	—
2011	2,791	−5.8%
2021	2,175	−22.1%
Source: Census data
