= Beceni =

- Commune
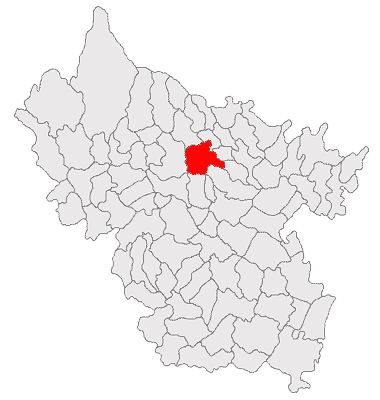
- Location in Buzău County

- Location in Romania
- Coordinates: 45°23′N 26°47′E
- Country: Romania
- County: Buzău
- Subdivisions: Arbănași, Beceni, Cărpiniștea, Dimiana, Dogari, Florești, Izvoru Dulce, Mărgăriți, Valea Părului

Government
  - Mayor (2020–2024): Adrian Burlacu (PNL)
- Area: 76.65 km^{2} (29.59 sq mi)
- Elevation: 233 m (764 ft)
- Population (2021-12-01): 3,630
  - Density: 47/km^{2} (120/sq mi)
- Time zone: EET/EEST (UTC+2/+3)
- Postal code: 127025
- Area code: +(40) 238
- Vehicle reg.: BZ
- Website: www.primariabeceni.ro

Beceni is a commune in Buzău County, Muntenia, Romania. It is composed of nine villages: Arbănași, Beceni, Cărpiniștea, Dogari, Florești, Gura Dimienii, Izvoru Dulce, Mărgăriți, and Valea Părului.

Historical population
Year	Pop.	±%
2002	5,034	—
2011	4,403	−12.5%
2021	3,630	−17.6%
Source: Census data

== Natives ==
- Constantin Constantinescu-Claps (1884–1961), general during World War II
