= List of rivers of Romania: G–H =

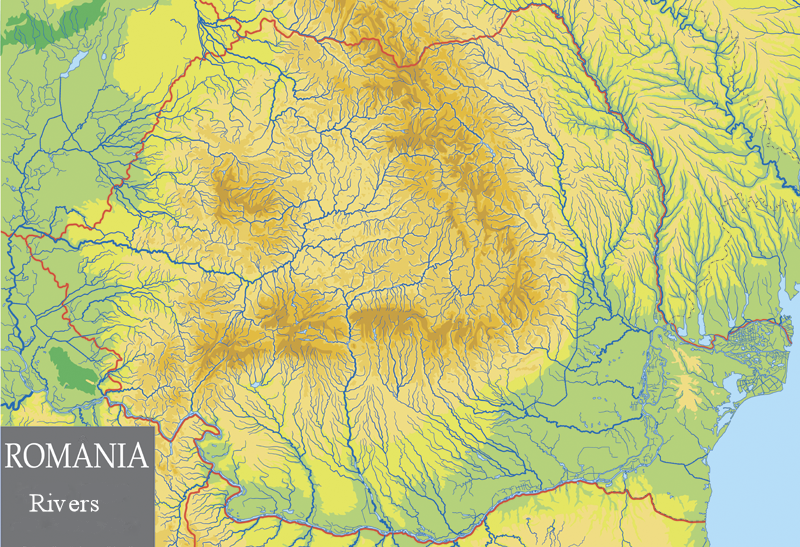
Map of Romania's hydrographic network

== G ==
River	Tributary of
Gădălin	Someșul Mic
Găiceana	Berheci
Gălăoaia	Mureș
Galațca	Bega
Gălăuțaș	Mureș
Gâlcești	Amaradia
Galda	Mureș
Găldița	Galda
Gârbău	Durbav
Gârbău	Secaș
Gârbău	Someșul Mic
Gârbăul Dejului	Someșul Mare
Gârbova	Mureș
Gârbova	Secaș
Gârboveta	Bârlad
Gârceneanca	Racova
Gârcin	Tărlung
Gârda Seacă	Arieșul Mare
Gârla Boul Bătrân	Prut
Gârla Ciulineț	Danube
Gârliște	Caraș
Gârlița Satului	Dâmbovița

River	Tributary of
Găujani	Boia Mare
Găureni	Țibleș
Geamăna	Olt
Geamărtălui	Olteț
Gelug	Caraș
Gemenea	Suha
Gengea	Bârlui
Geoagel	Geoagiu
Geoagiu	Mureș (in Alba County)
Geoagiu	Mureș (in Hunedoara County)
Gepiș	Crișul Repede
Gepiu	Corhana
Gersa	Someșul Mare
Geru	Siret
Ghegheș	Târnava Mică
Ghelința	Râul Negru
Gherteamoș	Bega
Ghighiu	Sărata
Ghighiu	Teleajen
Ghimbășel	Bârsa
Ghimbav	Dâmbovița

River	Tributary of
Ghipeș	Homorodul Mare
Ghireni	Prut
Ghiurca Mare	Bâsca
Ghizghiț	Arieșul Mare
Gilort	Jiu
Gilorțel	Gilort
Gioroc	Jiu
Giucoșin	Aranca
Giula	Borșa
Giurgiu	Bâsca Mică
Gladna	Bega
Glâmboca	Bistra
Glâmbocel	Budișteanca
Glavacioc	Câlniștea
Glăvănești	Jijia
Glaveș	Sărata
Glavița	Bega
Gligan	Dâmbovnic
Globu	Mehadica
Goagiu	Târnava Mare
Godinești	Berheci
Goleț	Timiș
Gologan	Geru

River	Tributary of
Gorgan	Cozd
Gota	Dârjov
Govăjdia	Cerna
Govora	Olt
Greabăn	Râmnicul Sărat
Greci	Danube
Grind	Unirea
Groapa	Barcău
Gropoi	Teuz
Gropșoarele	Teleajen
Groșeni	Teuz
Groșerea	Gilort
Grosul	Mureș
Gudea Mare	Mureș
Gura Dobrogei	Casimcea
Gura Văii	Pruteț
Gurasada	Mureș
Gurban	Neajlov
Gurghiu	Mureș
Gurgui	Bistrița
Gurguiata	Bahlui
Gușoianca	Pesceana
Gut	Crișul Alb

== H ==
River	Tributary of
Habic	Mureș
Hăghig	Olt
Haita	Neagra
Hălmăgel	Bănești
Haloșul Mare	Cașin
Hamangia	Lake Golovița
Hangu	Bistrița
Hârboca	Câlnău
Hârja	Holod
Hărpășești	Bahlueț
Harțag	Buzău
Hârtibaciu	Cibin
Hășdate	Arieș
Hatnuța	Suceava

River	Tributary of
Hăuzeasca	Gladna
Herța	Prut
Hididel	Pârâul Rece
Hidișel	Holod
Hidișel	Peța
Hirișești	Gilort
Hodiș	Crișul Alb
Hodoș	Târnava Mare
Hodoșa	Niraj
Hoisești	Bahlui
Holbav	Șercaia
Holboca	Neajlov
Holod	Crișul Negru
Homocioaia	Slănic

River	Tributary of
Homorod	Homorodul Nou
Homorod	Mureș
Homorod	Olt (central Brașov County)
Homorod	Olt (northern Brașov County)
Homorodul Mare	Homorod
Homorodul Mic	Homorod
Homorodul Nou	Someș
Homorodul Vechi	Someș
Honțiș	Sighișoara
Horaiț	Suceava
Horăița	Almaș
Horezu	Bistricioara
Horezu	Geamărtălui

River	Tributary of
Horincea	Prut
Horoat	Someș
Horoghiuca	Miletin
Horoiata	Bârlad
Hosu	Fizeș
Hotari	Soloneț
Hoteag	Lotru
Huluba	Argeșel
Humăria	Stavnic
Humor	Moldova
Hurez	Ciolt
Hușnicioara	Hușnița
Hușnița	Motru
