= Turbați =

- Location within Romania

Location
- Country: Romania
- Counties: Gorj County
- Villages: Crasna, Dumbrăveni, Buzești, Magherești

Physical characteristics
- Mouth: Blahnița
  - coordinates: 45.0693°N 23.5404°E
- Length: 20 km (12 mi)
- Basin size: 52 km^{2} (20 sq mi)

Basin features
- Progression: Blahnița→ Gilort→ Jiu→ Danube→ Black Sea
- Tributaries
  - right: Valea Drăgoieștilor, Larga
- River code: VII.1.34.9.1

The Turbați is a right tributary of the river Blahnița in Romania. It flows into the Blahnița in Hăiești. Its length is 20 km (12 mi) and its basin size is 52 km^{2} (20 sq mi).
