= Aniniș =

- Location within Romania

Location
- Country: Romania
- Counties: Gorj County
- Villages: Aninișu din Vale

Physical characteristics
- Mouth: Ciocadia
  - coordinates: 45.1240°N 23.6112°E
- Length: 16 km (9.9 mi)
- Basin size: 44 km^{2} (17 sq mi)

Basin features
- Progression: Ciocadia→ Gilort→ Jiu→ Danube→ Black Sea
- Tributaries
  - right: Ciocazeaua Radoșului
- River code: VII.1.34.6.2

The Aniniș is a left tributary of the river Ciocadia in Romania. It flows into the Ciocadia in the village Ciocadia. Its length is 16 km (9.9 mi) and its basin size is 44 km^{2} (17 sq mi).
