= Purcari (river) =

- Location within Romania

Location
- Country: Romania
- Counties: Gorj County
- Villages: Purcaru, Săulești

Physical characteristics
- Mouth: Gilort
  - coordinates: 44.7958°N 23.5158°E
- Length: 13 km (8.1 mi)
- Basin size: 35 km^{2} (14 sq mi)

Basin features
- Progression: Gilort→ Jiu→ Danube→ Black Sea
- River code: VII.1.34.10

The Purcari is a right tributary of the river Gilort in Romania. It flows into the Gilort near Vladimir. Its length is 13 km (8.1 mi) and its basin size is 35 km^{2} (14 sq mi).
