= Ciocadia =

Ciocadia Cărpiniș
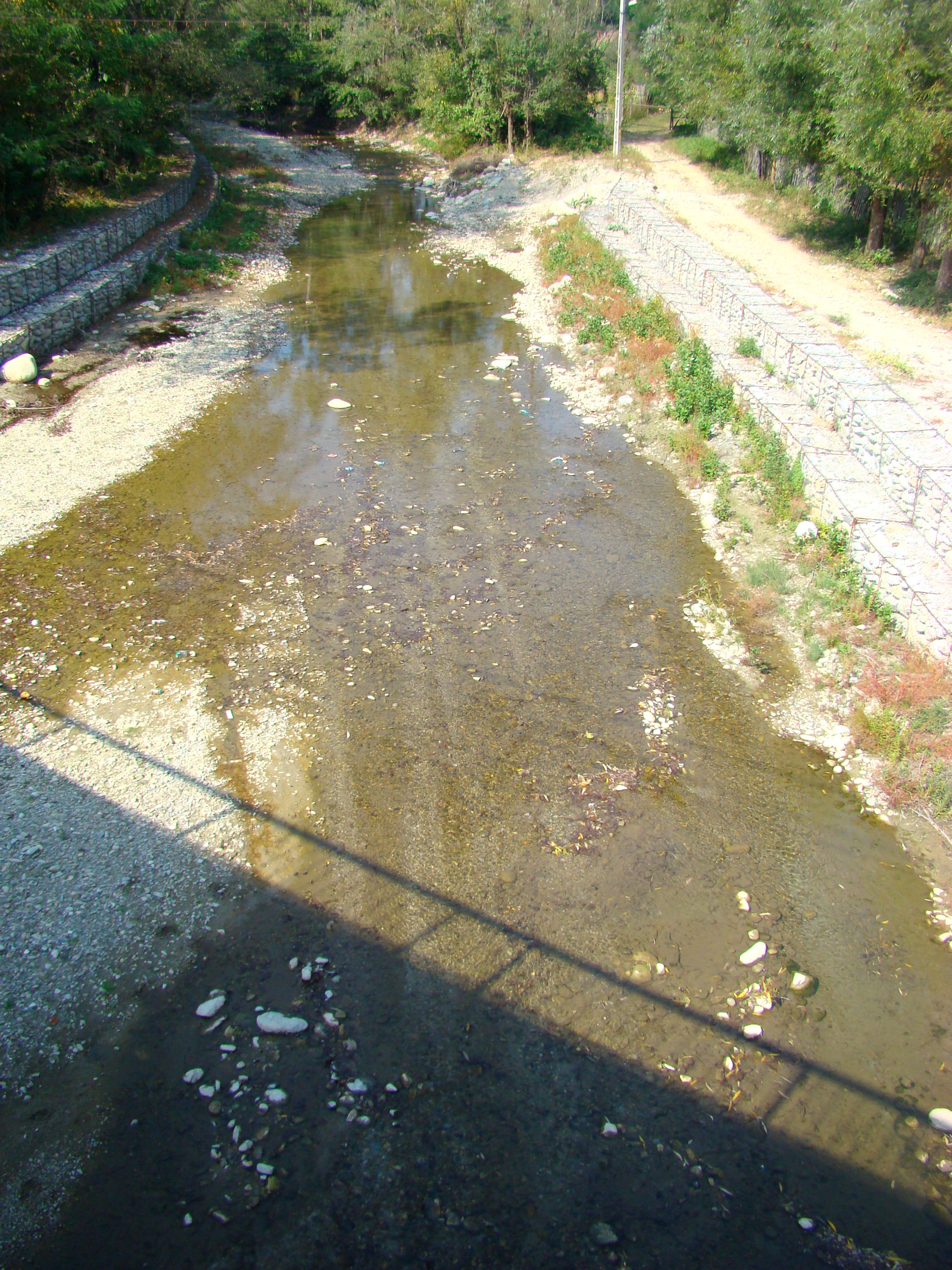

- Location within Romania

Location
- Country: Romania
- Counties: Gorj County
- Villages: Cărpiniș, Ciocadia

Physical characteristics
- Mouth: Gilort
  - coordinates: 45.0586°N 23.5859°E
- Length: 28 km (17 mi)
- Basin size: 116 km^{2} (45 sq mi)

Basin features
- Progression: Gilort→ Jiu→ Danube→ Black Sea
- Tributaries
  - left: Aniniș
  - right: Țiganu, Capra, Ghia

The Ciocadia is a right tributary of the river Gilort in Romania. It discharges into the Gilort in Bengești. The upper reach of the river is also known as Cărpiniș. Its length is 28 km (17 mi) and its basin size is 116 km^{2} (45 sq mi).
