= Cocorova =

Cocorova may refer to several places in Romania:

- Cocorova, a village in Turburea Commune, Gorj County
- Cocorova, a village in Șișești Commune, Mehedinți County
- Cocorova (river), a tributary of the Gilort in Gorj County
