= Groșerea =

- Location within Romania

Location
- Country: Romania
- Counties: Gorj County
- Villages: Piscuri, Groșerea

Physical characteristics
- Mouth: Gilort
  - coordinates: 44.7157°N 23.4980°E
- Length: 17 km (11 mi)
- Basin size: 58 km^{2} (22 sq mi)

Basin features
- Progression: Gilort→ Jiu→ Danube→ Black Sea

The Groșerea is a right tributary of the river Gilort in Romania. It discharges into the Gilort in the village Groșerea. Its length is 17 km (11 mi) and its basin size is 58 km^{2} (22 sq mi).
