= Sterpoaia =

- Location within Romania

Location
- Country: Romania
- Counties: Gorj
- Villages: Sterpoaia, Aninoasa

Physical characteristics
- Mouth: Gilort
  - coordinates: 44.7374°N 23.5076°E
- Length: 19 km (12 mi)
- Basin size: 50 km^{2} (19 sq mi)

Basin features
- Progression: Gilort→ Jiu→ Danube→ Black Sea

The Sterpoaia is a right tributary of the river Gilort in Romania. It discharges into the Gilort in Aninoasa. Its length is 19 km (12 mi) and its basin size is 50 km^{2} (19 sq mi).
