= Romanul =

- Location within Romania

Location
- Country: Romania
- Counties: Gorj County

Physical characteristics
- Source: Parâng Mountains
- Mouth: Gilort
  - coordinates: 45.2752°N 23.6415°E
- Length: 9 km (5.6 mi)
- Basin size: 26 km^{2} (10 sq mi)

Basin features
- Progression: Gilort→ Jiu→ Danube→ Black Sea
- Tributaries
  - left: Mohoru, Păpușa
  - right: Mohoru cu Apă, Mioarele
- River code: VII.1.34.2

The Romanul is a left tributary of the river Gilort in Romania. Its source is in the Parâng Mountains. It flows into the Gilort north of Novaci. Its length is 9 km (5.6 mi) and its basin size is 26 km^{2} (10 sq mi).
