= Blahnița =

Blahnița may refer to several places in Romania:

- Blahnița de Jos, a village in Târgu Cărbunești town, Gorj County
- Blahnița de Sus, a village in Săcelu Commune, Gorj County
- Blahnița (Danube), a river in Mehedinți County
- Blahnița (Gilort), a river in Gorj County
- Blahnița, a protected area in Gorj County
