= Cocorova (river) =

- Location within Romania

Location
- Country: Romania
- Counties: Gorj County
- Villages: Bulbuceni, Cocorova

Physical characteristics
- Mouth: Gilort
  - coordinates: 44.6618°N 23.5111°E
- Length: 14 km (8.7 mi)
- Basin size: 27 km^{2} (10 sq mi)

Basin features
- Progression: Gilort→ Jiu→ Danube→ Black Sea

The Cocorova is a left tributary of the river Gilort in Romania. It discharges into the Gilort in Poiana. Its length is 14 km (8.7 mi) and its basin size is 27 km^{2} (10 sq mi).
