= Bobaia =

Bobaia may refer to several villages in Romania:

- Bobaia, a village in Aninoasa, Gorj
- Bobaia, a village in Boșorod Commune, Hunedoara County
- Bobaia River, a tributary of the Luncani River in Romania
- Bobaia oil field, an oil field located in Aninoasa, Gorj County
