= Negoiești =

Negoieşti may refer to several villages in Romania:

- Negoieşti, a village in Ştefan cel Mare Commune, Bacău County
- Negoieşti, a village in Melinești Commune, Dolj County
- Negoieşti, a village in Prigoria Commune, Gorj County
- Negoieşti, a village in Brazi Commune, Prahova County

== See also ==
- Negoeşti (disambiguation)
