= Pârâu =

Pârâu or Pârâul may refer to several places in Romania:

- Pârâu, a village in Brăneşti Commune, Gorj County
- Pârâu Boghii, a village in Pârgărești Commune, Bacău County
- Pârâu Boia, a village in Jupânești Commune, Gorj County
- Pârâu-Cărbunări, a village in Lupșa Commune, Alba County
- Pârâu Crucii, a village in Pogăceaua Commune, Mureș County
- Pârâu Crucii, a village in Râciu Commune, Mureș County
- Pârâu Mare, a village in Ibăneşti Commune, Mureș County
- Pârâu Negrei, a village in Breaza Commune, Suceava County
- Pârâu Negru, a village in Mihăileni, Botoșani Commune, Botoşani County
- Pârâu Viu, a village in Berlești Commune, Gorj County
- Pârâu de Pripor and Pârâu de Vale, villages in Godinești Commune, Gorj County
- Pârâul Rece, a village in Predeal Town, Braşov County
- Pârâul Cârjei and Pârâul Pântei, villages in Borca Commune, Neamţ County
- Pârâul Fagului, a village in Poiana Teiului Commune, Neamţ County
- Pârâul Mare, a village in Ceahlău Commune, Neamţ County
- Pârâu (Valea Nouă), a river in Bihor County
