= Sârbești =

Sârbeşti may refer to several villages in Romania:

- Sârbeşti, a village in Lunca Commune, Bihor County
- Sârbeşti, a village in Vintilă Vodă Commune, Buzău County
- Sârbeşti, a village in Alimpești Commune, Gorj County
