= Câlnic (Gilort) =

- Location within Romania

Location
- Country: Romania
- Counties: Gorj County
- Villages: Prigoria, Călugăreasa

Physical characteristics
- Mouth: Gilort
  - coordinates: 45.0113°N 23.5905°E
- Length: 25 km (16 mi)
- Basin size: 104 km^{2} (40 sq mi)

Basin features
- Progression: Gilort→ Jiu→ Danube→ Black Sea
- Tributaries
  - left: Călugăreasa, Giovria
  - right: Valea Călugărească

The Câlnic is a left tributary of the river Gilort in Romania. It discharges into the Gilort in Albeni. Its length is 25 km (16 mi) and its basin size is 104 km^{2} (40 sq mi).
