= Sărdănești Power Station =

Electricity producer in Romania

Sărdăneşti Power Plant
- Country: Romania
- Location: Gorj County
- Status: Approved
- Owner: Energy Holding

Thermal power station
- Primary fuel: Sub-bituminous coal

Power generation
- Units operational: 4
- Nameplate capacity: 700 MW

The Sărdăneşti Power Station will be one of the largest electricity producers in Romania, having 4 groups of 175 MW each totalling an installed capacity of 700 MW and an electricity generation capacity of around 5.3 TW/year.

The power plant will be situated in Gorj County (South-Western Romania) on the banks of the Jiu River in Sărdăneşti. The construction of the power plant will begin in 2009 and it will be finished in 2013 at a total cost of $1.3 billion.

== See also ==
- List of power stations in Romania
