= Capu Dealului =

Capu Dealului may refer to several villages in Romania:

- Capu Dealului, a village in Cenade Commune, Alba County
- Capu Dealului, a village in Brănești, Gorj
- Capu Dealului, a village in the town of Băbeni, Vâlcea County
- Capu Dealului, a village in the town of Drăgăşani, Vâlcea County
