= Dârjov =

- Location within Romania

Location
- Country: Romania
- Counties: Olt County
- Villages: Priseaca, Valea Mare, Brebeni

Physical characteristics
- Mouth: Olt
  - coordinates: 44.3014°N 24.3884°E
- Length: 35 km (22 mi)
- Basin size: 161 km^{2} (62 sq mi)

Basin features
- Progression: Olt→ Danube→ Black Sea
- Tributaries
  - left: Gota, Turia, Chiara, Jid

The Dârjov is a left tributary of the river Olt in Romania. It discharges into the Olt in Ipotești. Its length is 35 km (22 mi) and its basin size is 161 km^{2} (62 sq mi).
