= Dacian fortress of Polovragi =

- Location within Romania
- 45.2026°N 23.7860°E
- Location: Crucea lui Ursache, Polovragi, Gorj, Romania

Site notes
- Elevation: 930 m (3,050 ft)
- Condition: Destroyed

Monument istoric
- Reference no.: GJ-I-s-B-09137

Polovragi was a Dacian fortified town.
