= Vladimiru =

Vladimiru may refer to:

- Vladimiru River
- Vladimir, Gorj
