= Bălcești (disambiguation) =

Bălcești may refer to several places in Romania:

- Bălcești, a town in Vâlcea County
- Bălcești, a village in Beliș Commune, Cluj County
- Bălcești, a village in Căpușu Mare Commune, Cluj County
- Bălcești, a village in Bengești-Ciocadia Commune, Gorj County
- Bălcești, a former commune, now part of Nicolae Bălcescu Commune, Vâlcea County
