= Gilorțel =

Gilorțel Gilorțelul Mare
- Location within Romania

Location
- Country: Romania
- Counties: Gorj

Physical characteristics
- Source: Parâng Mountains
- Mouth: Gilort
  - coordinates: 45.1767°N 23.6693°E
- Length: 10 km (6.2 mi)
- Basin size: 12 km^{2} (4.6 sq mi)

Basin features
- Progression: Gilort→ Jiu→ Danube→ Black Sea
- Tributaries
  - right: Gilorțelul Mic
- River code: VII.1.34.3

The Gilorțel (also: Gilorțelul Mare) is a left tributary of the river Gilort in Romania. It flows into the Gilort in Novaci. Its length is 10 km (6.2 mi) and its basin size is 12 km^{2} (4.6 sq mi).
