= Râul Lupului =

Râul Lupului may refer to:

- Lupul, a tributary of the Bahlui in Iași County
- Valea Lupului, a tributary of the Homorod in Satu Mare County
