= Vladimir (disambiguation) =

Vladimir, Volodimir, or Volodimer' (Old East Slavic: Володимѣръ, romanized: Volodiměrŭ) is a masculine given name. It may also refer to:

== Places ==
- Vladimir, Ulcinj, a village in Ulcinj Municipality, Montenegro
- Vladimir, Gorj, a commune in Gorj County, Romania
- Vladimir, a village in Goiești Commune, Dolj County, Romania
- Vladimir (river), a tributary of the Gilort in Gorj County, Romania
- Vladimir, Russia, a city in Russia, historically spelt Volodimer' or Volodimir, and sometimes Vladimir on the Klyazma, Vladimir-Suzdal or Vladimir in Suzdalia to distinguish it from Volodymyr, Volyn Oblast (1944–2021: Volodymyr-Volynskyi)
  - Vladimir Oblast, a federal subject of Russia centred on the above city
- Volodymyr, Volyn Oblast, a city in Ukraine (1944–2021: Volodymyr-Volynskyi), historically spelt Volodimer', Volodimir, or Vladimir, and sometimes Volodimer'Volodimir/Vladimir/Volodymyr in Volyn'/Volhynia to distinguish it from Vladimir, Russia
  - Volodymyr Raion, a raion in Ukraine centred on the above city

== Other uses ==
- Jovan Vladimir (died 1016), ruler of Doclea and a saint of the Serbian Orthodox Church
- Vladimir (TV series), 2026 American comedy drama

== See also ==
- Vladimir-Suzdal, a medieval principality
- Vlademir (born 1979), Brazilian footballer
- Uladzimir, Belarusian equivalent
- Volodymyr, Ukrainian equivalent
- Włodzimierz (given name), Polish equivalent
