= Bobaia oil field =

Oil field in Gorj County, Romania

Bobaia
- Country: Romania
- Region: Gorj County
- Offshore/onshore: onshore
- Operator: Petrom

Field history
- Discovery: 1984
- Start of production: 1985

Production
- Current production of oil: 3,000 barrels per day (~1.5×10^{5} t/a)
- Estimated oil in place: 69 million tonnes (~ 81.7×10^{6} m^{3} or 514 million bbl)

The Bobaia oil field is an oil field located in Aninoasa, Gorj County. It was discovered in 1984 and developed by Petrom. It began production in 1985 and produces oil. The total proven reserves of the Bobaia oil field are around 514 million barrels (69 million tonnes), and production is centered on 3,000 barrels per day (480 m^{3}/d).
