= Vladimir II =

Vladimir II may refer to:

- Vladimir II, Prince of Novgorod (1020–1052)
- Vladimir II Monomakh (1053–1125)
- Vladimir II of Duklja, Prince of Duklja, from 1103 to 1113
- Vladimir II, Prince of Pereyaslavl (r. 1170–1187)
- Vladimir II Yaroslavich (?–1198/1199)

== See also ==
- Vladimir (disambiguation)
