= Sărdănești =

Sărdănești may refer to several villages in Romania:

- Sărdănești, a village in Plopșoru Commune, Gorj County
- Sărdănești, a village in Bala Commune, Mehedinți County
