= Vladimir (river) =

- Location within Romania

Location
- Country: Romania
- Counties: Gorj County
- Villages: Vladimir

Physical characteristics
- Mouth: Gilort
  - location: Andreești
  - coordinates: 44.7790°N 23.5160°E
- Length: 19 km (12 mi)
- Basin size: 46 km^{2} (18 sq mi)

Basin features
- Progression: Gilort→ Jiu→ Danube→ Black Sea
- River code: VII.1.34.11

The Vladimir is a left tributary of the river Gilort in Romania. It flows into the Gilort in Andreești. Its length is 19 km (12 mi) and its basin size is 46 km^{2} (18 sq mi).
