= Bircii =

Bircii may refer to several places in Romania:

- Bircii, a village in Bengești-Ciocadia Commune, Gorj County
- Bircii, a village in Scorniceşti Town, Olt County
