= Hirișești =

- Location within Romania

Location
- Country: Romania
- Counties: Gorj County
- Villages: Hirișești

Physical characteristics
- Mouth: Gilort
  - coordinates: 45.1436°N 23.6365°E
- Length: 11 km (6.8 mi)
- Basin size: 18 km^{2} (6.9 sq mi)

Basin features
- Progression: Gilort→ Jiu→ Danube→ Black Sea
- River code: VII.1.34.4

The Hirișești is a right tributary of the river Gilort in Romania. It flows into the Gilort in Pociovaliștea. Its length is 11 km (6.8 mi) and its basin size is 18 km^{2} (6.9 sq mi).
