= Ilie Văduva =

Romanian politician

Minister of Foreign Affairs of Romania
- In office November 11, 1985 – August 26, 1986
- President: Nicolae Ceaușescu
- Preceded by: Ștefan Andrei
- Succeeded by: Ioan Totu

Minister of Foreign Trade and International Cooperation
- In office August 26, 1986 – May 21, 1988
- President: Nicolae Ceaușescu

Presidential Counselor
- In office December 1988 – December 22, 1989
- President: Nicolae Ceaușescu

Personal details
- Born: July 21, 1934 Aninoasa, Gorj County, Kingdom of Romania
- Died: November 13, 1998 (aged 64) Bucharest, Romania
- Party: Romanian Communist Party
- Spouse: Elza Văduva
- Education: Bucharest Academy of Economic Studies
- Occupation: Economist, politician

Ilie Văduva (Romanian pronunciation: [iˈli.e ˈvəduva]; July 21, 1934 – November 13, 1998) was a Romanian communist politician who served as the Minister of Foreign Affairs of Romania from 1985 until 1986, Minister of Foreign Trade and International Cooperation from August 26, 1986, until May 1988 and Presidential Counselor from December 1988 until December 1989. He was one of those arrested after the 1989 overthrow of the Nicolae Ceaușescu regime.

== Life and political career ==
Văduva was born in 1934 Aninoasa, Gorj County. After completing high school in Târgu Jiu in 1954, he attended the Academy of Economic Studies in Bucharest, graduating in 1958. He joined the Romanian Communist Party (PCR) in 1961. He was an alternate member of the Central Committee of the PCR since 1979 and became a full member in 1984. From 1968 to 1970 he pursued his studies in Switzerland, and in 1971 he obtained his Ph.D. in Economics. From January 1980 to November 1985, he served as Rector of the Academy of Economic Studies.

Văduva, who advised on economic issues and had no knowledge of international relations, was regarded as the protégé of the First Lady of Romania, Elena Ceaușescu. In 1985, Elena Ceaușescu selected him for the post of Minister of Foreign Affairs, replacing a more experienced and successful minister, Ștefan Andrei, previously appointed by Romanian leader and Elena's husband Nicolae Ceaușescu. Văduva served as the Minister of Foreign Affairs from November 11, 1985, until August 26, 1986, mainly promoting Elena Ceaușescu's international profile. While a minister, he was also caught in the midst of heated Romania–United States relations with increasing pressure from the United States on the Ceaușescu regime for abuse of human rights. He was removed for his ineffectiveness in international affairs of Romania and appointed Minister of Foreign Trade and International Cooperation in 1986. He held this post until May 21, 1988, when he was sacked by the Romanian leadership for his role in storing toxic waste in the Black Sea port of Sulina, causing an environmental scandal and outrage. However, a few months later, in December 1988, he was again given a high-ranking position serving as the Presidential Counselor.

== See also ==
- Romanian Communist Party
- Nicolae Ceaușescu
- Foreign relations of Romania
