= Blahnița (Gilort) =

Tributary of the river Gilort in Romania

- Location within Romania

Location
- Country: Romania
- Counties: Gorj County
- Villages: Blahnița de Sus, Săcelu, Mogoșani, Târgu Cărbunești

Physical characteristics
- Mouth: Gilort
  - location: Târgu Cărbunești
  - coordinates: 44.9474°N 23.5052°E
- Length: 53 km (33 mi)
- Basin size: 220 km^{2} (85 sq mi)

Basin features
- Progression: Gilort→ Jiu→ Danube→ Black Sea
- Tributaries
  - right: Turbați, Bobu, Tărățel

The Blahnița is a right tributary of the river Gilort in Romania. It discharges into the Gilort in Târgu Cărbunești. Its length is 53 km (33 mi) and its basin size is 220 km^{2} (85 sq mi).
