= Boia =

Boia may refer to:

- Boia, a village in Jupânești municipality, Romania
- Boia (Laconia), a town in ancient Laconia, Greece
- Lucian Boia, Romanian historian
