= Bărbătești =

Bărbătești may refer to several places in Romania:

- Bărbătești, Gorj, a commune in Gorj County
- Bărbătești, Vâlcea, a commune in Vâlcea County
- Bărbătești, a village in Cocu Commune, Argeș County
- Bărbătești, a village in Cucuteni Commune, Iași County
