= Valea Iepei River =

Valea Iepei River may refer to:

- Valea Iepei, a tributary of the Gilort in Dolj and Gorj Counties, Romania
- Valea Iepei, a tributary of the Tisza in Maramureș County, Romania
