= Negoești =

Negoești may refer to several villages in Romania:

- Negoești, a village in Șoldanu Commune, Călărași County
- Negoești, a village in the town of Baia de Aramă, Mehedinți County

== See also ==
- Negoiești (disambiguation)
