= Homorod (Someș) =

- Location within Romania

Location
- Country: Romania
- Counties: Satu Mare County
- Communes: Solduba, Homorodu de Mijloc, Necopoi

Physical characteristics
- Mouth: Homorodul Nou
  - location: Hrip
  - coordinates: 47.7062°N 22.9912°E
- Length: 23 km (14 mi)
- Basin size: 152 km^{2} (59 sq mi)

Basin features
- Progression: Homorodul Nou→ Someș→ Tisza→ Danube→ Black Sea
- Tributaries
  - left: Medișa
  - right: Valea Lupului

The Homorod is a right tributary of the river Homorodul Nou in Romania. It discharges into the Homorodul Nou near Hrip. Its length is 23 km (14 mi) and its basin size is 152 km^{2} (59 sq mi).
