= Gilort =

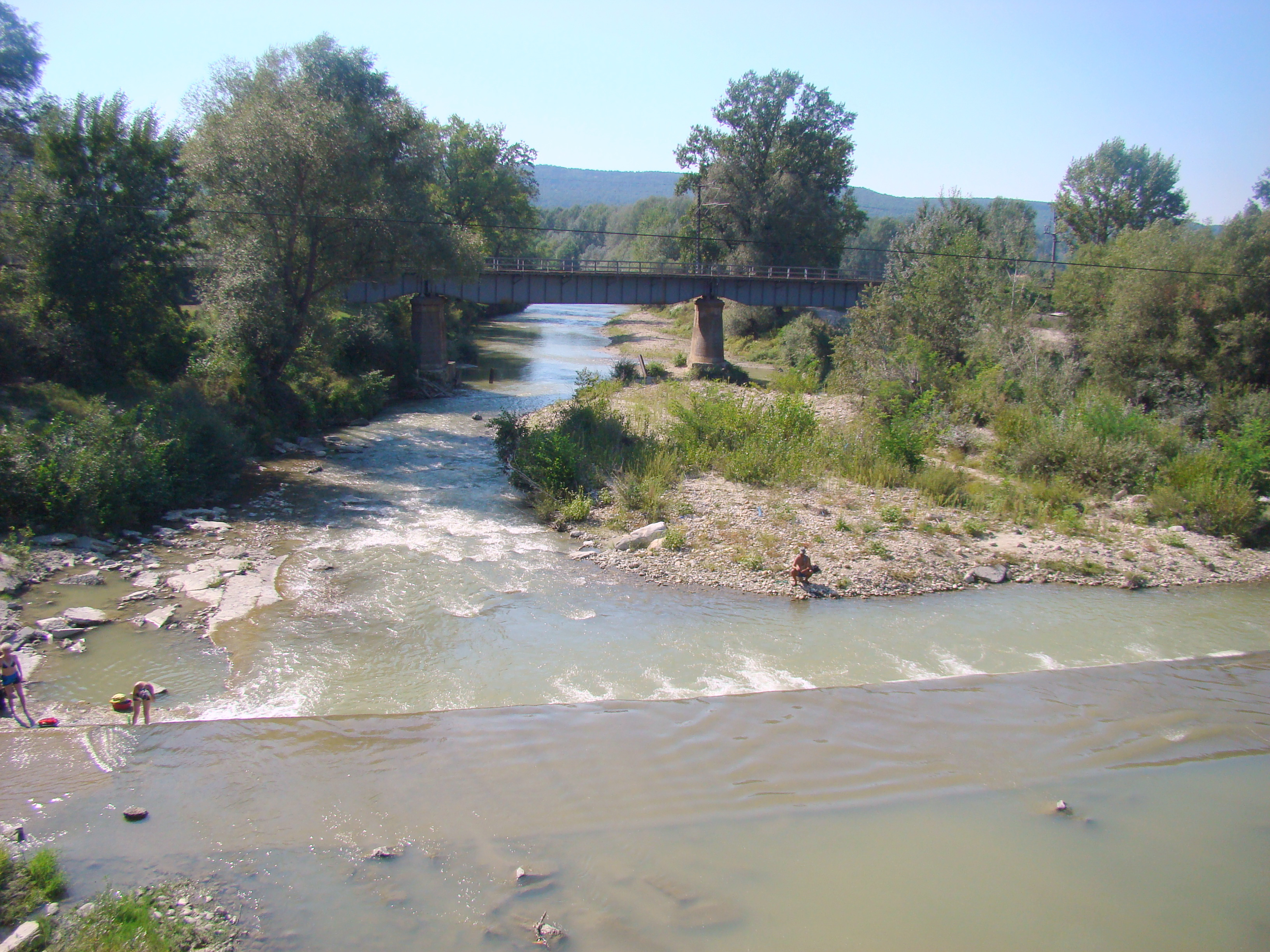

- Location within Romania

Location
- Country: Romania
- Counties: Gorj County
- Towns: Târgu Cărbunești

Physical characteristics
- Source: Parângu Mare
  - location: Parâng Mountains
  - elevation: 2,340 m (7,680 ft)
- Mouth: Jiu
  - location: Ionești
  - coordinates: 44°36′4″N 23°27′15″E
- Length: 116 km (72 mi)
- Basin size: 1,358 km^{2} (524 sq mi)

Basin features
- Progression: Jiu→ Danube→ Black Sea
- Tributaries
  - left: Câlnic
  - right: Ciocadia, Blahnița

The Gilort is a river in southern Romania, a left tributary of the river Jiu. The Gilort flows through the villages and towns Novaci, Bălcești, Bengești, Târgu Cărbunești, Jupânești, Turburea and Capu Dealului. Its length is 116 km (72 mi) and its basin size is 1,358 km^{2} (524 sq mi). It flows into the Jiu near Țânțăreni.

== Tributaries ==
The following rivers are tributaries to the river Gilort (from source to mouth):

Left: Setea Mică, Setea Mare, Pleșcoaia, Romanul, Dâlbanu, Rânca, Înșiratele, Cerbu, Măgura, Scărița, Gilorțel, Pârâul Galben, Câlnic, Bârzei, Ștefănești, Vladimir, Cocorova, Arpadia, Valea Iepei

Right: Tărtărău, Măcăria, Valea Novaci, Hirișești, Ciocadia, Blahnița, Socul, Purcari, Sterpoaia, Groșerea, Valea lui Câine
