= Dănciulești =

- Commune
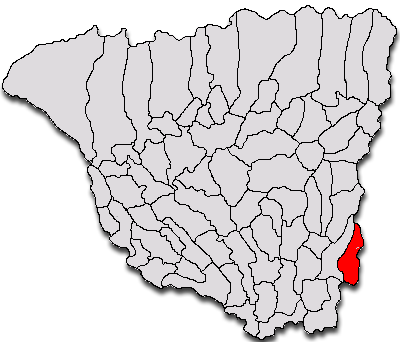
- Location in Gorj County

- Location in Romania
- Coordinates: 44°44′N 23°45′E
- Country: Romania
- County: Gorj
- Subdivisions: Bibulești, Dănciulești, Hălăngești, Obârșia, Petrăchei, Rădinești, Zăicoiu
- Population (2021-12-01): 1,997
- Time zone: EET/EEST (UTC+2/+3)
- Vehicle reg.: GJ

Dănciulești is a commune in Gorj County, Oltenia, Romania. It is composed of seven villages: Bibulești, Dănciulești, Hălăngești, Obârșia, Petrăchei, Rădinești and Zăicoiu.
