= Homorodul Nou =

- Location within Romania

Location
- Country: Romania
- Counties: Satu Mare County
- Communes: Sărătura, Ardud, Viile Satu Mare, Hrip, Ambud

Physical characteristics
- Mouth: Someș
  - location: Ambud
  - coordinates: 47.7762°N 22.9521°E
- Length: 34 km (21 mi)
- Basin size: 302 km^{2} (117 sq mi)

Basin features
- Progression: Someș→ Tisza→ Danube→ Black Sea
- Tributaries
  - left: Valea Floarei
  - right: Homorod, Homorod Balcaia

The Homorodul Nou is a left tributary of the river Someș in Romania. It discharges into the Someș in Ambud, east of the town Satu Mare. Its length is 34 km (21 mi) and its basin size is 302 km^{2} (117 sq mi).
