= Ioan Totu =

Romanian politician

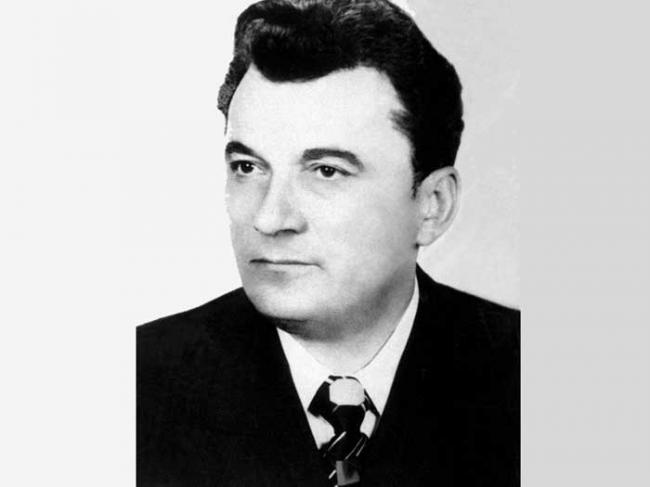

Minister of Foreign Affairs of Romania
- In office August 26, 1986 – November 2, 1989
- President: Nicolae Ceaușescu
- Preceded by: Ilie Văduva
- Succeeded by: Ion Stoian

Vice Prime Minister of Romania
- In office November 3, 1982 – March 28, 1985
- President: Nicolae Ceauşescu

President of the State Planning Committee
- In office November 4, 1989 – December 22, 1989
- President: Nicolae Ceaușescu

Personal details
- Born: May 14, 1931 Otetelișu, Vâlcea County, Kingdom of Romania
- Died: April 21, 1992 (aged 60) Bucharest, Romania
- Cause of death: Suicide by hanging
- Party: Romanian Communist Party
- Profession: Economist

Ioan Totu (Romanian pronunciation: [iˈo̯an ˈtotu]; May 14, 1931 – April 21, 1992) was a Romanian economist and communist politician who served as the Vice Prime Minister of Romania from 1982 to 1985 and as Minister of Foreign Affairs from 1986 to 1989, during the rule of Nicolae Ceaușescu. He briefly served as President of the State Planning Committee in late 1989.

== Life and political career ==
Born in Otetelișu, Vâlcea County, Totu attended the Commercial High School in Craiova from 1949 to 1950 and then studied at the Bucharest Academy of Economic Studies, which he graduated in 1953. After being an assistant at the Nicolae Bălcescu Institute for Agricultural Sciences between 1953 and 1954, he became a lecturer at the Chair of Political Sciences and Secretary of the Union of Communist Youth Committee at the Institute for Mining. He was also a propagandist for the Communist Party Committee in Sector 1 of Bucharest and was accepted as a member of the Romanian Communist Party (PCR) in 1955. In 1957 he moved to the University of Bucharest as a lecturer. After completing a course at the Ștefan Gheorghiu Academy in 1958, he became inspector of the department for teaching social sciences at the Ministry of Education and later, in 1962, instructor of the Central Committee's Department of Education, before becoming Head of the Higher Education Section of the Central Committee of the PCR in 1967.

In the Great National Assembly, Totu represented Dragalina, Călărași County from 1980 to 1985, and Dumbrăveni, Sibiu County from 1985 to 1989.

Totu was a member of the Romanian Politburo. He also served as the head of the Romanian mission to COMECON. He was generally known for his toughness, especially in his comments to the United States Department of State regarding the latter's criticism of the Romanian government for human rights abuse. As a member of Nicolae Ceaușescu's regime, he harshly criticized the U.S. Secretary of State George P. Shultz for seeking to "weaken the positions of socialism".

Totu was appointed Vice Prime Minister of Romania on November 3, 1982 and served in this post until March 28, 1985. On August 26, 1986 he was appointed Minister of Foreign Affairs of Romania replacing a less experienced diplomat Ilie Văduva. As Minister of Foreign Affairs, Totu re-established Romania's relations with Israel with the purpose to expand trade and economic relations, and to play an international role in the Middle East peace process. His term in office ended on November 2, 1989 and he was appointed the President of the State Planning Committee on November 4 which he held until December 22, 1989.

== Imprisonment and death ==
Totu was arrested on January 10, 1990, days after the Romanian Revolution of 1989. He was tried along with 24 Romanian Politburo members by the Military Court of Romania and sentenced to five and a half years in a Bucharest prison. After conviction and imprisonment, Totu committed suicide by hanging in 1992.

== See also ==
- Romanian Communist Party
- Nicolae Ceaușescu
- Foreign relations of Romania
