= Ștefan Andrei =

Romanian politician

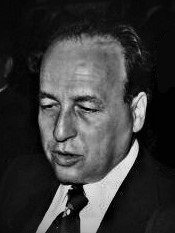
- Andrei in 1975

Minister of Foreign Affairs of Romania
- In office 8 March 1978 – 11 November 1985
- President: Nicolae Ceaușescu
- Preceded by: George Macovescu
- Succeeded by: Ilie Văduva

Personal details
- Born: 29 March 1931 Podari, Oltenia, Kingdom of Romania
- Died: 31 August 2014 (aged 83) Snagov, Romania
- Spouse: Violeta Andrei

Ștefan Andrei (Romanian pronunciation: [ʃteˈfan anˈdrej]; 29 March 1931 – 31 August 2014) was a Romanian communist politician who served as the Minister of Foreign Affairs of Romania from 1978 to 1985. He was arrested after the 1989 overthrow of the Nicolae Ceaușescu regime.

== Early life ==
Andrei was born to a very poor family in Oltenia, where the Romanian communist leader Nicolae Ceaușescu was also from. While a child he was a shepherd but, willing to continue his education, he eventually made his way into the leadership of the Central Committee of the Romanian Communist Party. His doctoral thesis at the university covered the subject of international communist movements and was later used as reference in the central committee. In one of his articles on socialism he had published a few days before an official visit by the General Secretary of the CP of China, Hu Yaobang, he said:

The socialist character of one country or another cannot be denied; the socialism built in one country cannot be opposed to the socialism of other countries or to the socialism to be constructed in the future.

Andrei was often considered a very literate and benevolent man, a famous book collector enriching his collection from his trips abroad. He was also seen as a good husband and family man. He was married to the Romanian movie actress Violeta Andrei.

== Political career ==
Andrei was first appointed Deputy Chief of the International Section of the Central Committee and encouraged to develop ties with foreign communist governments and movements around the world. Then in April 1972, he became the Secretary for Foreign Relations of the Central Committee and in November 1974, he rose to membership on the Permanent Bureau of the Political Executive Committee of Romania. On 8 March 1978 he was eventually appointed the Minister of Foreign Affairs. As a Minister, Andrei attempted to decrease dependence of Romania on Soviet Union by directing its foreign policy towards developing ASEAN countries of Indonesia, Malaysia, Singapore and Thailand while also enhancing trade, economic and educational exchange with African countries of Guinea, Gabon, Angola, Zambia, Mozambique, Burundi, Sudan, and Zaire which also diversified Romania's energy imports. During his years in service to the Ceaușescu regime, he was also a personal advisor to the younger son of Nicolae Ceaușescu, Nicu Ceaușescu. His term as the Minister of Foreign Affairs ended on 11 November 1985 when he was reportedly sacked by the First Lady Elena Ceaușescu who then appointed her protégé, Ilie Văduva to take over. Andrei was subsequently appointed the Secretary of the Central Committee in charge of economic matters.

After the Romanian Revolution of 1989, he was arrested and sentenced by a Romanian Military Court to two years and ten months in prison for supporting the bloody crackdown in 1989. He served at least part of his sentence at the Jilava Prison hospital.

Andrei died on 31 August 2014 in Snagov, Ilfov County at the age of 83.

== See also ==
- Romanian Communist Party
- Nicolae Ceaușescu
- Foreign relations of Romania
