= Polovragi =

- Commune
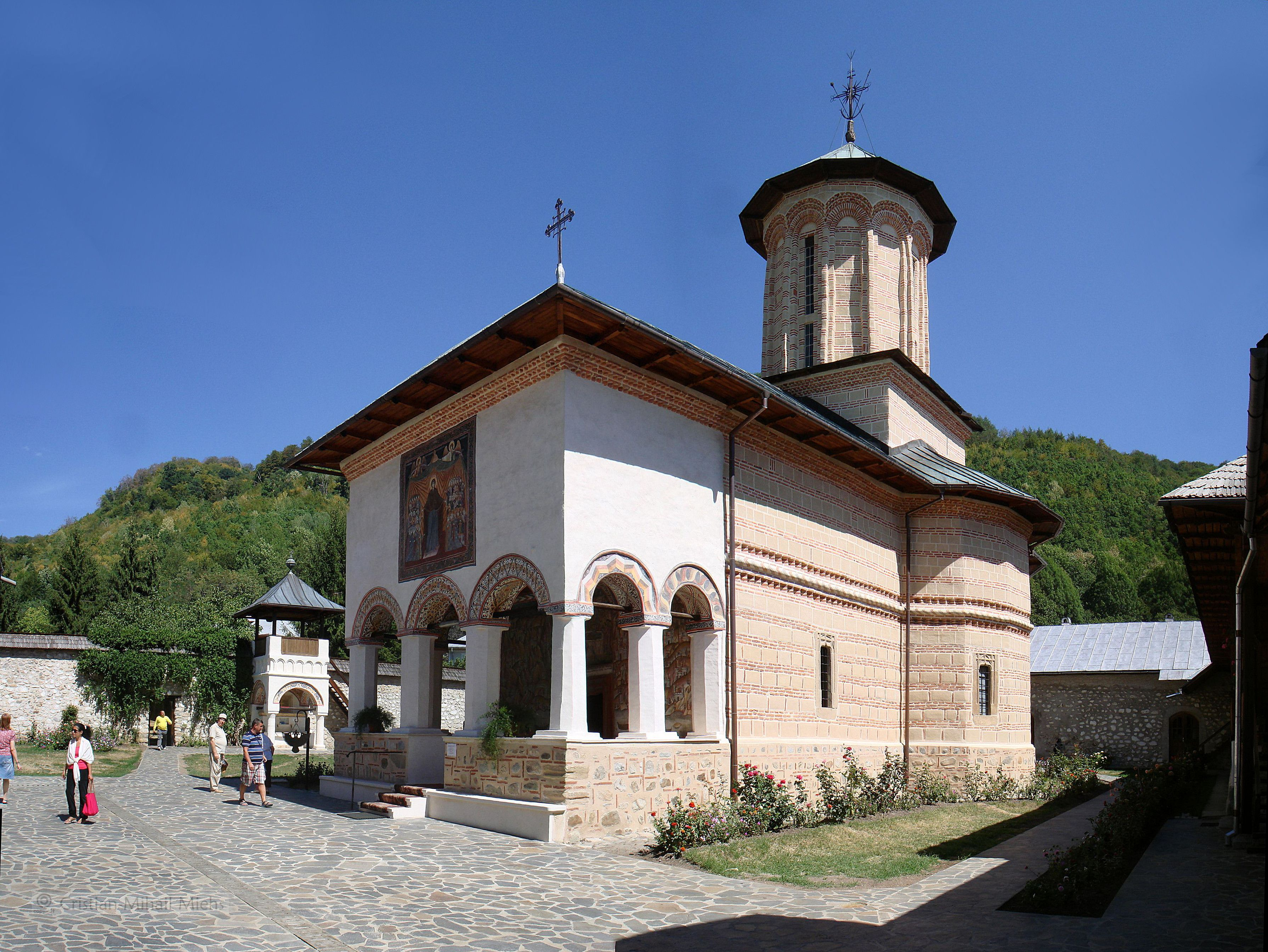
- Polovragi Monastery

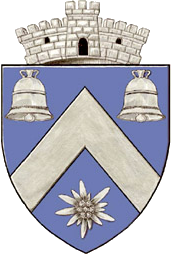
- Coat of arms

- Location in Romania
- Coordinates: 45°11′N 23°48′E
- Country: Romania
- County: Gorj
- Subdivisions: Polovragi, Racovița

Government
  - Mayor (2020–2024): Gheorghe Epure (PSD)
- Area: 84.95 km^{2} (32.80 sq mi)
- Elevation: 546 m (1,791 ft)
- Population (2021-12-01): 2,693
  - Density: 31.70/km^{2} (82.11/sq mi)
- Time zone: UTC+02:00 (EET)
  - Summer (DST): UTC+03:00 (EEST)
- Postal code: 217365
- Area code: +(40) 253
- Vehicle reg.: GJ
- Website: comunapolovragi.ro

Polovragi is a commune in Gorj County, Oltenia, Romania. It is composed of two villages, Polovragi and Racovița.

The commune is located in the northeastern part of Gorj County, 54 km (34 mi) from the county seat, Târgu Jiu, on the border with Vâlcea County. National road DN67 connects it to Târgu Jiu and Drobeta-Turnu Severin to the west and to Râmnicu Vâlcea to the east.

Polovragi is situated in a hilly area at the foot of the Southern Carpathians, at an altitude of 546 m (1,791 ft). It lies on the banks of the river Olteț, which has its source in the Căpățână Mountains, and carves a 3 km (1.9 mi)-long gorge just to the north of Polovragi village. In the gorge, some 20 m (66 ft) above the river, is the Polovragi Cave, where about 300 horseshoe bats roost. The cave is said to have been home to Zalmoxis, a divinity of the Getae and Dacians; the "Dacian Oven" and "Zalmoxis' Throne" are among the rock formations that can be found here.

The Polovragi Monastery was built in 1505 by ktitors Radu Comisul and Pătru Spătaru, the sons of boyar Danciu Zamona.

Andruță Ceaușescu (1886–1969), Nicolae Ceaușescu's father, was the descendant of a family of shepherds from Polovragi.

== See also ==
- Dacian fortress of Polovragi
