= Gota (Dârjov) =

- Location within Romania

Location
- Country: Romania
- Counties: Olt County

Physical characteristics
- Mouth: Dârjov
  - coordinates: 44.4897°N 24.4294°E
- Length: 11 km (6.8 mi)
- Basin size: 36 km^{2} (14 sq mi)

Basin features
- Progression: Dârjov→ Olt→ Danube→ Black Sea
- Tributaries
  - left: Valea Pârvului
- River code: VIII.1.171.1

The Gota is a left tributary of the river Dârjov in Romania. It flows into the Dârjov in Buicești. Its length is 11 km (6.8 mi) and its basin size is 36 km^{2} (14 sq mi).
