= Homoroade =

- Commune
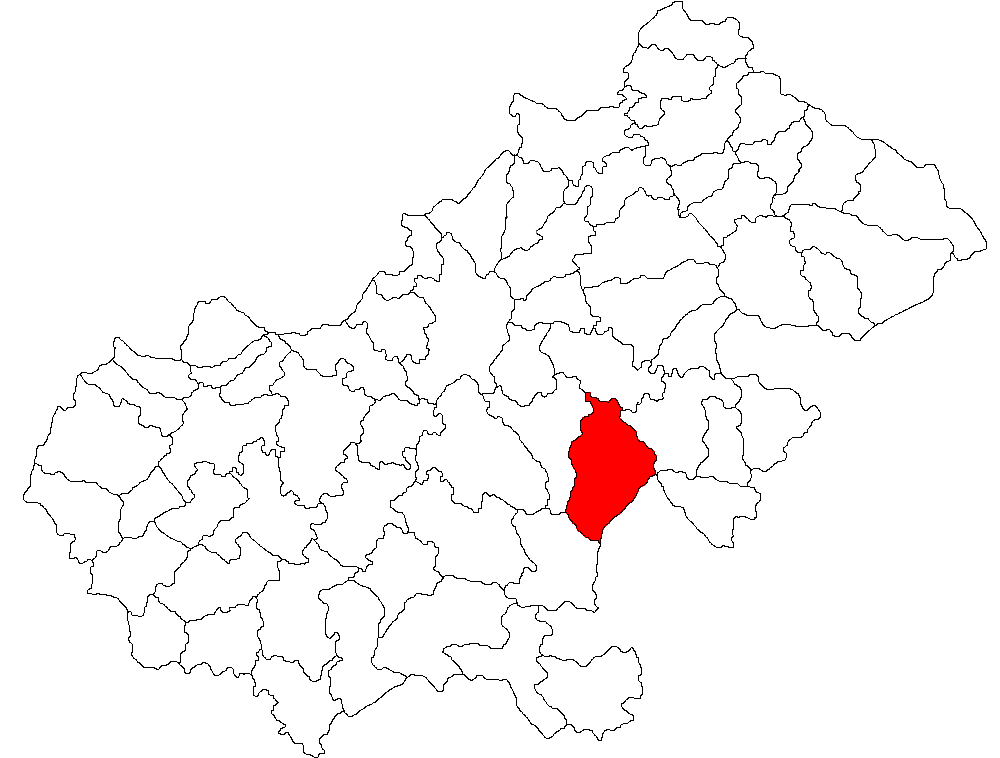
- Location in Satu Mare County

- Location in Romania
- Coordinates: 47°38′N 23°04′E
- Country: Romania
- County: Satu Mare
- Population (2021-12-01): 1,959
- Time zone: EET/EEST (UTC+2/+3)
- Vehicle reg.: SM

Homoroade (Hungarian: Középhomoród, Hungarian pronunciation: [ˈkøzeːphomoroːd]m German: Mittelhamroth) is a commune of 2,600 inhabitants situated in Satu Mare County, Romania. Its center is Homorodu de Mijloc, and the commune is composed of six villages:

In Romanian	In Hungarian
Chilia	Pácfalu
Homorodu de Jos	Középhomoród
Homorodu de Mijloc	Hadadnádasd
Homorodu de Sus	Felsőhomoród
Necopoi	Ivácskó
Solduba	Bükkszoldobágy
