= Gudea Mare =

Gudea Mare Göde-patak
- Location within Romania

Location
- Country: Romania
- Counties: Mureș County
- Villages: Stânceni

Physical characteristics
- Source: Gurghiu Mountains
- Mouth: Mureș
  - location: Stânceni
  - coordinates: 46.9596°N 25.2282°E
- Length: 14 km (8.7 mi)
- Basin size: 49 km^{2} (19 sq mi)

Basin features
- Progression: Mureș→ Tisza→ Danube→ Black Sea
- Tributaries
  - left: Gudea Mică

The Gudea Mare (Hungarian: Göde-patak) is a left tributary of the river Mureș in Transylvania, Romania. It discharges into the Mureș in Stânceni. Its length is 14 km (8.7 mi) and its basin size is 49 km^{2} (19 sq mi).
