= Alimpești =

- Commune
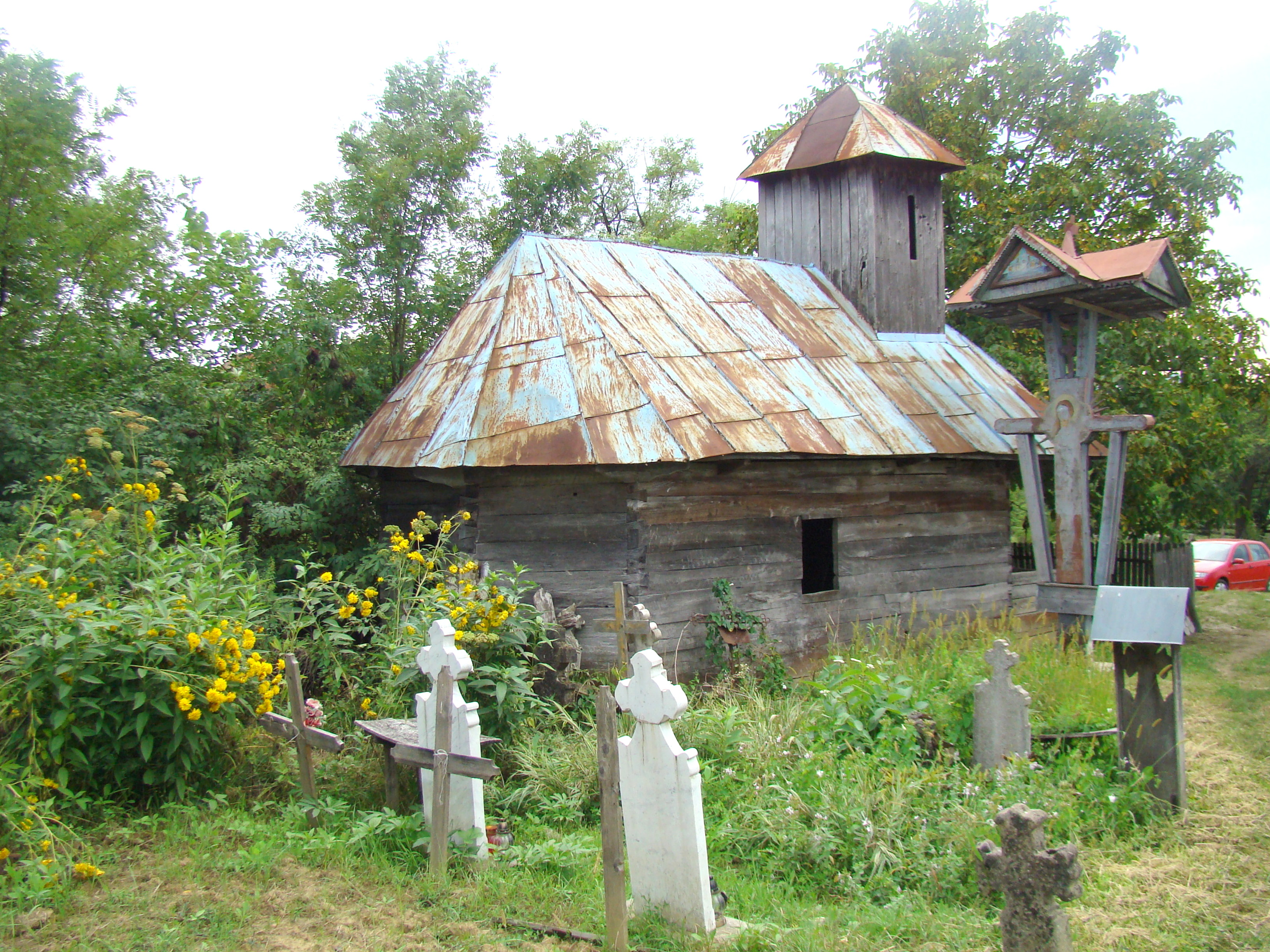
- Wooden church of the Archangels in Alimpești

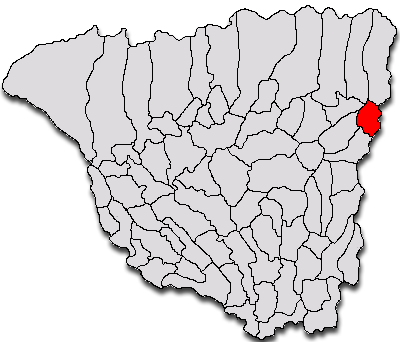
- Location in Gorj County

- Location in Romania
- Coordinates: 45°05′N 23°48′E
- Country: Romania
- County: Gorj
- Subdivisions: Alimpești, Ciupercenii de Olteț, Corșoru, Nistorești, Sârbești

Government
  - Mayor (2020–2024): Victor Drăgulescu (PSD)
- Area: 35.11 km^{2} (13.56 sq mi)
- Elevation: 371 m (1,217 ft)
- Population (2021-12-01): 1,639
  - Density: 46.68/km^{2} (120.9/sq mi)
- Time zone: UTC+02:00 (EET)
  - Summer (DST): UTC+03:00 (EEST)
- Postal code: 217015
- Area code: +(40) x53
- Vehicle reg.: GJ
- Website: www.primariaalimpesti.ro

Alimpești is a commune in Gorj County, Romania. It is composed of five villages: Alimpești, Ciupercenii de Olteț, Corșoru, Nistorești, and Sârbești.

The commune is situated on the Getic Plateau, in the foothills of the Southern Carpathians, at an altitude of 371 m (1,217 ft). The river Olteț flows north to south through it. Alimpești is located in the northeastern part of Gorj County, 50 km (31 mi) from the county seat, Târgu Jiu, on the border with Vâlcea County.

== Natives ==
Denisa Golgotă (born 2002), artistic gymnast
