= Gălăuțaș (river) =

Gălăuțaș Galócás-patak
- Location within Romania

Location
- Country: Romania
- Counties: Harghita County
- Villages: Gălăuțaș

Physical characteristics
- Mouth: Mureș
  - location: Gălăuțaș
  - coordinates: 46.908°N 25.409°E
- Length: 11 km (6.8 mi)
- Basin size: 16 km^{2} (6.2 sq mi)

Basin features
- Progression: Mureș→ Tisza→ Danube→ Black Sea

The Gălăuțaș (Hungarian: Galócás-patak) is a small river in the Gurghiu Mountains, Harghita County, central Romania. Its name is from the Hungarian "galóca", meaning "amanita" (mushroom). It is a left tributary of the river Mureș. It flows through the municipality Gălăuțaș, and joins the Mureș in the village Gălăuțaș. Its length is 11 km (6.8 mi) and its basin size is 16 km^{2} (6.2 sq mi).
