= Căpreni =

- Commune
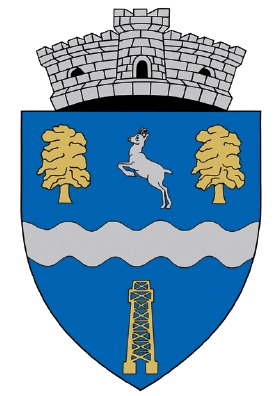
- Coat of arms

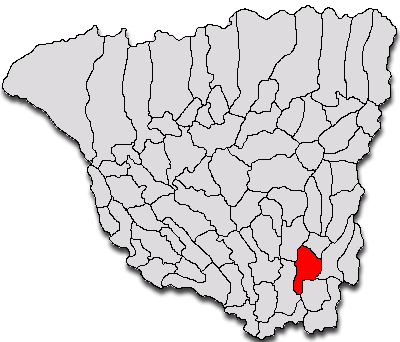
- Location in Gorj County

- Location in Romania
- Coordinates: 44°45′N 23°37′E
- Country: Romania
- County: Gorj
- Subdivisions: Aluniș, Brătești, Bulbuceni, Căpreni, Cetatea, Cornetu, Dealu Spirei, Satu Nou

Government
  - Mayor (2020–2024): Emil Cătănoiu (PSD)
- Area: 57.3 km^{2} (22.1 sq mi)
- Elevation: 222 m (728 ft)
- Population (2021-12-01): 1,970
  - Density: 34/km^{2} (89/sq mi)
- Time zone: EET/EEST (UTC+2/+3)
- Postal code: 217125
- Area code: +(40) x53
- Vehicle reg.: GJ
- Website: primariacapreni.ro

Căpreni is a commune in Gorj County, Oltenia, Romania. It is composed of eight villages: Aluniș, Brătești, Bulbuceni, Căpreni, Cetatea, Cornetu, Dealu Spirei, and Satu Nou.
