= Valea Mare, Olt =

Valea Mare
- Commune
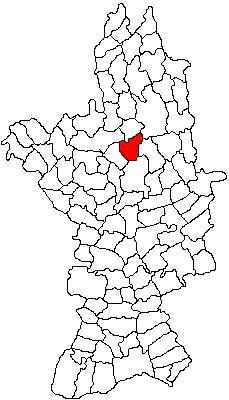
- Location in Olt County

- Location in Romania
- Coordinates: 44°28′N 24°27′E
- Country: Romania
- County: Olt
- Area: 57.32 km^{2} (22.13 sq mi)
- Population (2021-12-01): 3,546
  - Density: 61.86/km^{2} (160.2/sq mi)
- Time zone: UTC+02:00 (EET)
  - Summer (DST): UTC+03:00 (EEST)
- Vehicle reg.: OT

Valea Mare is a commune in Olt County, Muntenia, Romania. It is composed of five villages: Bârca, Recea, Turia, Valea Mare and Zorleasca.
