= Săulești =

- Commune
- Location in Romania
- Coordinates: 44°48′N 23°29′E
- Country: Romania
- County: Gorj
- Subdivisions: Bibești, Dolcești, Purcaru, Săulești

Government
  - Mayor (2020–2024): Constantin Drăghici-Rucsanda (PSD)
- Area: 55.73 km^{2} (21.52 sq mi)
- Population (2021-12-01): 2,061
  - Density: 36.98/km^{2} (95.78/sq mi)
- Time zone: UTC+02:00 (EET)
  - Summer (DST): UTC+03:00 (EEST)
- Vehicle reg.: GJ

Săulești is a commune in Gorj County, Oltenia, Romania. It is composed of four villages: Bibești, Dolcești, Purcaru and Săulești.
