= Bărbătești, Gorj =

Bărbătești
- Commune
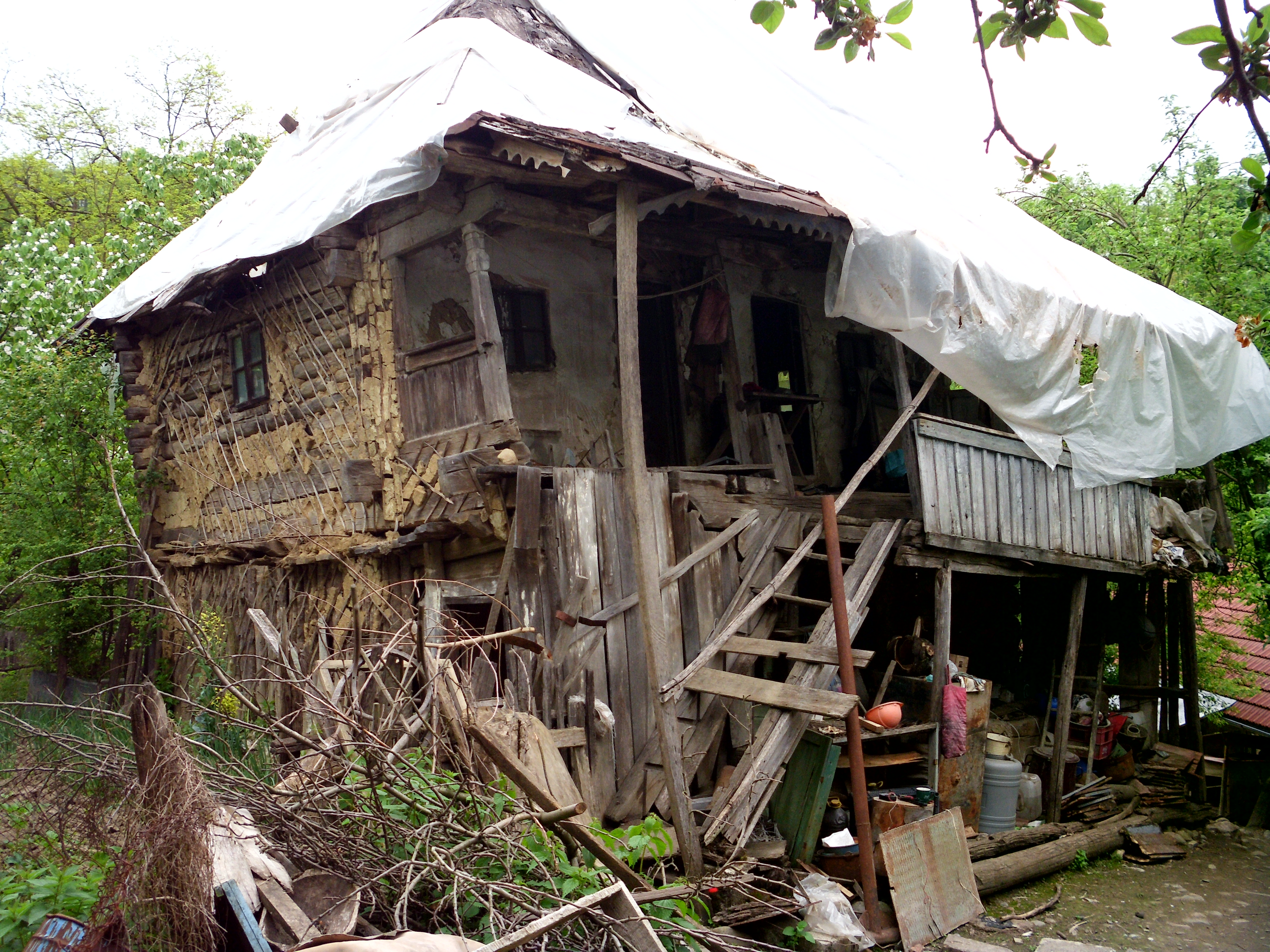
- Florian wooden house in Socu

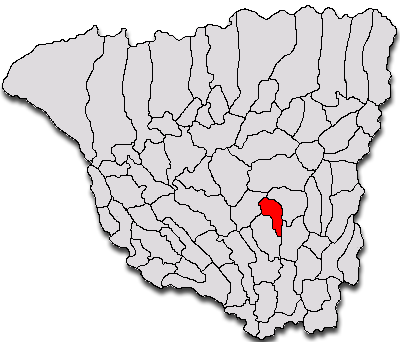
- Location in Gorj County

- Location in Romania
- Coordinates: 44°52′19″N 23°30′26″E
- Country: Romania
- County: Gorj
- Established: 1438 (first attested)
- Subdivisions: Bărbătești, Musculești, Petrești, Socu

Government
  - Mayor (2020–2024): Adrian Mangu (PSD)
- Area: 37.87 km^{2} (14.62 sq mi)
- Elevation: 195 m (640 ft)
- Population (2021-12-01): 1,418
  - Density: 37.44/km^{2} (96.98/sq mi)
- Time zone: UTC+02:00 (EET)
  - Summer (DST): UTC+03:00 (EEST)
- Postal code: 217055
- Area code: +(40) 253
- Vehicle reg.: GJ
- Website: www.comunabarbatesti.ro

Bărbătești is a commune in Gorj County, Oltenia, Romania. It is composed of four villages: Bărbătești, Musculești, Petrești, and Socu.
