= Ghireni =

- Location within Romania

Location
- Country: Romania
- Counties: Botoșani County

Physical characteristics
- Mouth: Prut
  - coordinates: 48.0917°N 27.0264°E
- Length: 20 km (12 mi)
- Basin size: 66 km^{2} (25 sq mi)
- Discharge
  - location: *
  - minimum: 0.003 m^{3}/s (0.11 cu ft/s)
  - maximum: 57.1 m^{3}/s (2,020 cu ft/s)

Basin features
- Progression: Prut→ Danube→ Black Sea

The Ghireni is a right tributary of the river Prut in Romania. It discharges into the Prut in Mitoc, on the border with Moldova. Its length is 20 km (12 mi) and its basin size is 66 km^{2} (25 sq mi).
