= Prigoria =

- Commune
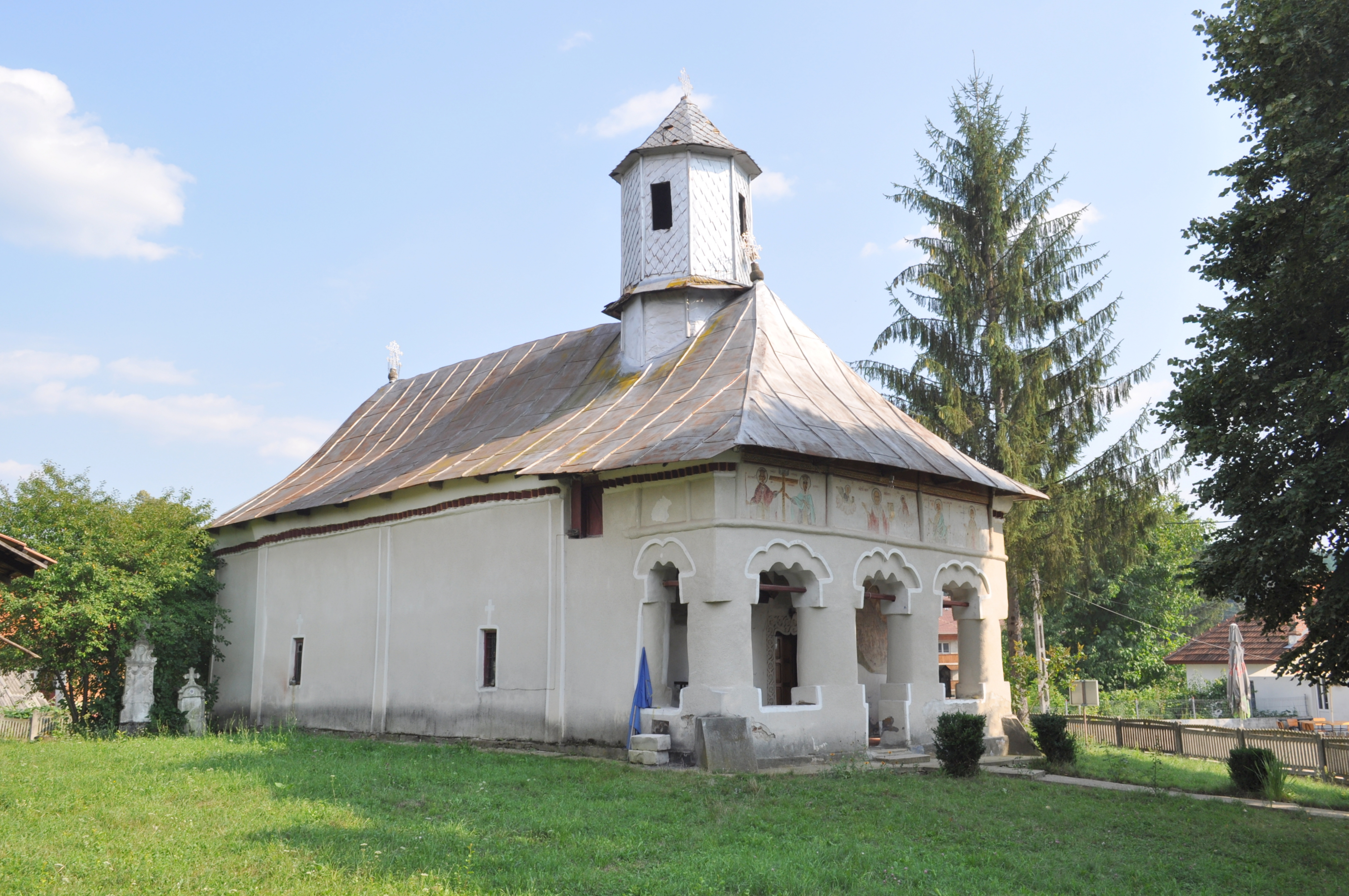
- Saint Nicholas' Church in Prigoria

- Location in Romania
- Coordinates: 45°04′N 23°41′E
- Country: Romania
- County: Gorj
- Subdivisions: Bucșana, Burlani, Călugăreasa, Dobrana, Negoiești, Prigoria, Zorlești

Government
  - Mayor (2020–2024): Lucian Goață (PSD)
- Area: 66.9 km^{2} (25.8 sq mi)
- Elevation: 314 m (1,030 ft)
- Population (2021-12-01): 2,709
  - Density: 40.5/km^{2} (105/sq mi)
- Time zone: UTC+02:00 (EET)
  - Summer (DST): UTC+03:00 (EEST)
- Postal code: 217370
- Area code: +(40) 253
- Vehicle reg.: GJ
- Website: primariaprigoria.ro

Prigoria is a commune in Gorj County, Oltenia, Romania. It is composed of seven villages: Bucșana, Burlani, Călugăreasa, Dobrana, Negoiești, Prigoria, and Zorlești.

Prigoria is known in Romania for being the place where the index case of a COVID-infected person was found in the country, on February 26, 2020.
