= Păulești, Satu Mare =

Păulești
- Commune
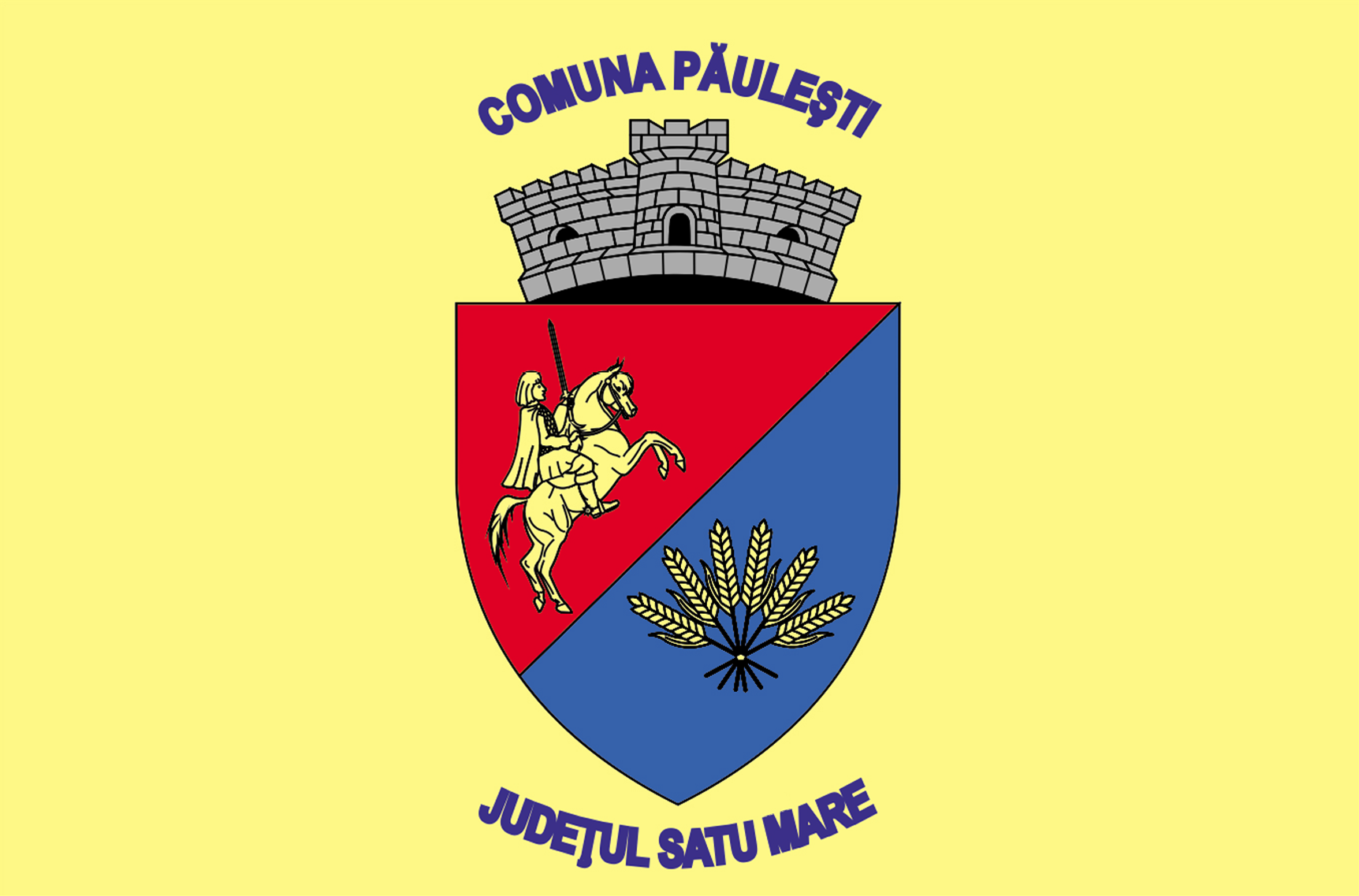
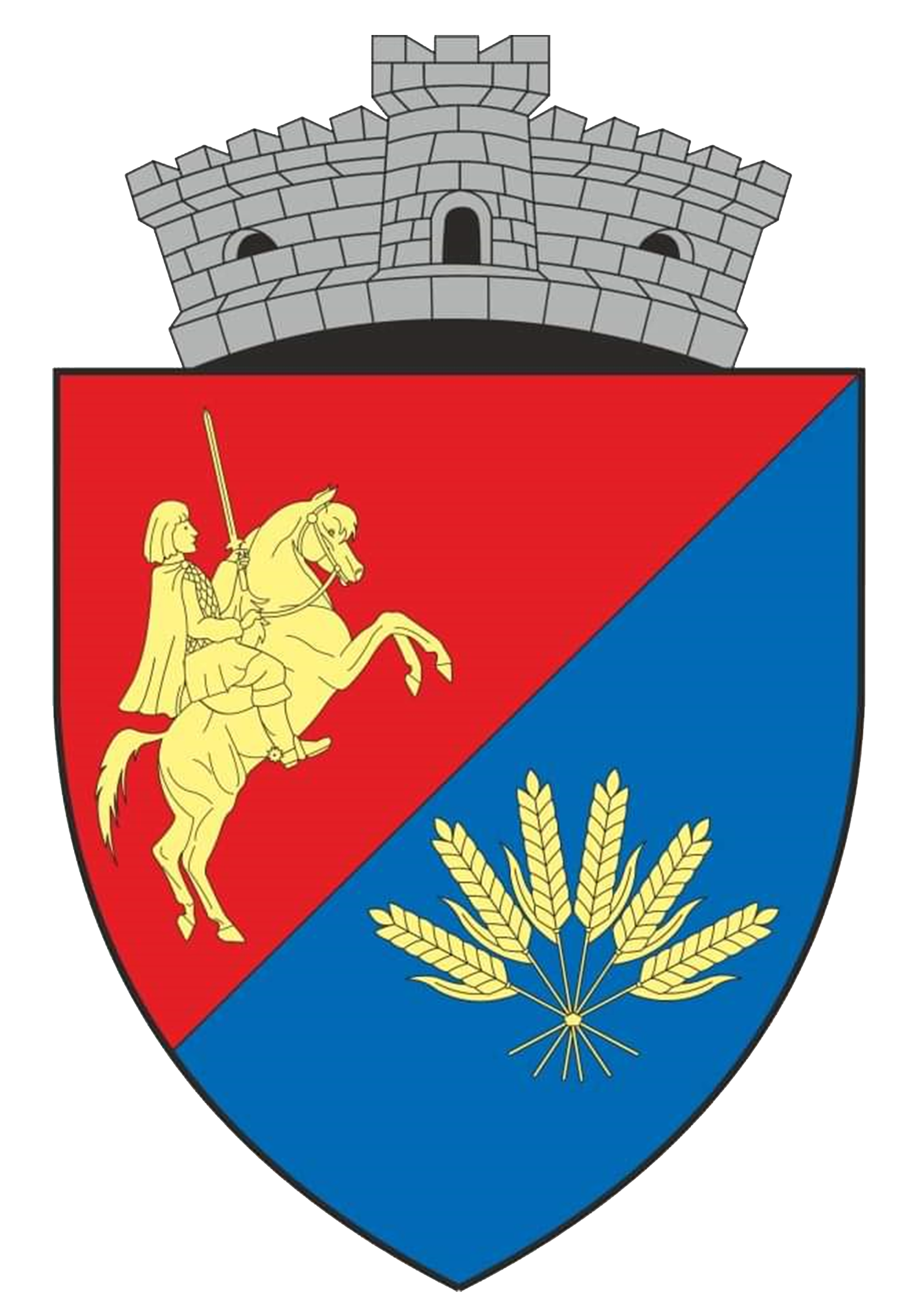
- Flag Coat of arms

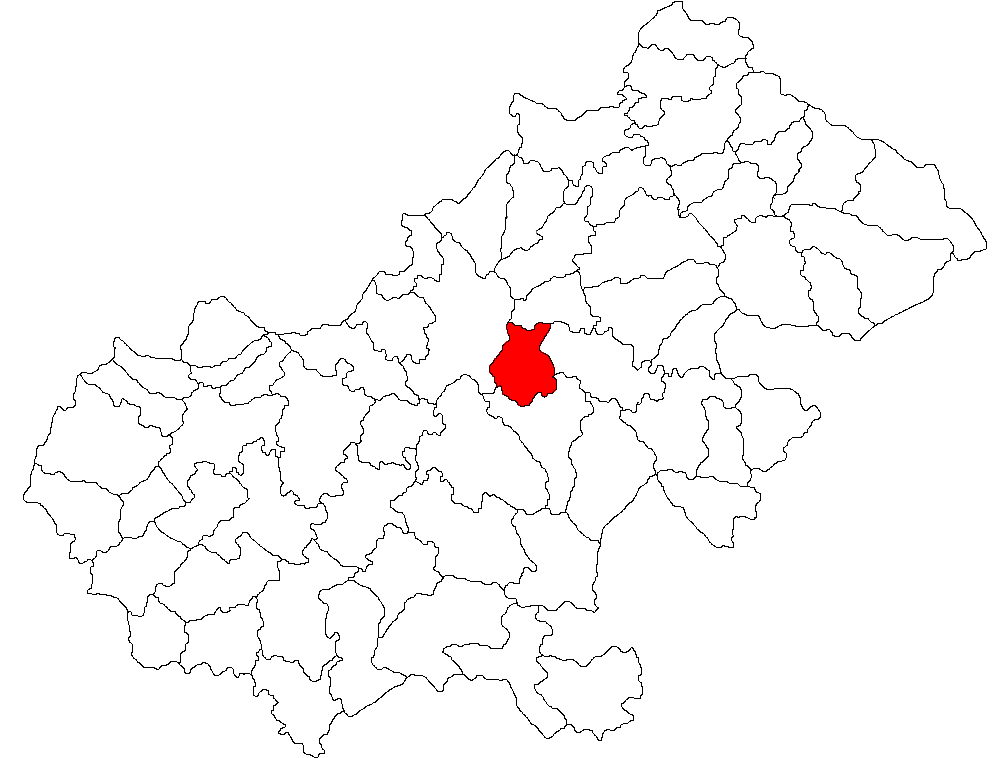
- Location in Satu Mare County

- Location in Romania
- Coordinates: 47.779°N 22.920°E
- Country: Romania
- County: Satu Mare

Government
  - Mayor (2020–2024): Zenoviu-Stelian Bontea (PNL)
- Area: 60.43 km^{2} (23.33 sq mi)
- Elevation: 123 m (404 ft)
- Population (2021-12-01): 5,775
  - Density: 96/km^{2} (250/sq mi)
- Time zone: EET/EEST (UTC+2/+3)
- Postal code: 447230
- Area code: +(40) x59
- Vehicle reg.: SM
- Website: paulestism.ro

Păulești (Hungarian: Szatmárpálfalva, Hungarian pronunciation: [ˈʃzɒtmaːrpaːlfɒlvɒ]) is a commune of 5,775 inhabitants situated in Satu Mare County, Romania. It is composed of six villages: Amați (Amac), Ambud (Ombod), Hrip (Hirip), Păulești, Petin (Pettyén), and Rușeni (Oroszfalva).

The commune is located in the central part of the county, 6 km (3.7 mi) east of the county seat, Satu Mare, and belongs to the Satu Mare metropolitan area.

== Demographics ==
At the 2011 census, the commune had 4,909 inhabitants, of which 46.1% were Hungarians, 38.9% Romanians, and 10.4% Roma. According to mother tongue, 56.59% spoke Hungarian as their first language, while 42.87% spoke Romanian. At the 2021 census, Păulești had a population of 5,775; of those, 59.31% were Romanians, 17.47% Hungarians, and 9.59% Roma.

== Twin towns ==
- Seregélyes, Hungary
