= Turburea =

- Commune
- Location in Romania
- Coordinates: 44°43′N 23°31′E
- Country: Romania
- County: Gorj
- Subdivisions: Cocorova, Poiana, Spahii, Șipotu, Turburea

Government
  - Mayor (2020–2024): Ion Bârcă (PSD)
- Area: 67.54 km^{2} (26.08 sq mi)
- Elevation: 148 m (486 ft)
- Population (2021-12-01): 3,916
  - Density: 58/km^{2} (150/sq mi)
- Time zone: EET/EEST (UTC+2/+3)
- Postal code: 217515
- Area code: +(40) x53
- Vehicle reg.: GJ
- Website: primariaturburea.ro

Turburea is a commune in Gorj County, Oltenia, Romania. It is composed of five villages: Cocorova, Poiana, Spahii, Șipotu, and Turburea.

== Natives ==
Constantina Diță (born 1970), long-distance runner
