= Crasna, Gorj =

Crasna
- Commune
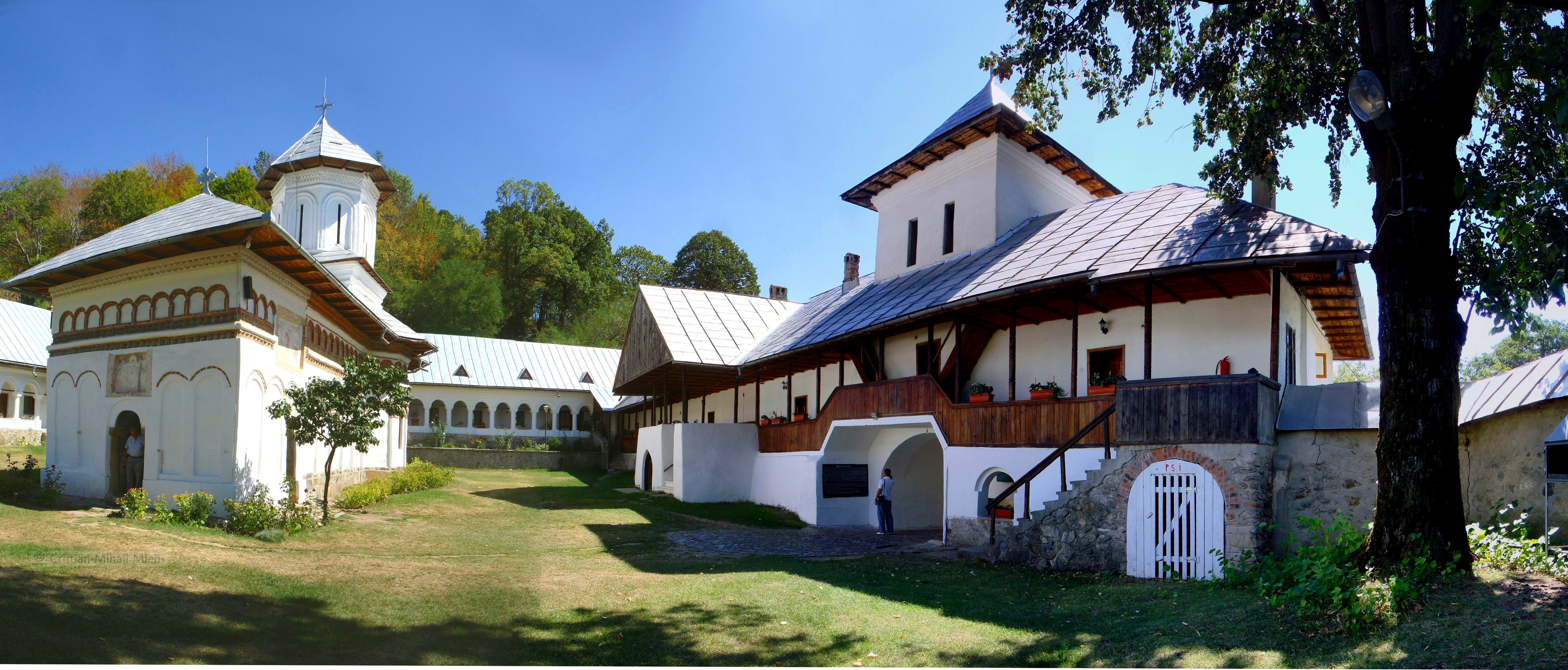

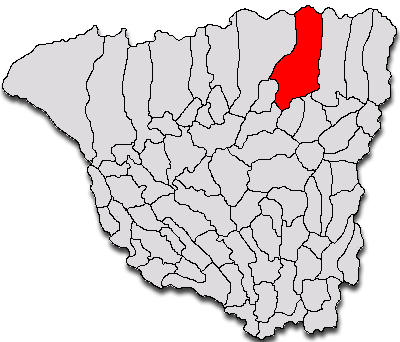
- Location in Gorj County

- Location in Romania
- Coordinates: 45°11′N 23°31′E
- Country: Romania
- County: Gorj
- Subdivisions: Aninișu din Deal, Aninișu din Vale, Buzești, Cărpiniș, Crasna, Crasna din Deal, Drăgoiești, Dumbrăveni, Radoși
- Population (2021-12-01): 4,698
- Time zone: UTC+02:00 (EET)
  - Summer (DST): UTC+03:00 (EEST)
- Vehicle reg.: GJ

Crasna is a commune in Gorj County, Oltenia, Romania. It is composed of nine villages: Aninișu din Deal, Aninișu din Vale, Buzești, Cărpiniș, Crasna, Crasna din Deal, Drăgoiești, Dumbrăveni and Radoși.
