= Jupânești =

- Commune
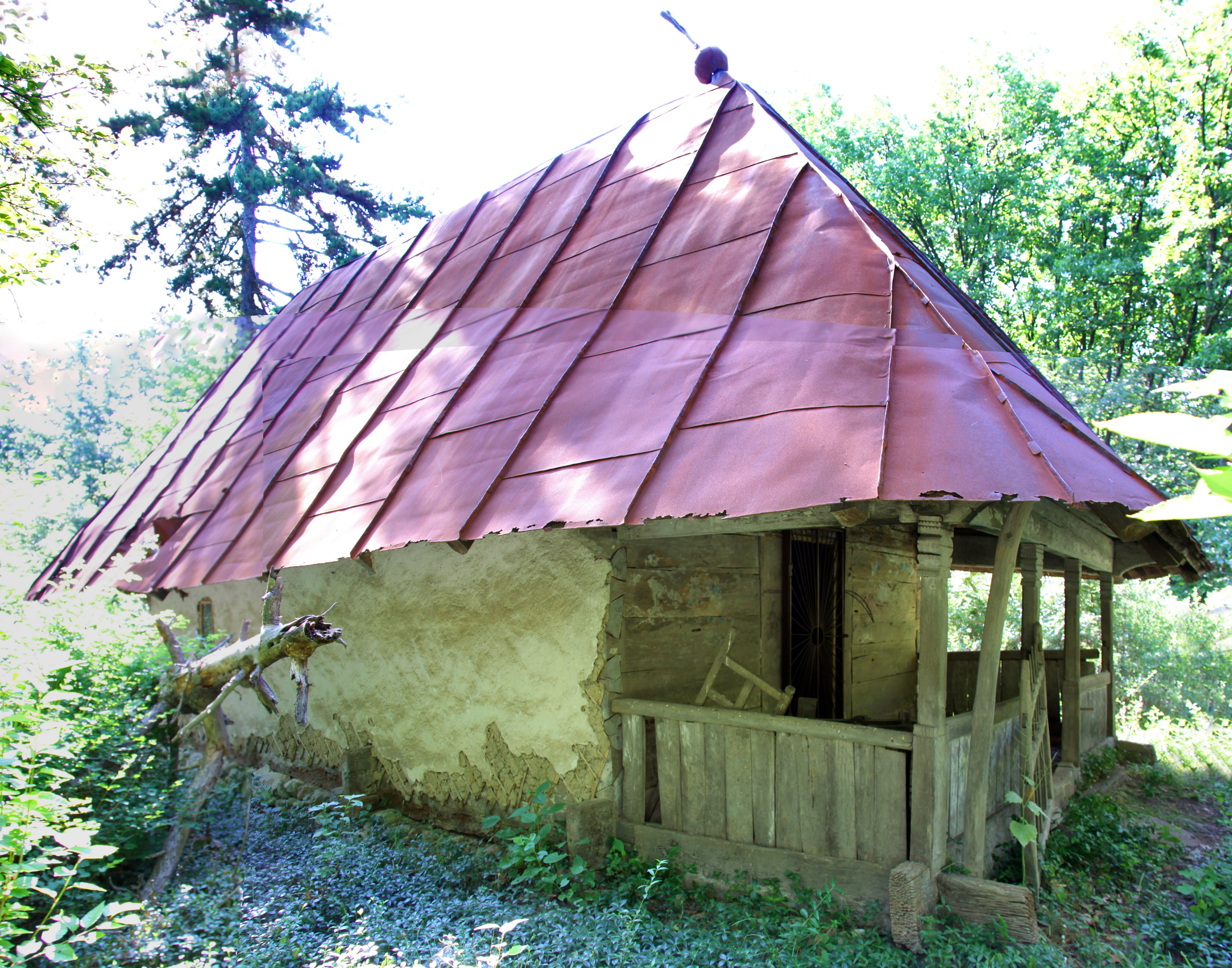
- Wooden church in Boia

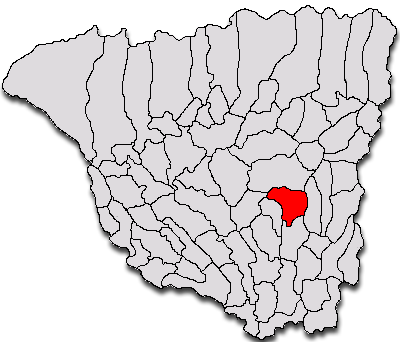
- Location in Gorj County

- Location in Romania
- Coordinates: 44°54′N 23°32′E
- Country: Romania
- County: Gorj
- Subdivisions: Boia, Jupânești, Pârâu Boia, Vidin, Vierșani

Government
  - Mayor (2020–2024): Ion Gîrniceanu (PRO)
- Area: 57.24 km^{2} (22.10 sq mi)
- Elevation: 203 m (666 ft)
- Population (2021-12-01): 1,854
  - Density: 32.39/km^{2} (83.89/sq mi)
- Time zone: UTC+02:00 (EET)
  - Summer (DST): UTC+03:00 (EEST)
- Postal code: 217270
- Area code: +(40) x53
- Vehicle reg.: GJ
- Website: www.primariajupinesti.ro

Jupânești is a commune in Gorj County, Oltenia, Romania. It is composed of five villages: Boia, Jupânești, Pârâu Boia, Vidin, and Vierșani.
