= Novaci, Romania =

Novaci
- Town
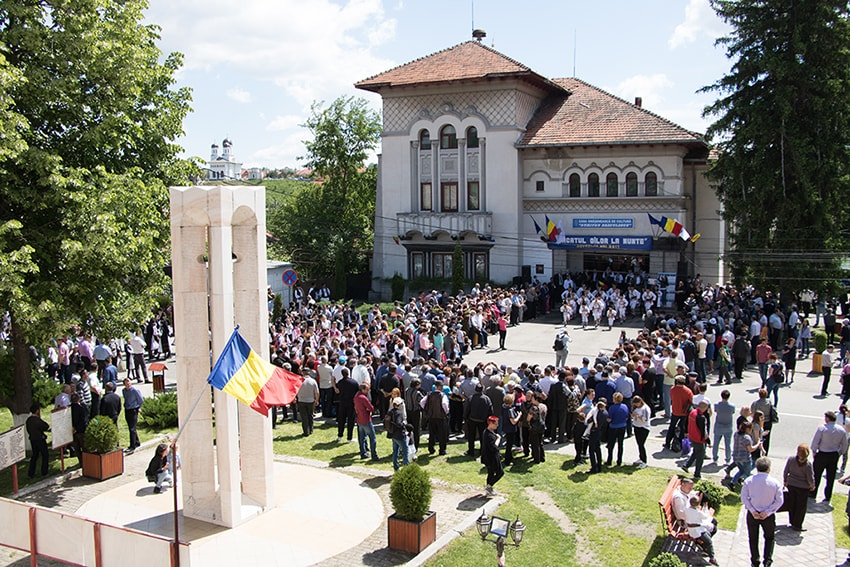

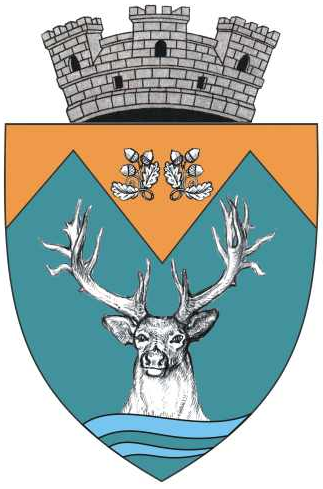
- Coat of arms

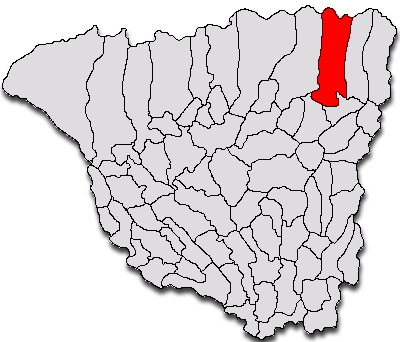
- Location in Gorj County

- Location in Romania
- Coordinates: 45°10′48″N 23°40′12″E
- Country: Romania
- County: Gorj

Government
  - Mayor (2024–2028): Dumitru Leuștean (PSD)
- Area: 240 km^{2} (93 sq mi)
- Elevation: 460 m (1,510 ft)
- Population (2021-12-01): 5,276
  - Density: 22/km^{2} (57/sq mi)
- Time zone: UTC+02:00 (EET)
  - Summer (DST): UTC+03:00 (EEST)
- Postal code: 215300
- Area code: (+40) 02 53
- Vehicle reg.: GJ
- Website: primarianovaci.ro

Historical population
Year	Pop.	±%
1977	6,464	—
1992	6,427	−0.6%
2002	6,151	−4.3%
2011	5,431	−11.7%
2021	5,276	−2.9%
Source: Census data

Novaci is a town in Gorj County, Oltenia, Romania, situated at the foothills of the Parâng Mountains, on the river Gilort. It administers four villages: Bercești, Hirișești, Pociovaliștea, and Sitești.

The river traditionally divided the Oltenian settlement of Novacii Români from Novacii Străini, populated mainly by shepherds coming from over the mountains, from Sibiu County in Transylvania. The differences between the two segments of the town are obvious in the traditional vernacular architecture: the low fences of Oltenia are replaced by tall gates and hidden-away courtyards in the Novacii Străini.

The population has been steadily decreasing since the 1990s, mainly because of the migration of the young, educated inhabitants to bigger cities.

Only 12 km (7.5 mi) from Novaci, passing the Transalpina (DN67C) road is Rânca (1,600 m (5,200 ft) altitude), a newly developed resort surrounded by mountain peaks. From this place is a view of the Parângu Mare peak and when the weather is good you can see the Peleaga peak of the Retezat Mountains. During winter there are two ski slopes with low and medium difficulty.

== Natives ==
- Alin Mituța (born 1984), politician
- Cristian Dumitru Popescu (born 1964), mathematician
