= Brănești, Gorj =

Brănești
- Commune
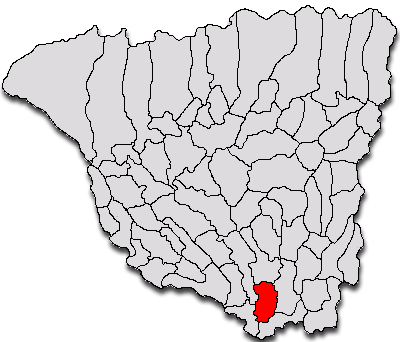
- Location in Gorj County

- Location in Romania
- Coordinates: 44°40′N 23°29′E
- Country: Romania
- County: Gorj
- Subdivisions: Bădești, Brănești, Brebenei, Capu Dealului, Gilortu, Pârâu
- Area: 45.61 km^{2} (17.61 sq mi)
- Population (2021-12-01): 2,178
  - Density: 47.75/km^{2} (123.7/sq mi)
- Time zone: UTC+02:00 (EET)
  - Summer (DST): UTC+03:00 (EEST)
- Vehicle reg.: GJ

Brănești is a commune in Gorj County, Oltenia, Romania. It is composed of six villages: Bădești, Brănești, Brebenei, Capu Dealului, Gilortu and Pârâu.
