= Plopșoru =

- Commune
- Location in Romania
- Coordinates: 44°47′N 23°21′E
- Country: Romania
- County: Gorj
- Subdivisions: Broșteni, Broștenii de Sus, Ceplea, Cursaru, Deleni, Izvoarele, Olari, Piscuri, Plopșoru, Sărdănești, Văleni

Government
  - Mayor (2020–2024): Petre Grigorie (PSD)
- Area: 80.03 km^{2} (30.90 sq mi)
- Population (2021-12-01): 5,530
  - Density: 69.1/km^{2} (179/sq mi)
- Time zone: UTC+02:00 (EET)
  - Summer (DST): UTC+03:00 (EEST)
- Postal code: 217345
- Vehicle reg.: GJ

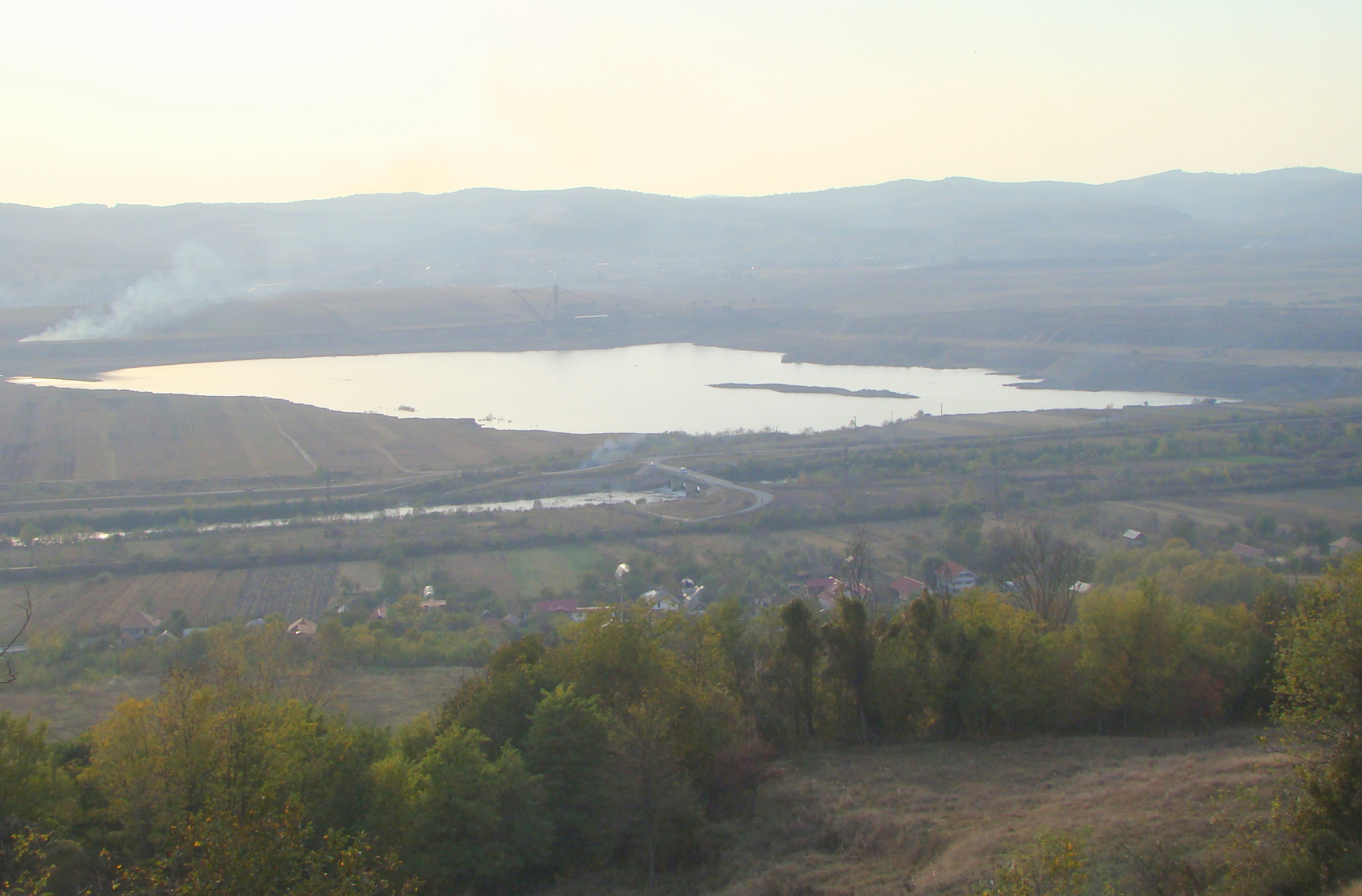

Plopșoru is a commune in Gorj County, Oltenia, Romania. It is composed of eleven villages: Broșteni, Broștenii de Sus, Ceplea, Cursaru, Deleni, Izvoarele, Olari, Piscuri, Plopșoru, Sărdănești and Văleni.
