= Săcelu =

- Commune
- Location in Romania
- Coordinates: 45°06′N 23°32′E
- Country: Romania
- County: Gorj
- Subdivisions: Blahnița de Sus, Hăiești, Jeriștea, Magherești, Săcelu
- Area: 42.06 km^{2} (16.24 sq mi)
- Population (2021-12-01): 1,305
  - Density: 31.03/km^{2} (80.36/sq mi)
- Time zone: UTC+02:00 (EET)
  - Summer (DST): UTC+03:00 (EEST)
- Vehicle reg.: GJ

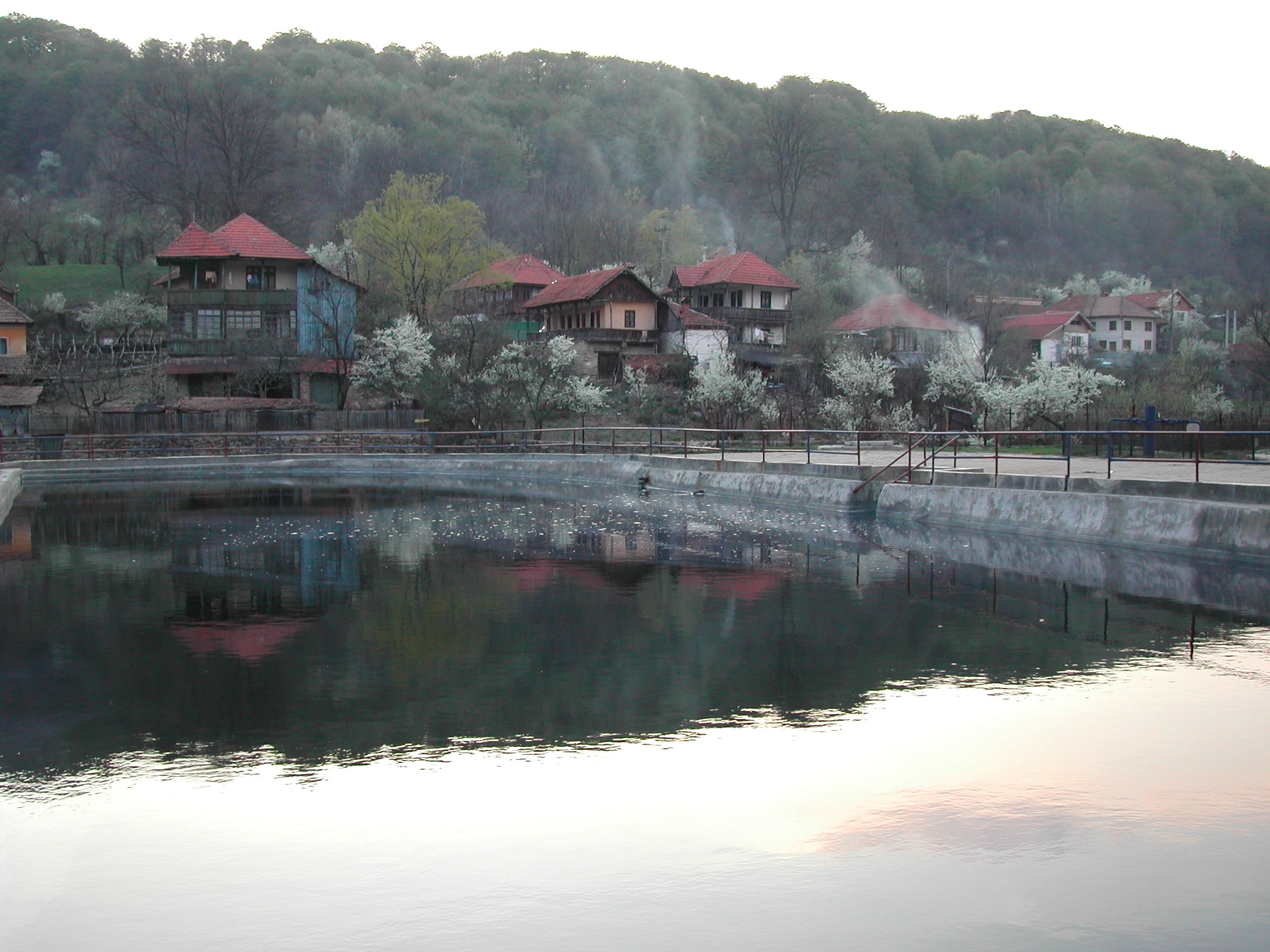
Săcelu

Săcelu is a commune in Gorj County, Oltenia, Romania. It is composed of five villages: Blahnița de Sus, Hăiești, Jeriștea, Magherești and Săcelu.
