= Vladimir, Gorj =

Vladimir
- Commune
- Location in Romania
- Coordinates: 44°50′N 23°34′E
- Country: Romania
- County: Gorj
- Subdivisions: Andreești, Frasin, Valea Deșului, Vladimir
- Population (2021-12-01): 2,597
- Time zone: EET/EEST (UTC+2/+3)
- Vehicle reg.: GJ

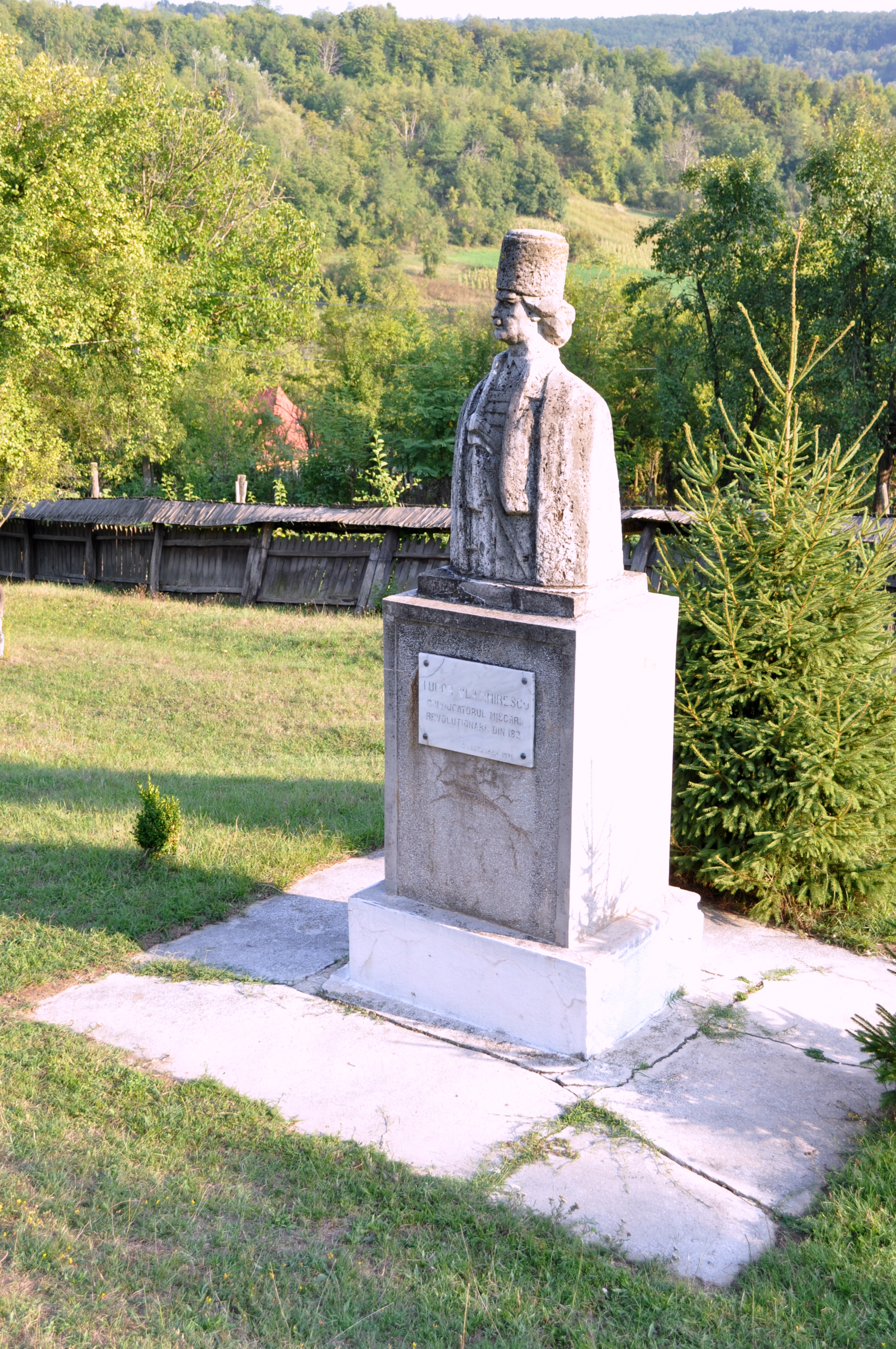
Bust of Tudor Vladimirescu in Vladimir

Vladimir is a commune in Gorj County, Oltenia, Romania, with a population of 2,793. It is composed of four villages: Andreești, Frasin, Valea Deșului, and Vladimir. Tudor Vladimirescu, the Romanian revolutionary hero and the leader of the Wallachian uprising of 1821 was born in the Vladimir village and the house where he was born is now a museum.
