= Aninoasa, Gorj =

Aninoasa
- Commune
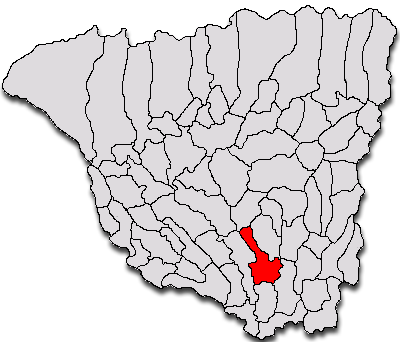
- Location in Gorj County

- Location in Romania
- Coordinates: 44°45′N 23°29′E
- Country: Romania
- County: Gorj
- Subdivisions: Aninoasa, Bobaia, Costești, Groșerea, Sterpoaia

Government
  - Mayor (2024–2028): Marius Dimulescu (PNL)
- Area: 92.46 km^{2} (35.70 sq mi)
- Elevation: 161 m (528 ft)
- Population (2021-12-01): 3,428
  - Density: 37/km^{2} (96/sq mi)
- Time zone: EET/EEST (UTC+2/+3)
- Postal code: 217020
- Area code: +(40) 253
- Vehicle reg.: GJ
- Website: aninoasa-gorj.ro

Aninoasa is a commune in Gorj County, Oltenia, Romania. It is composed of five villages: Aninoasa, Bobaia, Costești, Groșerea, and Sterpoaia.

== Natives ==
- Ilie Văduva (1934–1998), communist politician who served as the Minister of Foreign Affairs in 1985–1986.
