= Bengești-Ciocadia =

- Commune
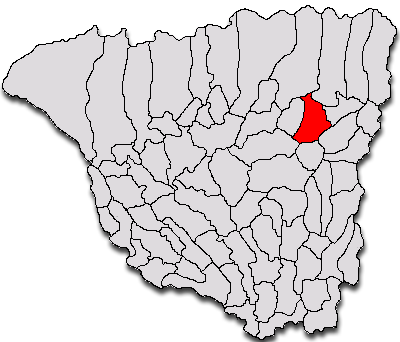
- Location in Gorj County

- Location in Romania
- Coordinates: 45°04′N 23°36′E
- Country: Romania
- County: Gorj
- Subdivisions: Bengești, Bălcești, Bircii, Ciocadia
- Area: 47.47 km^{2} (18.33 sq mi)
- Population (2021-12-01): 3,083
  - Density: 64.95/km^{2} (168.2/sq mi)
- Time zone: UTC+02:00 (EET)
  - Summer (DST): UTC+03:00 (EEST)
- Vehicle reg.: GJ

Bengești-Ciocadia is a commune in Gorj County, Oltenia, Romania. It is composed of four villages: Bengești (the commune centre), Bălcești, Bircii and Ciocadia.
