= Gorj County =

County of Romania

Gorj County Județul Gorj
- County
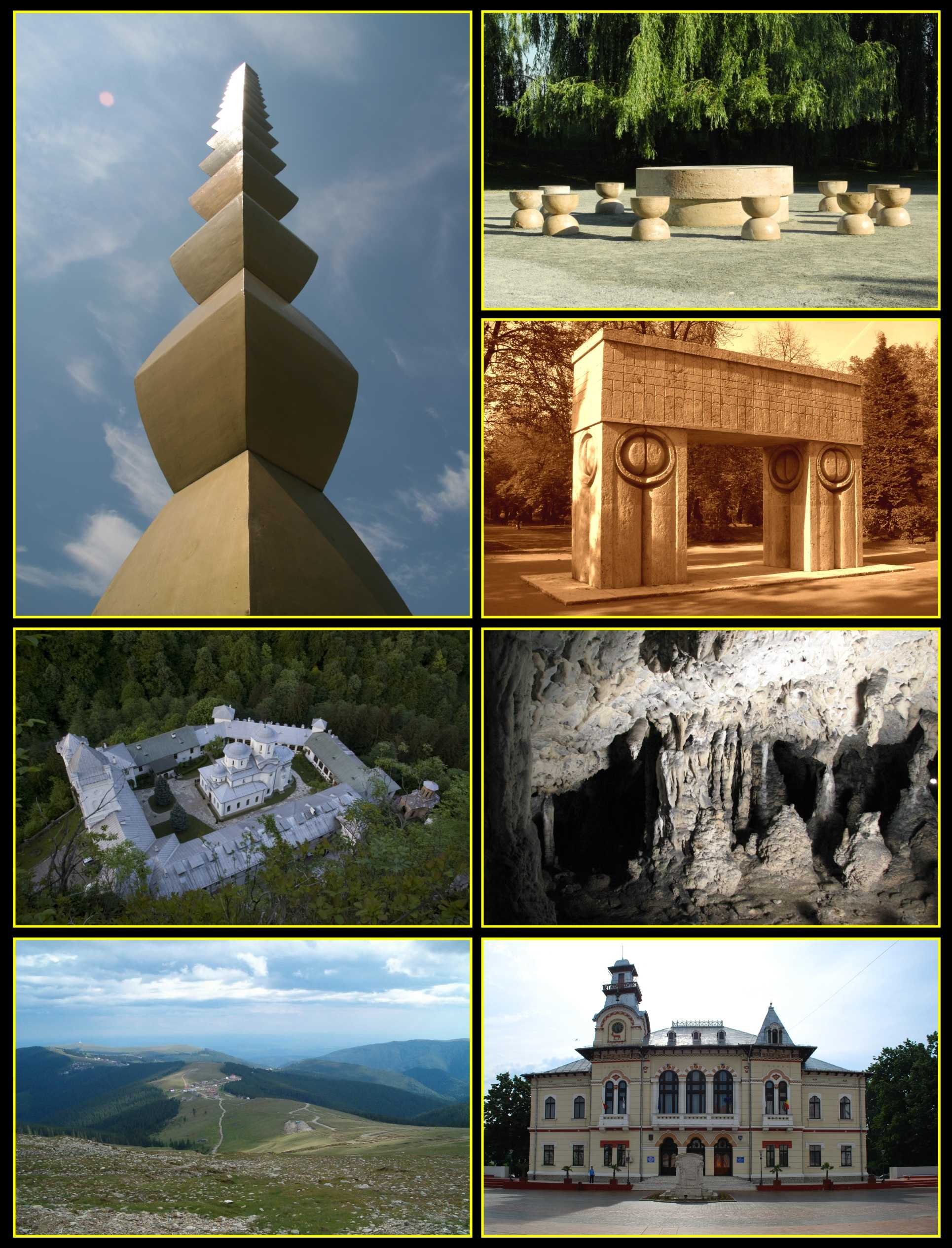

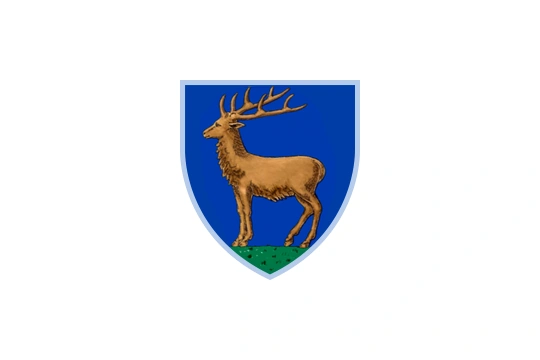
- Flag Coat of arms

- Coordinates: 45.04°N 23.3°E
- Country: Romania
- Development region^{1}: Sud-Vest
- Historic region: Oltenia
- Capital city (Reședință de județ): Târgu Jiu

Government
  - Type: County Council
  - Council President: Cosmin-Mihai Popescu (PSD)
  - Prefect^{2}: Virgil Drăgușin

Area
  - Total: 5,602 km^{2} (2,163 sq mi)
  - Rank: 21st in Romania

Population (2021-12-01)
  - Total: 314,685
  - Rank: 28th in Romania
  - Density: 56.17/km^{2} (145.5/sq mi)
- Time zone: UTC+2 (EET)
  - Summer (DST): UTC+3 (EEST)
- Postal Code: 21wxyz^{3}
- Area code: +40 x53^{4}
- Car Plates: GJ^{5}
- GDP: US$2.824 billion (2015)
- GDP per capita: US$8,450 (2015)
- Website: County Council; County Prefecture
- ^{1} The development regions of Romania have no administrative role and were formed in order to manage funds from the European Union^{2} as of 2007, the Prefect is not a politician, but a public functionary. He (or she) is not allowed to be a member of a political party, and is banned from having any political activity in the first six months after his resignation (or exclusion) from the public functionaries' corps.^{3}w, x, y, and z are digits that indicate the city, the street, part of the street, or even the building of the address^{4}x is a digit indicating the operator: 2 for the former national operator, Romtelecom, and 3 for the other ground telephone networks^{5}used on both the plates of the vehicles that operate only in the county limits (like utility vehicles, ATVs, etc.), and the ones used outside the county

Gorj County (Romanian pronunciation: [ɡorʒ]) is a county (județ) of Romania, in Oltenia, with its capital city at Târgu Jiu. Gorj comes from the Slavic Gornji Jiu ("upper Jiu"), in contrast with Dolnji ("lower Jiu").

== Demographics ==
At the 2011 census, the county had a population of 334,238 and its population density was 59.66/km^{2} (154.5/sq mi).

- Romanians – over 98%
- Roma, others – c. 2%

At the 2021 census, Gorj County had a population of 314,685.

Year	County population
1948	280,524
1956	293,031 ▲
1966	298,382 ▲
1977	348,521 ▲
1992	400,100 ▲
2002	387,308 ▼
2011	334,238 ▼
2021	314,685 ▼

== Geography ==
Gorj County has a total area of 5,602 km^{2} (2,163 sq mi).

The North side of the county consists of various mountains from the Southern Carpathians group. In the West there are the Vâlcan Mountains, and in the East there are the Parâng Mountains and the Negoveanu Mountains. The two groups are split by the Jiu River.

To the South, the heights decrease through the hills to a high plain at the Western end of the Wallachian Plain.

The main river, which collects all the smaller rivers, is the Jiu River; its tributaries include the Tismana, Gilort, and Motru rivers.

=== Neighbours ===
- Vâlcea County to the east.
- Mehedinți County and Caraș-Severin County to the west.
- Hunedoara County to the north.
- Dolj County to the south.

== Economy ==
The predominant industries in the county are:

- Mining equipment industry.
- Food and beverages industry.
- Textile industry.
- Mechanical components industry.
- Glass industry.
- Wood industry.

In the southwestern and central parts of the county, coal is extracted near Motru and Rovinari. There are two big thermo electrical power plants at Rovinari and Turceni, and some hydro-electrical power plants. The county is the biggest electricity producer in Romania, with 36% of the country's electricity.

Due to the decrease in mining activity, the county has one of the highest unemployment levels in the country.

=== Succes Nic Com ===
Succes Nic Com is a retail company founded in Gorj in 1994. Its 2011 turnover amounted to 65 million euros. In 2013, it operated 200 stores of the proximity and supermarket types, plus a single hypermarket, employing a total of over 1,000 people. In 2014, it was the 10th largest food retailer in Romania, with a turnover of 75 million euros, although this was slightly less than its 2013 turnover of 80 million euros. The company filed for bankruptcy in early 2015, losing half its revenue by 2017.

== Tourism ==
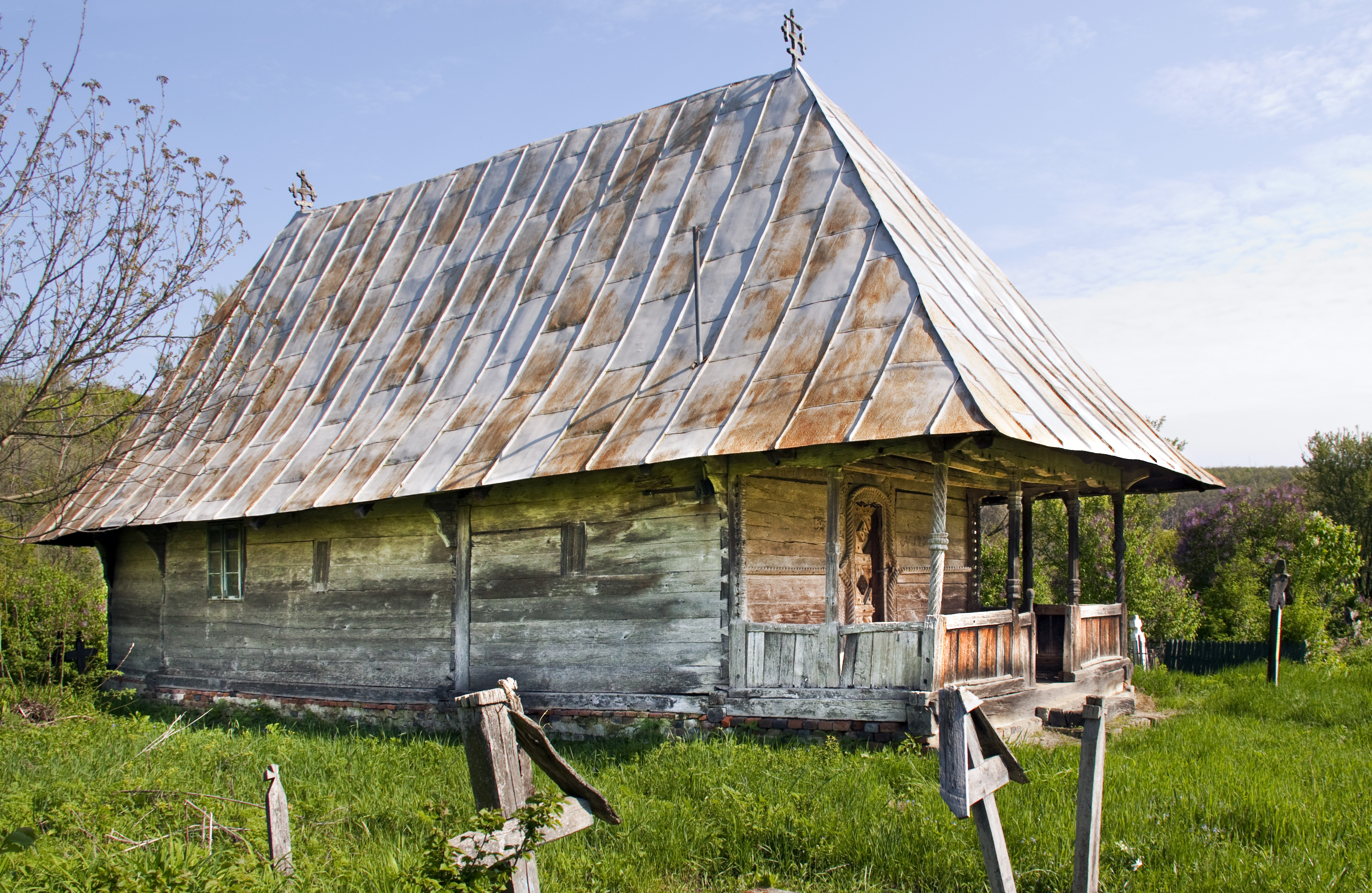
Wooden church in Slăvuța, Gorj County

The main tourist destinations are:

- The city and the area around Târgu Jiu:
  - The Constantin Brâncuși sculptural ensemble;
  - Tismana Monastery.
- The Parâng Mountains.
- Polovragi Monastery.

== Politics ==
The Gorj County Council, renewed at the 2024 local elections, consists of 30 counsellors, with the following party composition:

Party	Seats	Current County Council
Social Democratic Party (PSD)	16	
National Liberal Party (PNL)	9	
Alliance for the Union of Romanians (AUR)	5	

== Administrative divisions ==
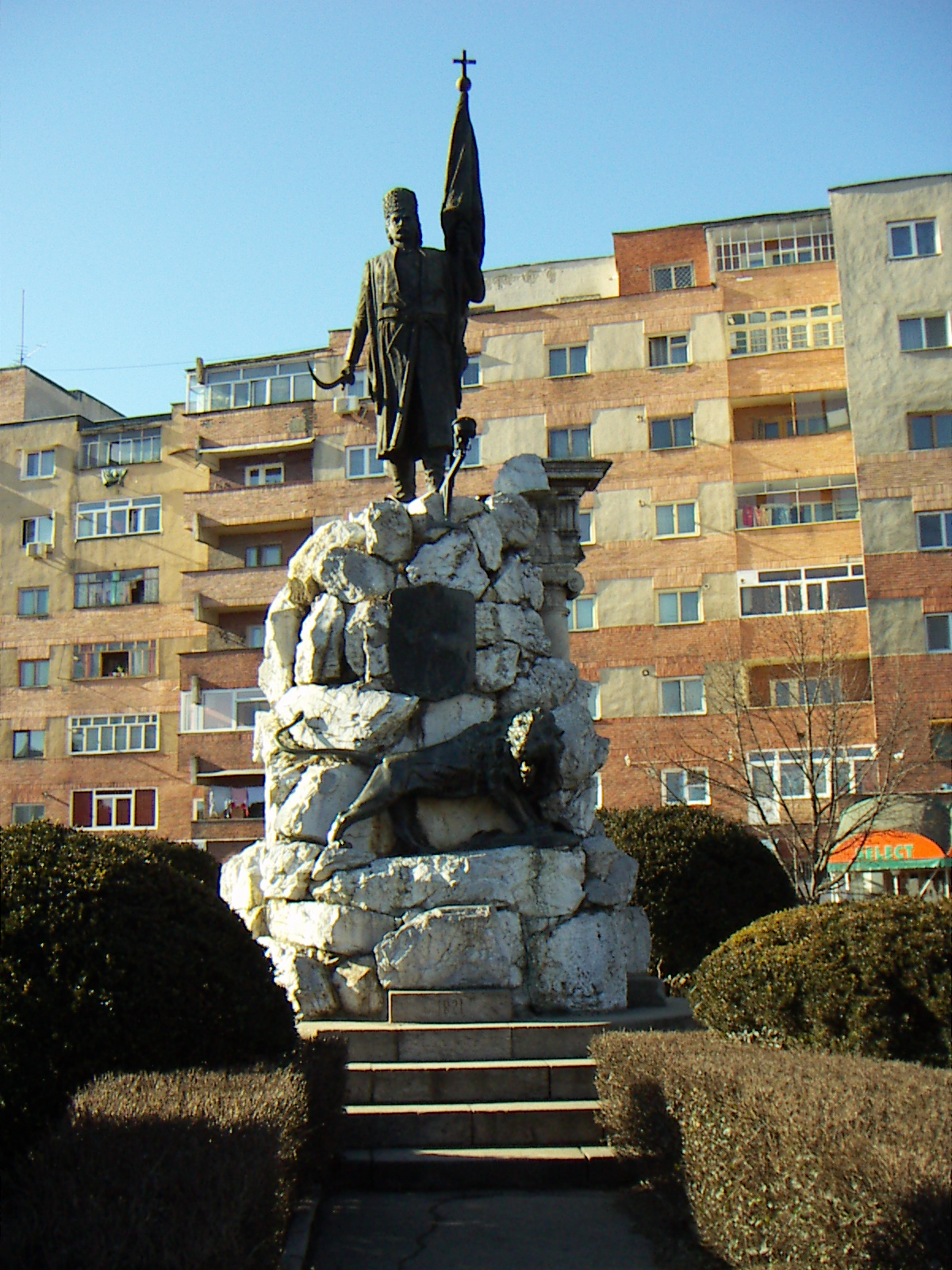
Tudor Vladimirescu monument in Târgu Jiu

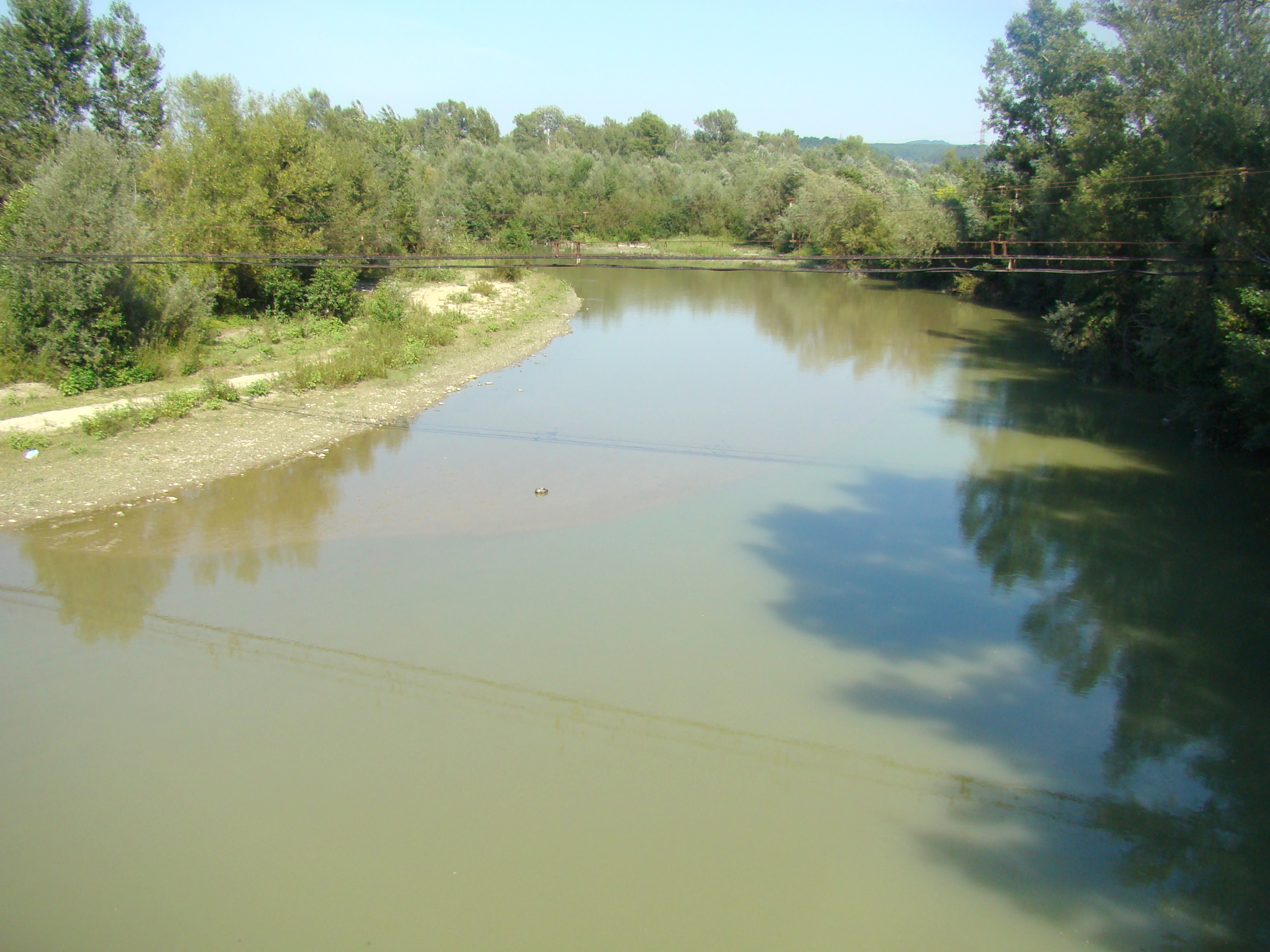
Gilort river in Târgu Cărbunești

Gorj County has 2 municipalities, 7 towns and 61 communes

- Municipalities
  - Motru- population: 15,950 (as of 2021)
  - Târgu Jiu – capital city; population: 73,545 (as of 2021)
- Towns
  - Bumbești-Jiu
  - Novaci
  - Rovinari
  - Târgu Cărbunești
  - Țicleni
  - Tismana
  - Turceni
- Communes
  - Albeni
  - Alimpești
  - Aninoasa
  - Arcani
  - Baia de Fier
  - Bălănești
  - Bălești
  - Bărbătești
  - Bengești-Ciocadia
  - Berlești
  - Bâlteni
  - Bolboși
  - Borăscu
  - Brănești
  - Bumbești-Pițic
  - Bustuchin
  - Câlnic
  - Căpreni
  - Cătunele
  - Ciuperceni
  - Crasna
  - Crușeț
  - Dănciulești
  - Dănești
  - Drăgotești
  - Drăguțești
  - Fărcășești
  - Glogova
  - Godinești
  - Hurezani
  - Ionești
  - Jupânești
  - Lelești
  - Licurici
  - Logrești
  - Mătăsari
  - Mușetești
  - Negomir
  - Padeș
  - Peștișani
  - Plopșoru
  - Polovragi
  - Prigoria
  - Roșia de Amaradia
  - Runcu
  - Săcelu
  - Samarinești
  - Săulești
  - Schela
  - Scoarța
  - Slivilești
  - Stănești
  - Stejari
  - Stoina
  - Țânțăreni
  - Telești
  - Turburea
  - Turcinești
  - Urdari
  - Văgiulești
  - Vladimir

== Historical county ==
Județul Gorj
- County (Județ)
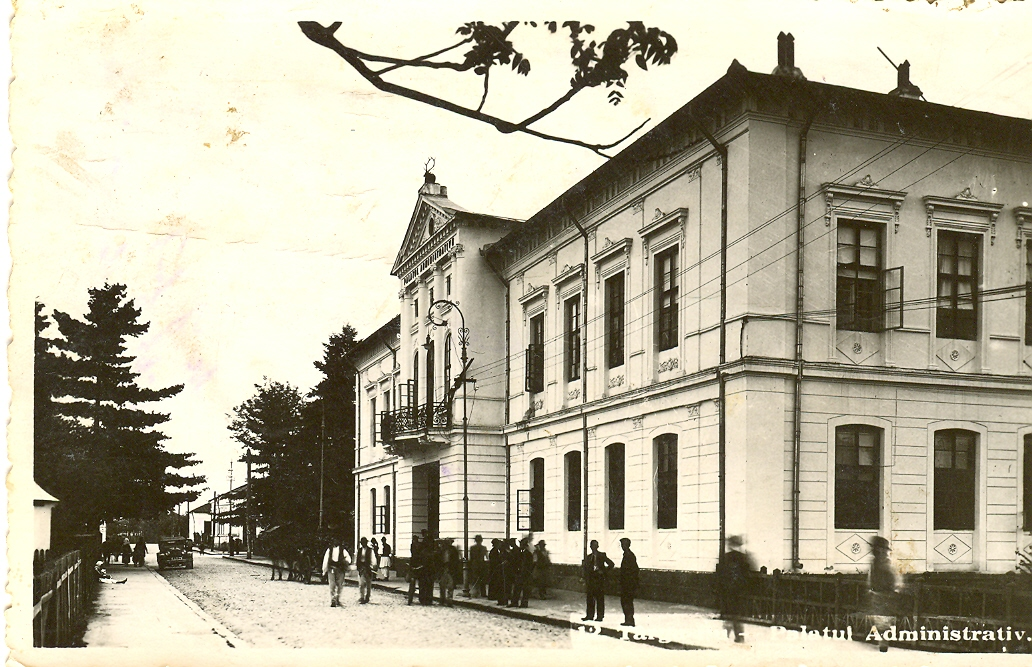
- The Gorj County Prefecture building of the interwar period.

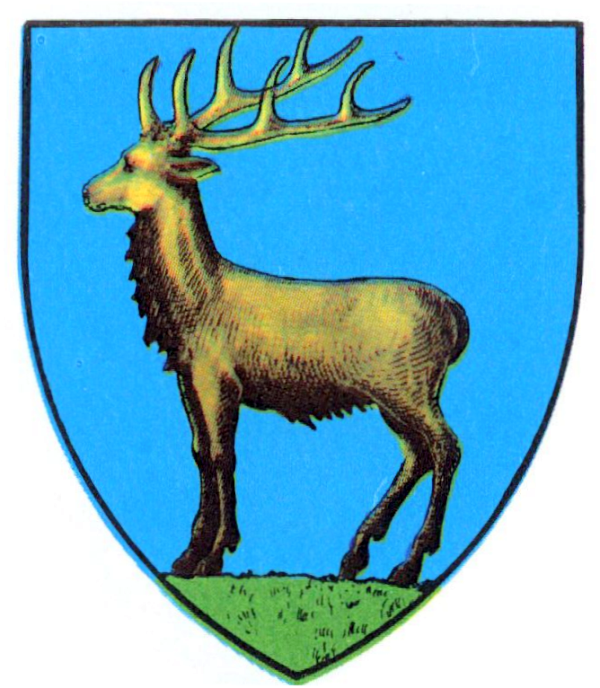
- Coat of arms

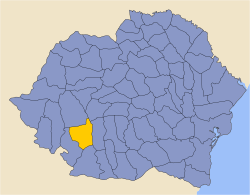
- Country: Romania
- Historic region: Oltenia
- Capital city (Reședință de județ): Târgu Jiu

Area
  - Total: 4,579 km^{2} (1,768 sq mi)

Population (1930)
  - Total: 206,339
  - Density: 45.06/km^{2} (116.7/sq mi)
- Time zone: UTC+2 (EET)
  - Summer (DST): UTC+3 (EEST)

Historically, the county was located in the southwestern part of Greater Romania, in the northern part of the historical region of Oltenia. Its capital was Târgu Jiu. The interwar county territory comprised a large part of the current Gorj County.

It was bordered to the west by Mehedinți County, to the north by the counties of Hunedoara and Sibiu, to the east by Vâlcea County, and to the south by Dolj County.

=== Administration ===
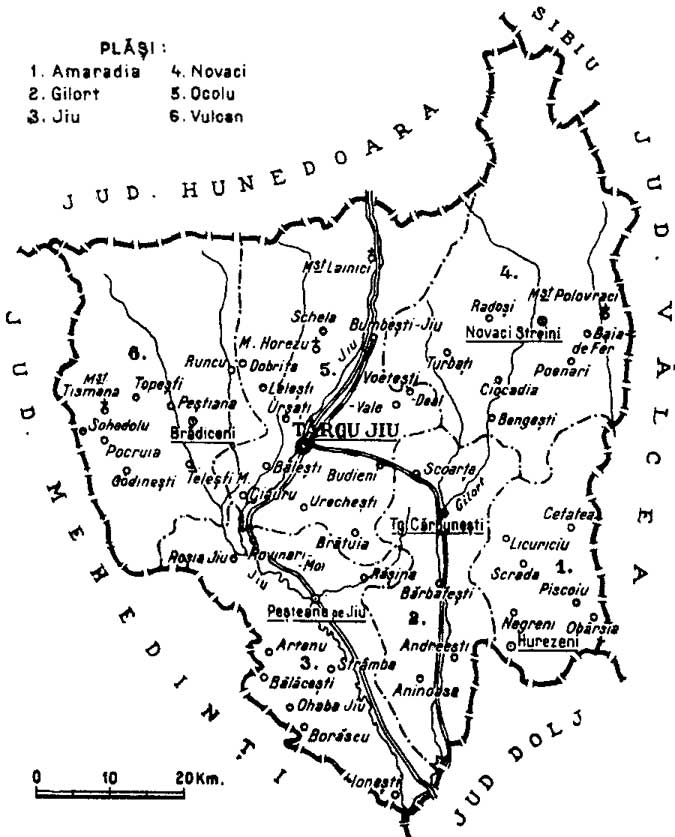
Map of Gorj County as constituted in 1938.

The county was originally divided into four administrative districts (plăși):

1. Plasa Gilort, headquartered at Gilort
2. Plasa Jiu, headquartered at Jiu
3. Plasa Novaci, headquartered at Novaci
4. Plasa Vulcana, headquartered at Vulcana

Subsequently, two more districts were established:

5. Plasa Amaradia, headquartered at Amaradia
6. Plasa Ocolu, headquartered at Ocolul

=== Population ===
According to the 1930 census data, the county population was 206,339 inhabitants, ethnically divided as follows: 97.9% Romanians, 1.7% Romanies, as well as other minorities. From the religious point of view, the population was 99.6% Eastern Orthodox, as well as other minorities.

==== Urban population ====
In 1930, the county's urban population was 13,030 inhabitants, comprising 90.0% Romanians, 4.6% Romanies, 1.1% Germans, 0.9% Hungarians, 0.8% Jews, as well as other minorities. From the religious point of view, the urban population was composed of 95.8% Eastern Orthodox, 2.2% Roman Catholic, 0.8% Jewish, as well as other minorities.

=== Industry ===
In the county capital of Târgu Jiu, there was a factory producing roof tiles as of 1931.
