= List of Romanian Orthodox monasteries =

A list of Romanian Orthodox monasteries, predominantly located in present-day Romania.

== Argeș County ==
- Curtea de Argeș Monastery
- Nămăești Monastery
- Negru Vodă Monastery
- Trivale Monastery

== Bucharest ==
- Antim Monastery
- Cașin Monastery
- Christiana Monastery
- Mihai Vodă Monastery
- Radu Vodă Monastery
- Stavropoleos Monastery

== Dâmbovița County ==
- Bâldana Monastery
- Bunea Monastery
- Cobia Monastery
- Dealu Monastery
- Doicești Monastery
- Nucet Monastery
- Pătroaia Deal Monastery
- Peștera Ialomicioarei Monastery
- Săcuieni Monastery
- Stelea Monastery
- Viforâta Monastery

== Ilfov County ==
- Căldărușani Monastery
- Cernica Monastery
- Pasărea Monastery
- Sămurcășești Monastery
- Sitaru Monastery
- Snagov Monastery

== Maramureș County ==
- Săpânța-Peri Monastery
- Oarța de Sus Monastery

== Neamț County ==
- Agapia Monastery
- Văratec Monastery
- Neamț Monastery

== Suceava County ==
- Bogdana Monastery
- Dragomirna
- Humor Monastery
- Moldovița Monastery
- Putna Monastery
- Sucevița Monastery
- Voroneț Monastery

== Unsorted ==
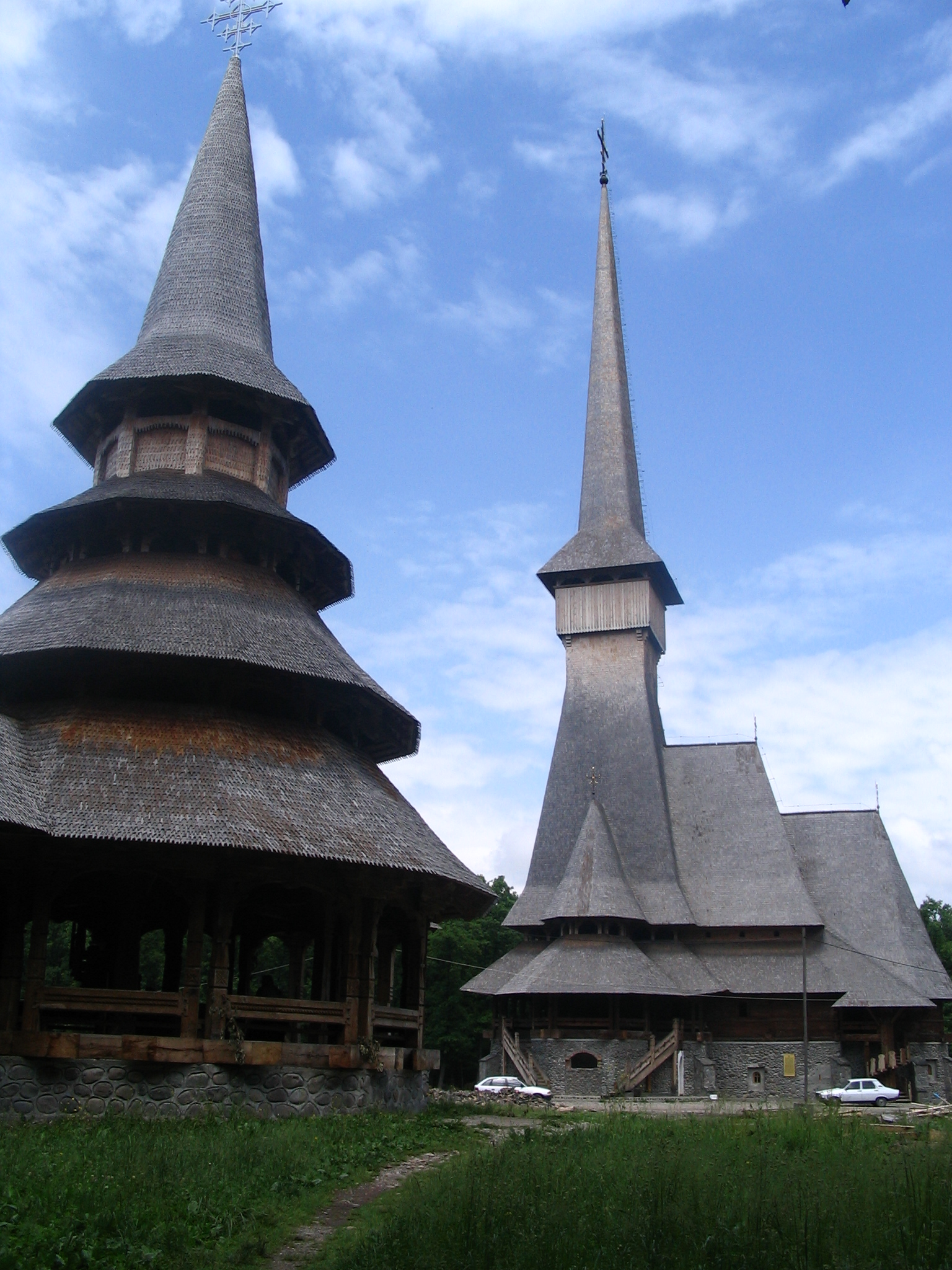
Bârsana Monastery, northern Romania.

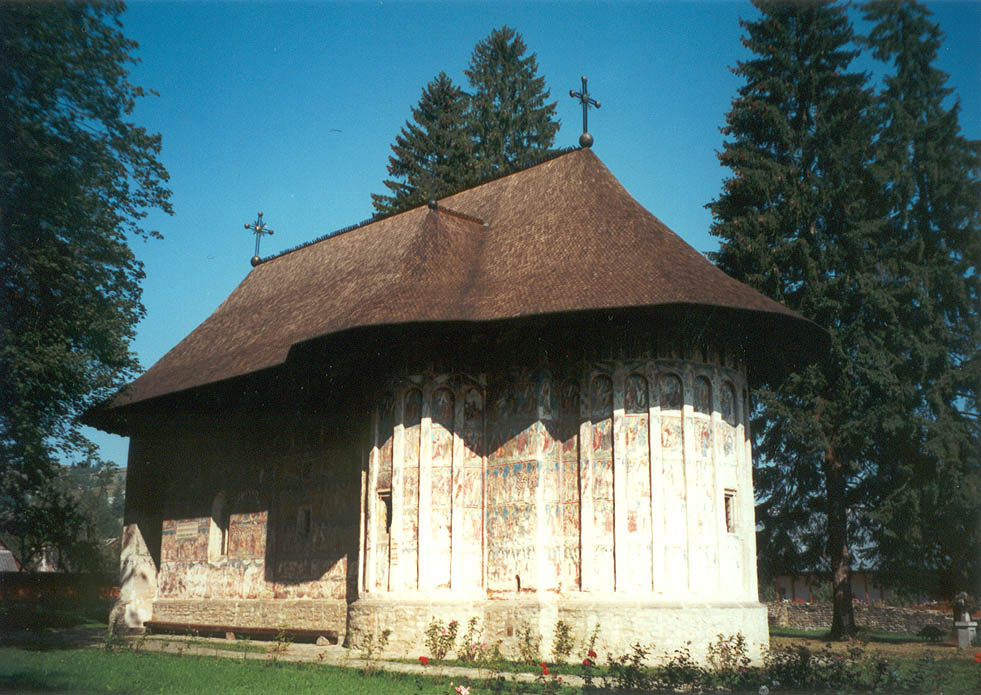
Humor Monastery

- Adam Monastery
- Afteia Monastery
- Agafton Monastery
- Aninoasa Monastery
- Arbore Monastery
- Arnota Monastery
- Baia de Aramă Monastery
- Bănceni Monastery
- Bârnova Monastery
- Bârsana Monastery
- Bistrița Monastery
- Bixad Monastery
- Brâncoveni Monastery
- Brebu Monastery
- Bujoreni Monastery
- Călugăra Monastery
- Caraiman Monastery
- Celic Dere Monastery
- Cetățuia Monastery
- Cheia Monastery
- Ciolanu Monastery
- Clocociov Monastery
- Cocoș Monastery
- Comana Monastery
- Coșlogeni Monastery
- Cozia Monastery
- Crasna Monastery
- Curtea de Argeș Monastery
- Dălhauți Monastery
- Dealu Mare Monastery
- Dervent Monastery
- Diaconesti Monastery
- Dintr-un Lemn Monastery
- Dobrovăț Monastery
- Dumbrava Monastery
- Duminica Sfintilor Romani Monastery
- Edenu Monastery
- Frăsinei Monastery
- Frumoasa Monastery
- Galata Monastery
- Ghighiu Monastery
- Giurgeni Monastery
- Glavacioc Monastery
- Golia Monastery
- Govora Monastery
- Hadâmbu Monastery
- Hagigadar Monastery
- Halmyris Monastery
- Hodoș Bodrog Monastery
- Horaița Monastery
- Horezu Monastery
- Izbuc Monastery
- Jercălăi Monastery (a.k.a. Schitul Sfânta Maria-Cricov)
- Lainici Monastery
- Moisei Monastery
- Negru Voda Monastery
- Nera Monastery
- Nicula Monastery
- Oașa Monastery
- Pângarați Monastery
- Petru Vodă Monastery
- Piatra Scrisă Monastery
- Pissiota Monastery
- Plăviceni Monastery
- Plumbuita Monastery
- Poiana Mărului Monastery
- Polovragi Monastery
- Ponor Monastery
- Predeal Monastery
- Prislop Monastery
- Probota Monastery
- Prodromos (Mount Athos) (Ecumenical Patriarchate of Constantinople)
- Râmeț Monastery
- Rarău Monastery
- Râșca Monastery
- Rătești Monastery
- Recea Monastery
- Robaia Monastery
- Rohia Monastery
- Sădinca Monastery
- Sâmbăta de Sus Monastery
- Saon Monastery
- Săraca Monastery
- Secu Monastery
- Sfânta Treime Monastery
- Sihăstria Monastery
- Sihla Monastery
- Sinaia Monastery
- Slătioara Monastery
- Stânișoara Monastery
- Strâmba Monastery
- Surpatele Monastery
- Suzana Monastery
- Tanacu Monastery
- Tismana Monastery
- Trei Ierarhi Monastery
- Turnu Monastery
- Tutana Monastery
- Valea Mănăstirii Monastery
- Văratec Monastery
- Vărzărești Monastery
- Viforâta Monastery
- Vișina Monastery
- Vlădiceni Monastery
- Vladimiresti Monastery
- Zamfira Monastery
- Zosin Monastery

== See also ==
- Romanian Orthodox monasteries
