= Victor Popescu =

WWI hero

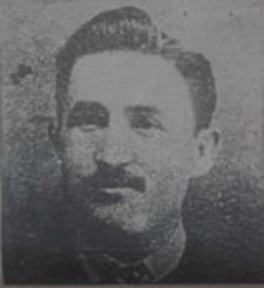
- Born: September 21, 1886; Valea cu Apă, Gorj County, Kingdom of Romania
- Died: January 1, 1970 (aged 83); Valea cu Apă, Socialist Republic of Romania
- Occupation: School teacher
- Known for: Partisan during the German occupation of Oltenia in World War I
- Military career
- Allegiance: Kingdom of Romania
- Branch: Romanian Land Forces
- Service years: 1916–1918
- Rank: Second lieutenant
- Conflicts: World War I; Romanian Campaign; Battle of Transylvania; Second Battle of the Jiu Valley

Victor Popescu (21 September 1886 – 1 January 1970) was an officer in the Romanian Army and a guerrilla warrior during the occupation of Romania by the Central Powers in World War I.

== Early life ==
He was born in Valea cu Apă village, part of Fărcășești commune, Gorj County, the son of school teacher Dumitru Popescu. He attended the Normal School in Bucharest to become a teacher himself. After completing his studies he performed military service in the 18th Infantry Regiment Gorj, then returned to Valea cu Apă where he took his father's position.

== Participation in World War I ==
At the beginning of 1916, Popescu was concentrated in the army and followed a training course at the 21st Dorobanți Regiment in Bucharest. At the day Romania entered World War I on August 15, 1916, he was enlisted in the 18th Infantry Regiment under the command of Colonel Constantin Jipa. He commanded, at the rank of second lieutenant, platoon 3, of the third company of battalion I of this regiment. With his unit he participated in the Battle of Transylvania in 1916, fighting in the Jiu Valley. He was wounded while fighting north of the city of Lupeni. After recovering, he returned to the command of his platoon.

On 5 November 1916, near Țicleni, most of the 18th Infantry Regiment, together with other Romanian regiments, was surrounded by German forces and forced to surrender. Not wanting to fall prisoner, Popescu fled in the forests, trying to reach the Romanian troops he was separated from. He urged his soldiers to do the same in order to avoid capture and internment in prison camps.

Together with his company commander, Captain Gheorghe Gutuleanu, and with sergeant Costea Aristica, he wandered for three days through the forests between Rășina and Brătuia, to Vlăduleni village, where the three separated. Popescu tried to reach a Romanian detachment that he knew was withdrawing towards Turnu-Severin, but failed to find it, so he returned to his native village.

== Formation of the guerrilla group ==
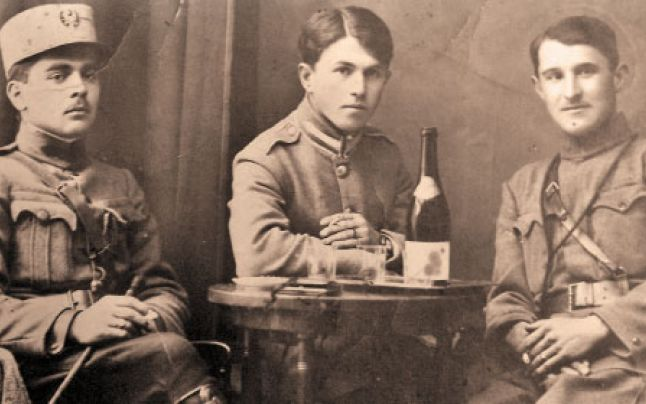
Ionel Popescu, World War I Romanian partisan (middle) with two friends while in Budapest in 1918

When he arrived home, he found out that the Germans had plundered his home and tortured his father. On December 4, 1916 he killed the two responsible German soldiers, then killed the German sentinel at the headquarters of the German patrol, taking his gun and ammunition. From this point on, Popescu decided to become a guerrilla warrior to oppose the German occupant. He set up partisan units directly modeled on Tudor Vladimirescu's Panduri from the Wallachian uprising of 1821.

From the people in the village, he learned that his former company commander, captain Gutuleanu, was captured by the Germans and sent to the Sopronnyék prison camp in Austria-Hungary. He also learned that a local blacksmith named Hans, and villager Gheorghe Schism, were betraying him to the Germans. In response, Popescu began to assemble a partisan group to fight the Germans, within the areas of Gorj and Mehedinți counties. His comrades were brothers Dumitru and Ilie Cârciumaru, Iorgu Crăciun, Vasile Velican, M. Cărămidaru, all from Negomir, Nicolae Popescu, Tudor Popescu from Valea cu Apă, Gheorghe Ioana from Racovița, sergeant gendarme, Gheorghe Spătaru, from Negomir village, Ionel Popescu normalist and scout student, Ionel Prunescu, a student at the military school in Craiova, as well as escaped prisoners of war from the prisoners' camp in Turnu-Severin, Italians Alfredo Pellegrini and Dominico Prade, and some Russian POWs that had escaped.

The number of those who joined him in the first phase of the guerrilla battle was between forty and one hundred and twenty combatants. The number of members of the group varied over time, increasing in the case of attacks, and declining when the enemy started to follow the partisans. The combatants were dressed in Romanian military or civilian uniforms, while the former Russian and Italian prisoners wore the uniforms as when they were captured by the Germans. As weapons they had rifles and machine guns leftover by the Romanian Army during the retreat or captured weapons taken from the Central Powers troops.

== The actions of the guerrilla group ==
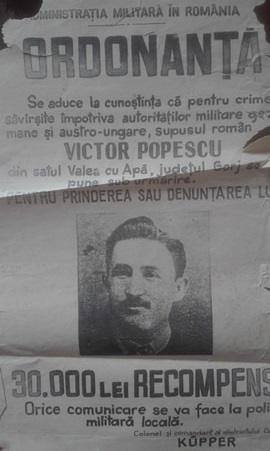
Wanted poster of Victor Popescu

In order to mislead the enemy, during incursions made in the villages of Gorj and Mehedinți counties, Popescu's group of partisans left leaflets addressed to the occupation forces, with the following content: "Today I passed through your village, I saw the miseries that you do to our brethren, we will soon pay you miserable what you are." Tickets were signed with the names of senior Romanian officers, including General Alexandru Averescu, to suggest to the Germans that they are confronted with a large and well-organized Romanian force.

The actions of the guerrilla group were diverse, ranging from assault with firearms to spreading manifestations that would mislead the opponents or intimidate them. On several occasions, in the villages of Corcova and Meriș, Popescu, disguised as a monk, spoke to the German patrols, got them drunk, and took their weapons and ammunition while they were unconscious of had too much to drink. Besides, the Romanian sub-lieutenant walked through villages disguised in various forms: priest, carriage, pot-seller and others.

In May 1917, Popescu launched a Proclamation addressed to Romanians, village mayors, and Romanian soldiers remaining behind the enemy front, urging them to fight with their guns and warning the Romanian traitors that they would be punished if they would give information to the enemy.

The Central Powers' occupation forces organized guerrilla arrests, mostly based on information provided by Romanian traitors. A reward was placed on Popescu's head, amounting to 5,000 to 30,000 lei, depending on the value of the information that will lead to his capture. The enemy's injuries were mostly with no results, he suffered losses as a result of clashes with Romanian partisans. In some of these raids, the German patrols were able to capture the two former Italian prisoners who fought alongside Popescu, Pellegrini and Prade. In others, they succeeded in killing some Romanian fighters, such as Ionel Prunescu and Gheorghe Ioana. Popescu himself would be hurt in one of these struggles, but he was able to save himself without being captured.

Among those who betrayed the group of Romanian partisans were Gheorghe Schînteie, mayor of Drăgotești commune, Gheorghe Roșoga, priest in the village of Peșteana de Jos and Aftanghel Toma, monk. Schînteie would be shot dead by Popescu as he led a Hungarian patrol to catch him. Toma betrayed Ionel Popescu, a member of the group of partisans, who was captured by Austro-Hungarian troops close to the Raci village. Victor Popescu attacked the command and freed Ionel. A commando made up of partisans abducted the monk on the night of May 30/31, 1917 and after an interrogation he was executed by shooting, leaving a note near his dead body with the text: "so will all who betray their brethren and stand in the service of the enemy."

Other actions of the partisans included attacking enemy ammunition depots, blowing up a train loaded with ammunition, and attacks on the Central Powers' troops, including those stationed the city of Târgu Jiu.

Because they were not able to catch them even by betrayal, the military authorities of the occupation forces resorted to reprisals on the families of the guerrilla warriors. Victor Popescu's father, wife, sister, and father-in-law were arrested, sentenced to death, and some of them executed by the enemy. Popescu's house, in the village of Valea cu Apă, was spoiled and burnt on 24 June 1917, on the order of General von Knalzer. The house of Popescu's father-in-law, N.D. Pleșan from the village of Șișești, Mehedinți, was also robbed and burnt.

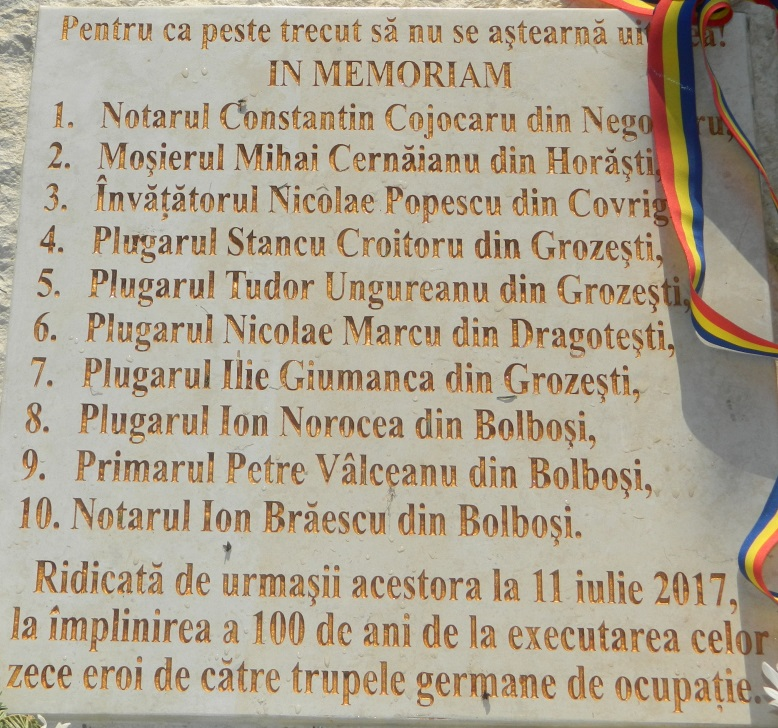
Plaque with the names of World War I hostages executed by the Germans at Turnu-Severin prison on July 10, 1917.

From the villages of Valea cu Apă, Negomir, Grozești, Covrigi, Peștera de Sus, Bolboși, Slivilești, Stejerei, Rovinari, Horăști, Samarinești, Trestioara, and others, hundreds of people were suspected of helping the partisans. They were locked at Turnu-Severin, and ten of them were sentenced to death. Learning about the death sentences for the people who had helped him, Popescu decided to attack the Turnu Severin Prison to release the detainees who supported him. The partisan group attacked the prison on the night of July 6/7, 1917 and managed to break into its walls, whereby some of the prisoners managed to flee. Those sentenced to death, however, did not escape, and the attack on the prison hastened their execution by the Germans. On July 10, 1917, ten supporters of Victor Popescu were executed by firing squad after being forced to dig their own graves. These were Nicolae Marcu from Drăgotești, Nicolae Popescu, teacher from Covrigi, brother of Victor and father of Ionel Popescu, Constantin Cojocaru, notary in Negomir commune, Ion Norocea from Bolboși, Petre Vâlceanu and Ion Brăiescu, mayor and notary of Bolboși commune, Stancu Croitoru, Tudor Ungureanu, Ilie Giumanca, all from Grozești, and Mihai Cernăianu from Horăști.

Another eight people, both men and women, were sentenced to imprisonment, with penalties ranging from one to fifteen years. Several other dozens of people were imprisoned at the Tismana Monastery, and ten were deported to Bulgaria. Either in prison or shortly after being released from detention, some died due to ill-treatment. Among them are the father of Victor Popescu, Dumitru, and the sister-in-law, Domnica, the wife of Nicolae Popescu, executed by the Germans on July 10, 1917.

In August 1917, the group of partisans dissolved, and most returned to their homes. Victor Popescu moved to the counties of Olt and Vâlcea, gathered a new group of five or six people, who went to Moldavia. In February 1918 Popescu joined his regiment stationed there.

== After World War I ==
At the end of 1918, when the war ended, he returned to his native village where he resumed his teaching career. In 1941 he was decorated with the "Reward of Labor" medal for outstanding merits as a teacher, reviewer and school inspector. He retired in 1943.

In 1948 he was fined for "propaganda against the regime" by the newly established communist authorities. The one who denounced him to the authorities was the same priest, Gheorghe Roșoga, who in 1917 sold him to the Germans. In 1952, Popescu was arrested by the Securitate and was detained for one year at the Ghencea camp in Bucharest. The communist authorities annulled his pension entitlement for the period 1948-1956, on the grounds that he had been punished under Decree 102 of 1948. His pension was reinstated in 1956. He died in 1970 at the age of 84, being buried in the cemetery of native village.

The 1986 historical film Bătălia din umbră, directed by Andrei Blaier, with Dan Condurache in the leading role was based on Popescu's guerrilla actions during the First World War. In 1996, the school in Valea cu Apă was named "Victor Popescu" in his memory.
