= Jilț =

- Location within Romania

Location
- Country: Romania
- Counties: Gorj County
- Villages: Mătăsari, Drăgotești, Bolboși

Physical characteristics
- Mouth: Jiu
  - coordinates: 44.6830°N 23.4034°E
- Length: 49 km (30 mi)
- Basin size: 377 km^{2} (146 sq mi)

Basin features
- Progression: Jiu→ Danube→ Black Sea

The Jilț is a right tributary of the river Jiu in Romania. It discharges into the Jiu in Turceni. Its length is 49 km (30 mi) and its basin size is 377 km^{2} (146 sq mi).

== Tributaries ==
The following rivers are tributaries to the river Jilț (from source to mouth):

- Left: Valea Racilor
- Right: Valea lui Voicu, Jilțul Slivilești, Jilțul Mic, Borăscu
