= Negomir =

- Commune
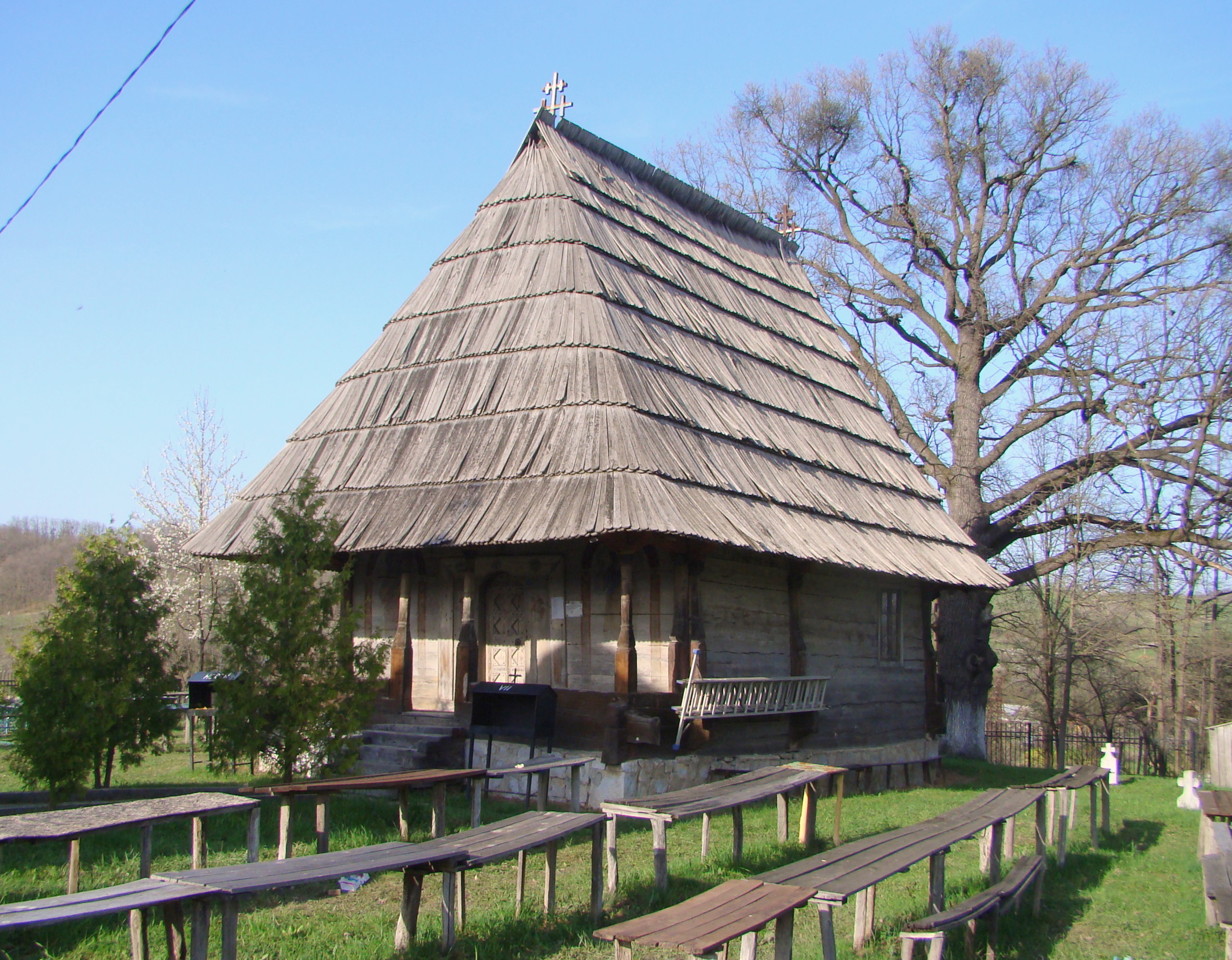
- Saint Nicholas wooden church in Negomir

- Location in Romania
- Coordinates: 44°50′N 23°10′E
- Country: Romania
- County: Gorj
- Subdivisions: Artanu, Bohorel, Condeiești, Negomir, Nucetu, Orzu, Paltinu, Raci, Ursoaia, Valea Racilor

Government
  - Mayor (2020–2024): Tudor Oiță (PSD)
- Area: 53.51 km^{2} (20.66 sq mi)
- Elevation: 225 m (738 ft)
- Population (2021-12-01): 3,370
  - Density: 63.0/km^{2} (163/sq mi)
- Time zone: UTC+02:00 (EET)
  - Summer (DST): UTC+03:00 (EEST)
- Postal code: 217310
- Area code: +(40) 253
- Vehicle reg.: GJ
- Website: www.comunanegomir.ro

Negomir is a commune in Gorj County, Oltenia, Romania. It is composed of ten villages: Artanu, Bohorel, Condeiești, Negomir, Nucetu, Orzu, Paltinu, Raci, Ursoaia, and Valea Racilor.

The commune lies on the Getic Plateau, at an altitude of 225 m (738 ft), on the banks of the river Jilțul Mic. It is located in the southwestern part of Gorj County, 25 km (16 mi) east of the city of Motru and 33 km (21 mi) southwest of the county seat, Târgu Jiu. Negomir borders the following localities: Fărcășești commune to the north and east; Urdari commune and the town of Turceni to the east; Borăscu commune to the south; Mătăsari commune to the north-west; and Drăgotești and Bolboși communes to the west.
