= Negomiru =

Negomiru may refer to:

- Negomiru River, a tributary of the Jilţ River in Romania
- Negomir, a commune in Gorj County, Romania
