= Borăscu (disambiguation) =

Borăscu may refer to the following places in Romania:

- Borăscu, a commune in Gorj County
- Borăscu (Jilț), a tributary of the Jilț in Gorj County
- Borăscu, a tributary of the Lăpușnicul Mic in Hunedoara County
