= Cojmănești =

- Location within Romania

Location
- Country: Romania
- Counties: Gorj County
- Villages: Cojmănești

Physical characteristics
- Mouth: Jilțul Slivilești
  - coordinates: 44.7717°N 23.1401°E
- Length: 11 km (6.8 mi)
- Basin size: 38 km^{2} (15 sq mi)

Basin features
- Progression: Jilțul Slivilești→ Jilț→ Jiu→ Danube→ Black Sea
- Tributaries
  - right: Tehomir
- River code: VII.1.33.2.1

The Cojmănești is a left tributary of the river Jilțul Slivilești in Romania. It flows into the Jilțul Slivilești in Slivilești. Its length is 11 km (6.8 mi) and its basin size is 38 km^{2} (15 sq mi).
