= Valea Racilor =

Valea Racilor may refer to the following places in Romania:

- Valea Racilor, a village in the commune Negomir, Gorj County
- Valea Racilor (Arieș), a tributary of the Arieș in the Apuseni Mountains, Cluj County
- Valea Racilor (Jilț), a tributary of the Jilț in Gorj County
