= Jilțul Slivilești =

- Location within Romania

Location
- Country: Romania
- Counties: Gorj County
- Villages: Băzăvani, Slivilești, Șiacu

Physical characteristics
- Mouth: Jilț
  - coordinates: 44.7621°N 23.1934°E
- Length: 14 km (8.7 mi)
- Basin size: 82 km^{2} (32 sq mi)

Basin features
- Progression: Jilț→ Jiu→ Danube→ Black Sea
- Tributaries
  - left: Cojmănești
- River code: VII.1.33.2

The Jilțul Slivilești is a right tributary of the river Jilț in Romania. It flows into the Jilț near Șiacu. Its length is 14 km (8.7 mi) and its basin size is 82 km^{2} (32 sq mi).
