= Drăgotești =

Drăgotești may refer to several places in Romania:

- Drăgotești, Dolj, a commune in Dolj County
- Drăgotești, Gorj, a commune in Gorj County
- Drăgotești, a village in Prunișor Commune, Mehedinți County
