= Zorleni =

- Commune
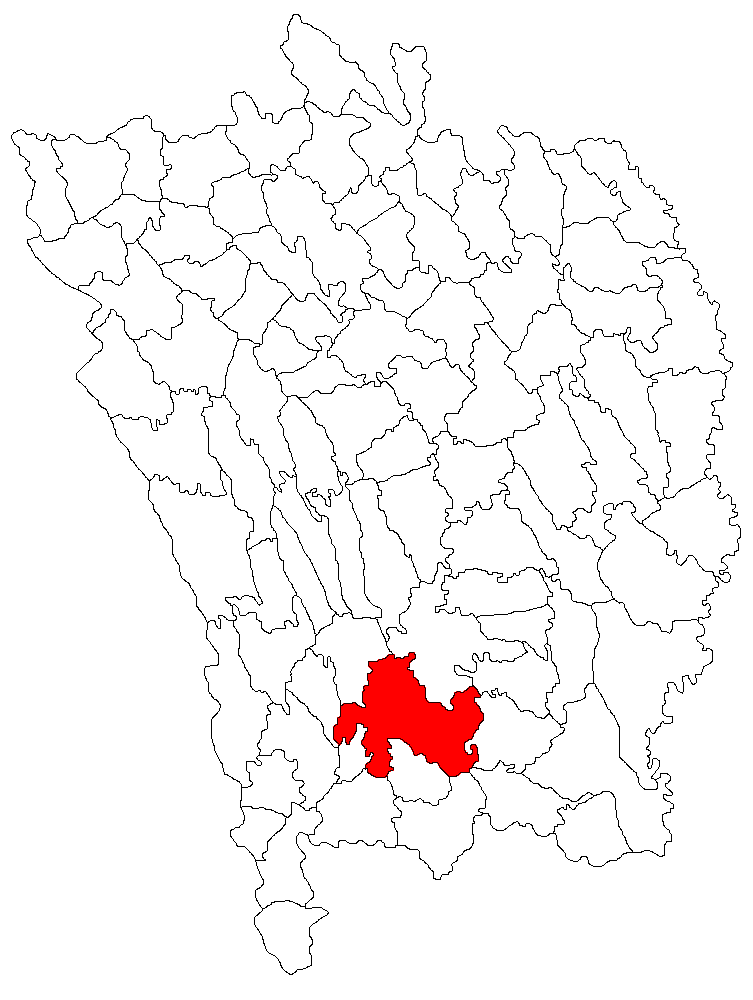
- Location in Vaslui County

- Location in Romania
- Coordinates: 46°16′N 27°43′E
- Country: Romania
- County: Vaslui
- Subdivisions: Zorleni, Dealu Mare, Popeni, Simila

Government
  - Mayor (2024–2028): Paula-Denisane Hultoană (PSD)
- Area: 133.44 km^{2} (51.52 sq mi)
- Elevation: 73 m (240 ft)
- Population (2021-12-01): 8,804
  - Density: 66/km^{2} (170/sq mi)
- Time zone: EET/EEST (UTC+2/+3)
- Postal code: 737635
- Area code: +40 x35
- Vehicle reg.: VS
- Website: www.zorleni.ro

Zorleni is a commune in Vaslui County, Western Moldavia, Romania. It is composed of four villages: Dealu Mare, Popeni, Simila and Zorleni. Bujoreni Monastery is located within this commune, east of Zorleni.

== History ==
Zorleni was formed after June 2, 1602 when the publican Andrei Kiriac received as a gift from Irimia Vodă the place called Siliștea Zorileni to make a village there.
