= Scorușu =

Scoruşu may refer to several villages in Romania:

- Scoruşu, a village in Borăscu Commune, Gorj County
- Scoruşu, a village in Lăpușata Commune, Vâlcea County
