= Holy Trinity Monastery (Strâmba) =

Monastery in Gorj County, Romania

Coordinates: 44°45′13.94″N 23°17′59.23″E

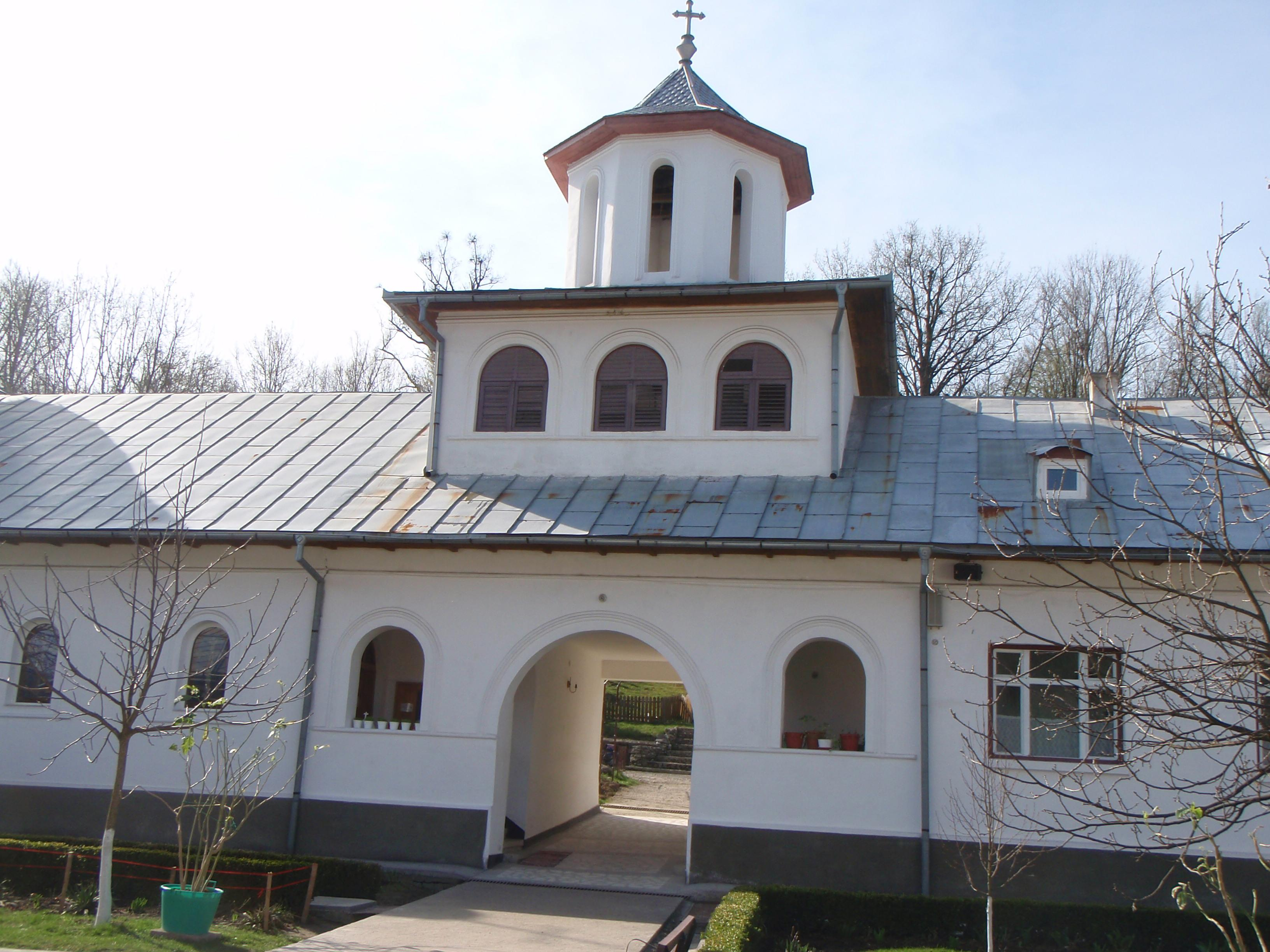

Religion
- Affiliation: Romanian Orthodox Church

Location
- Location: Strâmba-Jiu, Turceni, Gorj County, Romania
- Interactive map of Holy Trinity Monastery

Architecture
- Groundbreaking: 1597
- Materials: stone, brick

Holy Trinity Monastery (Romanian: Mănăstirea Sfânta Treime or Mănăstirea Strâmba) is a Romanian Orthodox monastery in Romania, located in Strâmba-Jiu village, Turceni town, Gorj County, Romania.

== Geography ==
The monastery is located at 9 km from Dealu Mare Monastery.

== Gallery ==
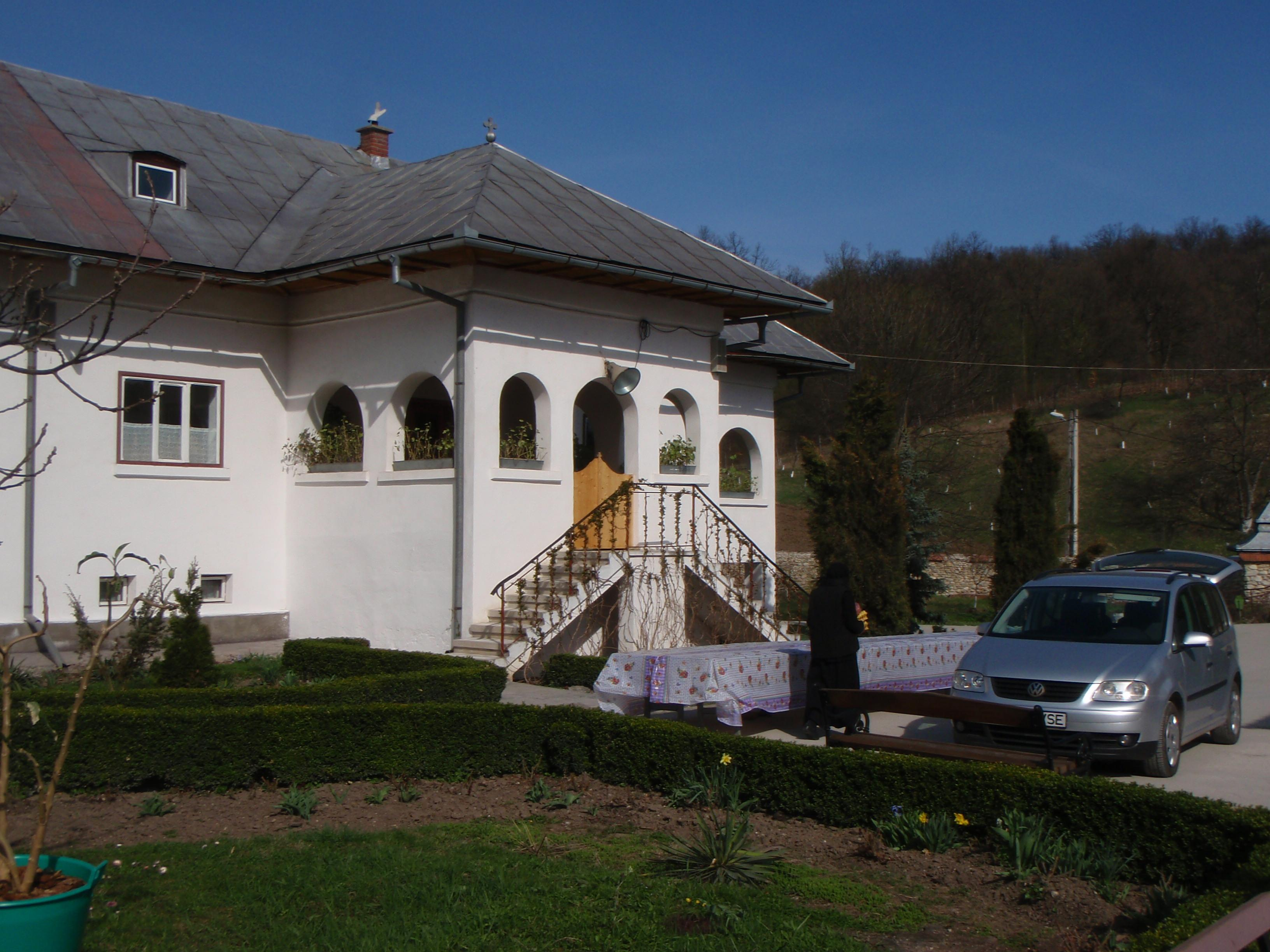
The yard

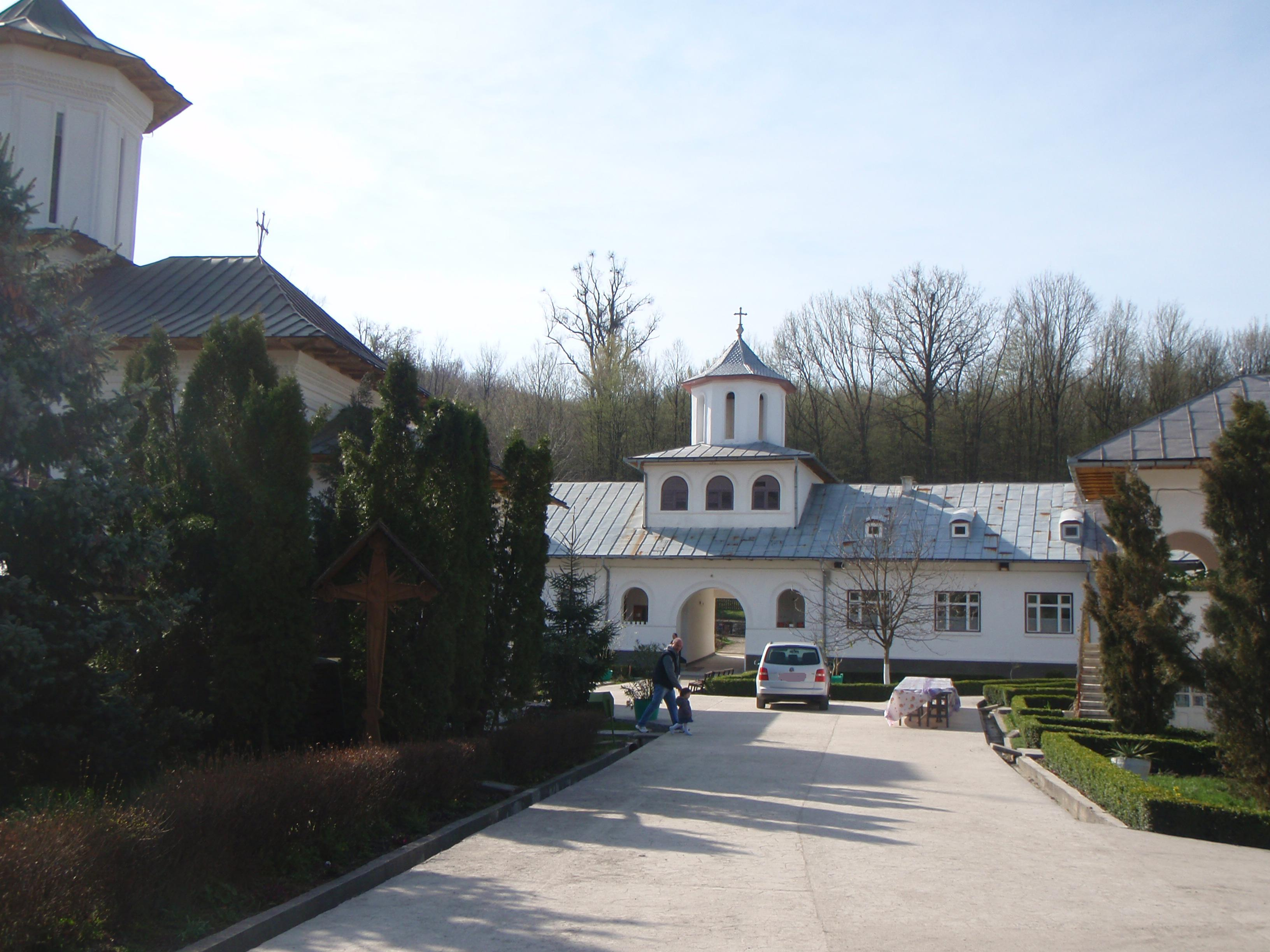
The yard

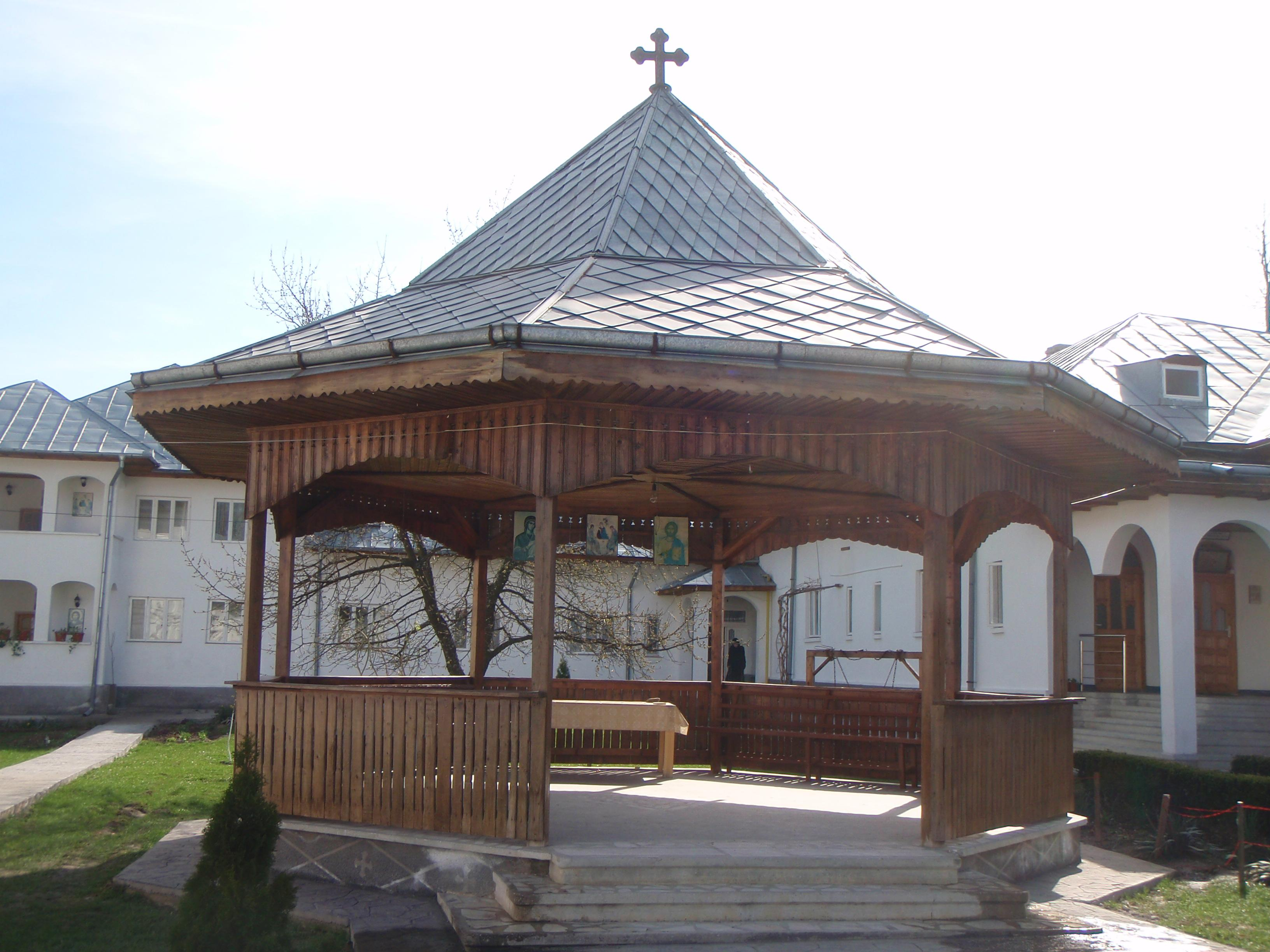
View

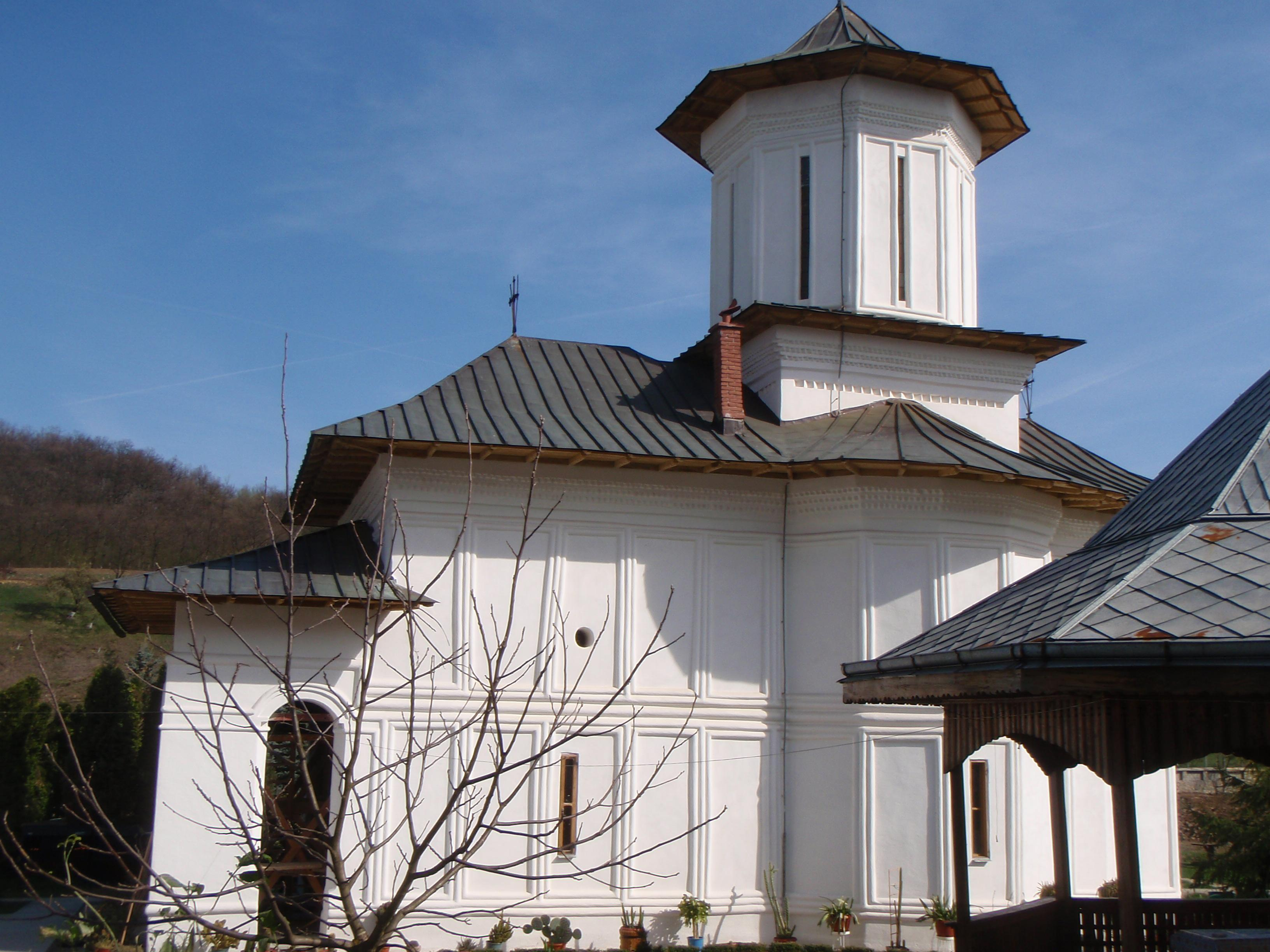
The church

== Bibliography ==
- Monografia istoricului gorjean Alexandru Ștefulescu: „Mănăstirea Strâmba”, Târgu Jiu, 1906, Editura Miloșescu.
