= Valea Racilor (Jilț) =

- Location within Romania

Location
- Country: Romania
- Counties: Gorj County
- Villages: Negomir, Ursoaia, Raci, Nucetu

Physical characteristics
- Mouth: Jilț
  - coordinates: 44.7139°N 23.2911°E
- Length: 26 km (16 mi)
- Basin size: 67 km^{2} (26 sq mi)

Basin features
- Progression: Jilț→ Jiu→ Danube→ Black Sea
- River code: VII.1.33.4

The Valea Racilor is a left tributary of the river Jilț in Romania. It flows into the Jilț near Baniu. Its length is 26 km (16 mi) and its basin size is 67 km^{2} (26 sq mi).
