= Ioan Carlaonț =

Romanian general

Ioan Carlaonț (19 October 1885 – 6 February 1952) was a Romanian major general, who led an anti-communist resistance movement in Oltenia after World War II. He was the older brother of General Dumitru Carlaonț.

He was born in Miculești, Gorj County. After attending the Artillery Military School in Bucharest (1904–1906), he fought in World War I. He then pursued his studies at the Higher War School (1919–1920), after which he was promoted to lieutenant colonel in 1920, and then to colonel in 1926. Carlaonț commanded the 38th Regiment from 1926 to 1928, the Special Artillery School from 1928 to 1933, and the 2nd Artillery Brigade from 1933 to 1937. He was promoted to brigadier general on 1 April 1935, commanding the Vth Corps from 1937 to 1939 and the 11th Infantry Division from 1939 to 1940. After being promoted to major general on 6 June 1940, he retired from active duty two months later.

After 1945, Carlaonț led the anti-communist National Resistance Movement in Oltenia. He was arrested in Târgu Jiu on 25 October 1948, and was condemned on 21 June 1949 by the Craiova Military Tribunal to 15 years imprisonment. He died at Aiud Prison on 6 February 1952, succumbing to tuberculosis.
