= Dumitru Carlaonț =

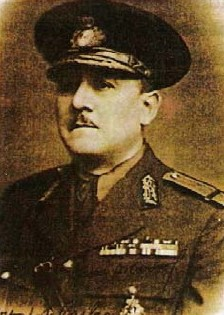
- General Dumitru Carlaonț
- Born: 28 October 1888; Miculești, Gorj County, Kingdom of Romania
- Died: 2 July 1970 (aged 81); Bucharest, Socialist Republic of Romania
- Education: Higher War School
- Military career
- Allegiance: Romania
- Branch: Land Forces
- Service years: 1908–1945
- Rank: major general
- Commands: 4th Infantry Division
- Conflicts: World War I World War II
- Awards: Order of Michael the Brave, 3rd class Order of the Crown (Romania), knight rank

Dumitru Carlaonț (28 October 1888 – 2 July 1970) was a Romanian major-general during World War II, who is known for being imprisoned and acquitted for war crimes three times. He was the younger brother of General Ioan Carlaonț.

Born in Miculești, Gorj County. After attending the Artillery Military School in Bucharest (1908–1910), he graduated with the rank of second lieutenant, advancing to lieutenant in 1913, and to captain in 1916. He commanded in World War I the 5th Artillery Regiment, fighting in the Romanian Campaign at the battles of the Jiu Valley and Dragoslavele. In 1917 he was promoted to major, and was awarded the Order of the Crown, knight rank. Subsequently, he fought in the Campaign of 1917, at the battles of Mărășești and Oituz. After the war, Carlaonț pursued his studies at the Higher War School (1919–1920), after which he was promoted to lieutenant colonel in 1927, to colonel in 1934, and to brigadier general in 1939.

From May 30 to June 10, 1941 he was Deputy General Officer Commanding the 4th Infantry Division, while from July 1 to August 26 he was Military Commander of Iași. Afterwards he took command of the 8th Division, which he led in battle on the Eastern Front. For his actions during the Siege of Odessa, he was awarded the Order of Michael the Brave, 3rd class. Carlaonț was promoted to major general in 1942, and served as Secretary-General in the Ministry of War September–October 1944, after which he went into reserve and then retired in 1945.

He was arrested in February 1945, accused of war crimes while he was military commander of Iași in 1941, right after the Iași pogrom of 28–30 June 1941, but was freed in August 1945. He was arrested again in October 1948 and imprisoned, but acquitted and released in 1950. In 1951, he was condemned to 12 years imprisonment for crimes against humanity. However, he was pardoned and released in 1955. He was again arrested from 1959 to 1960. This time, he was condemned to 7 years imprisonment for anti-social activities but released later that year from Jilava Prison. He died in Bucharest in 1970.
