= Dealu Mare Monastery =

Romanian Orthodox monastery in Romania

Coordinates: 44°43′10″N 23°18′44″E

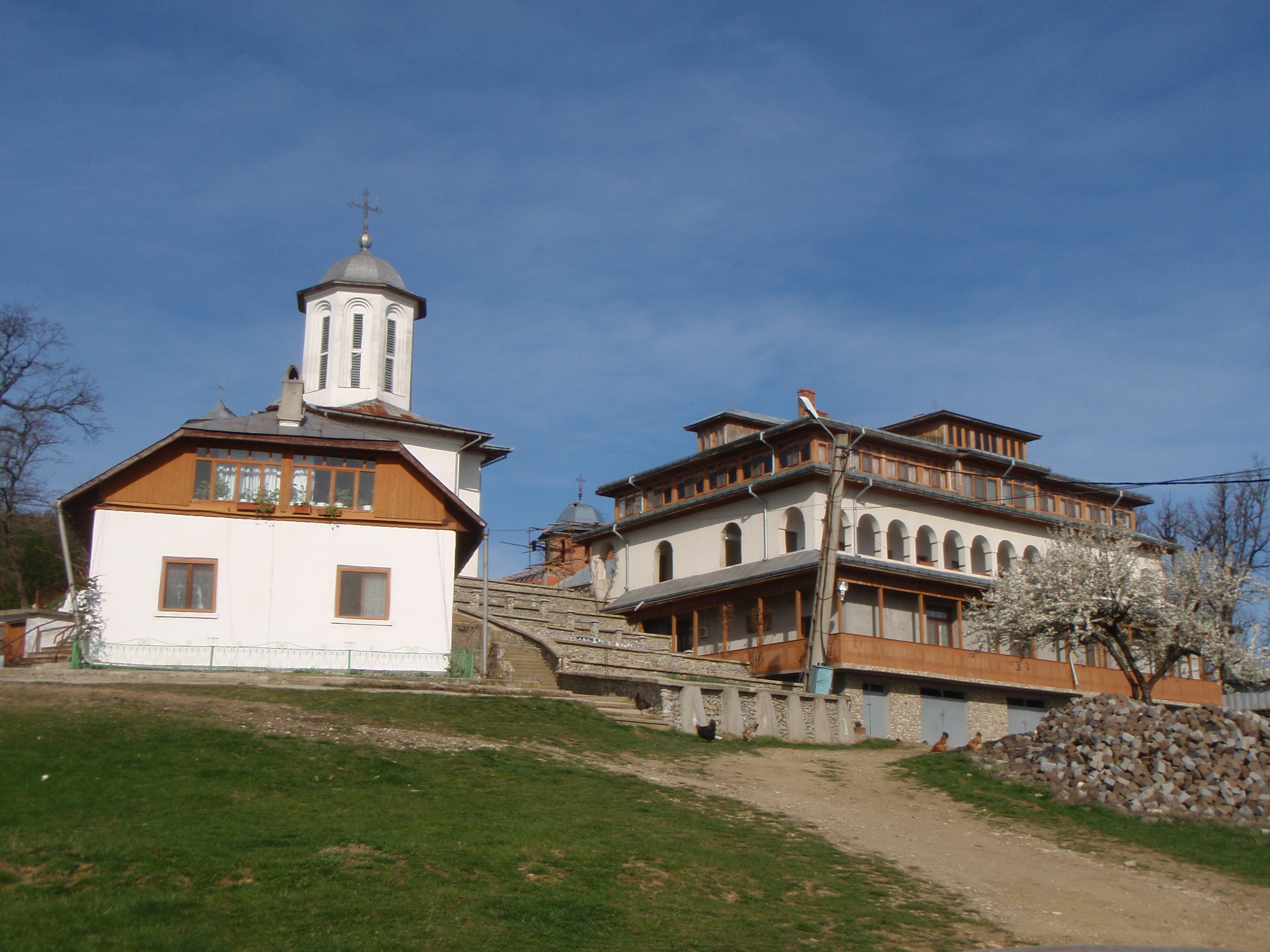

Religion
- Affiliation: Romanian Orthodox Church
- Leadership: Monahia Pahomia Pascu

Location
- Location: Borăscu, Gorj County, Romania
- Interactive map of Dealu Mare Monastery

Architecture
- Groundbreaking: 19th century
- Materials: stone, brick

Dealu Mare Monastery (Romanian: Mănăstirea Dealu Mare) is a Romanian Orthodox monastery in Romania, located in the commune of Borăscu, Gorj County.

== Geography ==
The monastery is located at 9 km from Sfânta Treime Monastery.

== History ==
On the table that describes the history of the Dealu Mare Monastery, one can read:

The Holy Dealu Mare Monastery belongs to Borăscu region and it is located at 65 km from Târgu Jiu, to Filiasi, at the west of Garbov village, Turceni region, on the top of Dealu Mare, colloquially and traditionally named "Cioaca lui Surcel".

It represents the foundation of Constantin Savoiu - member of the ad hoc Divan, who voted for the Union in 1859, and senator of Mehedinți County. In 1878, he died in exile in Vienna, and the lifeless body was brought in country; it is to be found in the scrape from the tomb under the holy place, together with the bones of the other members of the family.

Constantin Savoiu founded seven churches, among which St. Constantin and Elena Church in Târgu Jiu, as well as School No. 8 in the same town. The monastery has two parts:

- the Assumption (15 August) and
- the Holy Emperors Constantin and Elena (21 May)

Because of hard times, the monastery was closed in 1962, and the last living monks were forced to go to other monasteries.

Due to the endeavor of the descendant Constantin Lafcovici "Mosulica", the son of Magdalena Mihail Savoiu, helped by the priest-vicar Marin Mataca from Garbov, at this monastery have been officiated prayers from time to time (starting from 21 May 1977).

For 30 years (1962–1992), the monastery Dealu Mare has reached a deplorable state.

From 1 February 1992, the Holy Metropolitan Church of Oltenia has re-opened this monastic place, with nuns from ‘Sfanta Treime’ Monastery in Stramba – Jiu. At the same time, the works of re-building the ruined houses began, along with those of consolidating the church- which included only the altar and the nave- and of building the pro-nave and the porch, works that ended in 2001.

Initially, the church had a Greek cross with three apses, in the middle one resting the altar, and the nave, between the two, sustains-in the center- the dome, with the frames of the windows in arches.

The architectural genre and the painting belong to the Italian classic style, and the one who made the interior decorations is the Transylvanian painter Nicolae Popescu, from Timișoara, whom Constantin Savoiu had met in Vienna, while the painter was studying at Theresianum.

The painting of the whole church in the Byzantine style as well as the construction of the new body of cells are initiated the following years.

== Gallery ==
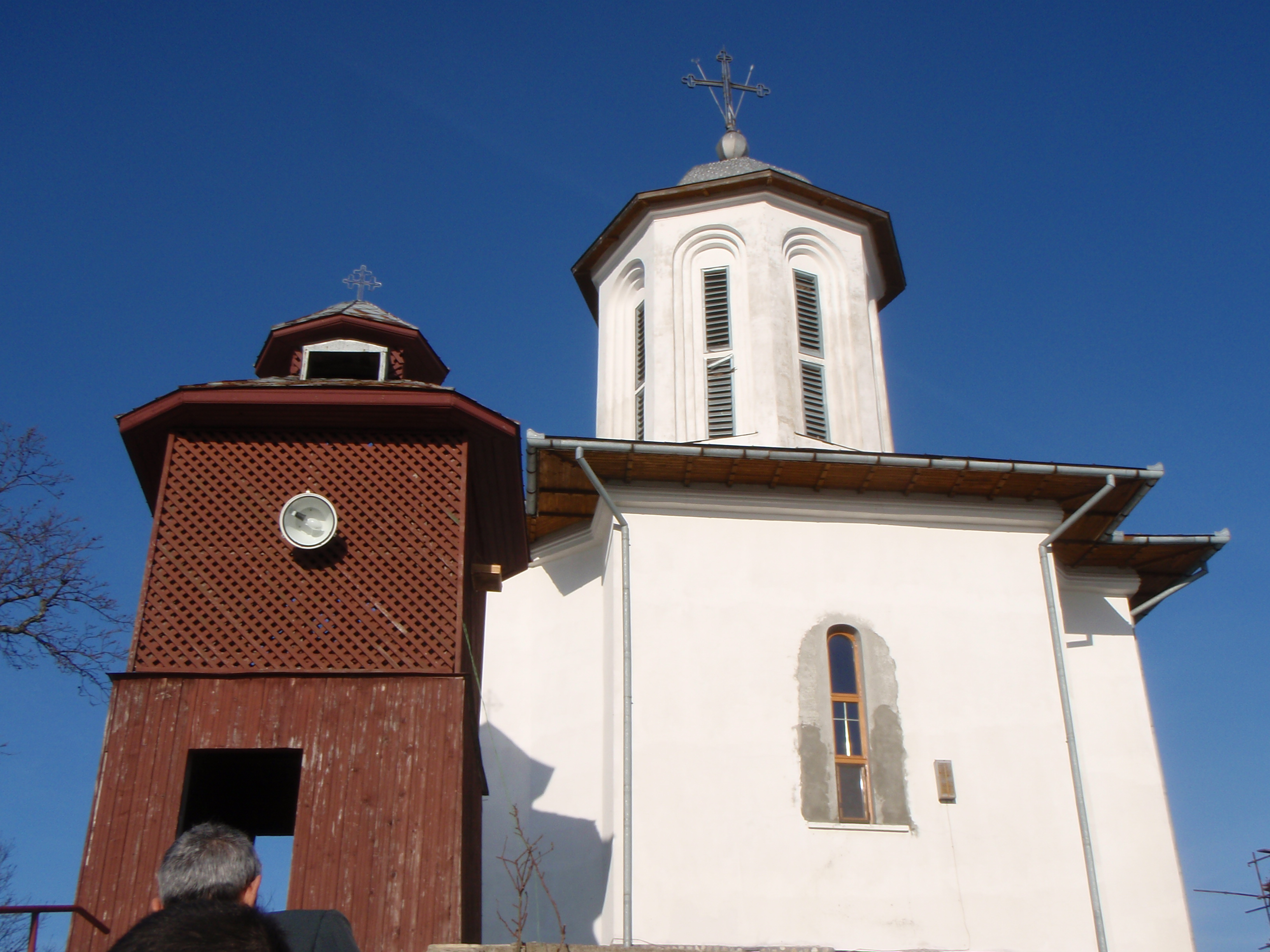
The church and the Bell Tower of the Monastery Dealu Mare

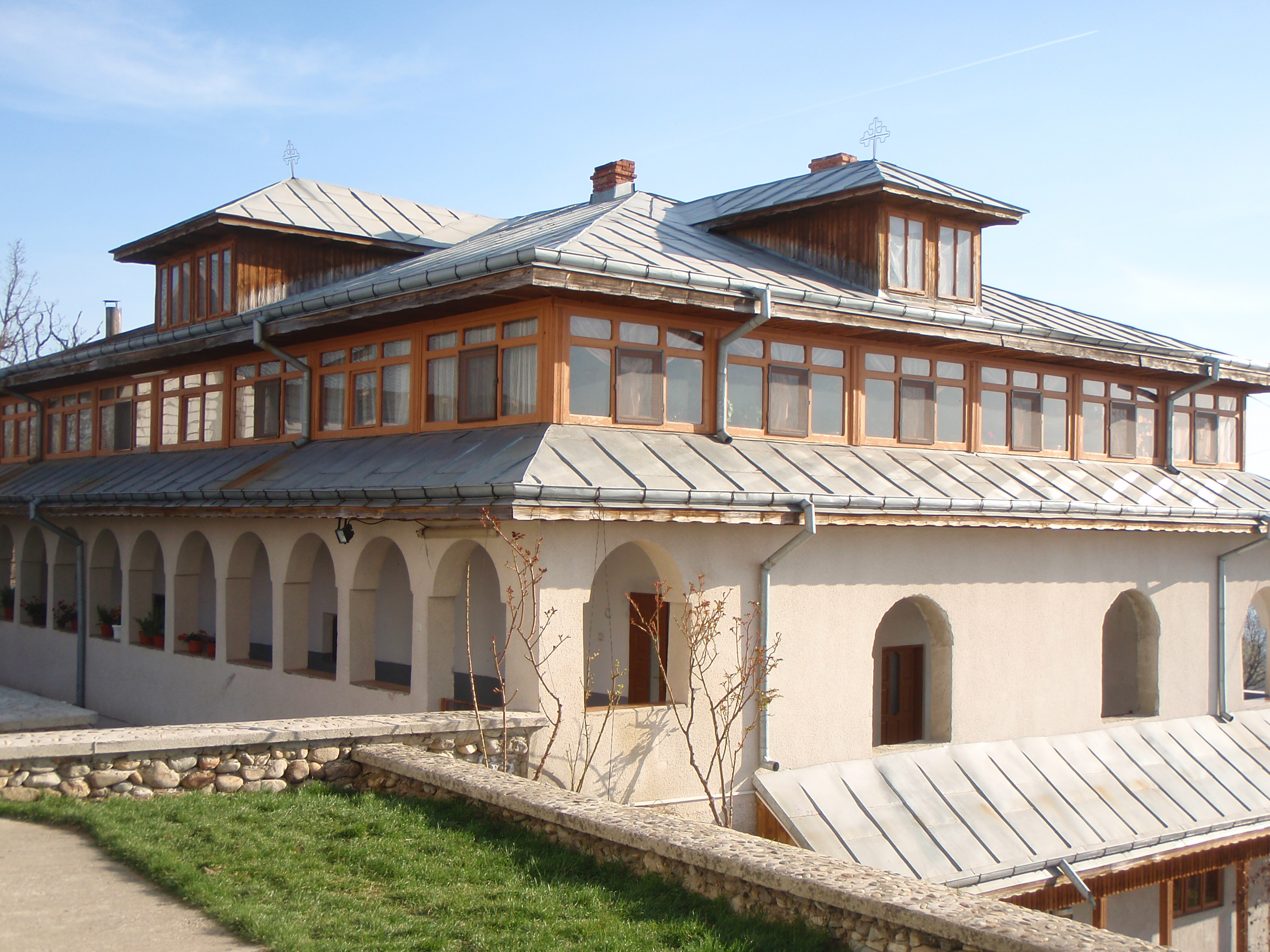
Body of cells

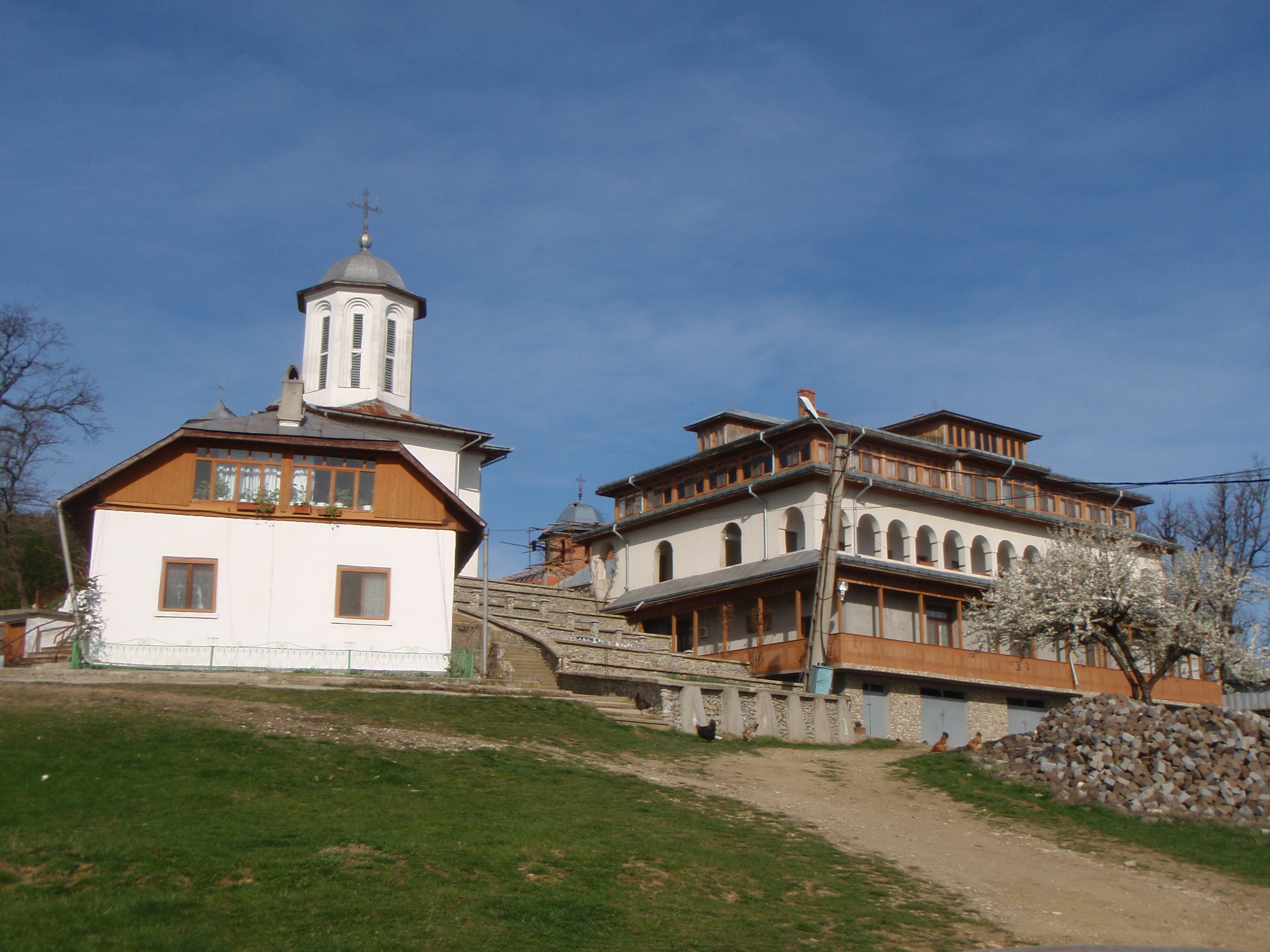
View

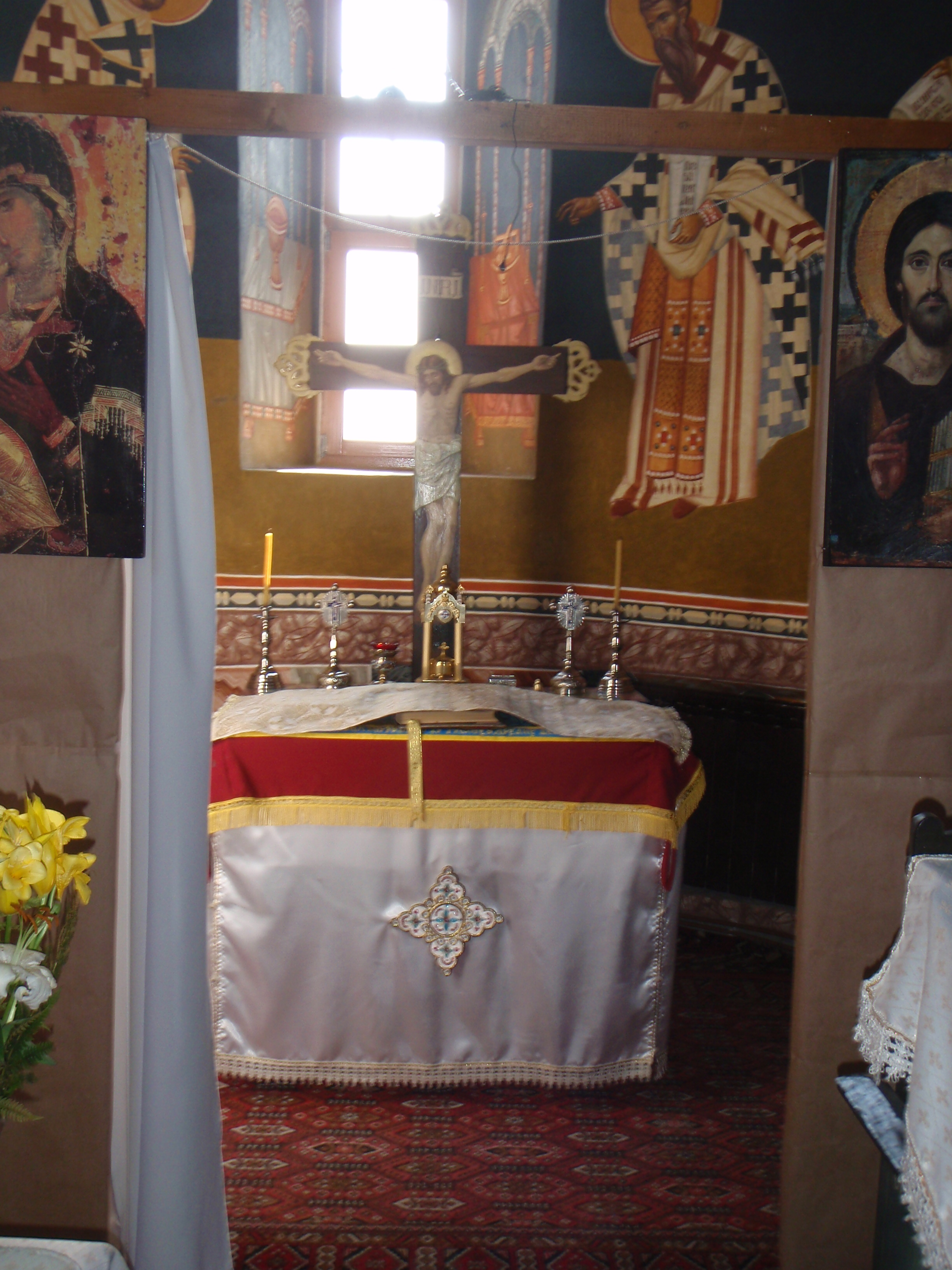
Interior

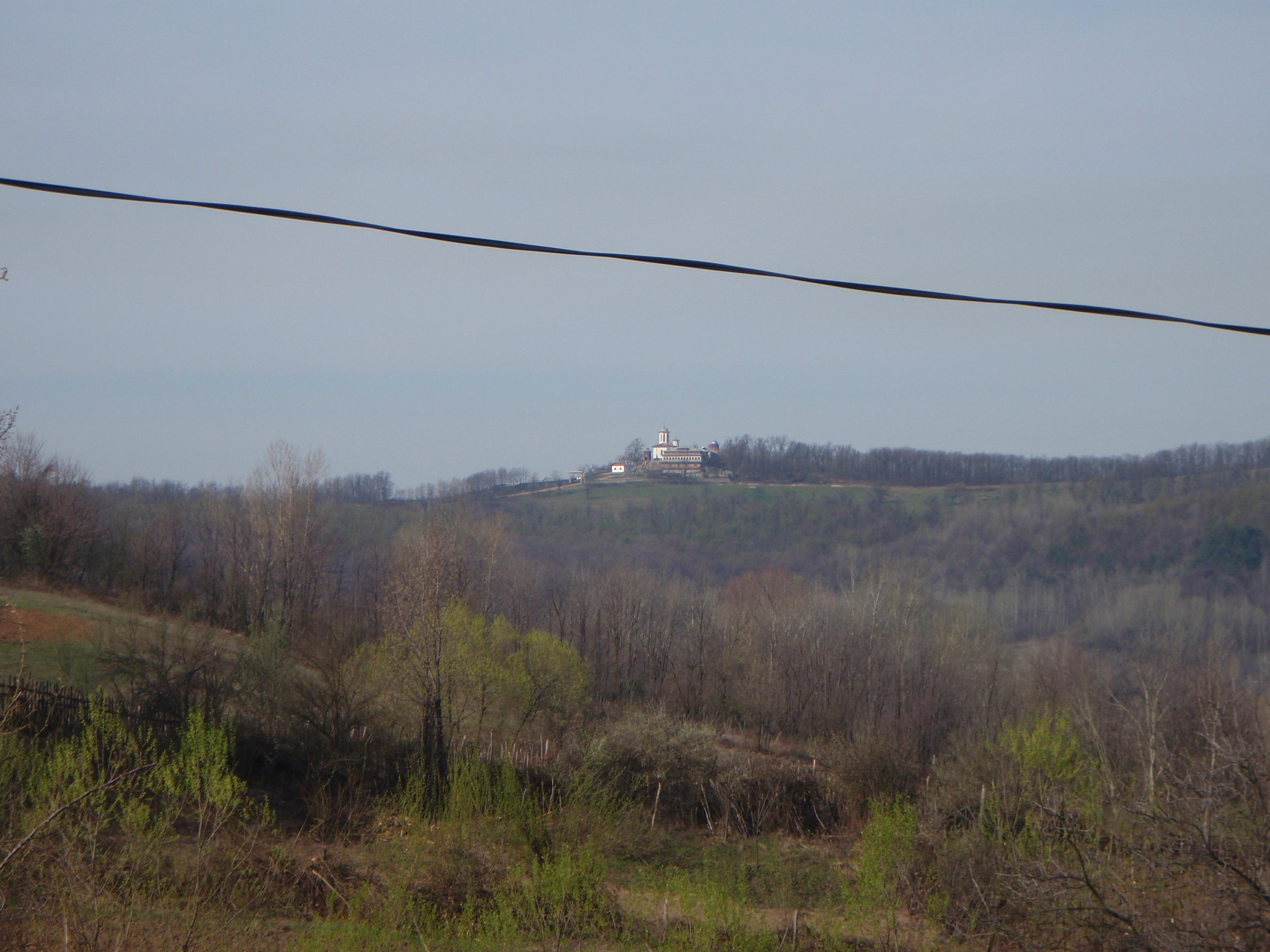
View

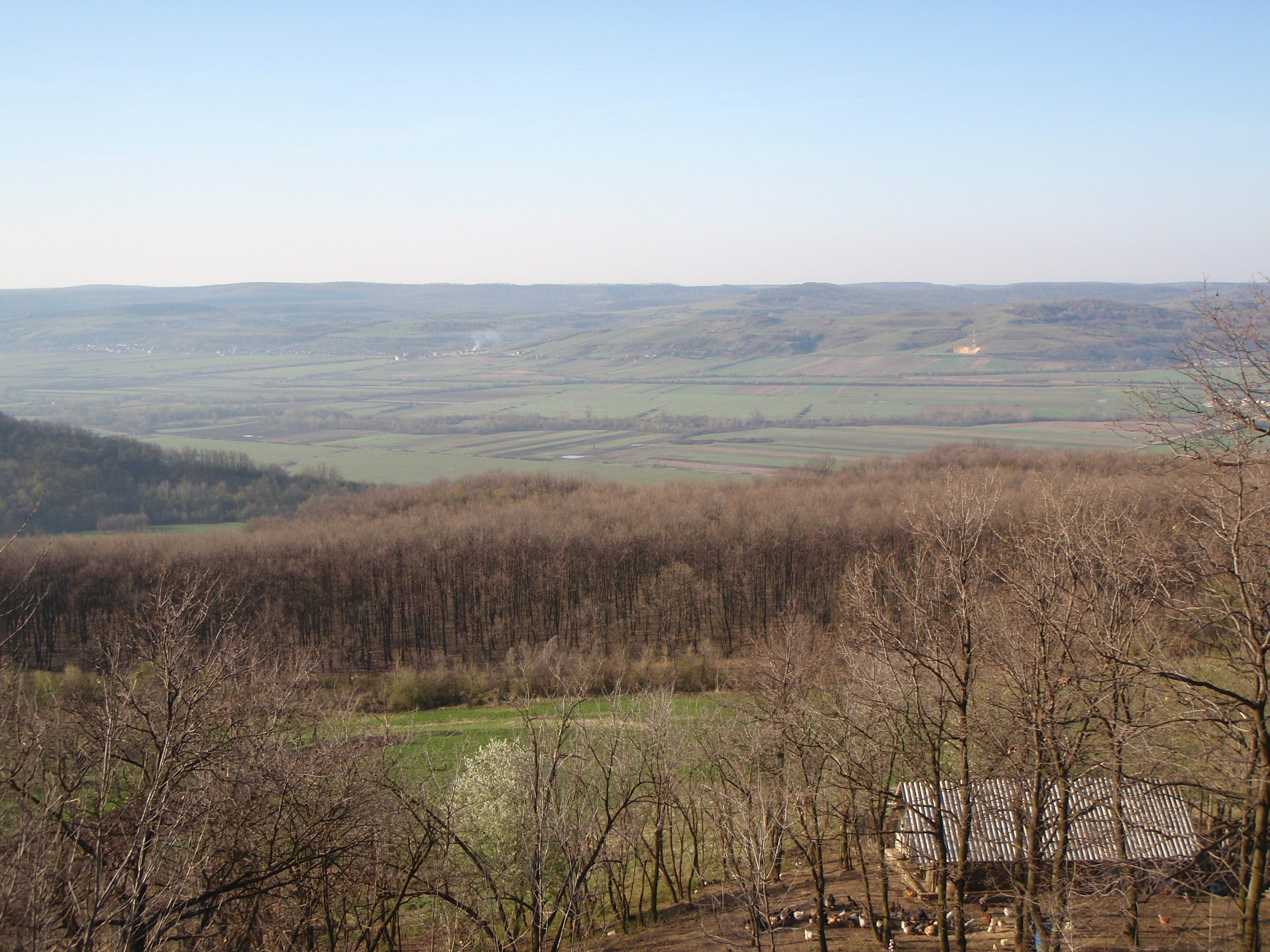
View

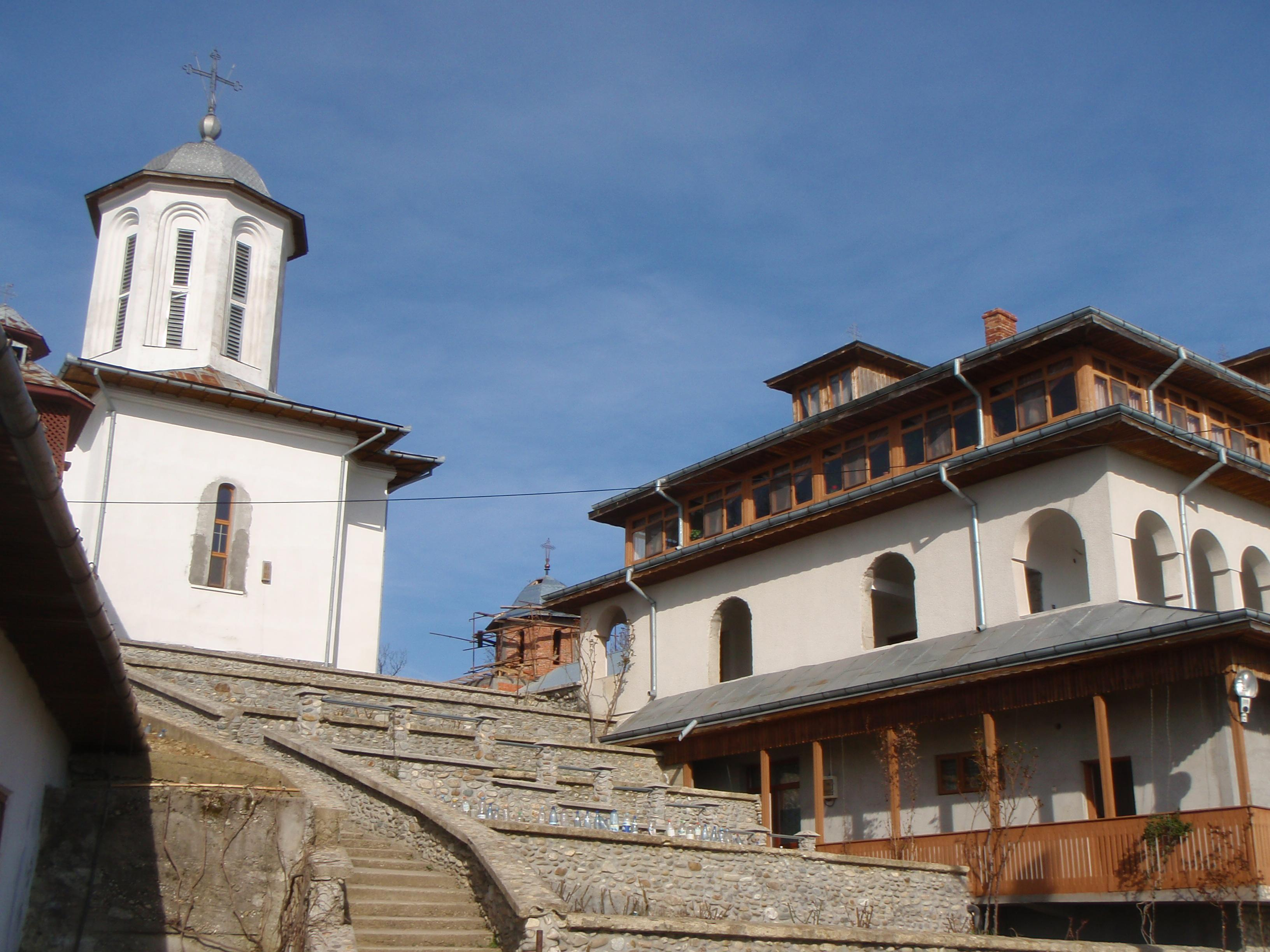
The church

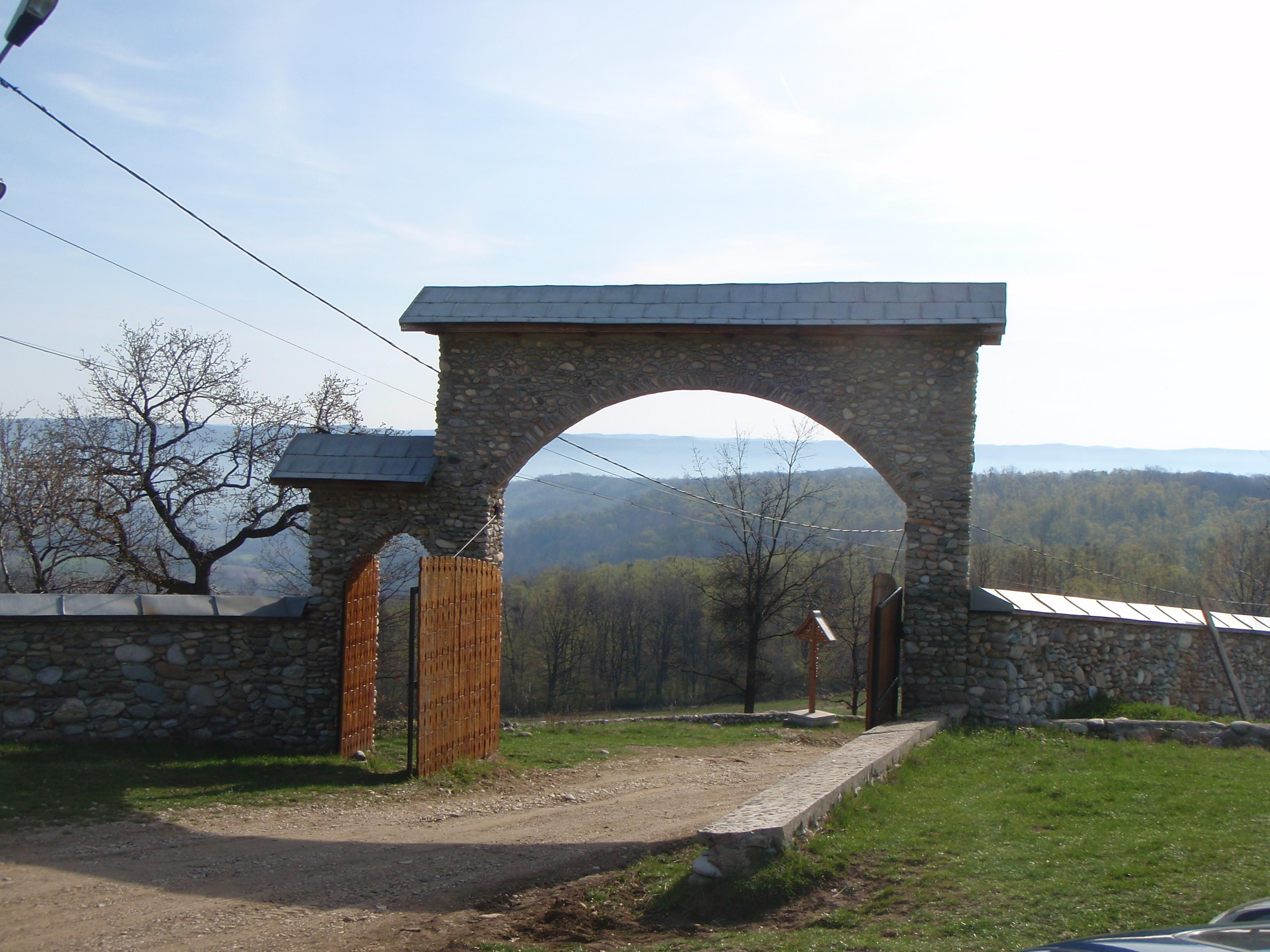
The gate

== Sources ==
- The table that describes the history of the Dealu Mare Monastery
