= Jilțul Mic =

- Location within Romania

Location
- Country: Romania
- Counties: Gorj County
- Villages: Murgilești, Valea

Physical characteristics
- Mouth: Jilț
  - coordinates: 44.7270°N 23.2607°E
- Length: 17 km (11 mi)
- Basin size: 40 km^{2} (15 sq mi)

Basin features
- Progression: Jilț→ Jiu→ Danube→ Black Sea
- River code: VII.1.33.3

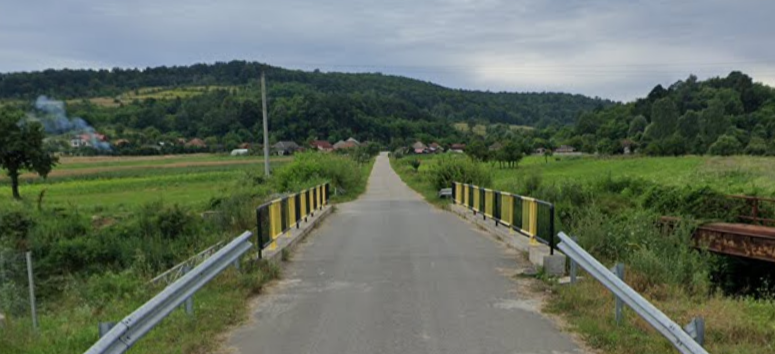

The Jilțul Mic is a right tributary of the river Jilț in Romania. It flows into the Jilț near Ohaba-Jiu. Its length is 17 km (11 mi) and its basin size is 40 km^{2} (15 sq mi).
