= Dobrovăț Monastery =

Monastery in Iași County, Romania

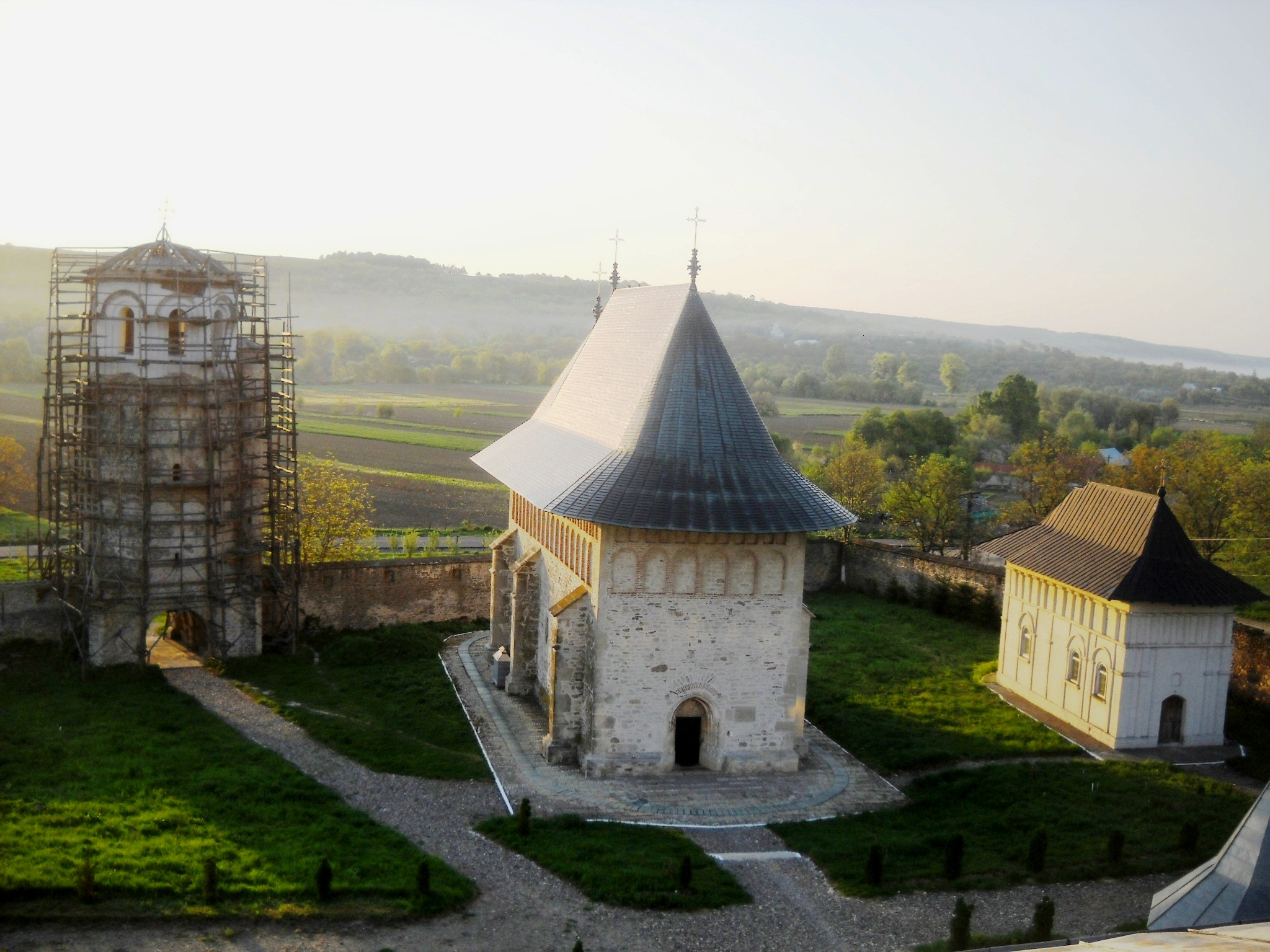

Religion
- Affiliation: Romanian Orthodox Church

Location
- Location: Dobrovăț-Ruși, Iași County, Romania
- Interactive map of Dobrovăț Monastery
- Coordinates: 46.97038°N 27.70514°E

Architecture
- Style: Moldavian
- Groundbreaking: 27 April 1503
- Completed: 1504
- Materials: stone

The Dobrovăț Monastery (Romanian: Mănăstirea Dobrovăț) is a Romanian Orthodox monastery located in Dobrovăț-Ruși, Iași County, Romania. The monastery is listed in the National Register of Historic Monuments.

== History ==
Located 25 km (16 mi) southeast of the city of Iași, the monastery, dedicated to the Holy Spirit, is the last holy founding that Stephen the Great, the Voivode of Moldavia, erected during his reign. It was completed in 1504 by Bogdan III, son of Stephen. The paintings inside the church of the monastic complex were executed during the reign of Petru Rareș Voivode, another son of Stephen the Great, between 1527 and 1530.

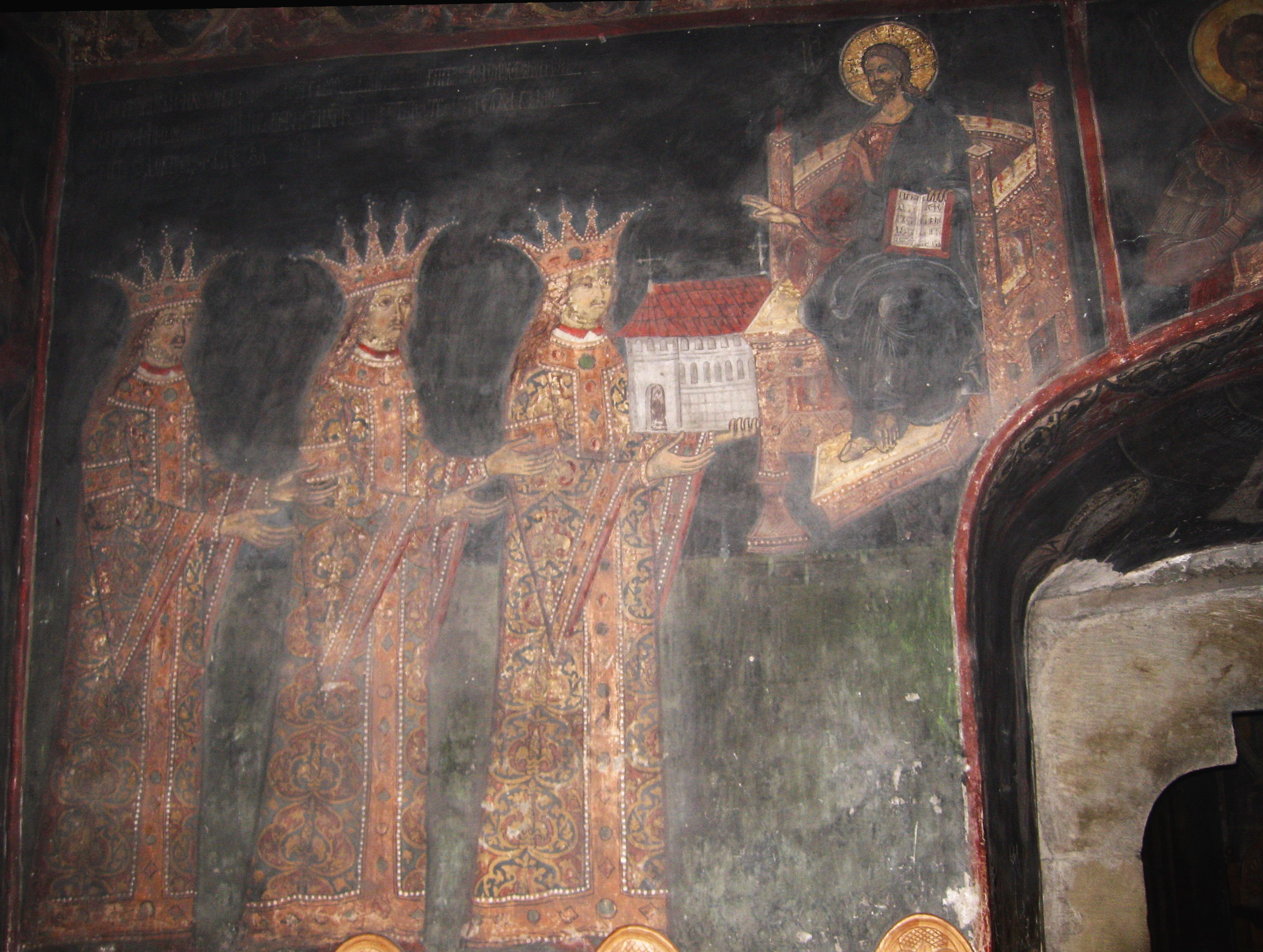
The picture inside the church

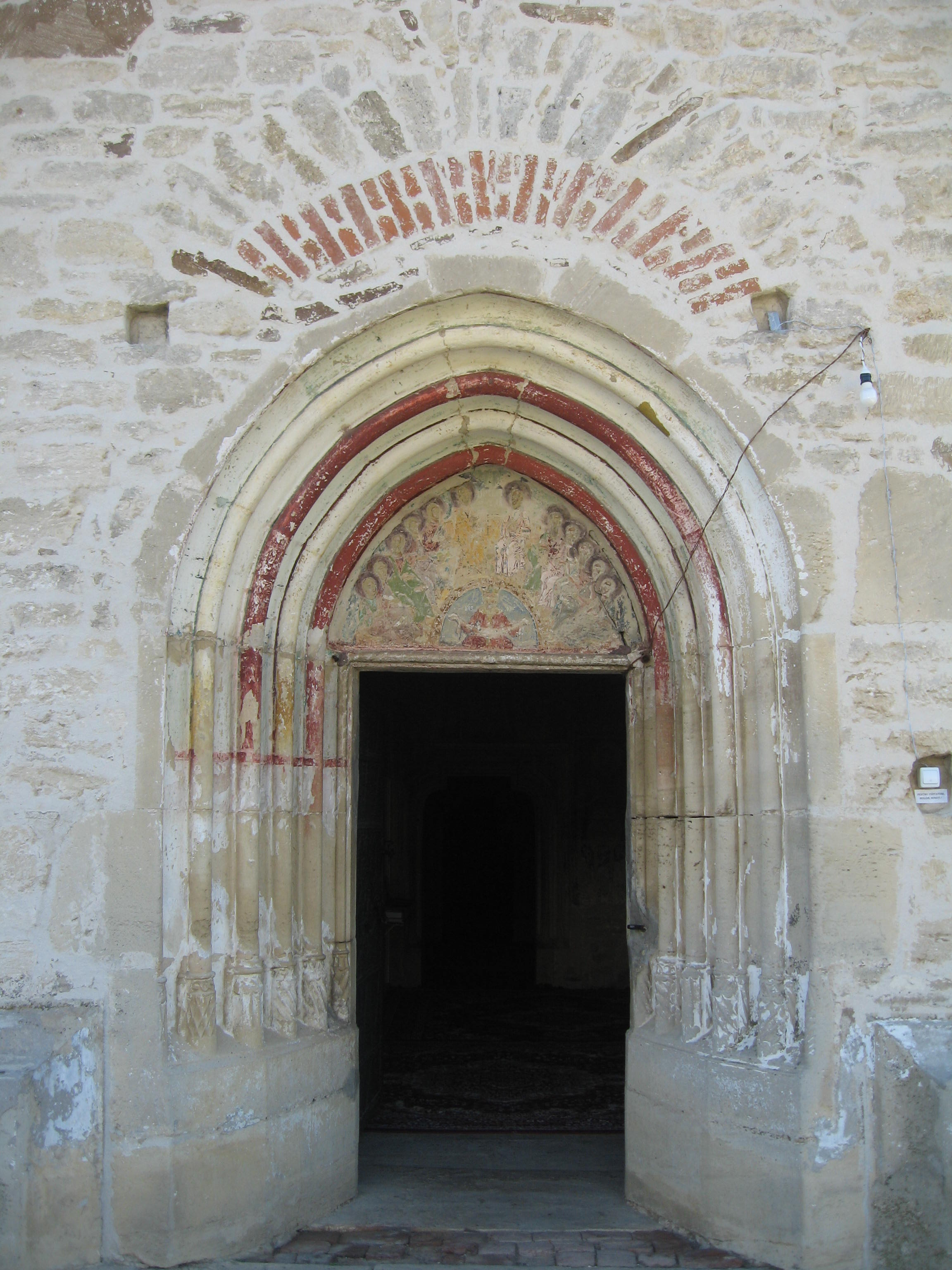
Church entry door
