= Borăscu (Jilț) =

- Location within Romania

Location
- Country: Romania
- Counties: Gorj County
- Villages: Miluta, Gura-Menți, Borăscu

Physical characteristics
- Mouth: Jilț
  - coordinates: 44.6991°N 23.3183°E
- Length: 19 km (12 mi)
- Basin size: 46 km^{2} (18 sq mi)

Basin features
- Progression: Jilț→ Jiu→ Danube→ Black Sea
- River code: VII.1.33.5

The Borăscu is a right tributary of the river Jilț in Romania. It flows into the Jilț near the village Borăscu. Its length is 19 km (12 mi) and its basin size is 46 km^{2} (18 sq mi).
