= Trivale Monastery =

Monastery in Pitești, Romania

- Mănăstirea Trivale
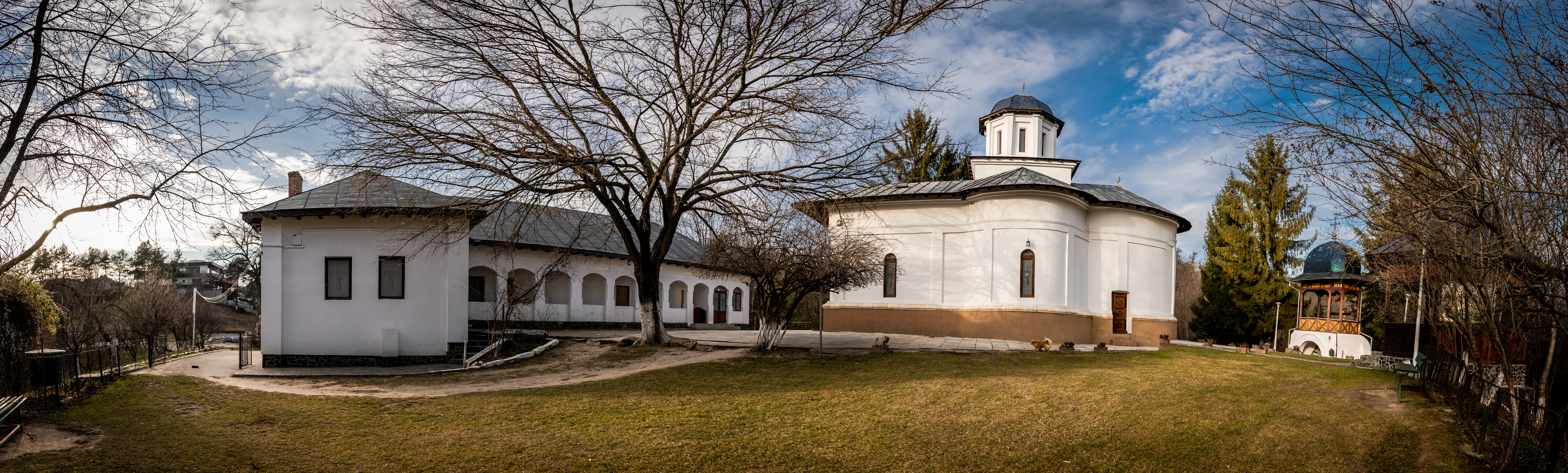
- Trivale Monastery in 2020

Religion
- Affiliation: Eastern Orthodox
- Patron: Holy Trinity
- Status: Active

Location
- Location: Pitești, Argeș County, Romania
- Interactive map of Trivale Monastery
- Coordinates: 44.8530°N 24.8485°E

Architecture
- Groundbreaking: XVII-XIX centuries
- Materials: Albești stone, brick

The Trivale Monastery (Romanian: Mănăstirea Trivale) is a monastery located in Trivale Park, Pitești, Romania.

The monastery is thought to have been established in the 16th century, although the exact date remains uncertain. There is a legend that the monastery temporarily housed the head of Michael the Brave (1593–1601) before it was transferred to Dealu Monastery. It is known that Doamna Stanca owned numerous properties around Pitești, so the hypothesis of her presence here is plausible. The enlightened monk Ioan Cantacuzino, who transcribed "The Life and Habits of Our Holy Father Nifon, Patriarch of Constantinople," written by Gavril Protul in 1682, also lived here. This document is important for the history of the Religion of Wallachia.

Originally, the monastery was a wooden church, later rebuilt in stone during the reign of Matei Basarab. However, between 1670 and 1673, the church fell into ruins and was reconstructed once again in stone and brick by Varlaam II, Metropolitan of Wallachia. This is evidenced by an inscription found in 1895 during the construction of a road. During the same period, the abbot's houses, cells, enclosing walls, and bell tower were also built. The entire complex was constructed between 1672 and 1688.

Ascending the steps carved in stone from Albești and passing beneath the bell tower, one arrives at the monastery's church. The church preserves interior frescoes which were painted by Ioasaf Grecu in 1731.

Devastated by the earthquake of 1827, the monastery was rebuilt between 1854 and 1856 by Archimandrite Terotei. What can be seen today is the result of the restoration work carried out from 1854 to 1856. Only the foundations and walls from Varlaam's foundation remained until the raising of the belt. Trivale Monastery was rebuilt after the earthquake of 1940, with the works between 1942 and 1944 being coordinated by the Argeș Bishopric.

During the communist period of Romania, and the surrounding countries Trivale Monastery did not function and remained closed. It was reopened in 1991. It currently serves as a monastery, dedicated to the Holy Trinity.

== Documentary Evidence ==
One of the significant sources of evidence is the recording of Pitești under the name "Pitesi coenobium" in the first cartographic depiction of Transylvania—the map "Transilvania" created by J. Sambucus in 1566, in Vienna.

Frequently mentioned in the accounts of foreign travelers, Trivale Monastery is attested in the report of Bulgarian missionary Petru Bogdan Bacsic from the year 1640: "The city has beautiful churches, a monastery of monks, and 200 Romanian houses, which means about a thousand souls." Italian archaeologist and numismatist Domenico Sestini, during his visit in May 1780, noted the existence of approximately 250 houses, including many boyar houses, 17 churches, and a monastery in Pitești. The following year, Franz Joseph Sulzer, the secretary of Prince Alexandru Ipsilanti, recorded the presence of eight churches, a monastery, and several boyar houses in the town of Pitești.
