= Fărcășești =

- Commune
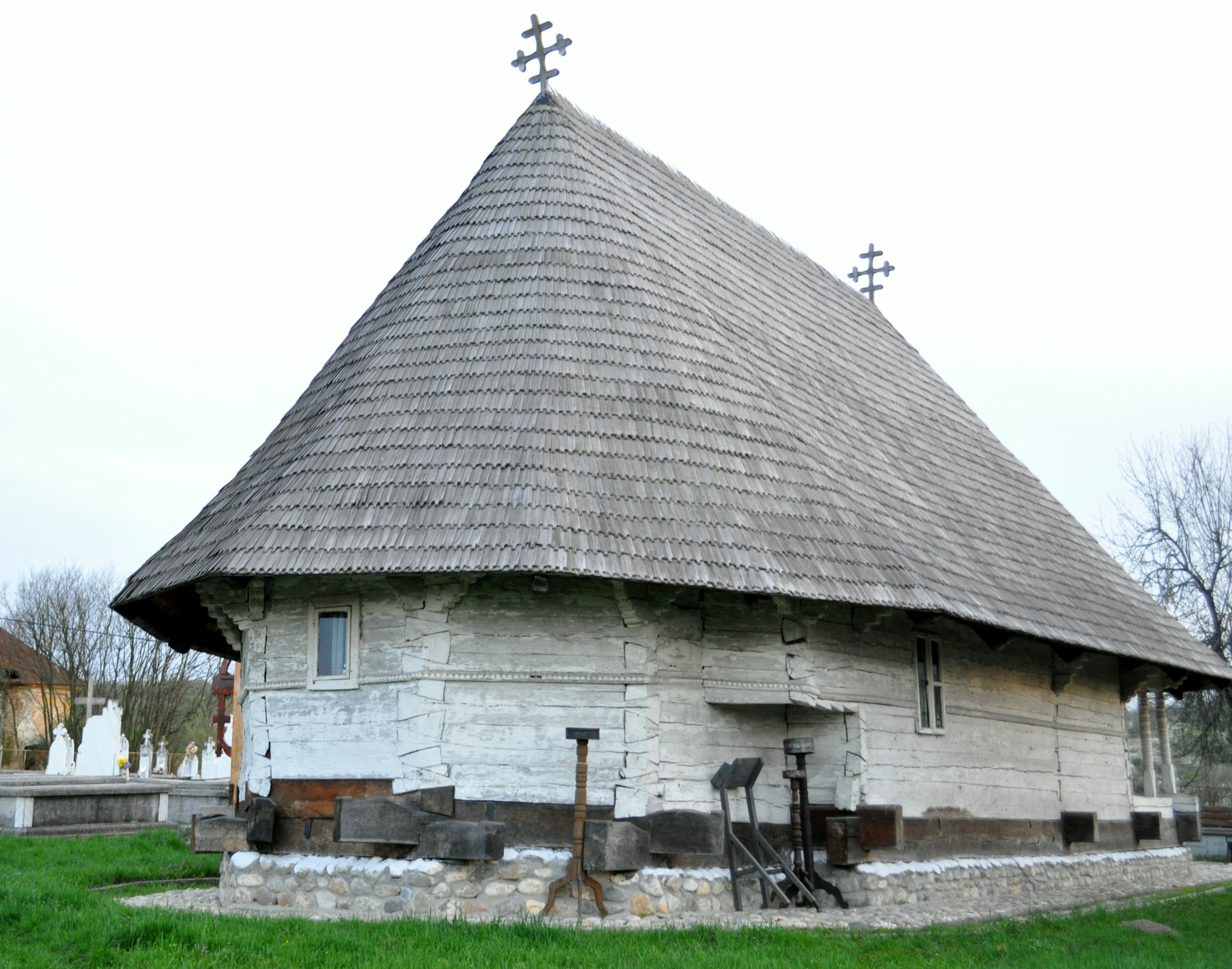
- Wooden church in Fărcășești-Broștenița

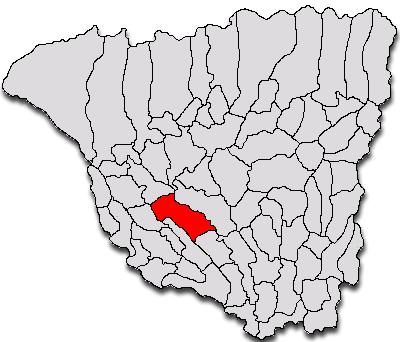
- Location in Gorj County

- Location in Romania
- Coordinates: 44°52′N 23°12′E
- Country: Romania
- County: Gorj
- Subdivisions: Fărcășești, Fărcășești-Moșneni, Peșteana de Jos, Rogojel, Roșia-Jiu, Timișeni, Valea cu Apă

Government
  - Mayor (2020–2024): Constantin Drăgoescu (PNL)
- Area: 84.06 km^{2} (32.46 sq mi)
- Elevation: 157 m (515 ft)
- Population (2021-12-01): 3,253
  - Density: 38.70/km^{2} (100.2/sq mi)
- Time zone: UTC+02:00 (EET)
  - Summer (DST): UTC+03:00 (EEST)
- Postal code: 217235
- Area code: +(40) x53
- Vehicle reg.: GJ
- Website: primariafarcasesti-gj.ro

Fărcășești is a commune in Gorj County, Oltenia, Romania. It is composed of seven villages: Fărcășești, Fărcășești-Moșneni, Peșteana de Jos, Rogojel, Roșia-Jiu, Timișeni, and Valea cu Apă.

== Natives ==
- Victor Popescu (1886 – 1970), officer in the Romanian Army and a guerrilla warrior in World War I
