= Dobrovăț =

- Commune
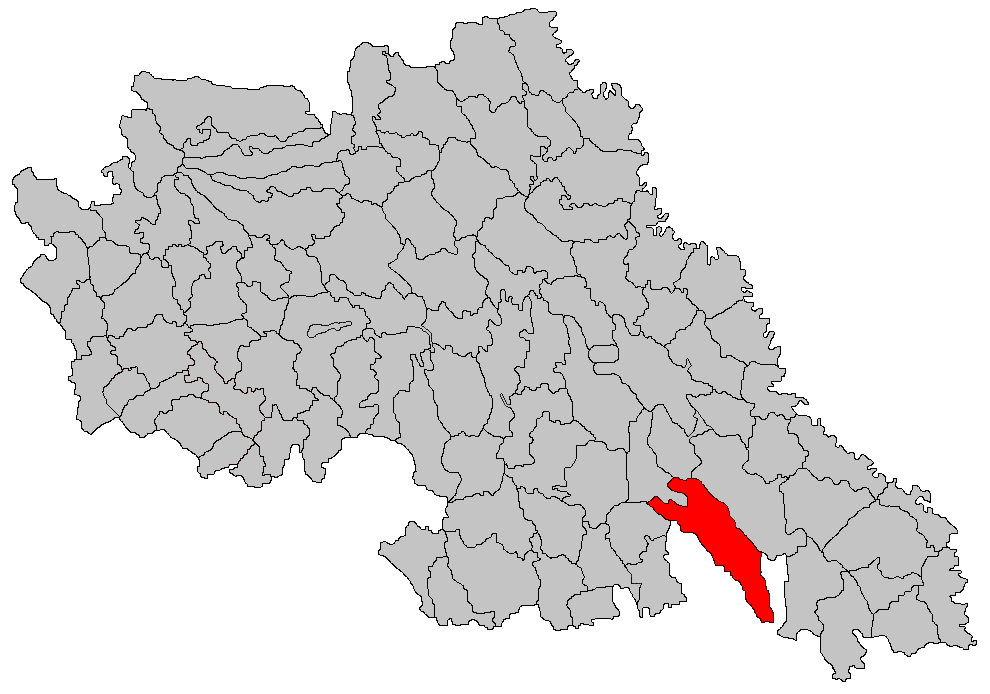
- Location in Iași County

- Location in Romania
- Coordinates: 46°57′N 27°42′E
- Country: Romania
- County: Iași

Government
  - Mayor (2024–2028): Cătălin-Iulian Martinuș (PSD)
- Elevation: 185 m (607 ft)
- Population (2021-12-01): 2,128
- Time zone: EET/EEST (UTC+2/+3)
- Postal code: 707175
- Area code: +40 x32
- Vehicle reg.: IS
- Website: www.comunadobrovat.ro

Dobrovăț is a commune in Iași County, Western Moldavia, Romania. It is composed of a single village, Dobrovăț.
