= Plăviceni Monastery =

Monastery in Teleorman County, Romania

Plăviceni Monastery, also called Aluniş Monastery, is located in the south of Romania, in the village of Plopii-Slăvitești in Teleorman County, 33 km northwest of Turnu Măgurele and 30 km south of Drăgăneşti-Olt. The monastery is located in the woods found along the Olt River meadow.

== History ==
Plăviceni Monastery was founded by Dragomir, governor of Plăviceni, during the reign of Matei Basarab, between 1646 and 1649. The church was painted in 1815, but today it is in an advanced state of ruin. Because of its isolation after 1950, the monastery entered a slow process of degradation; lack of interest from local people also contributed to this. The whole assembly that consisted of the church, the imposing belfry house, two rows of cells and walls of defense are now once again reconstructed.
