= Bujoreni Monastery =

Orthodox monetary in Romania

Bujoreni Monastery (Mănăstirea Magarului) is an Orthodox monastery in Bujoreni forest, Zorleni Commune, Vaslui County, Romania.

The monastic settlement was set up in the 16th–17th centuries (a. 1602), as a convent of the Bujoreanu family, on their property bearing the same name, in a secluded place in the forest.

The legend says that the church was built by the monetary contribution of some shepherds who arrived from the mountains to spend the winter, on the place of an old oak, where a donkey knelt various times, and into the hollow of which was found an icon representing the Virgin Mary and Child. It is said that this icon, capable of performing miracles, was hidden by the monks from the nearby Recea Monastery, which was destroyed during the Tartar incursions around 1440.

The convent’s church, patronized by the Dormition of the Virgin Mary, was reconstructed using wood at the end of the 18th century by the chancellor Gavril Conachi, owner of the property, and was rebuilt from the wall by his son, the monk Ioanichie Conachi around 1840. After the death of its founder, the convent was maintained by his niece, Ruxanda Rosnovanu, who inherited the Zorleni and Bujorenii estates. In 1911, the convent was maintained by the Royal House, by the Administration of the Zorleni estate, becoming royal property from 1883. Damaged by the earthquake in 1940, the church was restored, and was in use until 1958, when the convent was deconsecrated. In 1993, monastery status was reinstated. Between 1994–2002, the assembly was completed by new cells and other household dependencies, the precinct being surrounded by a stone fence. Placed in a natural picturesque background and well organized as a household, the monastery may provide services of ecumenical tourism.

The church was renovated in 2001–2002. It keeps the three-apse plan, with a semicircular altar apse and a belfry tower to the west. It shelters the tomb of its founder in a niche in the wall between the nave and narthex.

In 2023, eight new monks joined the monastery.
