= Mătăsari =

- Commune
- Location in Romania
- Coordinates: 44°51′N 23°05′E
- Country: Romania
- County: Gorj
- Subdivisions: Brădet, Brădețel, Croici, Mătăsari, Runcurel
- Area: 46.44 km^{2} (17.93 sq mi)
- Population (2021-12-01): 4,694
  - Density: 101.1/km^{2} (261.8/sq mi)
- Time zone: UTC+02:00 (EET)
  - Summer (DST): UTC+03:00 (EEST)
- Vehicle reg.: GJ

Mătăsari is a commune in Gorj County, Oltenia, Romania. It is composed of five villages: Brădet, Brădețel, Croici, Mătăsari and Runcurel.
