= Slivilești =

- Commune
- Location in Romania
- Coordinates: 44°47′N 23°08′E
- Country: Romania
- County: Gorj
- Subdivisions: Cojmănești, Miculești, Slivilești, Strâmtu, Sura, Șiacu, Știucani, Tehomir
- Area: 61.49 km^{2} (23.74 sq mi)
- Population (2021-12-01): 2,780
  - Density: 45.2/km^{2} (117/sq mi)
- Time zone: UTC+02:00 (EET)
  - Summer (DST): UTC+03:00 (EEST)
- Vehicle reg.: GJ

Slivilești is a commune in Gorj County, Oltenia, Romania. It is composed of eight villages: Cojmănești, Miculești, Slivilești, Strâmtu, Sura, Șiacu, Știucani and Tehomir.

== Natives ==
- Dumitru Carlaonț
- Ioan Carlaonț
