= Drăgotești, Gorj =

Drăgotești
- Commune
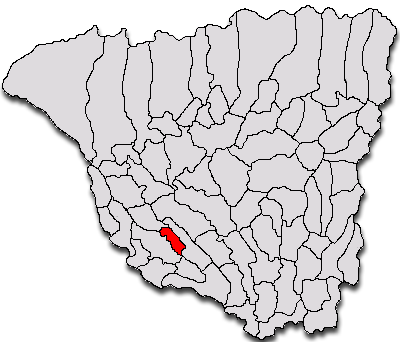
- Location in Gorj County

- Location in Romania
- Coordinates: 44°48′N 23°10′E
- Country: Romania
- County: Gorj
- Subdivisions: Corobăi, Drăgotești, Trestioara
- Area: 27.84 km^{2} (10.75 sq mi)
- Population (2021-12-01): 2,161
  - Density: 77.62/km^{2} (201.0/sq mi)
- Time zone: UTC+02:00 (EET)
  - Summer (DST): UTC+03:00 (EEST)
- Vehicle reg.: GJ

Drăgotești is a commune in Gorj County, Oltenia, Romania. It is composed of three villages: Corobăi, Drăgotești and Trestioara.
