= Bolboși =

- Commune
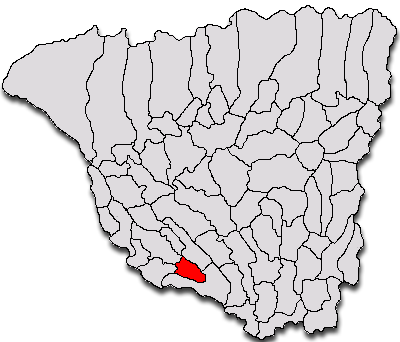
- Location in Gorj County

- Location in Romania
- Coordinates: 44°45′N 23°13′E
- Country: Romania
- County: Gorj
- Subdivisions: Bălăcești, Bolboasa, Bolboși, Igirosu, Miclosu, Ohaba-Jiu, Valea
- Area: 42.06 km^{2} (16.24 sq mi)
- Population (2021-12-01): 3,140
  - Density: 74.7/km^{2} (193/sq mi)
- Time zone: UTC+02:00 (EET)
  - Summer (DST): UTC+03:00 (EEST)
- Vehicle reg.: GJ

Bolboși is a commune in Gorj County, Oltenia, Romania. It is composed of seven villages: Bălăcești, Bolboasa, Bolboși, Igirosu, Miclosu, Ohaba-Jiu and Valea.
