= Turceni =

- Town
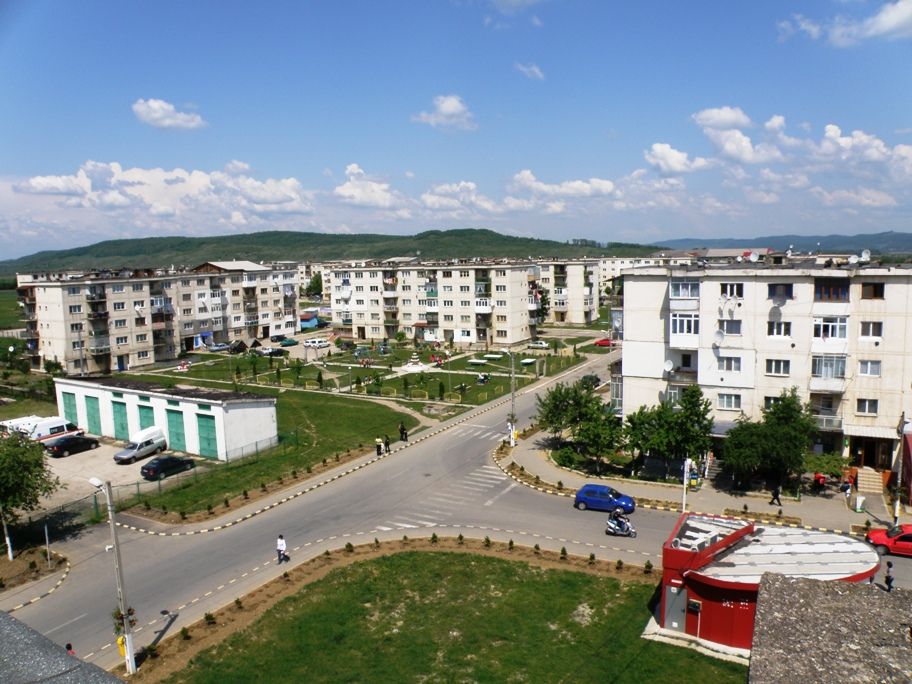

- Coat of arms

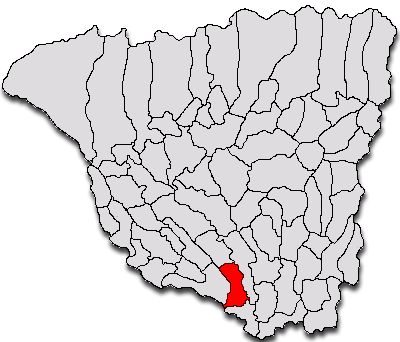
- Location in Gorj County

- Location in Romania
- Coordinates: 44°40′N 23°23′E
- Country: Romania
- County: Gorj
- Subdivisions: Gârbovu, Jilțu, Murgești, Strâmba-Jiu, Valea Viei

Government
  - Mayor (2024–2028): Constantin Popescu (PNL)
- Area: 78.93 km^{2} (30.48 sq mi)
- Elevation: 130 m (430 ft)
- Population (2021-12-01): 6,891
  - Density: 87.31/km^{2} (226.1/sq mi)
- Time zone: UTC+02:00 (EET)
  - Summer (DST): UTC+03:00 (EEST)
- Postal code: 217520
- Area code: (+40) 02 53
- Vehicle reg.: GJ
- Website: www.turceni.ro

Turceni is a town in Gorj County, Oltenia, Romania. It administers five villages: Gârbovu, Jilțu, Murgești, Strâmba-Jiu, and Valea Viei.

Historical population
Year	Pop.	±%
2002	8,559	—
2011	7,269	−15.1%
2021	6,891	−5.2%
Source: Census data

== Natives ==
- Al. C. Calotescu-Neicu (1888–1952), columnist and epigrammatist
- Ionuț Tătaru (born 1989), footballer
