= Borăscu =

- Commune
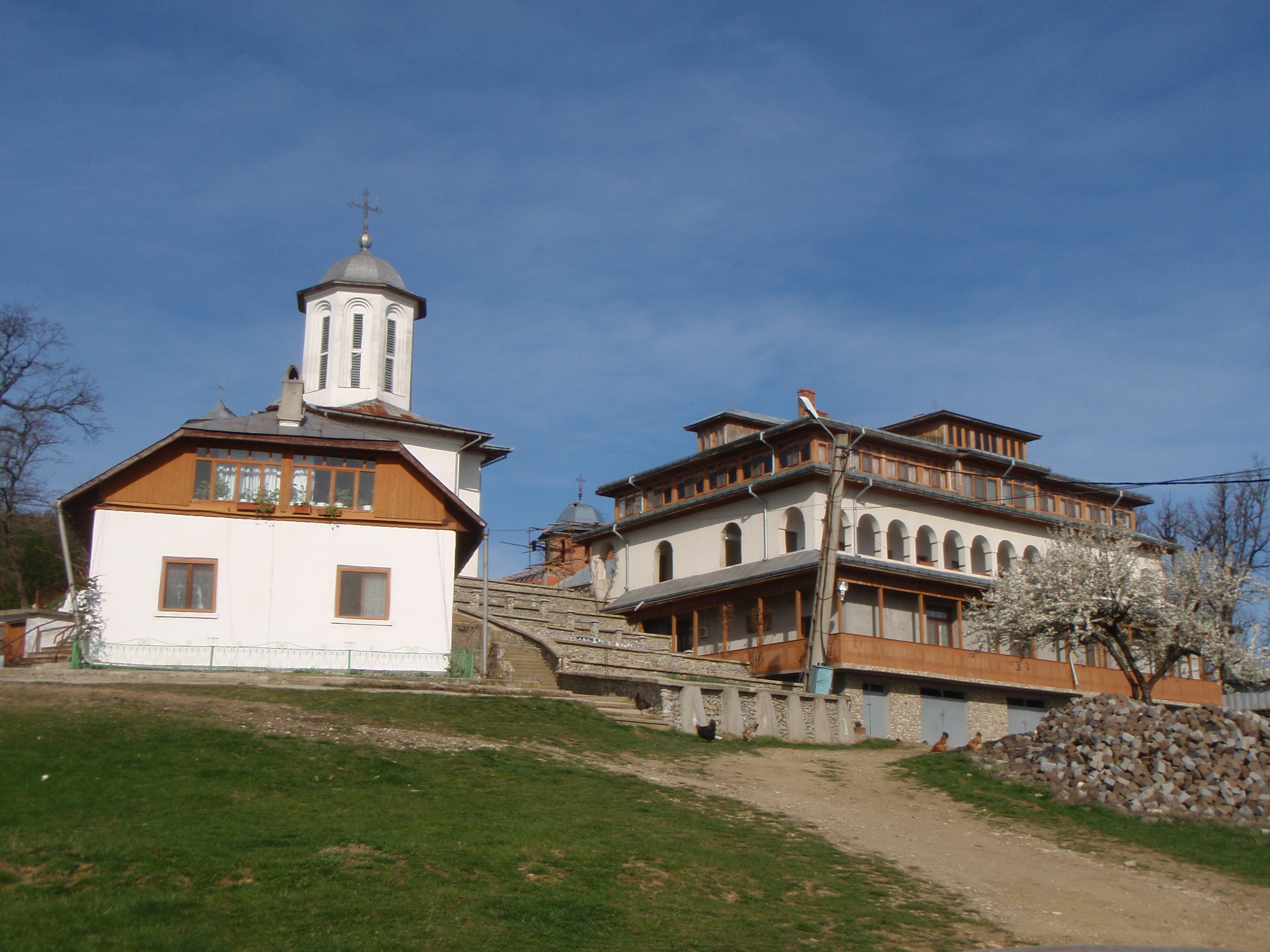
- Dealu Mare Monastery in Borăscu

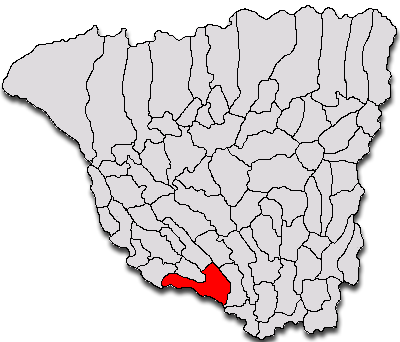
- Location in Gorj County

- Location in Romania
- Coordinates: 44°42′N 23°17′E
- Country: Romania
- County: Gorj
- Subdivisions: Baniu, Borăscu, Calapăru, Gura-Menți, Menții din Dos, Miluta, Scorușu

Government
  - Mayor (2020–2024): Constantin Țucu (PSD)
- Area: 72.07 km^{2} (27.83 sq mi)
- Elevation: 157 m (515 ft)
- Population (2021-12-01): 2,750
  - Density: 38.2/km^{2} (98.8/sq mi)
- Time zone: UTC+02:00 (EET)
  - Summer (DST): UTC+03:00 (EEST)
- Postal code: 217090
- Area code: +40 x53
- Vehicle reg.: GJ
- Website: www.primariaborascu.ro

Borăscu is a commune in Gorj County, Oltenia, Romania. It is composed of seven villages: Baniu, Borăscu, Calapăru, Gura-Menți, Menții din Dos, Miluta, and Scorușu.

== See also ==
- Dealu Mare Monastery
