= Păpușa Peak (Parâng Mountains) =

Mountain in Romania

Coordinates: 45°20′24″N 23°32′23″E

Vârful Păpuşa (Păpuşa peak) is a 2,135-metre (7,005 ft) mountain in the Parâng Mountains of Romania, part of the Parâng Mountains group.

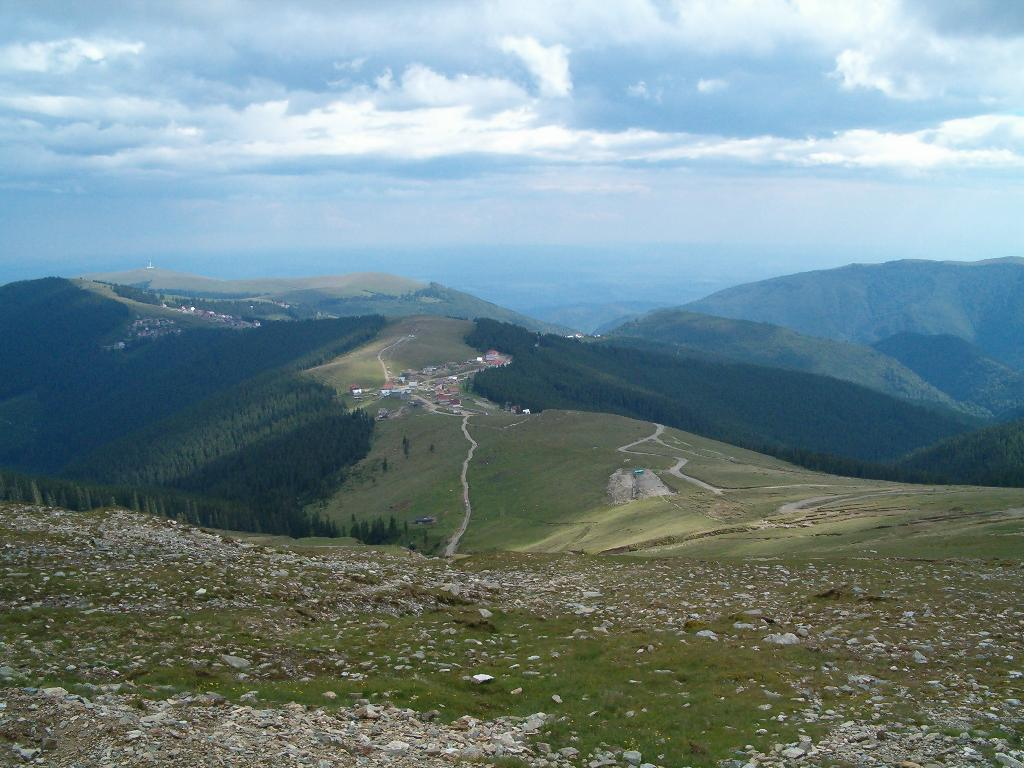
The Transalpina road and Rânca viewed from Păpuşa peak

== Mountains ==
- Parâng Mountains (Munţii Parâng)
- Şureanu Mountains (Munţii Şureanu/M. Sebeşului)
- Cindrel Mountains (Munţii Cindrel/M. Cibinului)
- Lotru Mountains (Munţii Lotrului; literally: Mountains of the Thief)
- Căpăţâna Mountains (Munţii Căpăţânii; literally: Mountains of the Head or Mountains of the Skull)

== See also ==
- Carpathian Mountains
- Retezat-Godeanu Mountains group
- Făgăraş Mountains group
- Transalpina Road
- Rânca
