= Parângu Mare =

Mountain peak

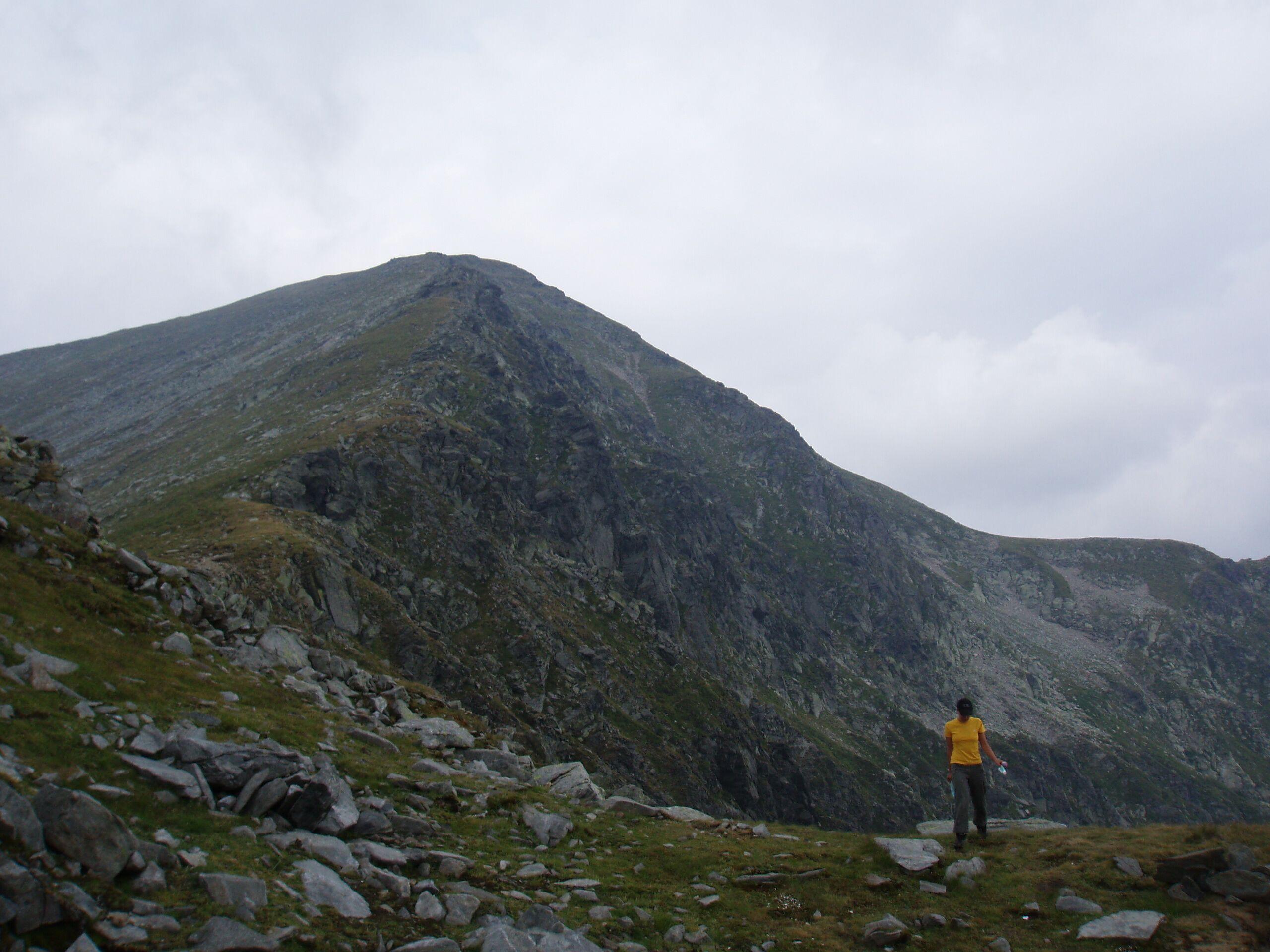

Highest point
- Elevation: 2,519 m (8,264 ft)
- Prominence: 2,103 m (6,900 ft)
- Listing: Ultra
- Coordinates: 45°20′28″N 23°32′26″E

Geography
- Location within Romania
- Country: Romania
- Region(s): Oltenia, Transylvania
- Counties: Gorj and Hunedoara
- Parent range: Parâng Mountains, Southern Carpathians

Parângu Mare (Romanian pronunciation: [paˈrɨŋ̩ɡu ˈmare], "Big Parângu") is a mountain peak in Romania. At 2,519 m (8,264 ft) above sea level, it is the highest peak of the Parâng Mountains, located in the Parâng Mountains group of the Southern Carpathians. It straddles the border of the Romanian counties of Gorj and Hunedoara. It is the most prominent peak in Romania (2,103 m (6,900 ft)), its parent mountain being Gerlachovský štít ((2,655 m (8,711 ft)) in Slovakia.

== Mountains ==
- Parâng Mountains (Munții Parâng)
- Șureanu Mountains (Munții Șureanu/Munții Sebeșului)
- Cindrel Mountains (Munții Cindrel/Munții Cibinului)
- Lotru Mountains (Munții Lotrului; literally: Mountains of the Thief)
- Căpățâna Mountains (Munții Căpățânii; literally: Mountains of the Head or Mountains of the Skull)

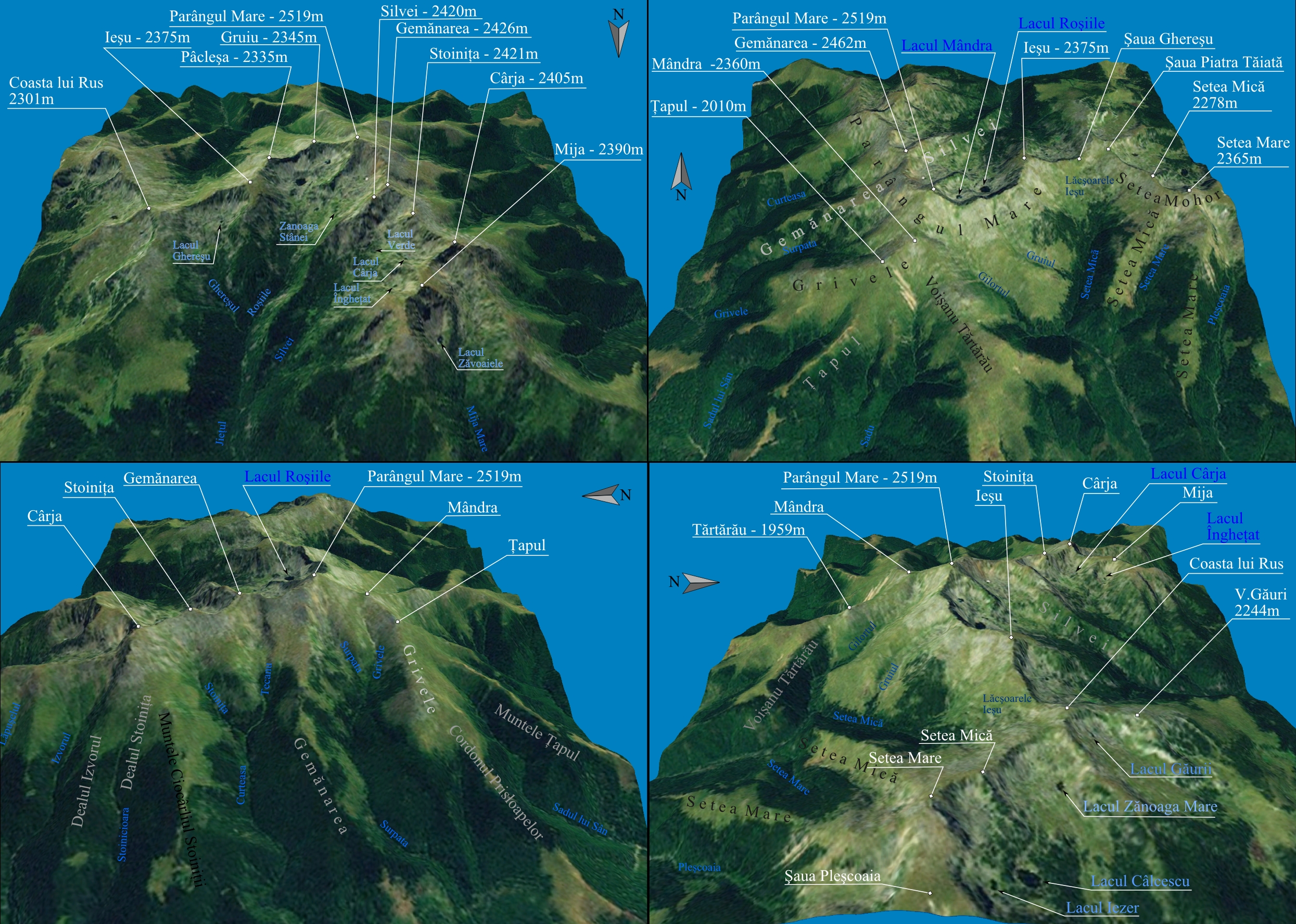
Parângu Mare 3D

== See also ==
- Parâng Mountains group
- Carpathian Mountains
- Retezat-Godeanu Mountains group
- Făgăraș Mountains group
- Rânca
