= Transalpina =

Transalpina can refer to:

- Gallia Transalpina, a Roman province
- Wallachia, a medieval state
- Bohinj Railway, Transalpina - Bohinj Railway in Slovenia
- Transalpina (DN67C), a Trans-Carpathian Road in Romania
