= Prejba River =

Prejba River may refer to the following rivers in Romania:

- Prejba, a tributary of the Sadu in Sibiu County
- Prejba, a tributary of the Lotrioara in Sibiu County
