= Sterpu River =

Sterpu River may refer to:

- Sterpu, another name for the upper course of the Lotrioara in Sibiu County, Romania
- Sterpu River (Olt), in Olt County, Romania
