= Rânca =

Coordinates: 45.291337°N 23.688927°E

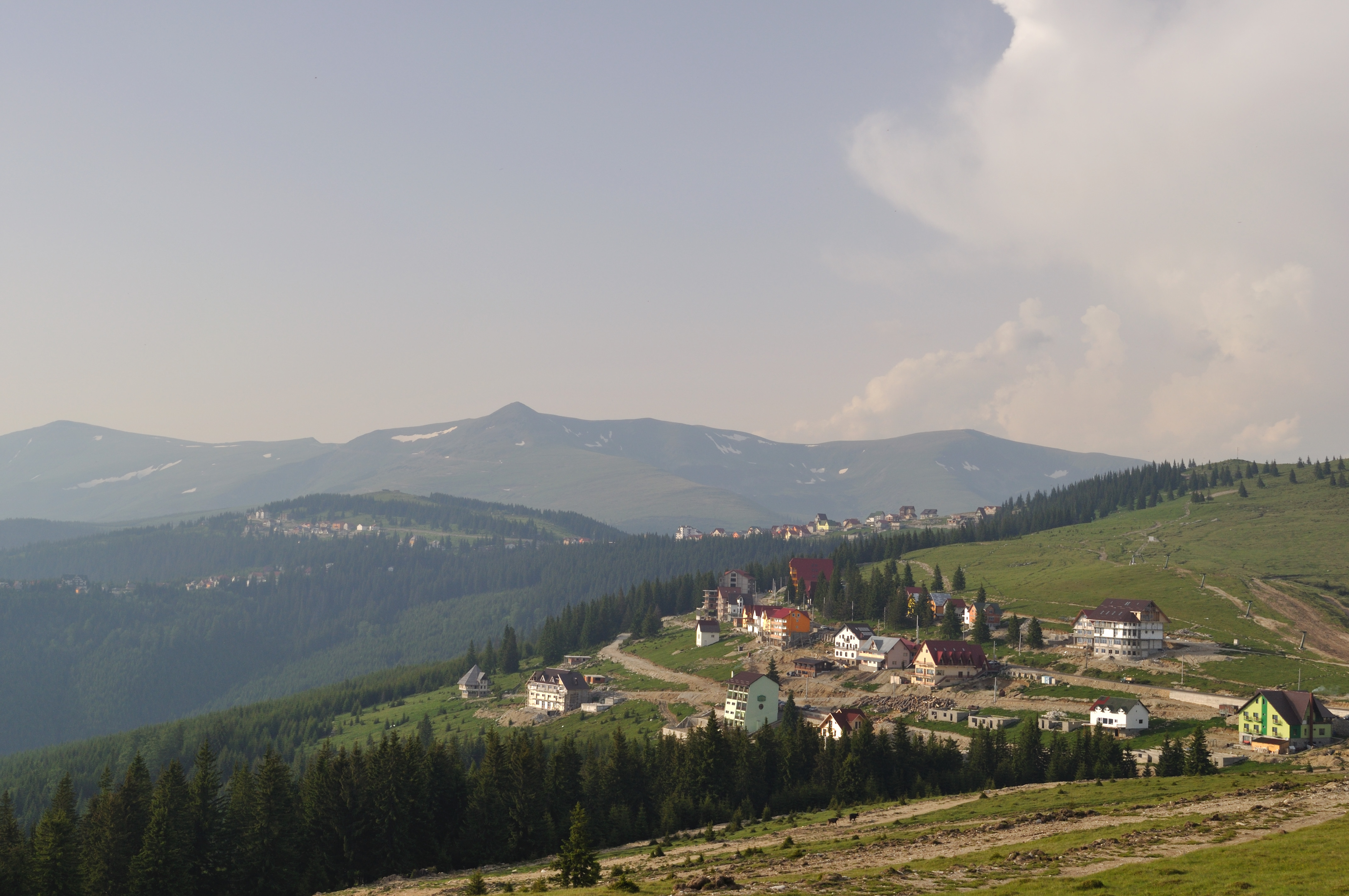
Rânca and Transalpina Road - sight from Păpușa Peak (Parâng Mountains), 2135 m. alt.

Rânca (Romanian pronunciation: [ˈrɨŋka]) is a recently developed Romanian resort, located at 1,600 meters (5,250 ft) elevation, at the foothill of Păpuşa Peak in the Parâng Mountains.

It is located 17.9 kilometers away from Novaci, Gorj County, after passing on the Transalpina (DN67C) road through the Parâng Mountains. There are views of the Parângu Mare peak and, when the weather is clear, one can see Peleaga peak of the Retezat Mountains. During the winter, there are more than five ski slopes open ranging from low to increased difficulty.

There is a variety of accommodations, ranging from hotels to small family businesses. The shops that can be found in Rânca can provide supplies of food and some other necessities to backpackers and bikers.

Every year in September on the Trasalpina road between Novaci and Rânca, the Rânca Stage of the National Rally Championship of Hill Climb is held.
