= Romstrade =

Romanian construction company

- Company type: Privately held
- Industry: Construction
- Founded: 1994
- Headquarters: Bucharest, Romania
- Key people: Ion Bogdan Trasculescu (CEO)
- Services: Building construction and civil engineering; infrastructure construction; tunnelling; facility management
- Revenue: €268 million (2009)
- Net income: €31.6 million (2009)
- Number of employees: 1,225 (2009)
- Website: www.romstrade.ro

Romstrade is a construction company based in Bucharest, Romania which specialises in building construction and civil engineering, infrastructure construction, and facility management. In 2009 Romstrade was the largest construction company in Romania with a revenue of €268 million.

Almost all of Romstrade's business is conducted in Romania. An international branch of the company was started in 2009 with the opening of an office in one of the largest cities in Iraq, Arbil the capital of Iraqi Kurdistan. The company is a member of the Romstrade Group which also includes the charter airline Direct Aero Services and the low-cost airline Blue Air, both based in Bucharest.

== History ==
Romstrade was founded by Nelu Iordache in Adunații-Copăceni, a commune in Giurgiu County, Southern Romania, in 1994 . At first the company had 40 employees and was involved mainly in road construction and maintenance. However, it diversified with time to include building construction, airport maintenance, and civil engineering. Since 1999 the company is actively involved in infrastructure works commissioned by the Romanian Government, including construction and rehabilitation works all over the country of around 700 kilometres (430 mi) of roads and 300 streets.

== Projects ==
Important projects for the company include construction and rehabilitation on several important Romanian roads like DN7, DN1, DN1A, DN73, DN65, DN21, DN2, DN66, DN67C, and DN7A, as well as roads in Bucharest, Voluntari, Ploieşti, Timișoara, Deva and Giurgiu. The most important project of the company is the €385 million rehabilitation of 148 kilometres (92 mi) of DN67C between Bengești-Ciocadia and Sebeş, also called Transalpina, which is the highest road in Romania with a peak elevation of 2,145 metres (7,037 ft). The company is also involved in the construction of a 35 kilometres (22 mi) section of highway in the Iraqi Kurdistan.

Romstrade is also involved in airport construction and maintenance. In March 2010 the company indirectly leased the Bacău International Airport for a period of 34 years through another company in the group. Also in February 2010 the company expressed an intention of building a new airport in the Adunaţii-Copăceni commune on a 200 hectares (490 acres) plot of land, the entire project being worth €150-200 million.
