= Transalpina (DN67C) =

Road in Romania

Coordinates: 45.3355°N 23.6752°E

National Road 67C
- Drumul Național 67C
- Transalpina
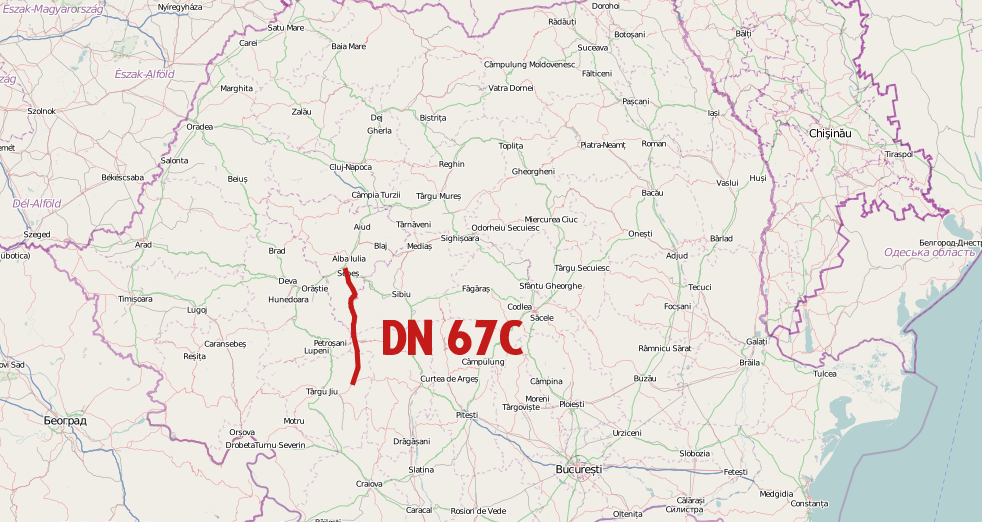

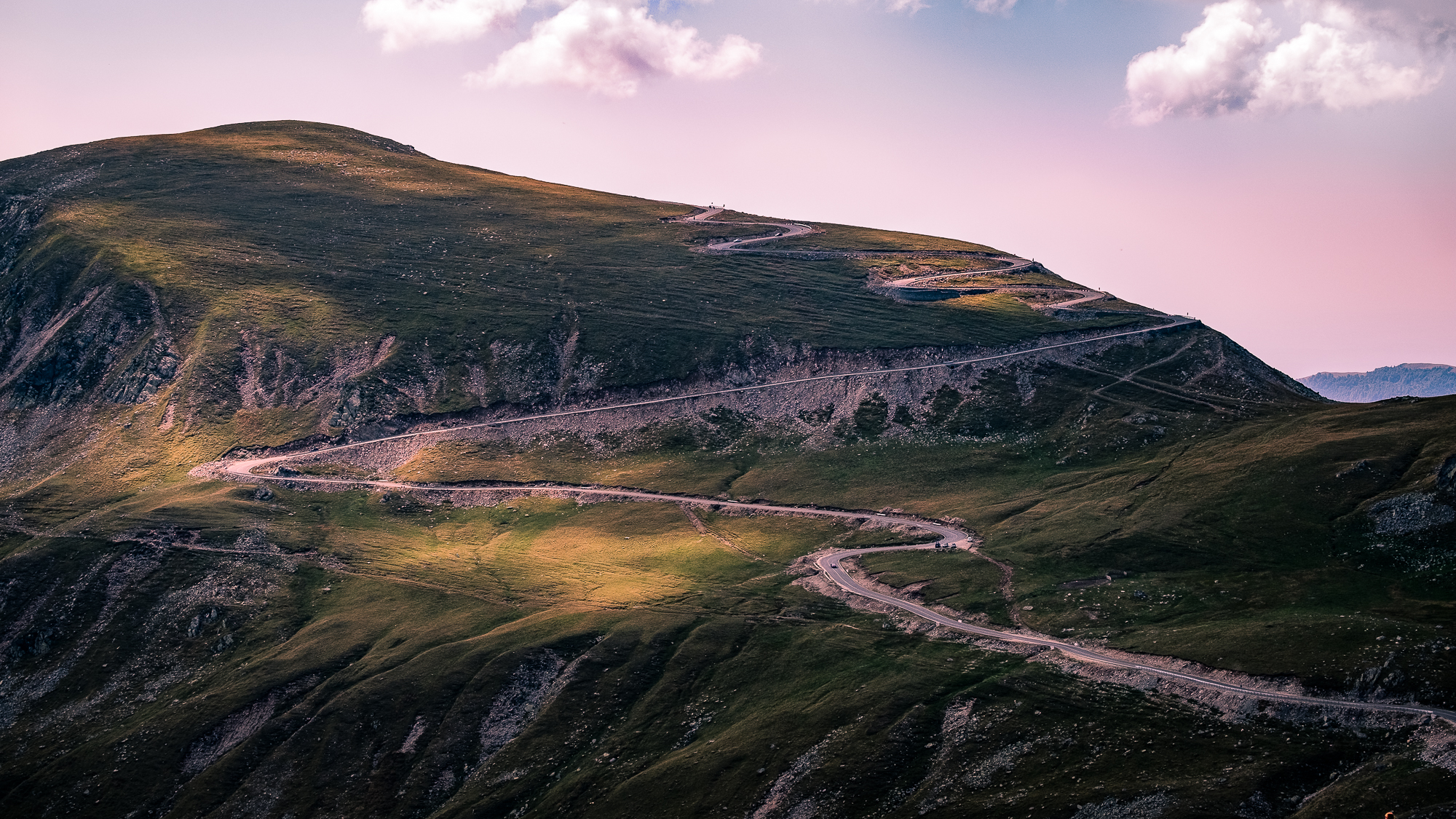

Route information
- Maintained by Compania Națională de Autostrăzi și Drumuri Naționale din România
- Length: 148 km (92 mi)

Major junctions
- From: Novaci
- To: Sebeș

Location
- Country: Romania
- Major cities: Novaci, Sebeș

Highway system
- Roads in Romania; Highways

The Transalpina or DN67C is a 148 km national road located in the Parâng Mountains group, Southern Carpathians of Romania, one of the highest roads of the Carpathian Mountains. It connects Novaci, south of Parâng Mountains, to Sebeș in the north. It is the highest road in Romania, having the highest point in Urdele Pass (at 2,145 m). Transalpina traverses four counties – Gorj, Vâlcea, Sibiu, Alba – crossing the Parâng Mountains from south to north. The highest altitude is reached on a segment of about 20 km (12 mi), in Vâlcea County, passing a short distance from the peaks of Dengheru (2,084 m), Păpușa (2,136 m), Urdele (2,228 m), Iezer (2,157 m), and Muntinu (2,062 m).

Transalpina is a Latin name, used in old Latin texts of Țara Românească, meaning "the country beyond the mountains".

Being a high altitude mountain road it is closed during the winter, it stays open from mid May to mid October (depending on the weather) and only during daytime (08:00–20:00).

== History ==
The beginnings of this road are unclear, some sources claim that it was first built by the Roman legions during the wars with the Dacians, which is why it is listed on the history maps as the "Roman strategic corridor IV".

A local legend says that at the end of the 18th century, beginning of 19th century, each family participated in the construction of a part of this road, depending on physical and financial possibilities.

According to other sources the road was rebuilt and paved by the Germans during World War I, for military reasons, but it was very little used.

What is certain is that this route, known as Poteca Dracului (Devil's Path), was originally a mountain path, used by shepherds from the Mărginimea Sibiului to cross the mountains with sheep herds in Țara Românească (Wallachia).

In his work, Istoria Olteniei supt austriaci (1718–1739), Constantin C. Giurescu shows that as early as 1731 the Austrian authorities proposed the construction of a Transcarpathian road on the path of the old transhumance route linking Transylvania with Oltenia.

Given the lessons of the First World War, King Carol II wanted that the Romanian Land Forces would have a strategic road for mountain artillery, pulled by horses, which could be traversed by troops moving between Wallachia and Transylvania. To establish a route for the road, Prime Minister Gheorghe Tătărescu went on the mountain from Novaci to Lotru, accompanied by 20 horsemen from Novaci and led by the teacher Ion D. Giurgiulan. Following this, Tătărăscu inaugurated the road construction works on the Novaciului plateau. The restoration works took place between 1934 and 1939; King Carol II attended the inauguration of the road in 1939, accompanied by the future King Michael I, as well as Tătărăscu and his wife Arethia. They traveled the entire route in an off-road vehicle. After inauguration, the road was known as Drumul Regal (Royal Road) or Drumul Regelui (King's Road), which replaced the popular name of Poteca Dracului (Devil's Path).

The road was rehabilitated once more during World War II, as the Germans needed access to this road for military reasons. After that, for more than 70 years, the road received little to no maintenance.

A story has it that Nicolae Ceaușescu had the Transfăgărășan Road (DN7C) built during the communist regime just to surpass Transalpina.

Improvement works began in 2008–2009 to transform this spectacular road into a modern single carriageway (148 km), for the high price of 385 millions euros; the job was given to Nelu Iordache Romstrade, most of the total work and money (67%) was given to this company. There were no economic or traffic justification for spending such a large amount (2.6 millions per km) as the road is of limited use (maximum of 6-month's a year) because of high altitude weather and there was already a national road (DN7A) crossing the area that could be used 12-month's a year (DN7A is at a lower altitude on a SE-NW axis) that needed only 10% of the amount spent on Transalpina to be improved. There is also evidence of corruption, one of the names involved is Prime Minister Ludovic Orban, then (2007–2008) Minister of Transport, and Varujan Vosganian, among many others.

Currently the road is "work in progress", with 80% of total construction work being done and 99% of the road has the first asphalt concrete layer.

Transalpina, mostly used by tourists, has speed (maximum 30 km/h) and weight (maximum 7.5 tone) restrictions, it takes a minimum of 3 hours to cross from one end to another by car.

Rânca, a newly developed resort, is located towards the south end of the Transalpina road.

== Gallery ==
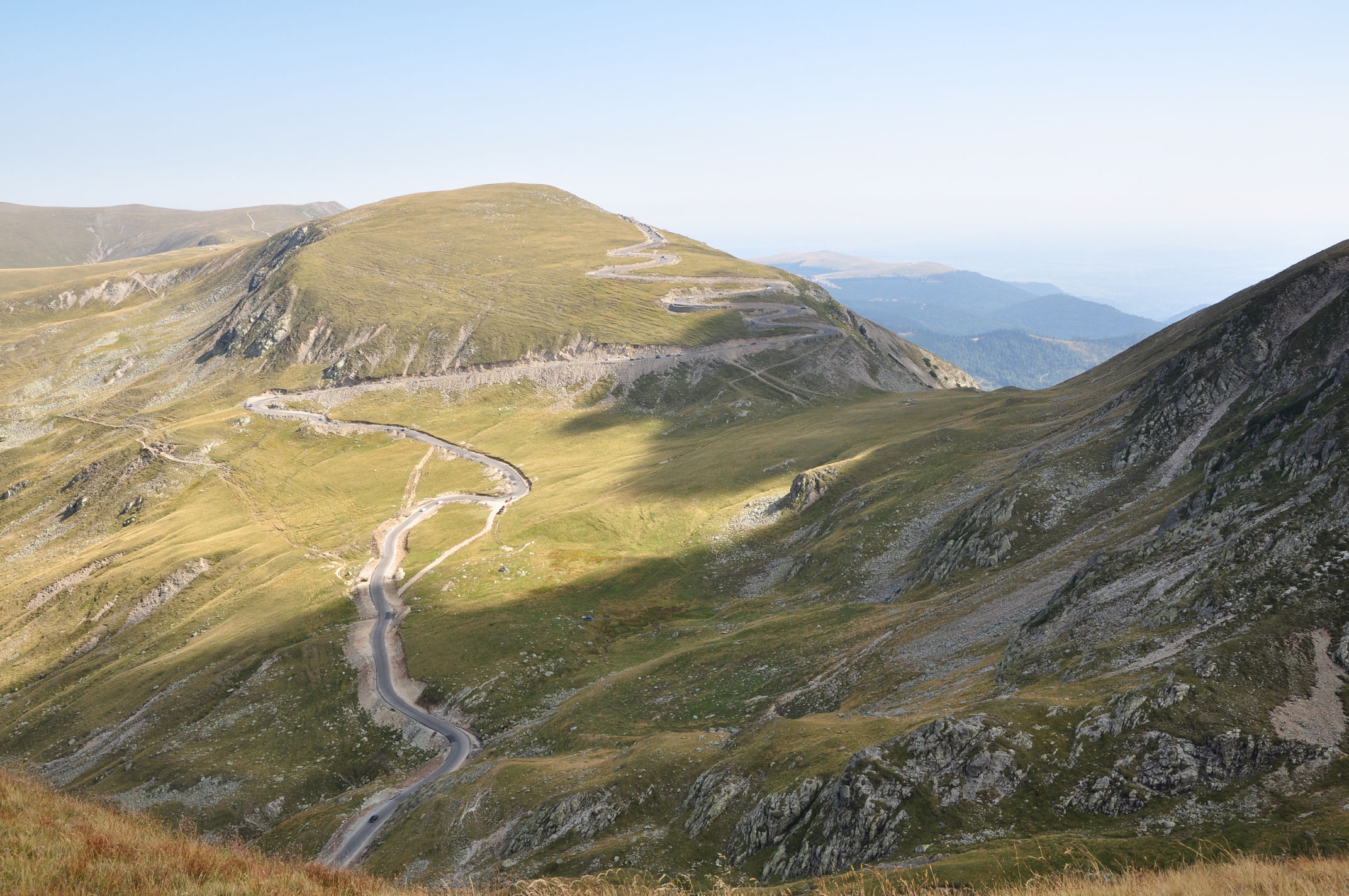

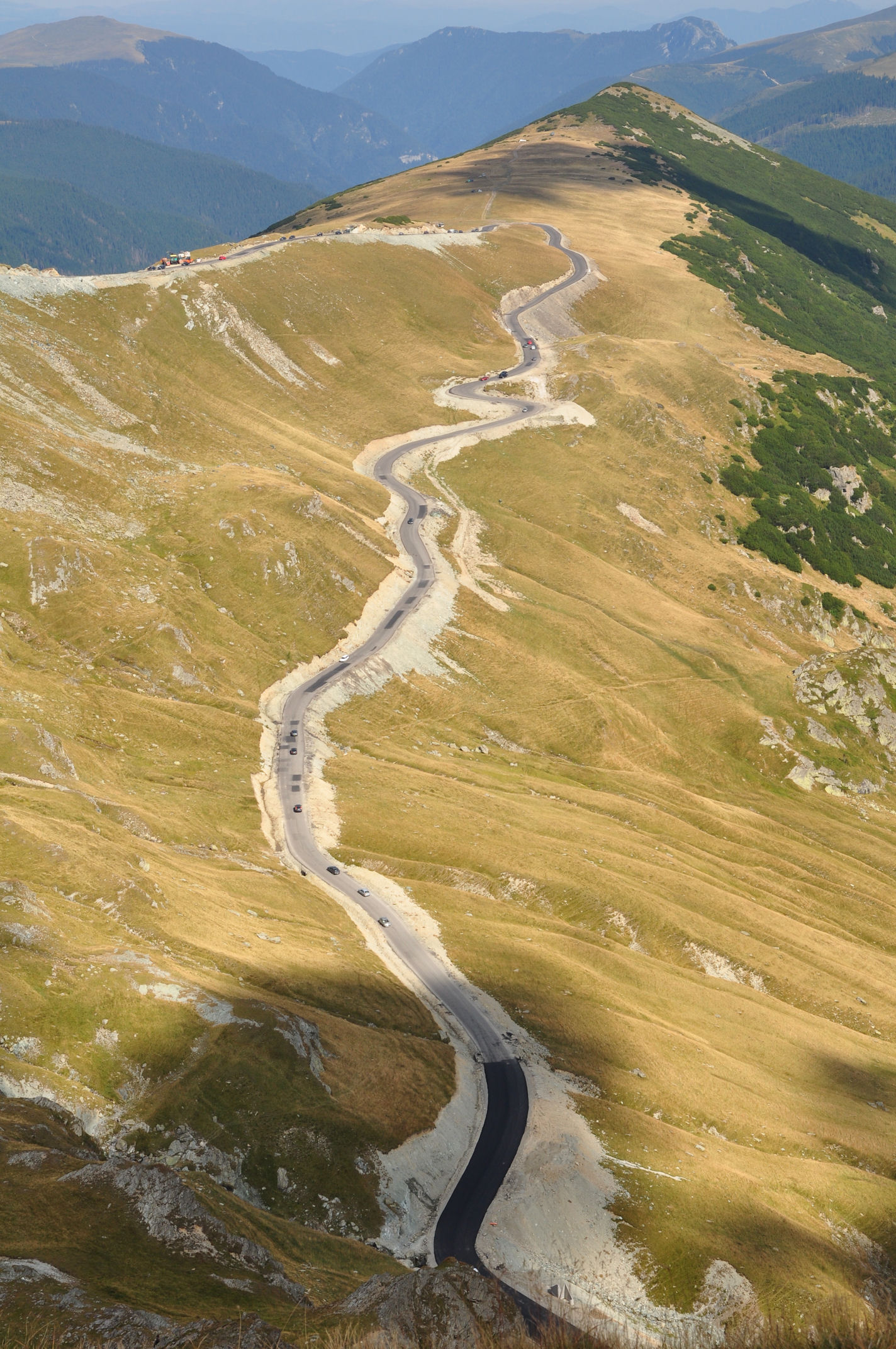

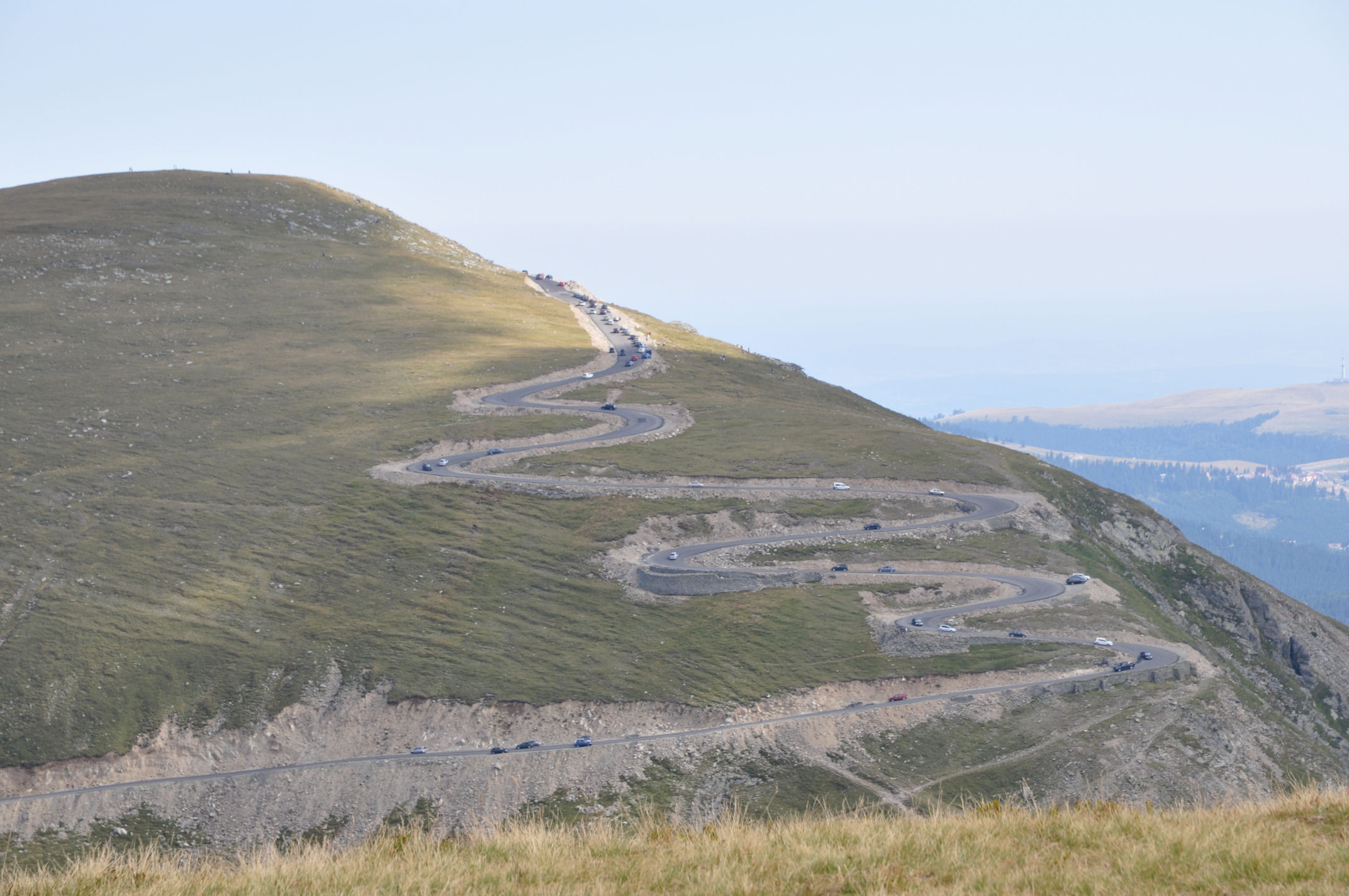

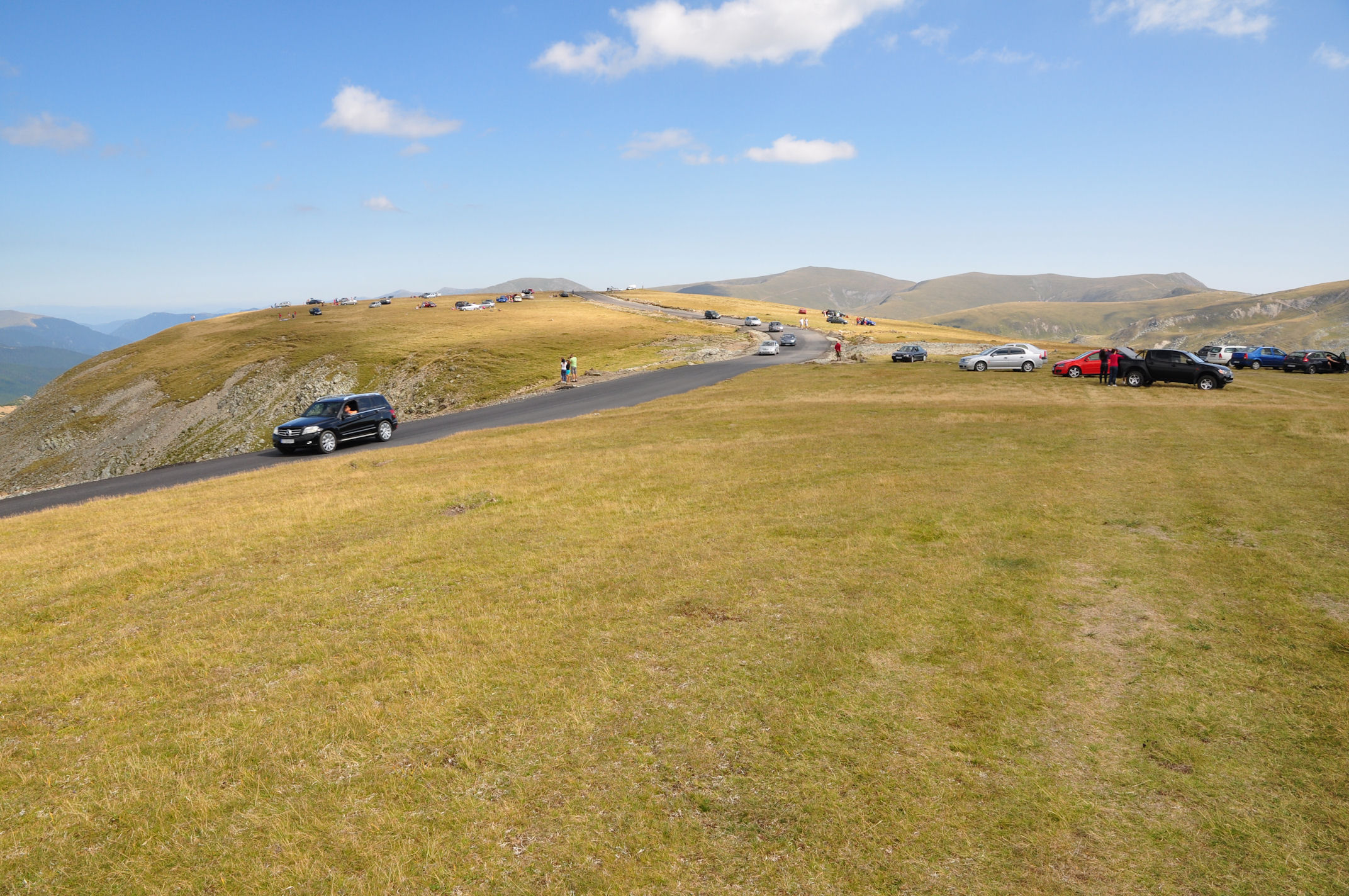

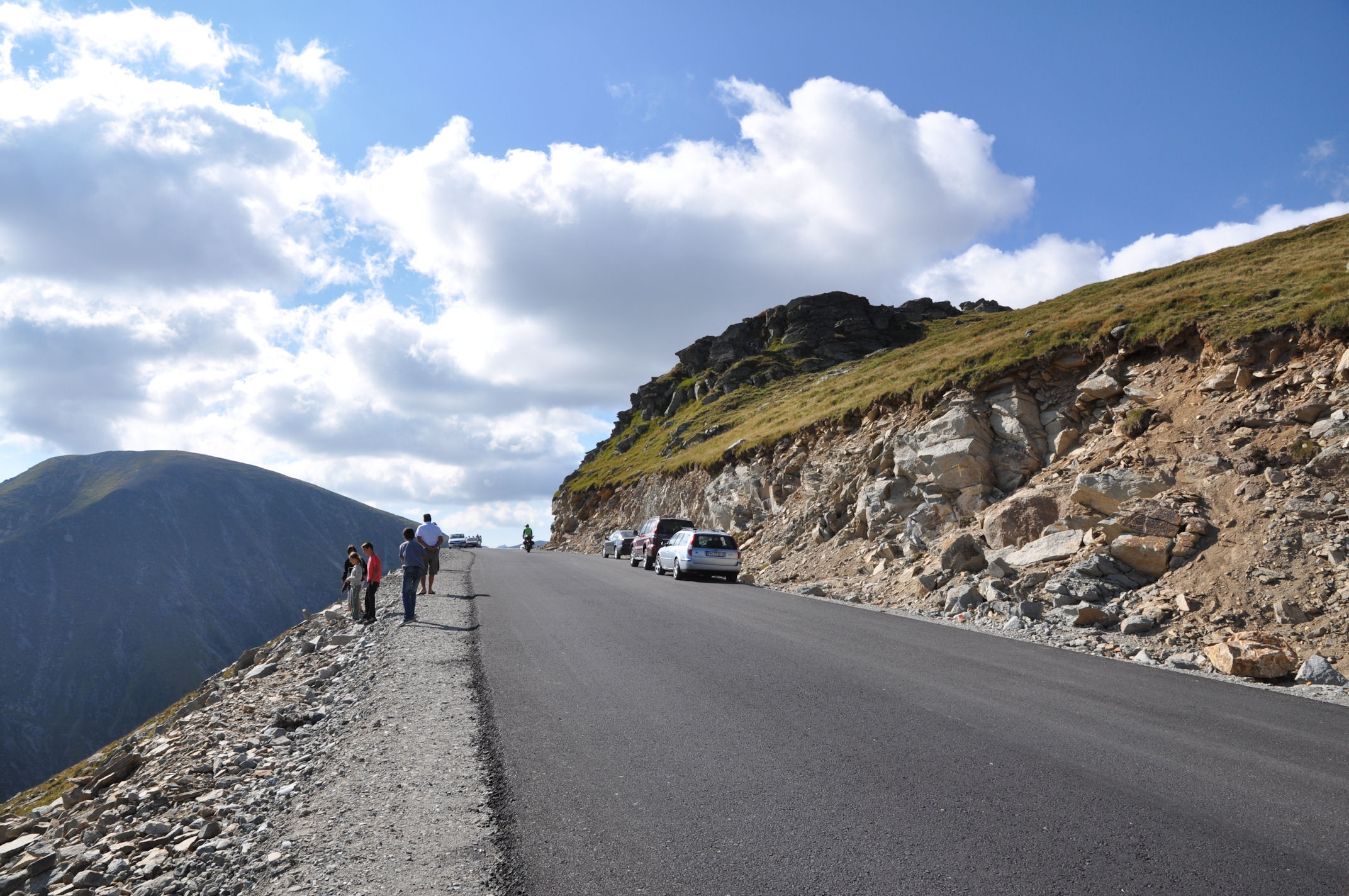

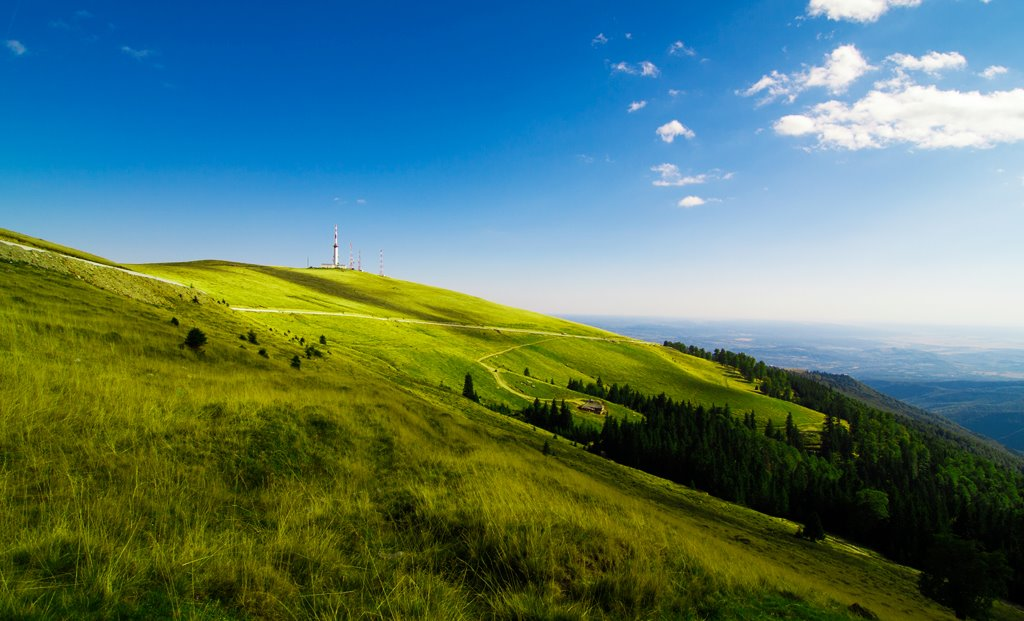

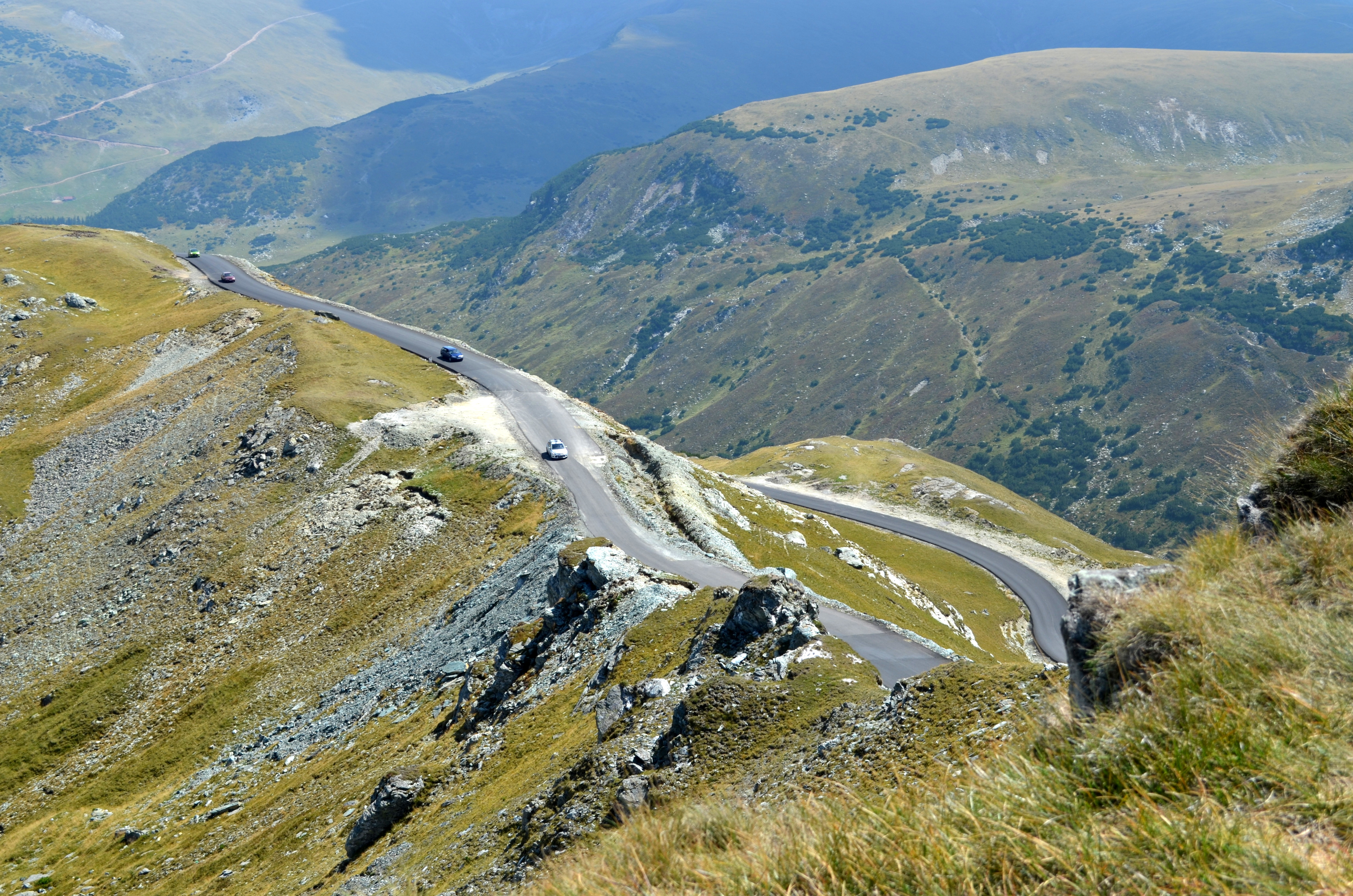

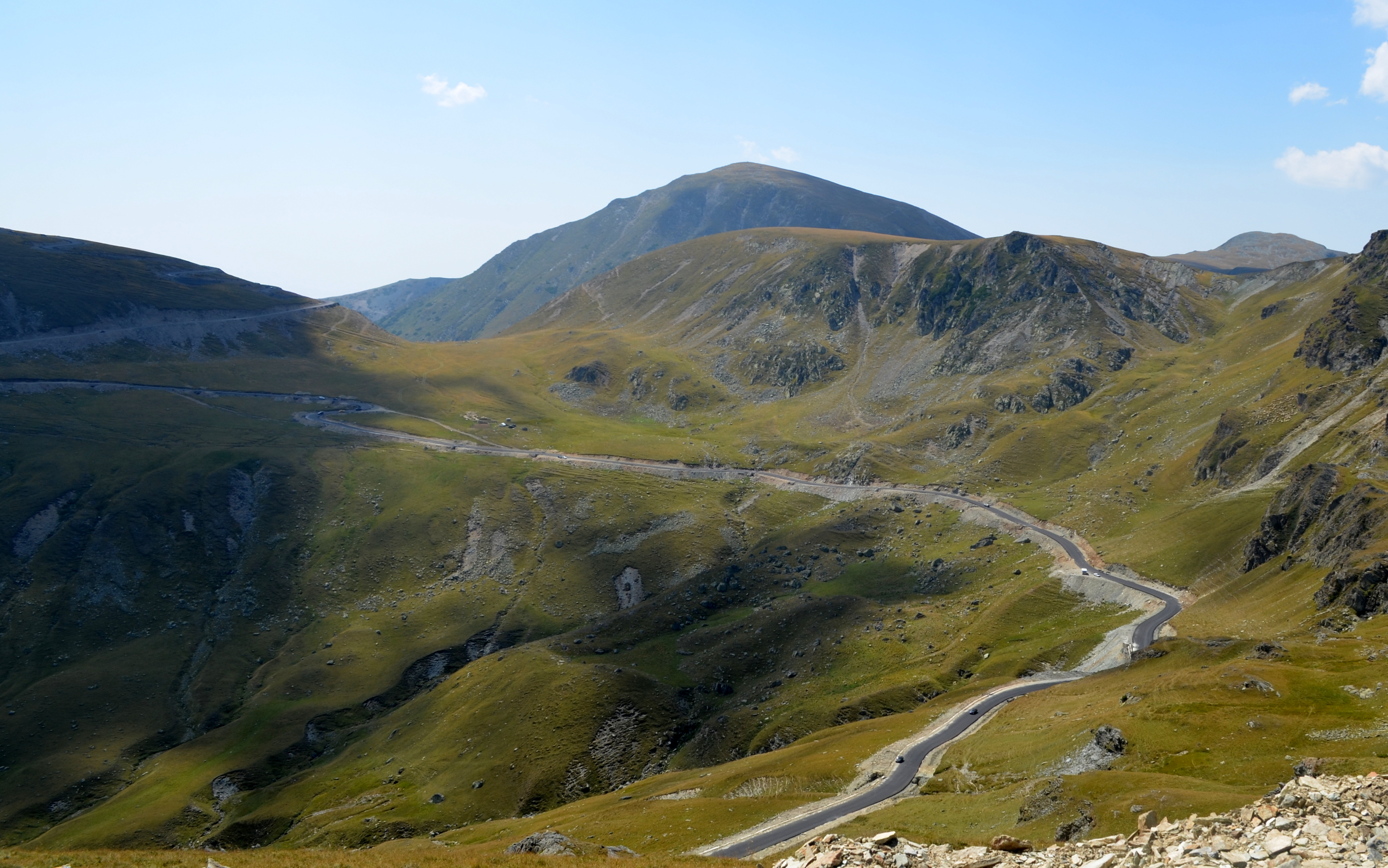

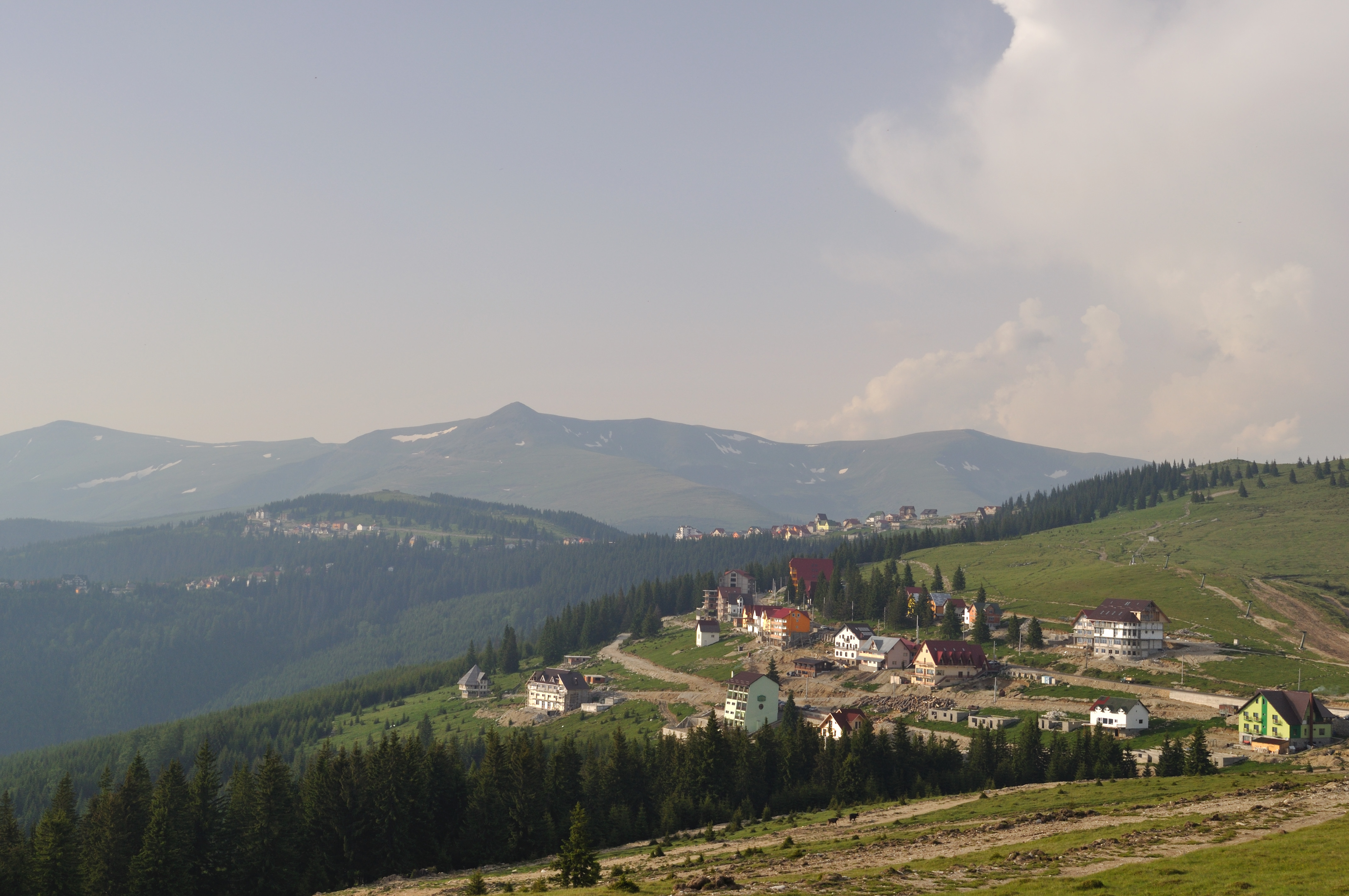

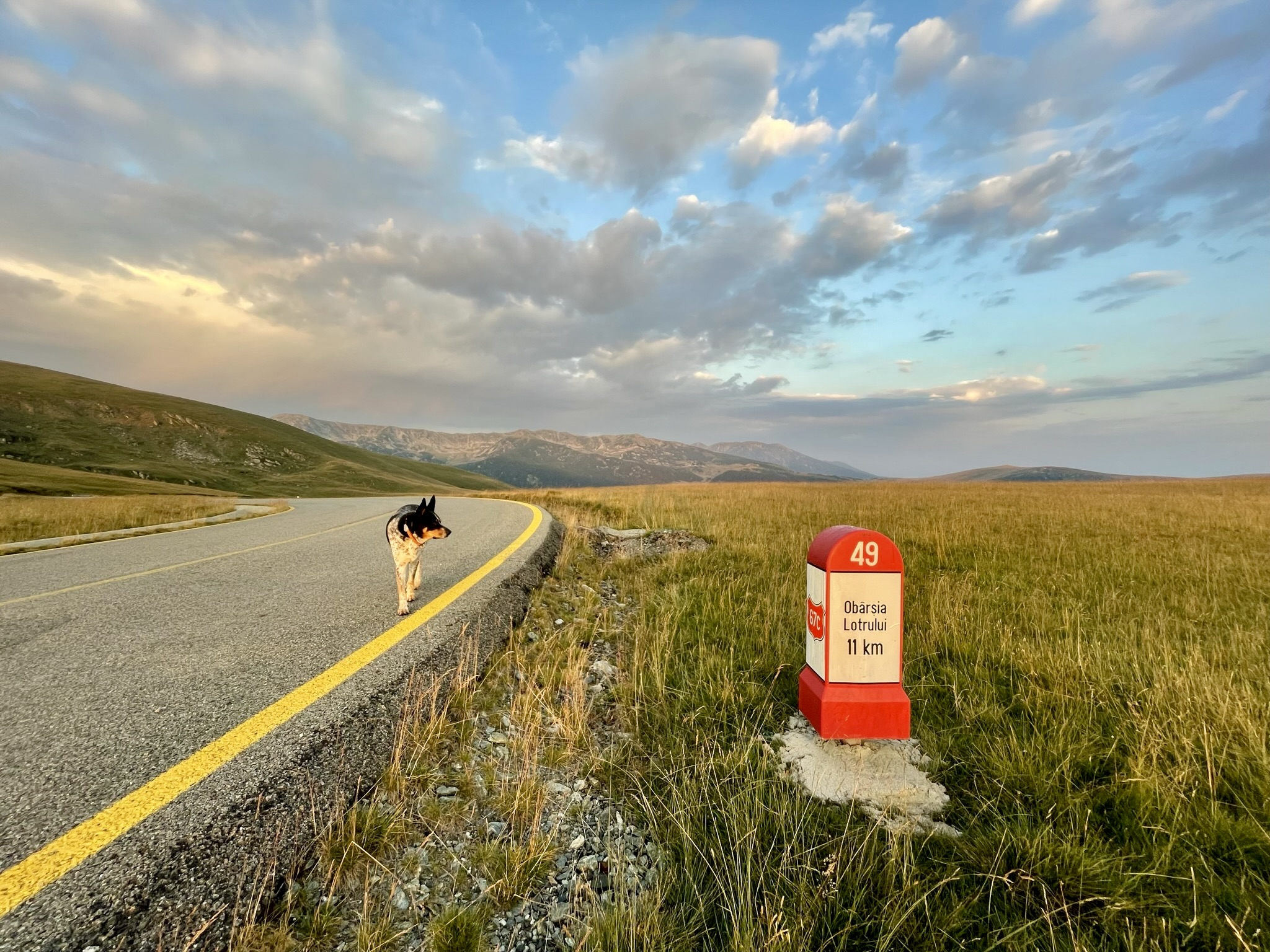

== See also ==
- List of highest paved roads in Europe
- List of mountain passes
