= Parâng Mountains group =

Subgroup of the Southern Carpathian Mountains

Coordinates: 45.3400°N 23.5396°E

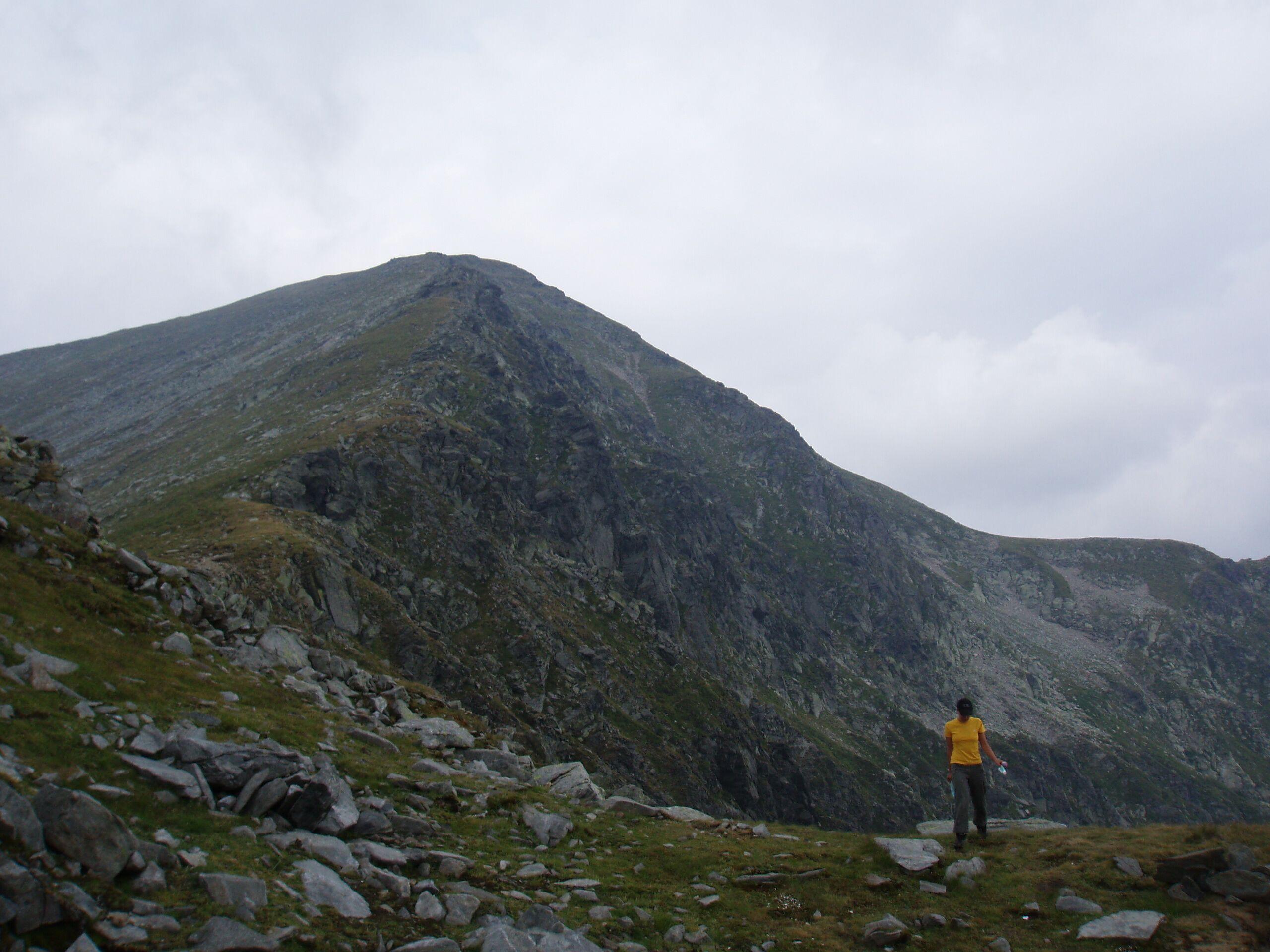
Parângu Mare (2519 m)

The Parâng (Hungarian: Páring-hegység) mountain group is a subgroup of mountains in the Southern Carpathians. It is named after the highest of the mountains in the group, the Parâng Mountains.

== Boundaries ==
The Parâng group is bounded:

- in the east, by the Olt River
- in the west, by the Jiu River

== Mountains ==
- Parâng Mountains (Munții Parâng)
- Șureanu Mountains (Munții Șureanu/M. Sebeșului)
- Cindrel Mountains (Munții Cindrel/M. Cibinului)
- Lotru Mountains (Munții Lotrului; literally: Mountains of the Thief)
- Căpățână Mountains (Munții Căpățânii; literally: Mountains of the Head or Mountains of the Skull)

== See also ==
- Carpathian Mountains
- Retezat-Godeanu Mountains group
- Făgăraș Mountains group
- Parângu Mare peak
- Rânca
