= Parâng Mountains =

Mountains in Romania and Southern Carpathians

Munții Parâng
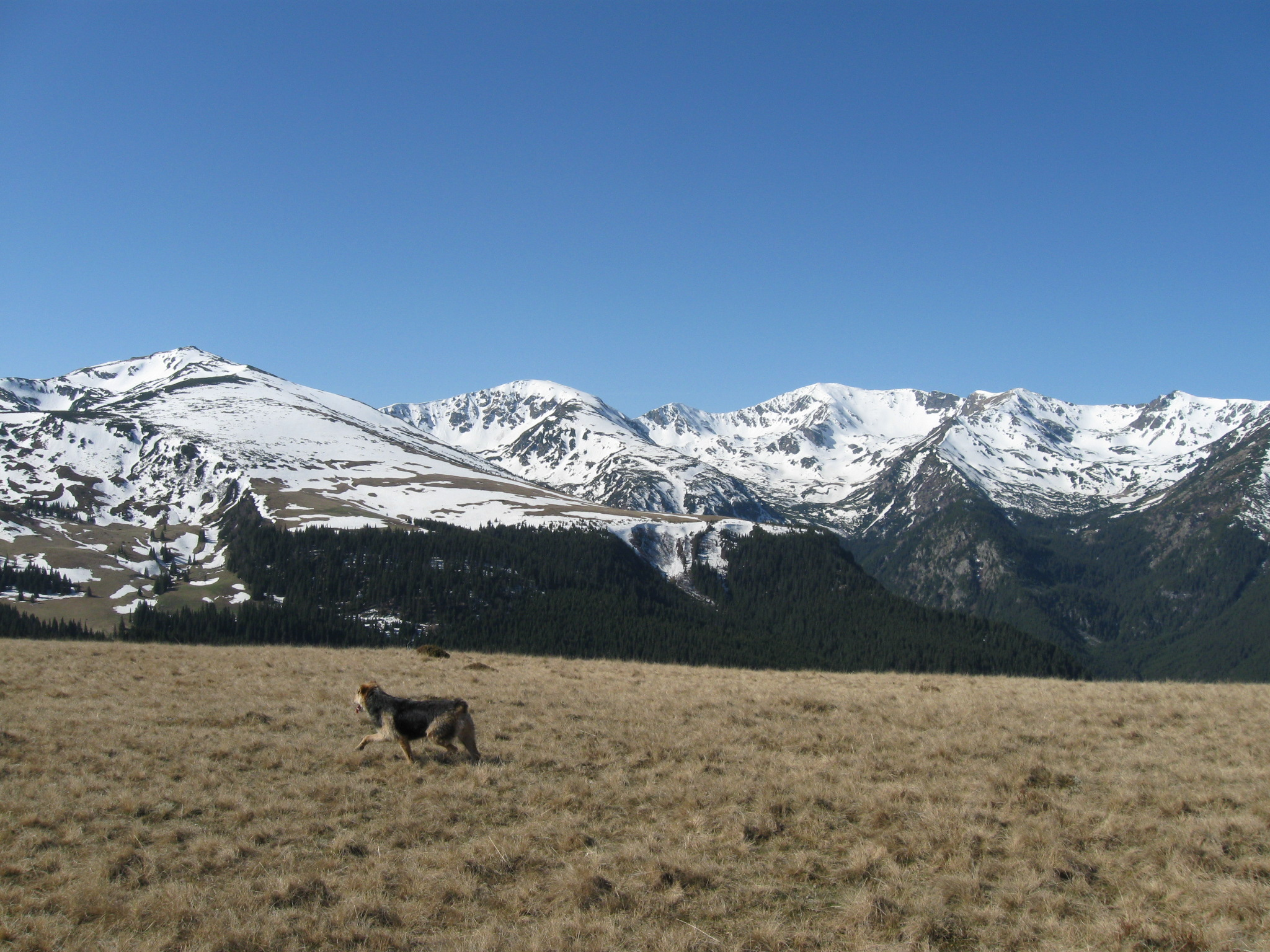
- View of the Parâng Mountains main ridge. The leftmost peak is Găuri while the highest peak (Parângu Mare – 2519m) is visible just to the right of the image center.

Highest point
- Peak: Parângu Mare
- Elevation: 2,519 m (8,264 ft)
- Coordinates: 45°20′24″N 23°32′22.6″E

Geography
- Country: Romania
- Parent range: Southern Carpathians
- Borders on: Alps

Geology
- Orogeny: Alpine orogeny

The Parâng Mountains (Romanian pronunciation: [paˈrɨŋɡ]; Hungarian: Páring-hegység) are one of the highest mountain ridges in Romania and Southern Carpathians, with the highest peak, Parângu Mare, reaching 2,519 m.

== Description ==
The Parâng Mountains are located in the south-western part of the Central-Meridional Carpathians. They are the tallest mountains from the local Parâng-Cindrel mountain group and the second largest mountains in the Romanian Carpathians after the Făgăraș Mountains. They are situated between the Șureanu Mountains (north), Latoriței Mountains (north-east), Căpățânii Mountains (east), Vâlcan Mountains (west) and the Petroșani Depression in the north-west. Located south and east of the city of Petroșani, the Parâng Mountains form the eastern barrier of the Jiu Valley (a plateau 100 kilometers long from east to west and 70-80 kilometers wide from north to south).

== Geology ==
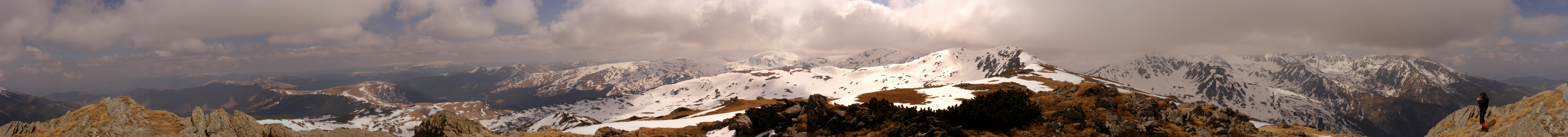
360° panorama of the Parâng mountains– a mosaic of 23 individual images, taken from the Găuri peak (2244m). The peak to which the ridge just right of the image center leads is Piatra Tăiată (2255m). On the right, half of the Ghereșu saddle (2113m) is visible, leading up to the main Parâng ridge, of which the first peak, Lesu (2375m) is barely visible because of the cloud cover. Just to the right, but almost entirely obscured by clouds, is the talles peak from the mountain group: Parângu Mare (2519m). On the left of the Piatra Tăiată peak the Setea Mohor main ridge is visible, with the two most prominent peaks in this image being (from right to left): Setea Mică (2278m) and Setea Mare (2365m).

The Parâng Mountains consist predominantly of crystalline rocks, peripherally covered with patches of sediments from the Paleozoic, Mesozoic (massive limestone, conglomerates) and Cenozoic eras, mixed with large areas of granite outcrops. On the southern slope, sedimentary rocks from the Mesozoic era can be found, more exactly massive limestone from the Jurassic period. The newest rocks are found on the southern frame of the mountains and in the north-west, where it is bordered by the Petrosani Depression. The nature of the rocks favored the emergence of bulk, rounded ridges, separated by deep valleys. The mountains present an overall asymmetry, with the northern front more steepen, with short ridges, while the southern facade is less inclined and with longer ridge. Especially in the southern part, the slopes are composed of several steps.

== Climate ==
=== Temperatures ===
Parâng Mountains 3D

The general layout of the main ridge on a west–east axis and its altitudes of over 2000m makes the Parâng mountains an orographic dam in the way of the air masses that flow on the north to north-west and south to south-west directions. Also, the asymmetry of the main ridge, with the steep side to the north, leads to the receiving of different amounts of heat and moisture, more on the southern side. The sun shines approximately 1800–2000 hours/year, the highest temperatures being recorded in July and August. The average annual temperature is 6 °C at the bottom of the mountain and 0 °C at altitudes around 1800m. Above 2000m, the average temperature is below 0 °C. The difference between the recorded average temperatures of the southern and northern slopes is around 1-2 °C.

=== Precipitations ===
The average annual rainfall is between 900 and 1200mm. The most abundant rainfall is recorded around the altitude of 1600m to 1800m. June is the month with the highest precipitations, 110mm at the bottom of the mountain and 160mm at altitudes over 1500m. It snows on average 90 days per year above the altitude of 1500m. The first snow comes during the first half of October, while the last one during the first half of May (above 1500m) or late April at lower altitudes. At high altitudes the snow is present on average for 200 days each year. The thickness of the snow layer depends on the weather conditions, the exposure of the slopes to the winds, exposure to the sun, snowfall etc. At over 1500m, the average thickness is greater than 1m.

=== Wind ===
The wind intensity is high all around the year. Above 2000m, the westers winds are dominant, while below this threshold, the wind direction and intensity are influenced by the mountain relief. Above 2000m, the average wind speed is 8–10 m/s. During the cold season, the wind speed may reach 15 m/s and above on some ridges.

== Flora ==
In close connection with the relief characteristics of the Parâng mountains, the vegetation is clearly shaped into three layers. The first layer is the broadleaf forest, which starts from the bottom of the mountains and goes as high as 1200m (northern slope) and 1400m (southern slope). They are made up of pedunculate oak, European hornbeam, silver birch and, the most common, but mostly spread on the southern slope, the European beech. The second layer mostly extended on the northern and western slopes, between 1000m and 1750m, and is composed of norway spruce forests and, locally, european silver fir. In the Parâng mountains, the tree line is situated between 1600m and 1800m. Above this limit are located the subalpine and Alpine grasslands. The vegetation here is made up of krummholz trees, such as swiss pine, european larch, mountain pine and net-leaved willow, but also mountain cranberry, green alder and bilberry. Also common are grass family members, such as bentgrass, tufted fescue and highland rush. On limestone rich areas, edelweiss can be found.

== Fauna ==
The southern Charpatians fauna is characteristic also to the Parâng mountains. Among mammals, the grey wolf, fox, wild boar, brown bear, eurasian lynx and red deer can be found.

== Image gallery ==
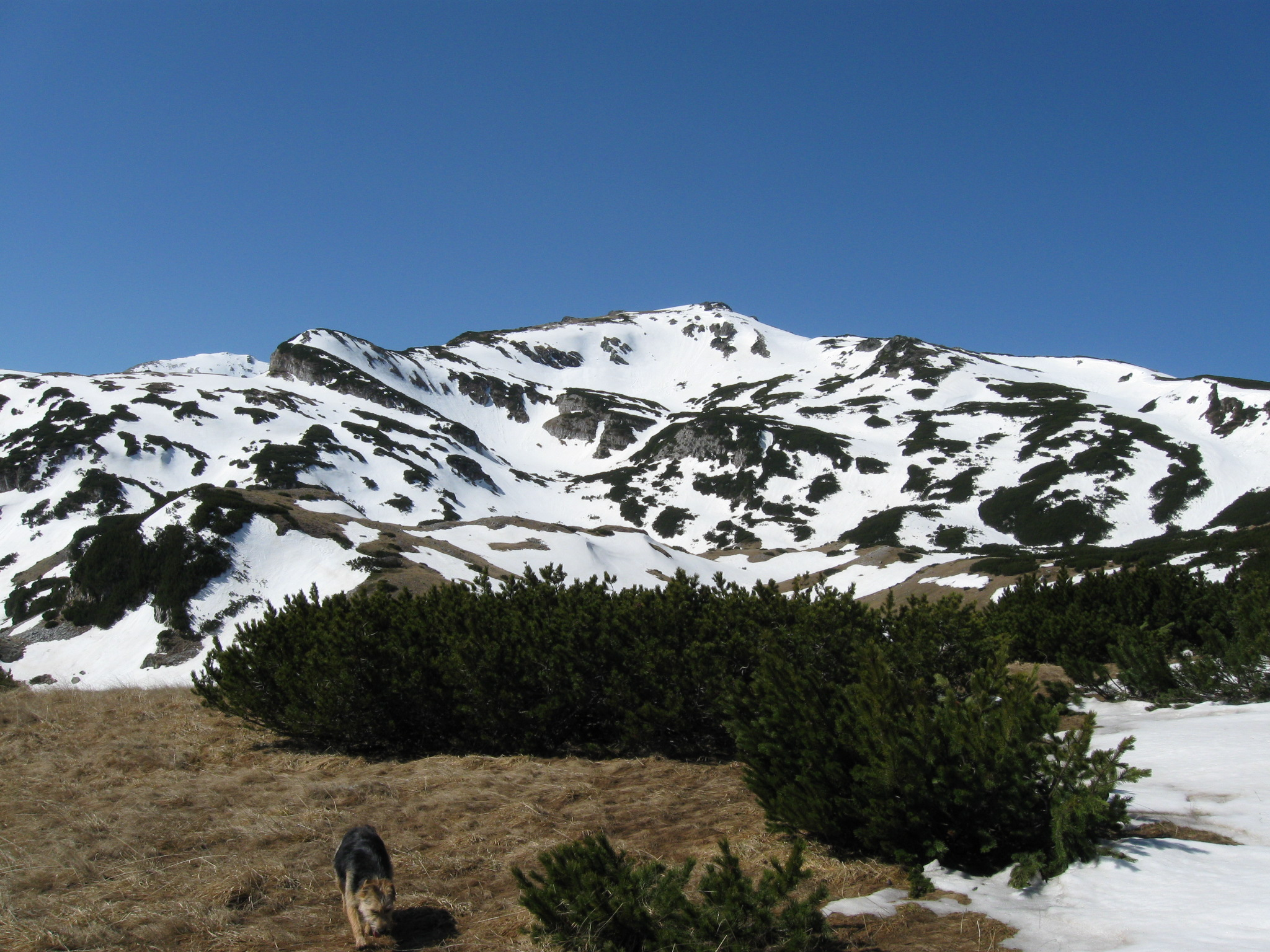
Găuri peak

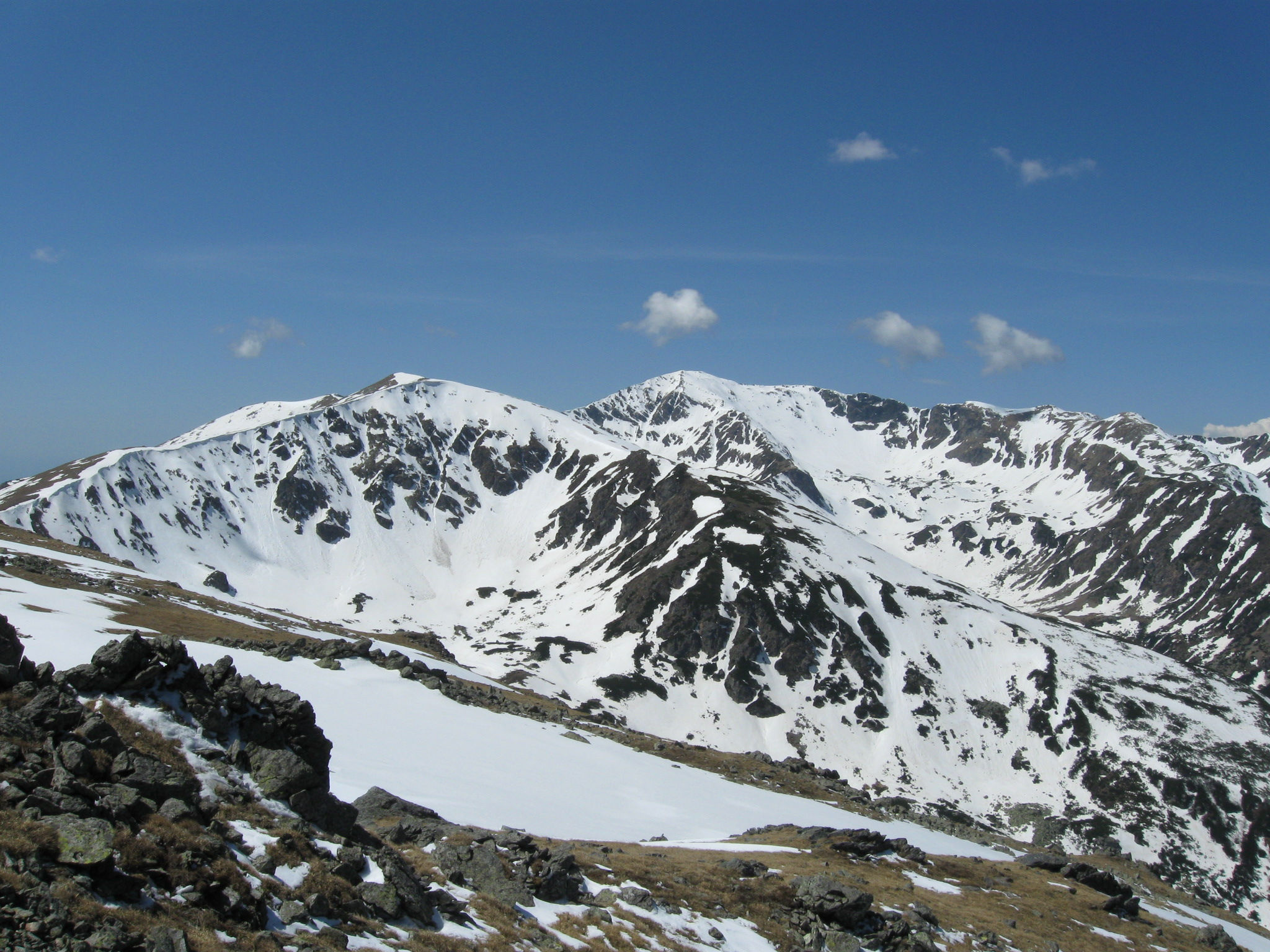
Parângu Mare peak view from Găuri peak

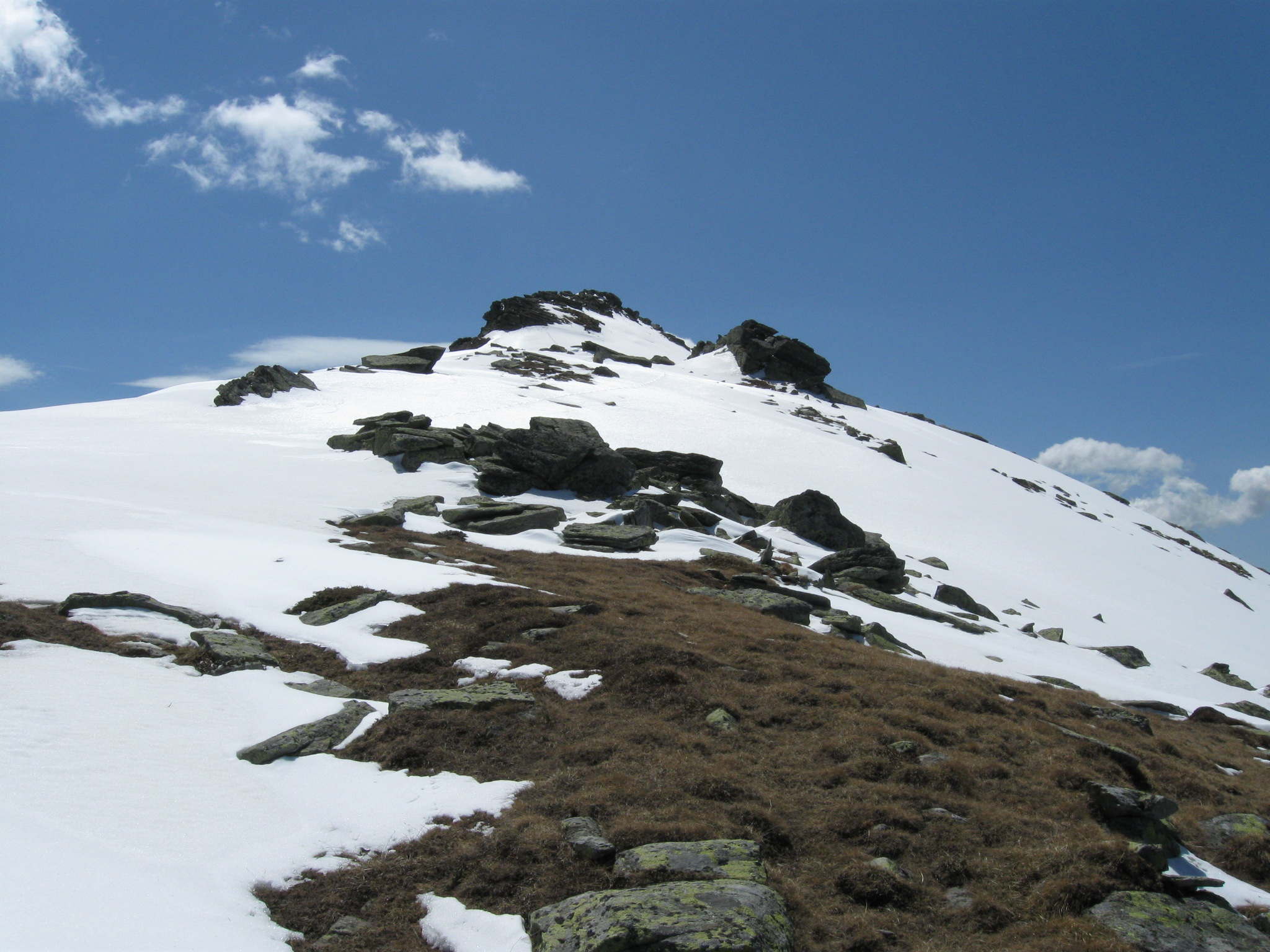
Northern view of the Coasta lui Rus peak

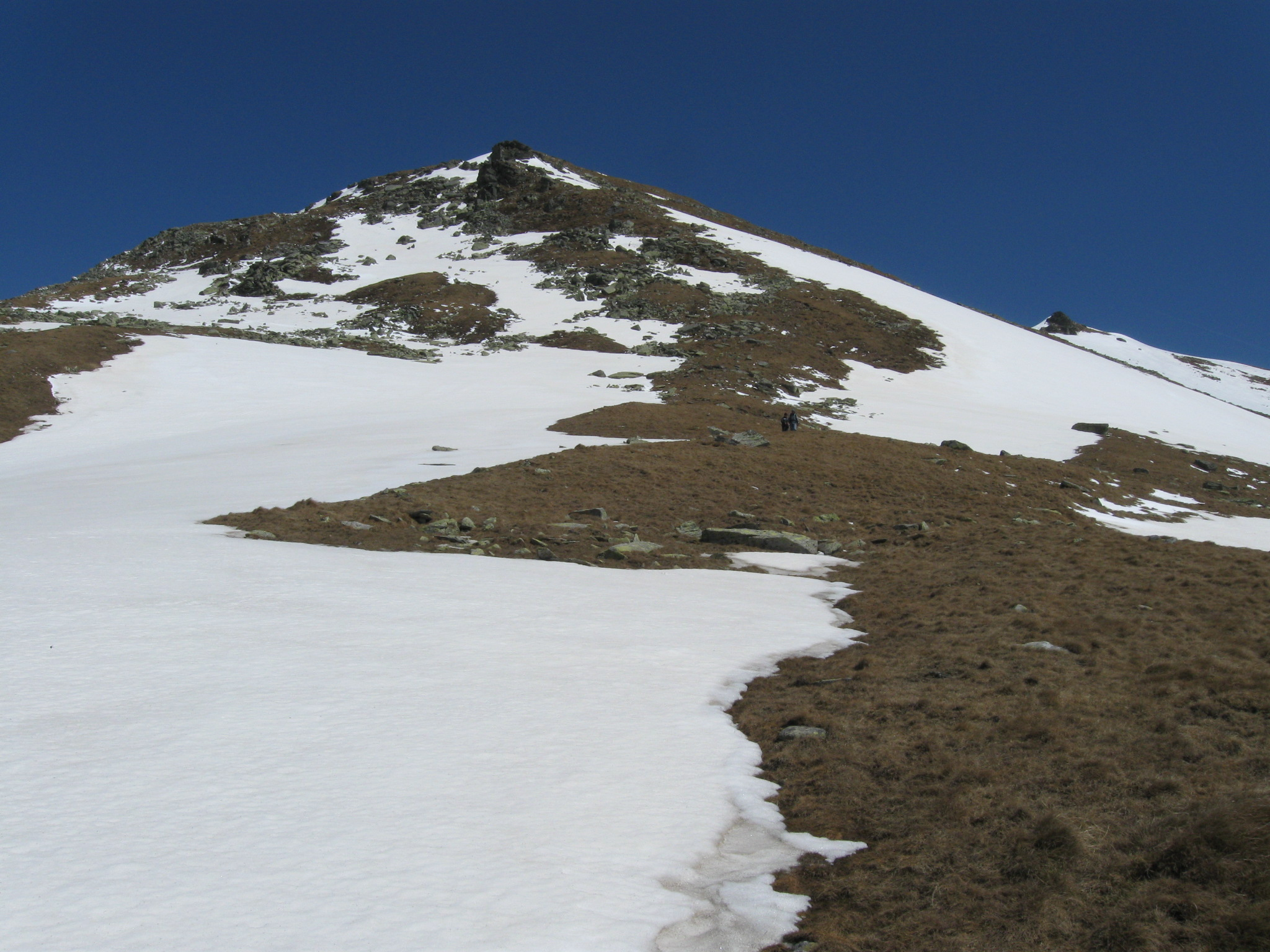
Western view of the Coasta lui Rus peak

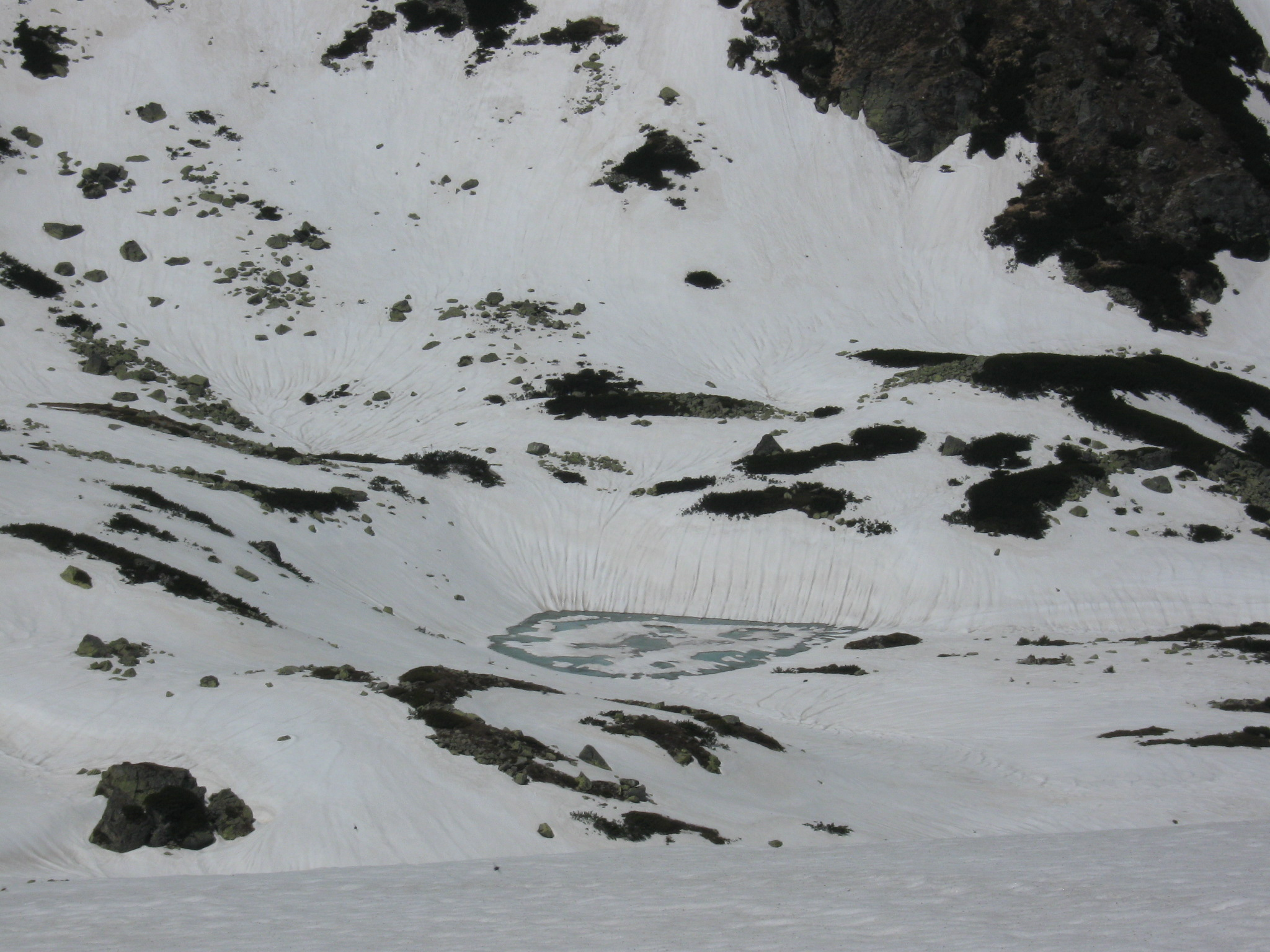
Ghereșu glacier lake

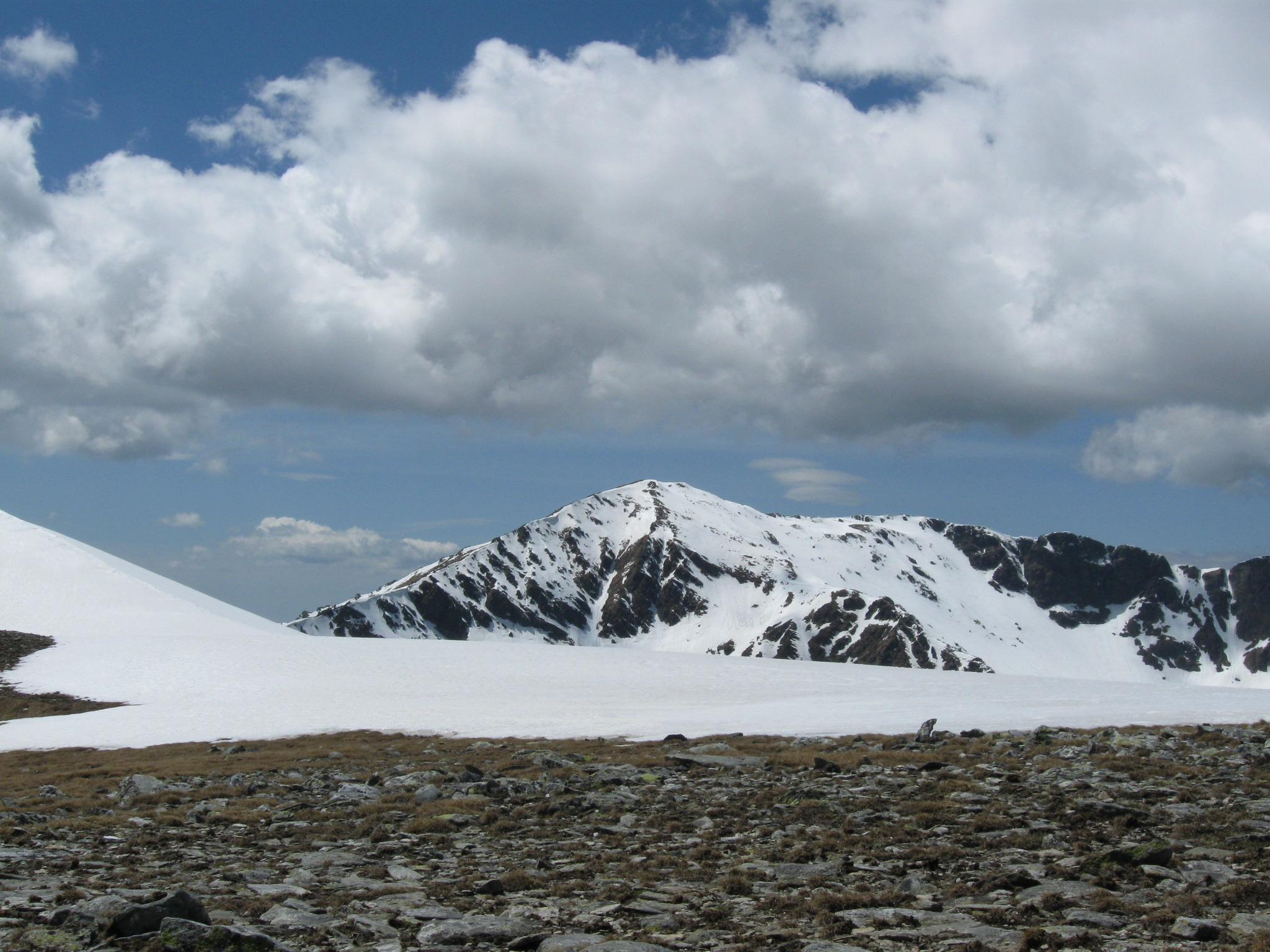
Parângu Mare peak

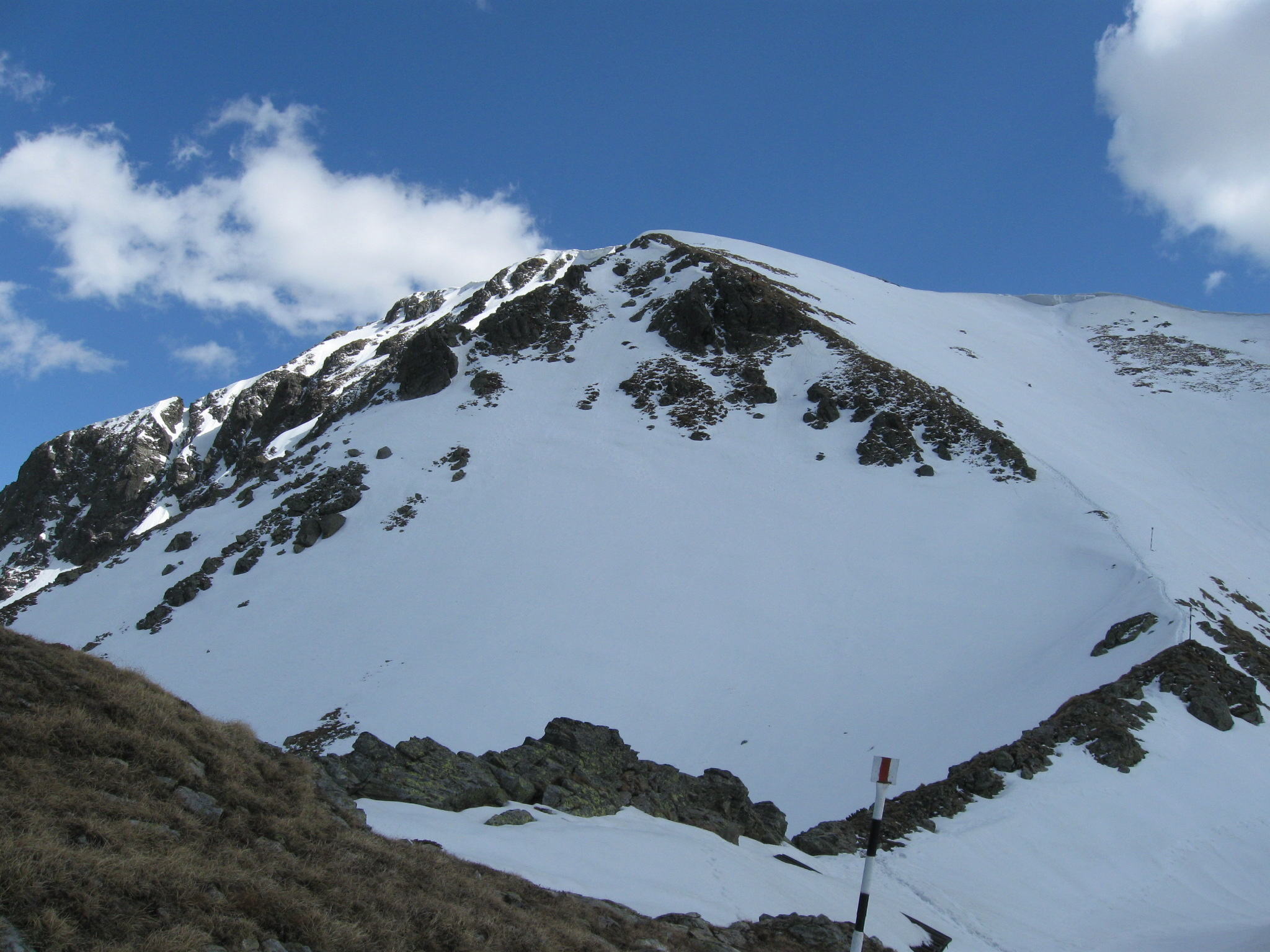
Cârja (2405m), second highest peak

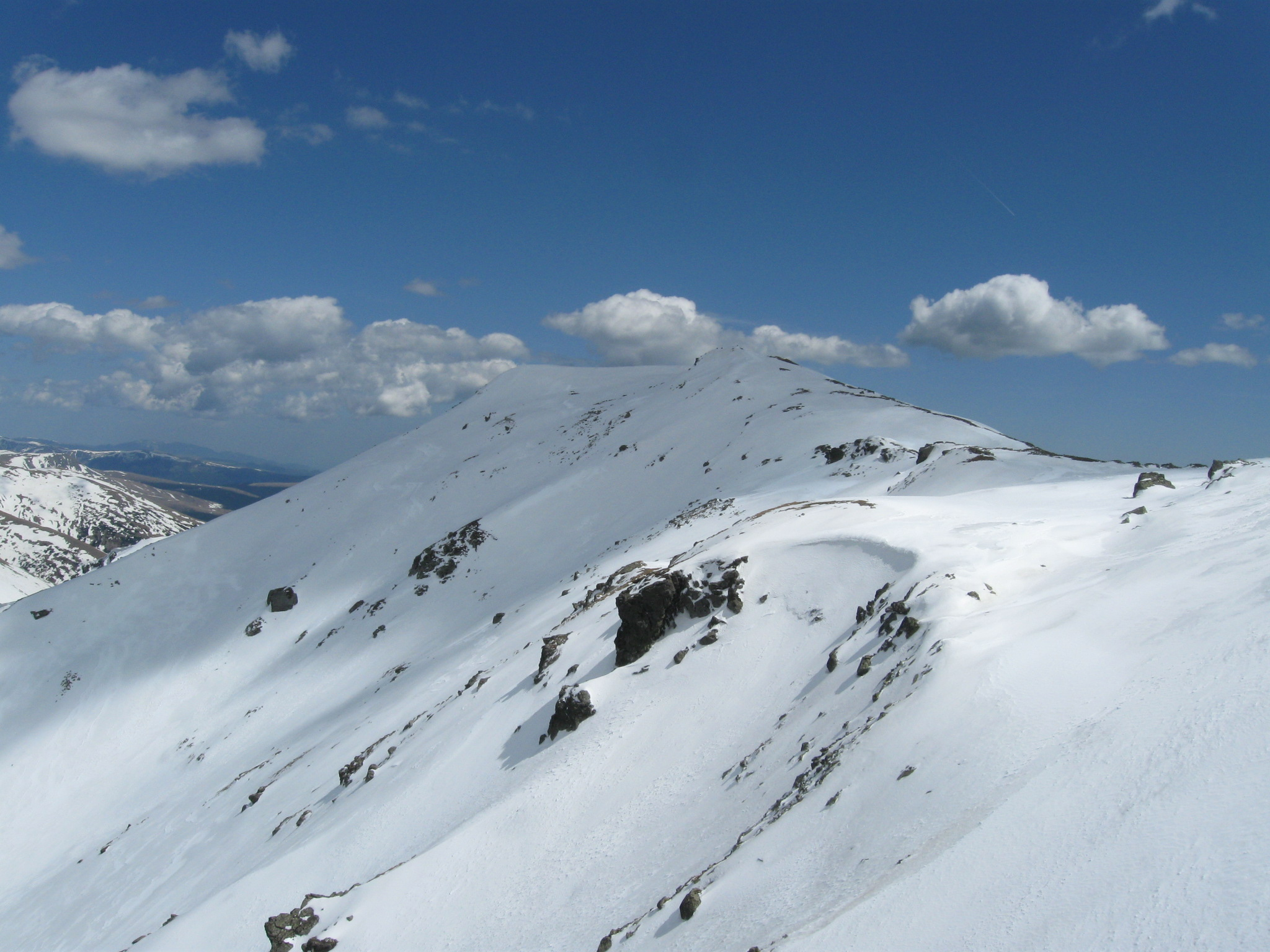
View of the Parâng mountains main ridge
