= Lotrioara =

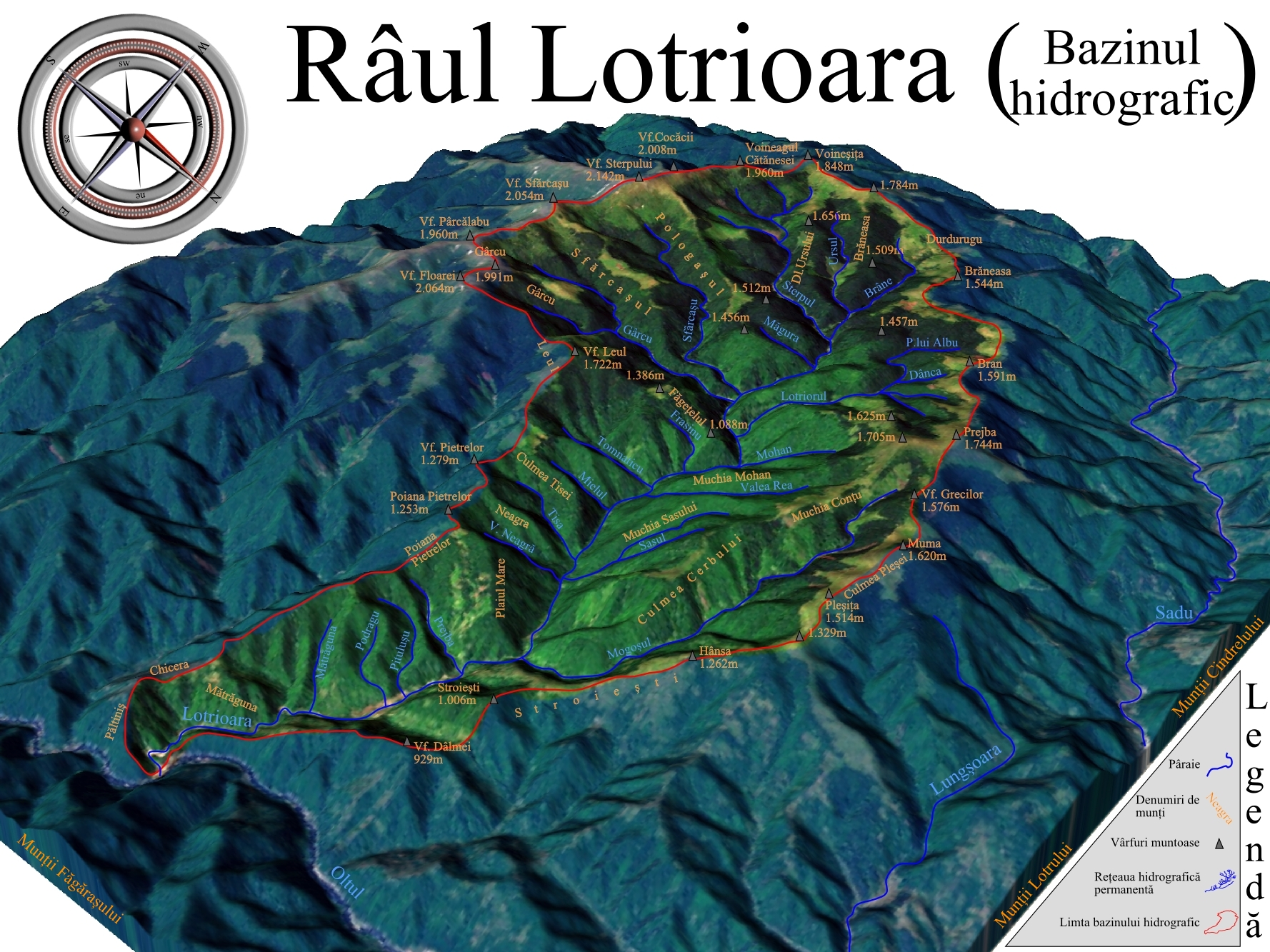
- Lotrioara drainage basin

- Location within Romania

Location
- Country: Romania
- Counties: Sibiu

Physical characteristics
- Source: Lotru Mountains
- Mouth: Olt
  - coordinates: 45.5619°N 24.2609°E
- Length: 25 km (16 mi)
- Basin size: 120 km^{2} (46 sq mi)

Basin features
- Progression: Olt→ Danube→ Black Sea

The Lotrioara (in its uppermost course also: Sterpu and Voinegel) is a right tributary of the river Olt in Romania. It originates in the Lotru Mountains. The Lotrioara discharges into the Olt in Lazaret. Its length is 25 km (16 mi) and its basin size is 120 km^{2} (46 sq mi).

== Tributaries ==
The following rivers are tributaries to the river Lotrioara (from source to mouth):

- Left: Brăneasa, Pârâul Cailor, Mohan, Valea Rea, Sasul, Mogoș
- Right: Voineag, Pârâul Afinelor, Pologașu, Sfârcaș, Gârcu, Frasinu, Izvorul Tomnatecului, Izvorul Mielului, Tisa, Valea Neagră, Prejba, Pitulușul, Podragul, Mătrăguna
