= Făgăraș Mountains group =

Subgroup of the Southern Carpathian mountains in central Romania

Făgăraș Mountains
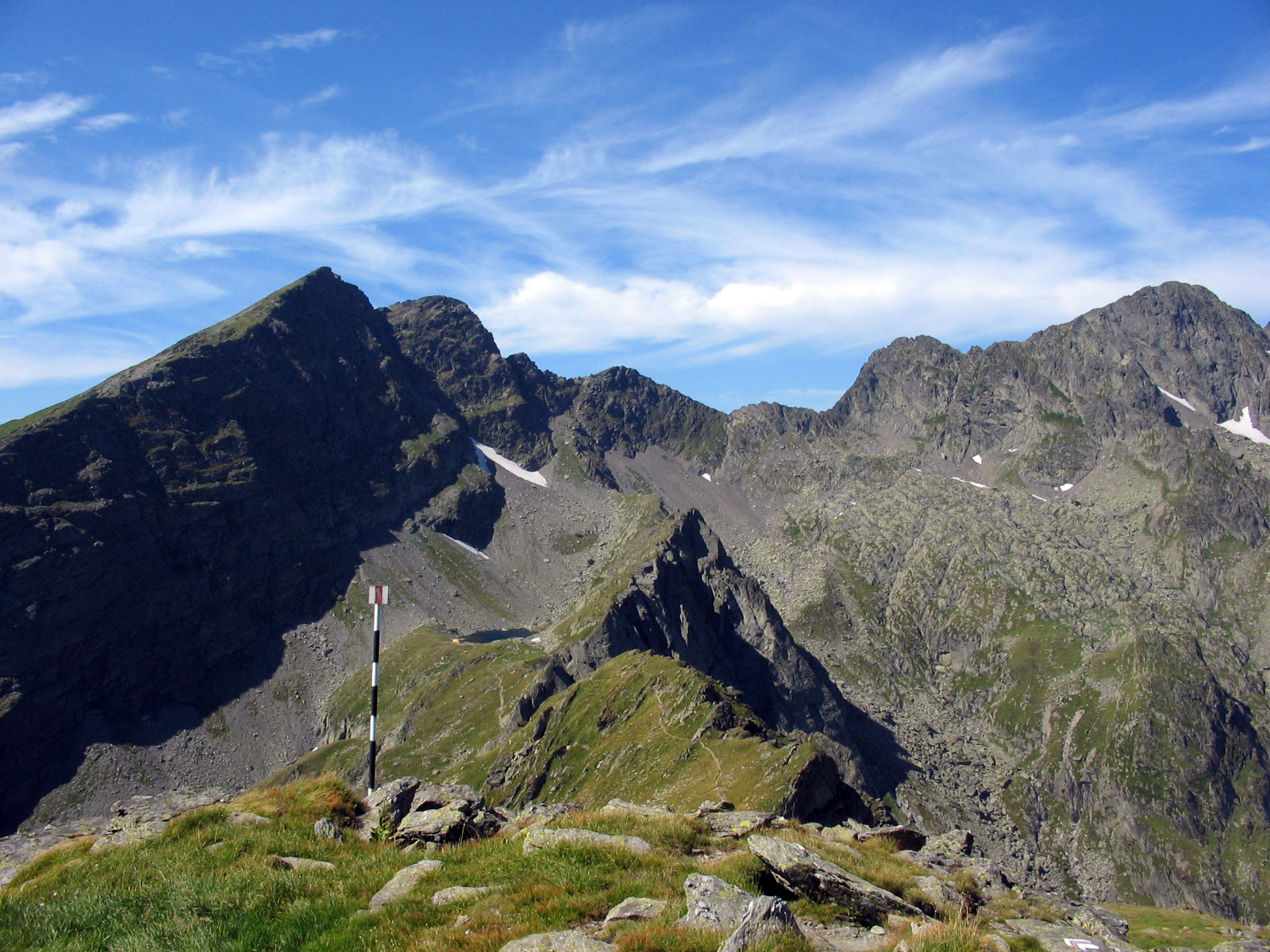
- Negoiu Peak (2535 m)

Highest point
- Peak: Moldoveanu
- Elevation: 2,544 m (8,346 ft)

Geography
- Country: Romania
- Borders on: Alps

The Făgăraș mountain group is a subgroup of mountains in the Southern Carpathians. It is named after the highest of the mountains in the group, the Făgăraș Mountains.

== Boundaries ==
The Făgăraș group is bounded:

- in the west, by the Olt River
- in the east, by the Rucăr-Bran Passage and the river Dâmbovița

== Mountains ==
- Făgăraș Mountains (Munții Făgărașului)
- Iezer Mountains (Munții Iezer; literally:Mountains of the Deep Lake)
- Cozia Mountains (Munții Cozia)

== See also ==
- Carpathian Mountains
- Parâng Mountains group
- Bucegi Mountains
