= Lotru Mountains =

- Romanian: Munții Lotrului
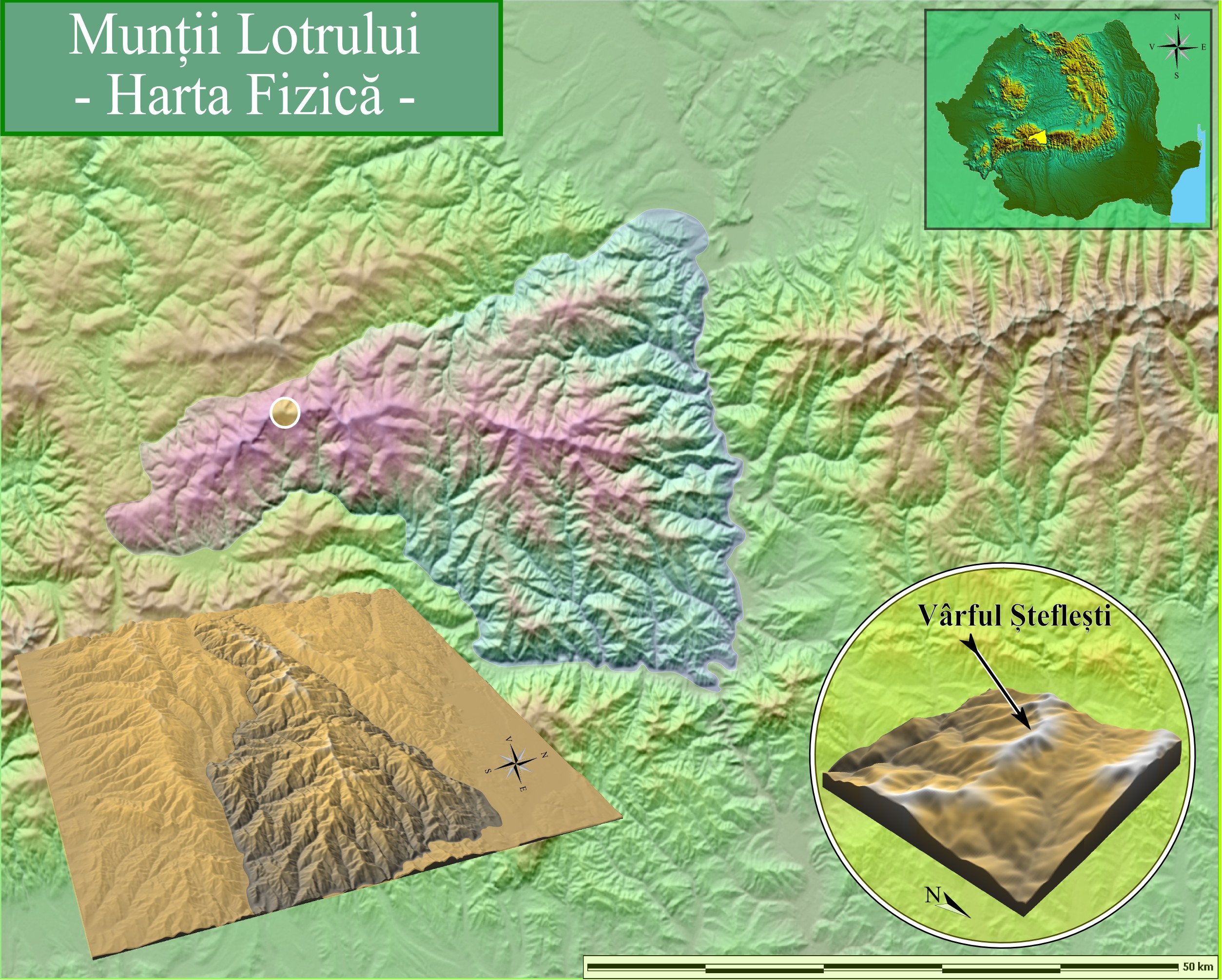
- Lotru Mountains (Physical Map)

Highest point
- Peak: Șteflești
- Elevation: 2,242 m (7,356 ft)
- Coordinates: 45°30′00″N 23°52′00″E

Geography
- Location within Romania
- Country: Romania
- Province: Vâlcea
- Parent range: Carpathians

Lotru Mountains (Romanian: Munții Lotrului) are a group of mountains that are part of the Southern Carpathians mountain range, in southern Romania. The highest peak is Șteflești Peak at 2,242 metres (7,356 ft).

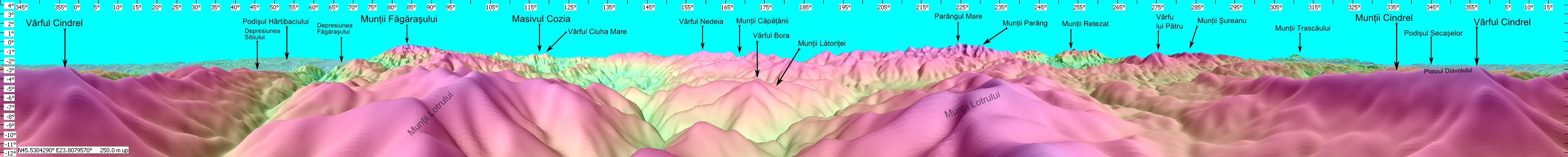
Panoramic view from Șteflești Peak
