= Amaradia (Dolj) =

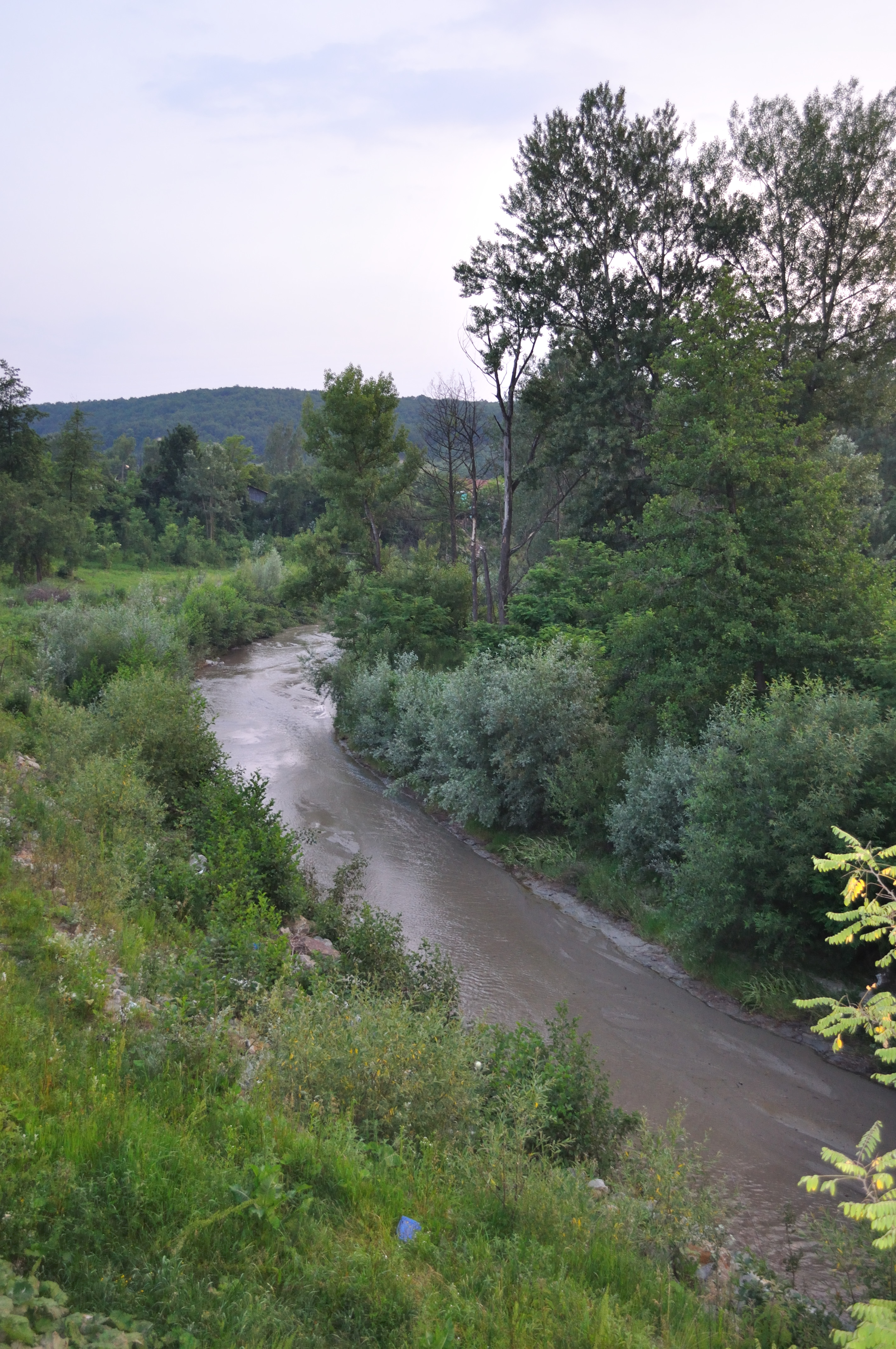
- The Amaradia near Târgu-Logrești

- Location of mouth in Romania

Location
- Country: Romania
- Counties: Gorj, Dolj
- Villages: Șimnicu de Sus

Physical characteristics
- Source: Parâng Mountains
  - location: near Roșia de Amaradia
- Mouth: Jiu
  - location: Ișalnița
  - coordinates: 44°21′44″N 23°42′41″E
- Length: 106 km (66 mi)
- Basin size: 879 km^{2} (339 sq mi)

Basin features
- Progression: Jiu→ Danube→ Black Sea

The Amaradia is a river in southern Romania. It is a left tributary of the river Jiu, and flows into the Jiu near the city Craiova. The Amaradia flows through the villages Roșia de Amaradia, Bustuchin, Logrești-Moșteni, Logrești, Hurezani, Crușeț, Melinești, Goiești, Șimnicu de Sus and Ișalnița. Its length is 106 km (66 mi) and its basin size is 879 km^{2} (339 sq mi).

== Tributaries ==
The following rivers are tributaries to the river Amaradia (from source to mouth):

Left: Strâmba, Seaca, Valea Hartanului, Amărăzuia, Slăvuța, Văluța, Plosca, Valea Șarpelui

Right: Poienița, Gâlcești, Negreni, Totea, Plopu, Găgâi, Valea Boului, Valea Muierii, Ploștina, Brebina
