= Seaca =

Seaca may refer to several places in Romania:

- Seaca, Olt, a commune in Olt County
- Seaca, Teleorman, a commune in Teleorman County
- Seaca, a village in Dofteana Commune, Bacău County
- Seaca, a village in Logrești Commune, Gorj County
- Seaca, a village in Poboru Commune, Olt County
- Seaca, a village in Sălătrucel Commune, Vâlcea County
- Seaca, a district in the town of Călimănești, Vâlcea County
- Seaca (Moldova), a tributary of the Moldova in Suceava County
- Seaca, a tributary of the Tărlung in Brașov County
