= Poienița =

Poienița may refer to several places in Romania:

- Poienița, a village in Arieșeni Commune, Alba County
- Poienița, a village in Vințu de Jos Commune, Alba County
- Poienița, a village in Bălilești Commune, Argeș County
- Poienița, a village in Poiana Commune, Dâmbovița County
- Poienița, a village in Bustuchin Commune, Gorj County
- Poienița, a village in Balșa Commune, Hunedoara County
- Poienița, a village in Livezeni Commune, Mureș County
- Poienița, a village in Băbeni Commune, Sălaj County
- Poienița, a village in Cârța Commune, Sibiu County
- Poienița, a village in Dumitrești Commune, Vrancea County
- Poienița Peak, Metaliferi Mountains, Alba County
- Poienița (river), a tributary of the Amaradia in Gorj County
