= Negreni (river) =

- Location within Romania

Location
- Country: Romania
- Counties: Gorj County
- Villages: Licurici, Negreni

Physical characteristics
- Mouth: Amaradia
  - coordinates: 44.8173°N 23.6557°E
- Length: 18 km (11 mi)
- Basin size: 38 km^{2} (15 sq mi)

Basin features
- Progression: Amaradia→ Jiu→ Danube→ Black Sea
- River code: VII.1.42.5

The Negreni is a right tributary of the river Amaradia in Romania. It flows into the Amaradia between the villages Negreni and Busuioci. Its length is 18 km (11 mi) and its basin size is 38 km^{2} (15 sq mi).
