= Uncești =

Unceşti may refer to:

- Unceşti, a village in Secuieni Commune, Neamţ County, Romania
- Unceşti, a village in Buneşti Commune, Suceava County, Romania
- Unceşti, a village in Zăpodeni Commune, Vaslui County, Romania
