= Slămnești =

Slămneşti may refer to:

- Slămneşti, a village in Brăduleț Commune, Argeș County, Romania
- Slămneşti, a village in Crușeț Commune, Gorj County, Romania
