= Gâlcești =

Gâlcești may refer to several places in Romania:

- Gâlcești, a village in Poiana Lacului Commune, Argeș County
- Gâlcești, a village in Berlești Commune, Gorj County
- Gâlcești (river), a tributary of the Amaradia in Gorj County
