= Podeni (disambiguation) =

Podeni may refer to several places in Romania:

- Podeni, a commune in Mehedinți County
- Podeni, a village in Buzoești Commune, Argeș County
- Podeni, a village in Corlăteni Commune, Botoșani County
- Podeni, a village in Moldovenești Commune, Cluj County
- Podeni, a village in Bunești Commune, Suceava County
- Podeni, a village in Vulturești Commune, Vaslui County
- Podeni, a village in Perișani Commune, Vâlcea County
- Podenii, a village in Urmeniș Commune, Bistrița-Năsăud County
- Podenii Noi, a commune in Prahova County
- Podenii Vechi, a village in Bălțești Commune, Prahova County
