= Totea gas field =

Natural gas field in Gorj County, Romania

Totea
- Country: Romania
- Region: Gorj County
- Offshore/onshore: onshore
- Operator: Petrom

Field history
- Discovery: 2011
- Start of development: 2011
- Start of production: 2012

Production
- Current production of gas: 480×10^{3} m^{3}/d 16.9×10^{6} cu ft/d 0.17×10^{9} m^{3}/a (6.0×10^{9} cu ft/a)
- Estimated gas in place: 10×10^{9} m^{3} 360×10^{9} cu ft

The Totea gas field is a natural gas field located in Licurici, Gorj County, Romania. When discovered in 2011, it was the largest gas deposit found in the country since 2005, with initial total proven reserves of around 360 billion ft^{3} (10 km^{3}). Petrom developed the field, beginning production of natural gas and condensates in 2012 at a rate of 16.9 million ft^{3}/day (0.48×10^{5} m^{3}).

== Pipe string drilling record ==
In 2013, a world record in pipe string drilling was set at the Totea gas field. The record was certified by Odfjell Well Services for the Totea 4545 borehole, which was drilled with the 20 inches (51 centimetres) core to a depth of 505 m (1,657 ft) in the Totea Deep field in Oltenia. This was the first phase of drilling well 4545, whose estimated total depth is 3,500 m (11,500 ft).

== Decline ==
Over several years, the Totea field was one of the most productive in Petrom's portfolio. But as with any oil and gas field, Totea went into decline after reaching its production plateau in 2017. Things changed in 2018, when a new well was dug, with a depth of 4,300 m (14,100 ft); investments in the new well and related infrastructure amounted to about €50 million. The well was successfully tested in April 2019, with an output of up to 0.5×10^{6} m^{3}/d (1.8×10^{7} cu ft/d). Natural gas from Totea is transported through 25 km (16 mi) of pipelines to the Hurezani hub to be treated and then delivered to the Romanian transmission system.

== 2023 earthquakes ==
In 2023, Gorj County was rocked by earthquakes for six consecutive days, representing the most intense seismic activity in the last 200 years in the region (see List of earthquakes in Romania). Some experts were amazed by the events, considering that the region was previously known as an earthquake-free area. A theory began to circulate among the locals that these earthquakes were caused by the deep well drilling (coupled perhaps with fracking) at the Totea gas field. These rumors have not been substantiated, with USR MP Radu-Dinel Miruță denying the use of fracking in the Totea–Hurezani region, and others declaring those rumors to be fake news.

== See also ==
- List of natural gas fields
- List of natural gas fields in Romania
- Natural gas in Romania
