= Plosca (river) =

- Location within Romania

Location
- Country: Romania
- Counties: Gorj, Dolj
- Villages: Dănciulești, Tălpaș, Fărcaș

Physical characteristics
- Mouth: Amaradia
  - coordinates: 44.5788°N 23.7119°E
- Length: 35 km (22 mi)
- Basin size: 96 km^{2} (37 sq mi)

Basin features
- Progression: Amaradia→ Jiu→ Danube→ Black Sea

The Plosca is a left tributary of the river Amaradia in Romania. It discharges into the Amaradia in Melinești. Its length is 35 km (22 mi) and its basin size is 96 km^{2} (37 sq mi).
