= Becheni =

Becheni may refer to several villages in Romania:

- Becheni, a village in Roșia de Amaradia Commune, Gorj County
- Becheni, a village in Săuca Commune, Satu Mare County
