= Brădetul River =

Brădetul River may refer to the following rivers in Romania:

- Brădetul, a tributary of the Râșnoava in Brașov County
- Brădet, a tributary of the Râul Mic in Alba County
- Brădetul, a tributary of the Teleajen in Prahova County

== See also ==
- Bradu River (disambiguation)
- Brădișor River
- Brădetu (disambiguation)
