= Dealu Viei =

Dealu Viei or Dealul Viei may refer to several villages in Romania:

- Dealul Viei, a village in Merei Commune, Buzău County
- Dealu Viei, a village in Roșia de Amaradia Commune, Gorj County
