= Soceni =

Soceni may refer to several villages in Romania:

- Soceni, a village in Ezeriș Commune, Caraș-Severin County
- Soceni, a village in Tălpaș Commune, Dolj County
