= Șimnicu =

Șimnicu may refer to one of two places in Dolj County, Romania:

- Șimnicu de Jos, a village in Craiova city
- Șimnicu de Sus, a commune
