= Măcrești =

Măcreşti may refer to several villages in Romania:

- Măcreşti, a village in Rebricea Commune, Vaslui County
- Măcreşti, a village in Zăpodeni Commune, Vaslui County
