= Bradu River =

Bradu River may refer to the following rivers in Romania:

- Brad, a tributary of the Baraolt in Covasna County
- Brad, a tributary of the Olt in Sibiu County
- Bradu, a tributary of the Priboiasa in Vâlcea County
- Brad, a tributary of the Răstolița in Mureș County

== See also ==
- Brad (disambiguation)
- Brădetul River (disambiguation)
- Brădișor River
- Bradu, the name of three villages in Romania
