= Plosca (disambiguation) =

Plosca may refer to the following places in Romania:

- Plosca, a commune in Teleorman County
- Plosca, a village in the commune Bistreț, Dolj County
- Plosca, a village in the commune Teliucu Inferior, Hunedoara County
- Plosca (river), a tributary of the Amaradia in Gorj and Dolj Counties
