= Ruget =

Ruget may refer to two villages in Romania:

- Ruget, a village in Roșia de Amaradia Commune, Gorj County
- Ruget, a village in Vidra Commune, Vrancea County
