= Slăvuța =

- Location within Romania

Location
- Country: Romania
- Counties: Gorj County
- Villages: Slăvuța

Physical characteristics
- Mouth: Amaradia
  - coordinates: 44.6602°N 23.6601°E
- Length: 17 km (11 mi)
- Basin size: 29 km^{2} (11 sq mi)

Basin features
- Progression: Amaradia→ Jiu→ Danube→ Black Sea
- River code: VII.1.42.8

The Slăvuța is a left tributary of the river Amaradia in Romania. It flows into the Amaradia near Mielușei. Its length is 17 km (11 mi) and its basin size is 29 km^{2} (11 sq mi).
