= Brădet =

Brădet may refer to several villages in Romania:

- Brădet, a village in Almașu Mare Commune, Alba County
- Brădet, a village in Brăduleț Commune, Argeș County
- Brădet, a village in Buntești Commune, Bihor County
- Brădet, a village in Întorsura Buzăului Town, Covasna County
- Brădet, a village in Mătăsari Commune, Gorj County
- Brădet, a village in Starchiojd Commune, Prahova County

== See also ==
- Brădetu (disambiguation)
- Brădești (disambiguation)
- Brădățel (disambiguation)
- Brădeanca (disambiguation)
