= Colțești =

Colţeşti may refer to several villages in Romania:

- Colţeşti, a village in Rimetea Commune, Alba County
- Colţeşti, a village in Logrești Commune, Gorj County
- Colţeşti, a village in Alunu Commune, Vâlcea County
