= Șitoaia =

Şitoaia may refer to several places in Romania:

- Şitoaia, a village in Almăj Commune, Dolj County
- Şitoaia, a village in Roșia de Amaradia Commune, Gorj County
