= Brădetu =

Brădetu may refer to several villages in Romania:

- Brădetu, a village in Brăduleț Commune, Argeș County
- Brădetu, a village in Nistorești Commune, Vrancea County

== See also ==
- Brădet (disambiguation)
- Brădești (disambiguation)
- Brădățel (disambiguation)
- Brădeanca (disambiguation)
- Brădetul River (disambiguation)
