= Amărăzuia =

- Location within Romania

Location
- Country: Romania
- Counties: Gorj County
- Villages: Stejari, Baloșani

Physical characteristics
- Mouth: Amaradia
  - coordinates: 44.7176°N 23.6367°E
- Length: 23 km (14 mi)
- Basin size: 70 km^{2} (27 sq mi)

Basin features
- Progression: Amaradia→ Jiu→ Danube→ Black Sea
- Tributaries
  - left: Horga
- River code: VII.1.42.7

The Amărăzuia is a left tributary of the river Amaradia in Romania. It flows into the Amaradia near Baloșani. Its length is 23 km (14 mi) and its basin size is 70 km^{2} (27 sq mi).
