= Văluța oil field =

Oil field in Gorj County, Romania

Văluța
- Country: Romania
- Region: Gorj County
- Offshore/onshore: onshore
- Operator: Expert Petroleum

Field history
- Discovery: 1980
- Start of development: 1980
- Start of production: 1981

Production
- Current production of oil: 1,500 barrels per day (~75,000 t/a)
- Estimated oil in place: 6.1 million tonnes (~ 7.2×10^{6} m^{3} or 45 million bbl)

The Văluța oil field is an oil field located in Crușeț, Gorj County, Romania. It was discovered in 1980 and developed by Petrom. Petrom abandoned the field in 1998 when it was bought by Expert Petroleum. It began production in 1981 and produces oil. The total proven reserves of the Văluța oil field are around 45 million barrels (6.1 million tonnes), and production is centered on 1,500 barrels per day (240 m^{3}/d).
