= Brădățel =

Brădățel may refer to several villages in Romania:

- Brădățel, a village in Pucheni Commune, Dâmbovița County
- Brădățel, a village in Burjuc Commune, Hunedoara County
- Brădățel, a village in Horodniceni Commune, Suceava County

== See also ==
- Brădet (disambiguation)
- Brădetu (disambiguation)
- Brădești (disambiguation)
- Brădeanca (disambiguation)
