= Bustuchin oil field =

Oil field in Romania

Bustuchin
- Country: Romania
- Region: Gorj County
- Offshore/onshore: onshore
- Operator: Petrom

Field history
- Discovery: 1967
- Start of development: 1967
- Start of production: 1968

Production
- Current production of oil: 800 barrels per day (~40,000 t/a)
- Estimated oil in place: 1.8 million tonnes (~ 2.1×10^{6} m^{3} or 13 million bbl)
- Estimated gas in place: 2×10^{9} m^{3} 70×10^{9} cu ft

The Bustuchin oil field is an oil field located in Bustuchin, Gorj County. It was discovered in 1967 and developed by Petrom. It began production in 1968 and produces oil and natural gas. As of 1995, the total proven reserves of the Bustuchin oil field were around 13 million barrels (1.8 million tonnes), and production was centered on 800 barrels per day (130 m^{3}/d).

According to data provided by the Romanian Agency for Mineral Resources, the Bustuchin field produced 804.752×10^{6} m^{3} (2.8×10^{10} cu ft) of gas in 2022, making it the largest in Romania in terms of natural gas production.
