= Dumitru Burlan =

Romanian former Securitate officer

- Born: May 11, 1939 (age 86); Licurici, Gorj County, Kingdom of Romania
- Occupation: Former Securitate officer

Dumitru Burlan (born May 11, 1939) is a Romanian former Securitate officer.

== Biography ==
Dumitru Burlan was born on May 11, 1939, in Licurici, Gorj County, in a family of poor peasants with seven children. In 1950, after graduating from primary school in his native village, his father brought him to Bucharest. In the capital, he was enrolled into the military school.

In August 1960, at the age of 21, he was ranked as junior lieutenant in the State Security Department. In the 1960s, his hierarchical bosses were Soviet advisers or close-knits, such as Gheorghe Pintilie, alias Pantiusha Bondarenko.

In 1965, when Nicolae Ceaușescu was elected head of the Romanian Communist Party, Dumitru Burlan worked in the 7th Directorate (Surveillance and Investigations) with the rank of lieutenant-major. In 1989, he had the lieutenant colonel rank, Specialist Officer I at the 5th SSD Directorate. He worked for 30 years in the Securitate, including 22 years in the 5th Directorate.

During the communist period, he worked for the Securitate. He was the chief of bodyguards of President Nicolae Ceaușescu, and served once as his stand-in (double), but was not able to protect Ceaușescu from arrest and execution during the Romanian Revolution of 1989. Ten years after the revolution, he published his understanding of the revolutionary events and his beliefs about Ceaușescu. After publishing details about the coup, he received several death threats. He declared himself proud of having served Ceaușescu, and he considers Ceaușescu to have been one of the most intelligent and greatest leaders in history.

Burlan published his memoirs in 2003.

== Bibliography ==
- A series of 3 articles in the Romanian newspaper Adevărul, 2003, (see archives) titled "I was Ceaușescu's double" ("Eu am fost sosia lui Nicolae Ceaușescu")
- Viorel Patrichi, "I was Nicolae Ceaușescu's double" (Eu am fost sosia lui Nicolae Ceaușescu), Lumea, Nr 12, 2001
- Marian Oprea, "15 years later – the Securitate conspiracy" ("Au trecut 15 ani—Conspirația Securității"), Lumea, Nr 10, 2004
- Victor Stănculescu, "Nu vă fie milă, au 2 miliarde de lei în cont" ("Do not have pity, they hold 2 billion lei [~65 million dollars at the exchange rate of November 22, 2004] in their account[s]"), in Jurnalul Național, November 22, 2004
