= Bustuchin Coal Mine =

Coal mine in Romania

Bustuchin Coal mine
- Location within Romania
- Location: Bustuchin, Gorj County, Romania; 44°58′0.01″N 23°43′59.99″E
- Products: Coal
- Company: CE Craiova

Bustuchin Coal Mine is an open-pit mining exploitation, one of the largest in Romania located in Bustuchin, Gorj County with estimated coal reserves of 17.7 million tonnes. The legal entity managing the Bustuchin mine is the CE Craiova which was set up in 2003.
