= Gâlcești (river) =

- Location within Romania

Location
- Country: Romania
- Counties: Gorj County
- Villages: Lihulești, Pârâu Viu, Berlești, Gâlcești

Physical characteristics
- Mouth: Amaradia
  - coordinates: 44.8403°N 23.6728°E
- Length: 19 km (12 mi)
- Basin size: 54 km^{2} (21 sq mi)

Basin features
- Progression: Amaradia→ Jiu→ Danube→ Black Sea
- River code: VII.1.42.4

The Gâlcești is a right tributary of the river Amaradia in Romania. It flows into the Amaradia near the village Gâlcești. Its length is 19 km (12 mi) and its basin size is 54 km^{2} (21 sq mi).
