= Brădești =

Brădești may refer to several places in Romania:

- Brădești, Dolj, a commune in Dolj County
- Brădești, Harghita, a commune in Harghita County
- Brădești, a village in Lupșa Commune, Alba County
- Brădești, a village in Râmeț Commune, Alba County
- Brădești, a village in Vinderei Commune, Vaslui County
- Brădești (Jiu), a river in Dolj County
- Brădești (Târnava Mare), a river in Harghita County

== See also ==
- Brădet (disambiguation)
- Brădetu (disambiguation)
- Brădățel (disambiguation)
- Brădeanca (disambiguation)
