= Poienița (river) =

- Location within Romania

Location
- Country: Romania
- Counties: Gorj County
- Villages: Poienița, Cionți

Physical characteristics
- Mouth: Amaradia
  - coordinates: 44.9424°N 23.6968°E
- Length: 10 km (6.2 mi)
- Basin size: 21 km^{2} (8.1 sq mi)

Basin features
- Progression: Amaradia→ Jiu→ Danube→ Black Sea
- River code: VII.1.42.1

The Poienița is a right tributary of the river Amaradia in Romania. It flows into the Amaradia in Pojaru. Its length is 10 km (6.2 mi) and its basin size is 21 km^{2} (8.1 sq mi).
