= Brădeanca =

Brădeanca may refer to several villages in Romania:

- Brădeanca, a village in Jirlău Commune, Brăila County
- Brădeanca, a village in Vernești Commune, Buzău County

== See also ==
- Brădet (disambiguation)
- Brădetu (disambiguation)
- Brădești (disambiguation)
- Brădățel (disambiguation)
