= Fărcaș =

- Commune
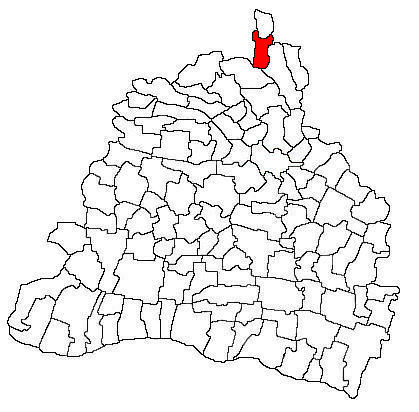
- Location in Dolj County

- Location in Romania
- Coordinates: 44°40′N 23°44′E
- Country: Romania
- County: Dolj
- Area: 47.05 km^{2} (18.17 sq mi)
- Population (2021-12-01): 2,047
  - Density: 43.51/km^{2} (112.7/sq mi)
- Time zone: UTC+02:00 (EET)
  - Summer (DST): UTC+03:00 (EEST)
- Vehicle reg.: DJ

Fărcaș is a commune in Dolj County, Oltenia, Romania with a population of 3,590 people. It is composed of five villages: Amărăști, Fărcaș, Golumbelu, Golumbu and Plopu-Amărăști. It included five other villages until 2004, when they were split off to form Tălpaș Commune.
