= Ișalnița =

- Commune
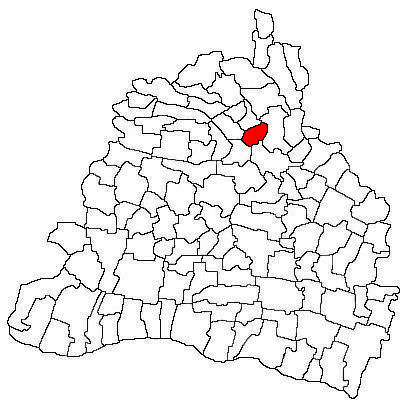
- Location in Dolj County

- Location in Romania
- Coordinates: 44°24′N 23°44′E
- Country: Romania
- County: Dolj
- Area: 19.87 km^{2} (7.67 sq mi)
- Population (2021-12-01): 4,042
  - Density: 203.4/km^{2} (526.9/sq mi)
- Time zone: UTC+02:00 (EET)
  - Summer (DST): UTC+03:00 (EEST)
- Vehicle reg.: DJ

Ișalnița is a commune in Dolj County, Oltenia, Romania with a population of 4,042 people. It is composed of a single village, Ișalnița.
