= Seaca, Olt =

Seaca
- Commune
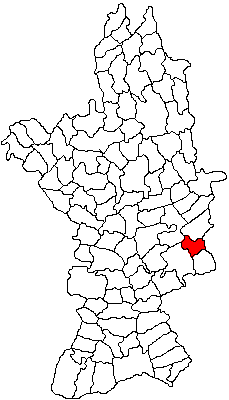
- Location in Olt County

- Location in Romania
- Coordinates: 44°10′N 24°45′E
- Country: Romania
- County: Olt
- Population (2021-12-01): 1,554
- Time zone: EET/EEST (UTC+2/+3)
- Vehicle reg.: OT

Seaca is a commune in Olt County, Muntenia, Romania. It is composed of a single village, Seaca.
