= Sălătrucel (river) =

Sălătrucel Coisca
- Location within Romania

Location
- Country: Romania
- Counties: Vâlcea County
- Villages: Pătești, Sălătrucel, Jiblea Veche

Physical characteristics
- Mouth: Olt
  - location: Jiblea Veche
  - coordinates: 45.2330°N 24.3459°E
- Length: 15 km (9.3 mi)
- Basin size: 99 km^{2} (38 sq mi)

Basin features
- Progression: Olt→ Danube→ Black Sea
- Tributaries
  - left: Valea Săcuienilor, Cornet
  - right: Brădișor, Sălătruc

The Sălătrucel (also: Coisca) is a left tributary of the river Olt in Romania. It discharges into the Olt in Jiblea Veche. The 15 km (9.3 mi) long Sălătrucel has a 99 km^{2} (38 sq mi) basin.
