= Bălțești =

- Commune
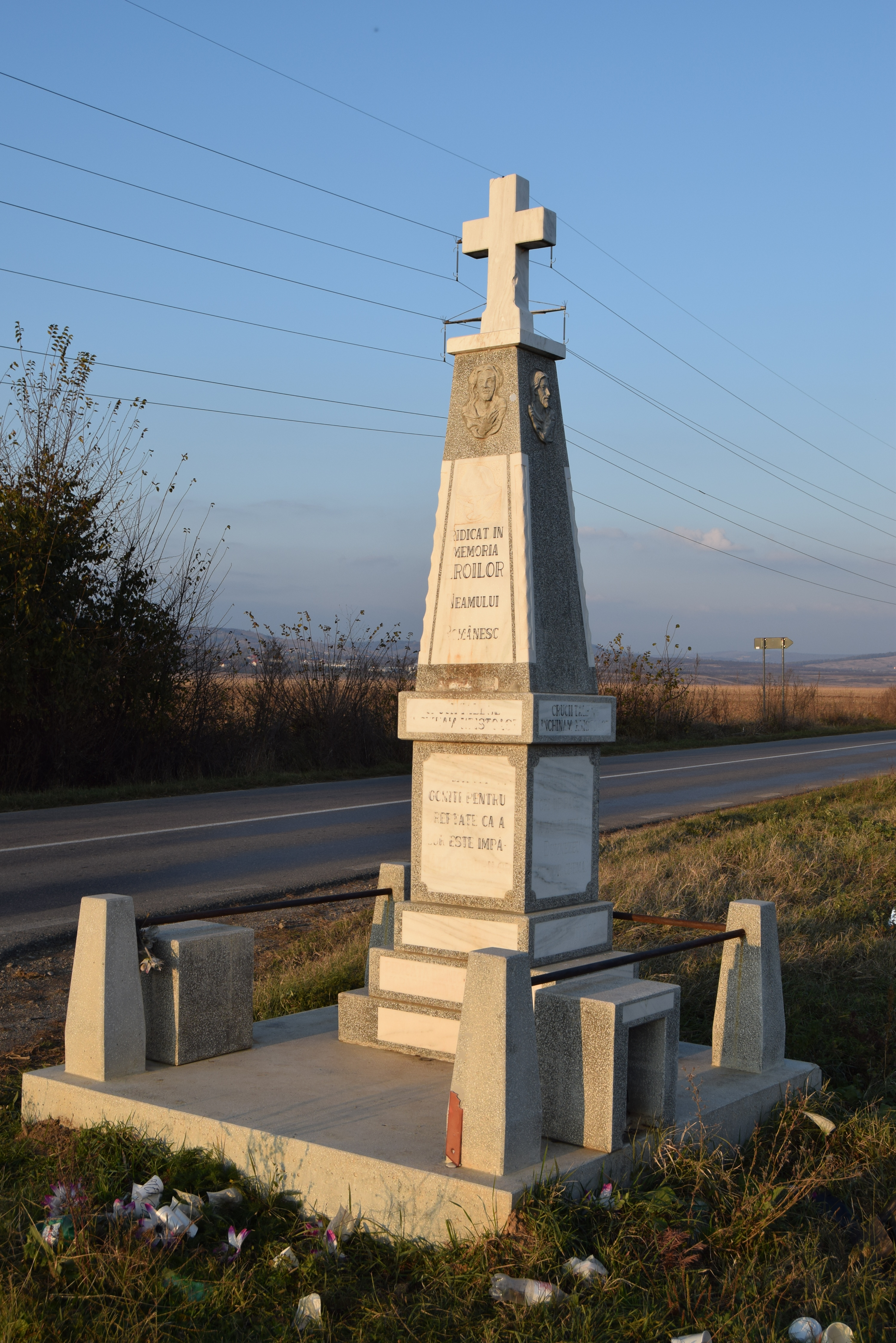
- Heroes' monument in Bălțești

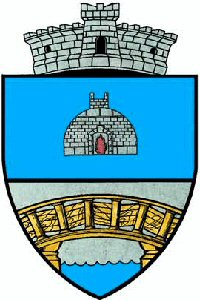
- Coat of arms

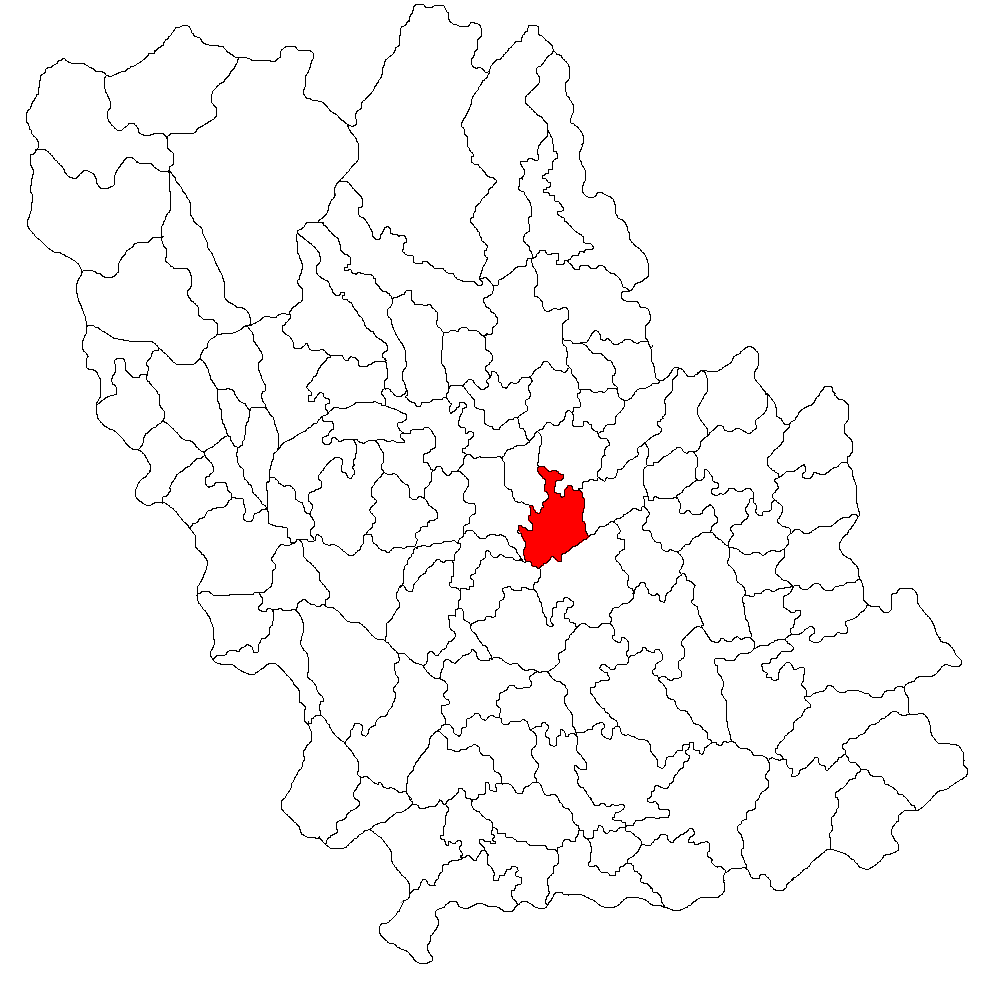
- Location in Prahova County

- Location in Romania
- Country: Romania
- County: Prahova

Government
  - Mayor (2024–2028): Ion Radu (PNL)
- Area: 36.66 km^{2} (14.15 sq mi)
- Elevation: 219 m (719 ft)
- Population (2021-12-01): 3,350
  - Density: 91.4/km^{2} (237/sq mi)
- Time zone: UTC+02:00 (EET)
  - Summer (DST): UTC+03:00 (EEST)
- Postal code: 107045
- Area code: +(40) 244
- Vehicle reg.: PH
- Website: primariabaltesti.ro

Bălțești is a commune in Prahova County, Muntenia, Romania. It is composed of three villages: Bălțești, Izești, and Podenii Vechi.

The commune is located in the central part of Prahova County, 26 km (16 mi) northeast of the county seat, Ploiești.

Historical population
Year	Pop.	±%
1992	3,598	—
2002	3,603	+0.1%
2011	3,434	−4.7%
2021	3,350	−2.4%
Source: Census data
