= Stejari =

- Commune
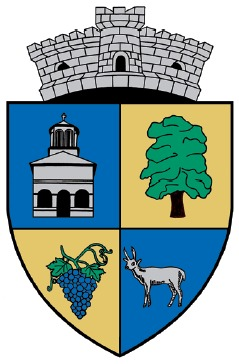
- Coat of arms

- Location in Romania
- Coordinates: 44°46′N 23°41′E
- Country: Romania
- County: Gorj
- Subdivisions: Baloșani, Băcești, Dealu Leului, Piscoiu, Popești-Stejari, Stejari
- Area: 74.55 km^{2} (28.78 sq mi)
- Population (2021-12-01): 2,205
  - Density: 29.58/km^{2} (76.61/sq mi)
- Time zone: UTC+02:00 (EET)
  - Summer (DST): UTC+03:00 (EEST)
- Vehicle reg.: GJ

Stejari is a commune in Gorj County, Oltenia, Romania. It is composed of six villages: Baloșani, Băcești, Dealu Leului, Piscoiu, Popești-Stejari and Stejari.
