= Melinești =

- Commune
- Location in Romania
- Coordinates: 44°34′N 23°43′E
- Country: Romania
- County: Dolj
- Area: 89.42 km^{2} (34.53 sq mi)
- Population (2021-12-01): 3,390
  - Density: 37.9/km^{2} (98.2/sq mi)
- Time zone: UTC+02:00 (EET)
  - Summer (DST): UTC+03:00 (EEST)
- Vehicle reg.: DJ

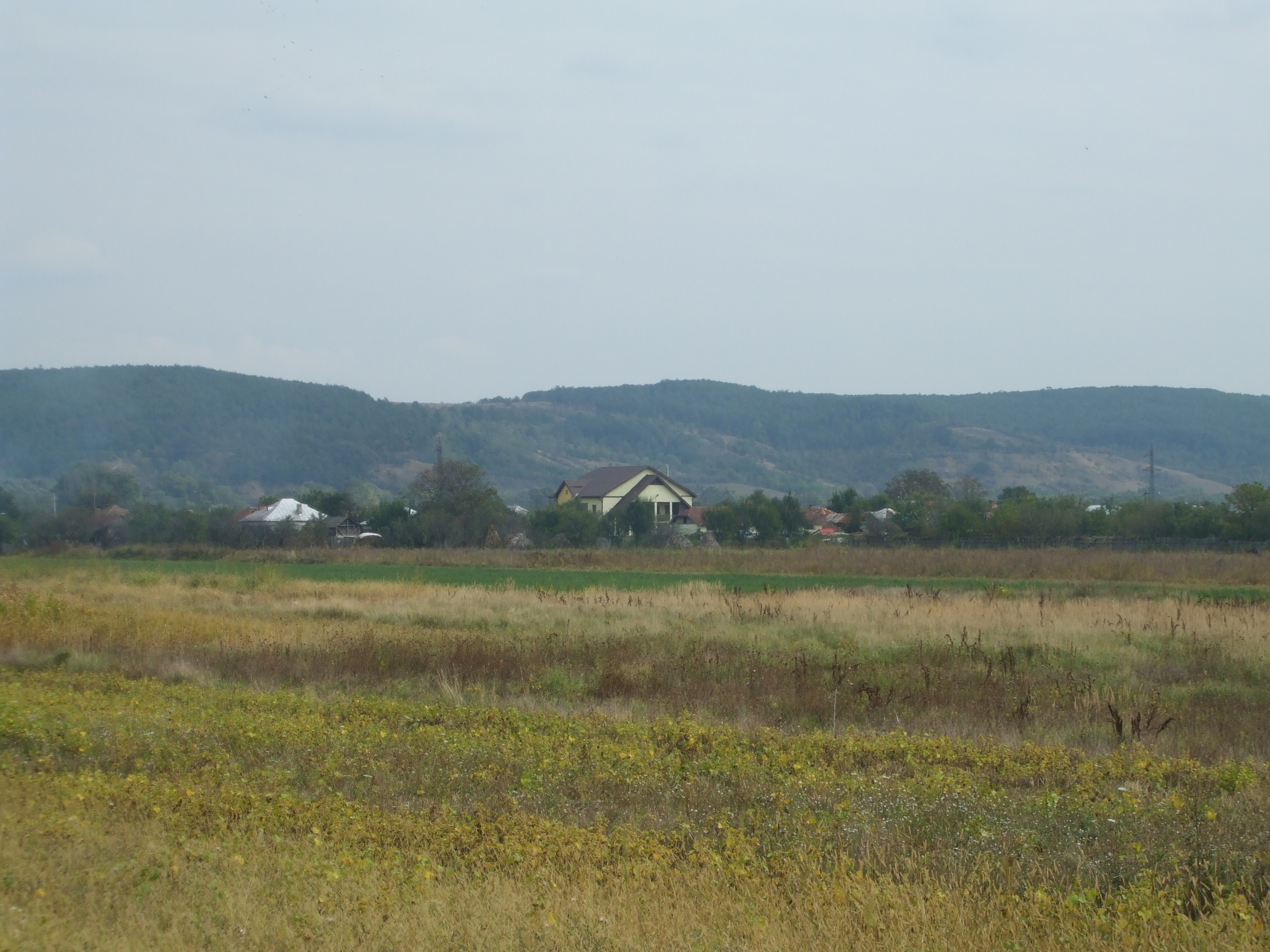

Melinești is a commune in Dolj County, Oltenia, Romania with a population of 4,392 people. It is composed of thirteen villages: Bodăiești, Bodăieștii de Sus, Godeni, Melinești, Muierușu, Negoiești, Odoleni, Ohaba, Ploștina, Popești, Spineni, Valea Mare and Valea Muierii de Jos.
