= Tălpaș =

- Commune
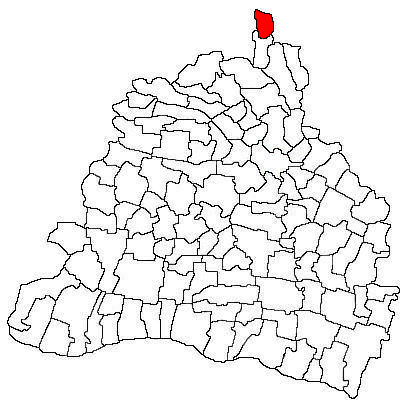
- Location in Dolj County

- Location in Romania
- Coordinates: 44°40′N 23°44′E
- Country: Romania
- County: Dolj
- Area: 30.38 km^{2} (11.73 sq mi)
- Population (2021-12-01): 1,049
  - Density: 34.53/km^{2} (89.43/sq mi)
- Time zone: UTC+02:00 (EET)
  - Summer (DST): UTC+03:00 (EEST)
- Vehicle reg.: DJ

Tălpaș is a commune in Dolj County, Oltenia, Romania with a population of 1,512 people. It is composed of five villages: Moflești, Nistoi, Puținei, Soceni and Tălpaș. These were part of Fărcaș Commune until 2004, when they were split off.
