= Bunești, Suceava =

Bunești
- Commune
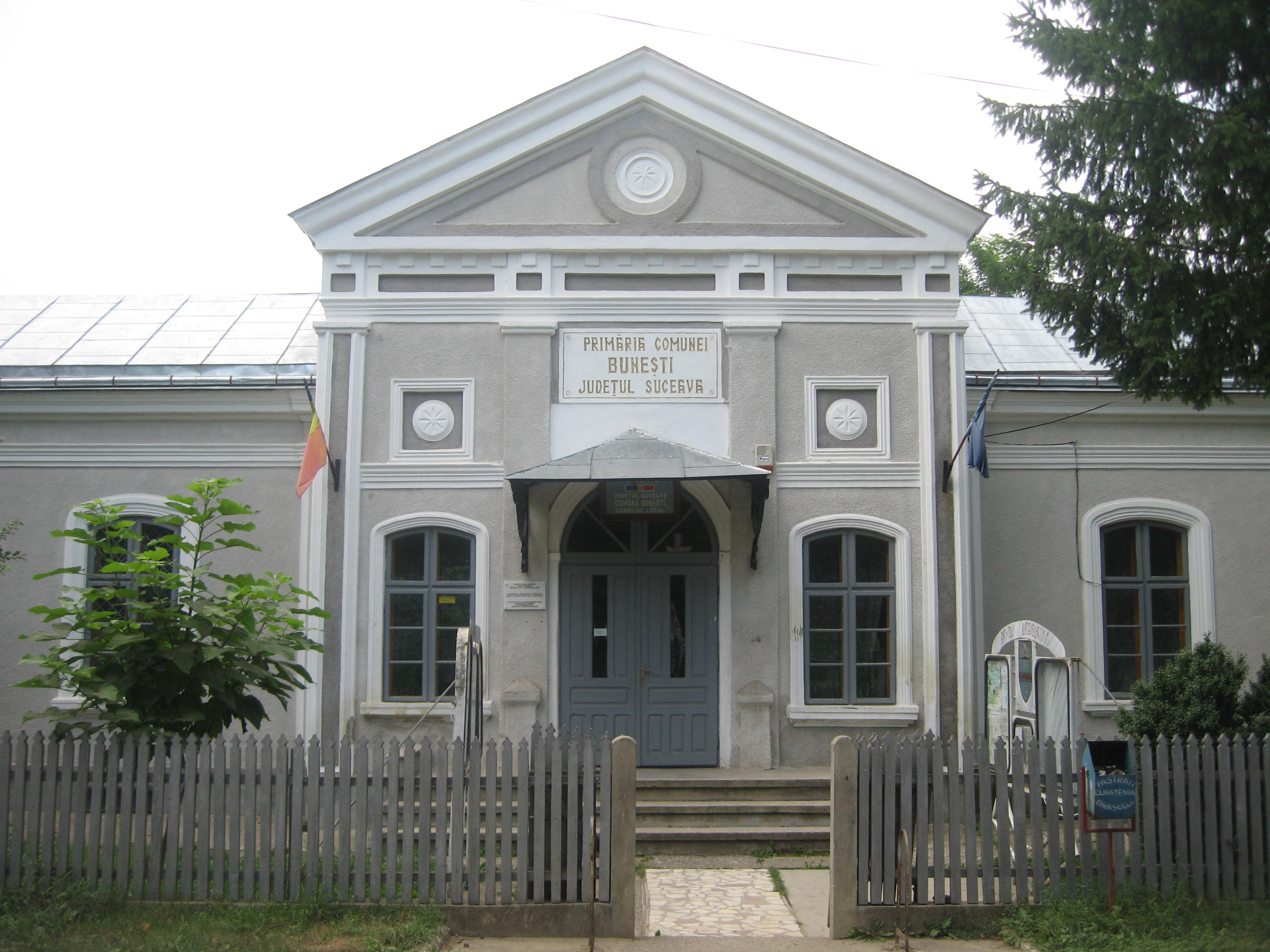

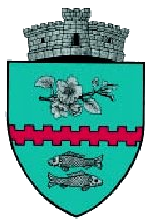
- Coat of arms

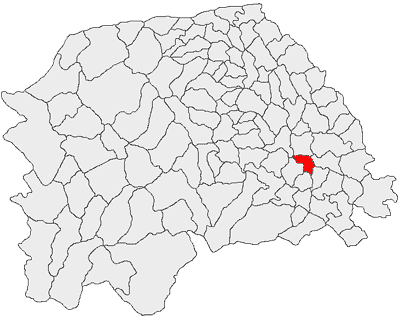
- Location in Suceava County

- Location in Romania
- Coordinates: 47°31′N 26°19′E
- Country: Romania
- County: Suceava
- Subdivisions: Bunești, Petia, Podeni, Șes, Uncești

Government
  - Mayor (2024–2028): Ioan Ștefan (PSD)
- Area: 28 km^{2} (11 sq mi)
- Elevation: 375 m (1,230 ft)
- Population (2021-12-01): 2,759
  - Density: 99/km^{2} (260/sq mi)
- Time zone: UTC+02:00 (EET)
  - Summer (DST): UTC+03:00 (EEST)
- Postal code: 727090
- Area code: +40 x30
- Vehicle reg.: SV
- Website: comunabunesti.ro

Bunești (German: Bunestie) is a commune located in Suceava County, Bukovina, northeastern Romania. It is composed of five villages: namely Bunești, Petia, Podeni, Șes, and Uncești.
