= Licurici =

- Commune
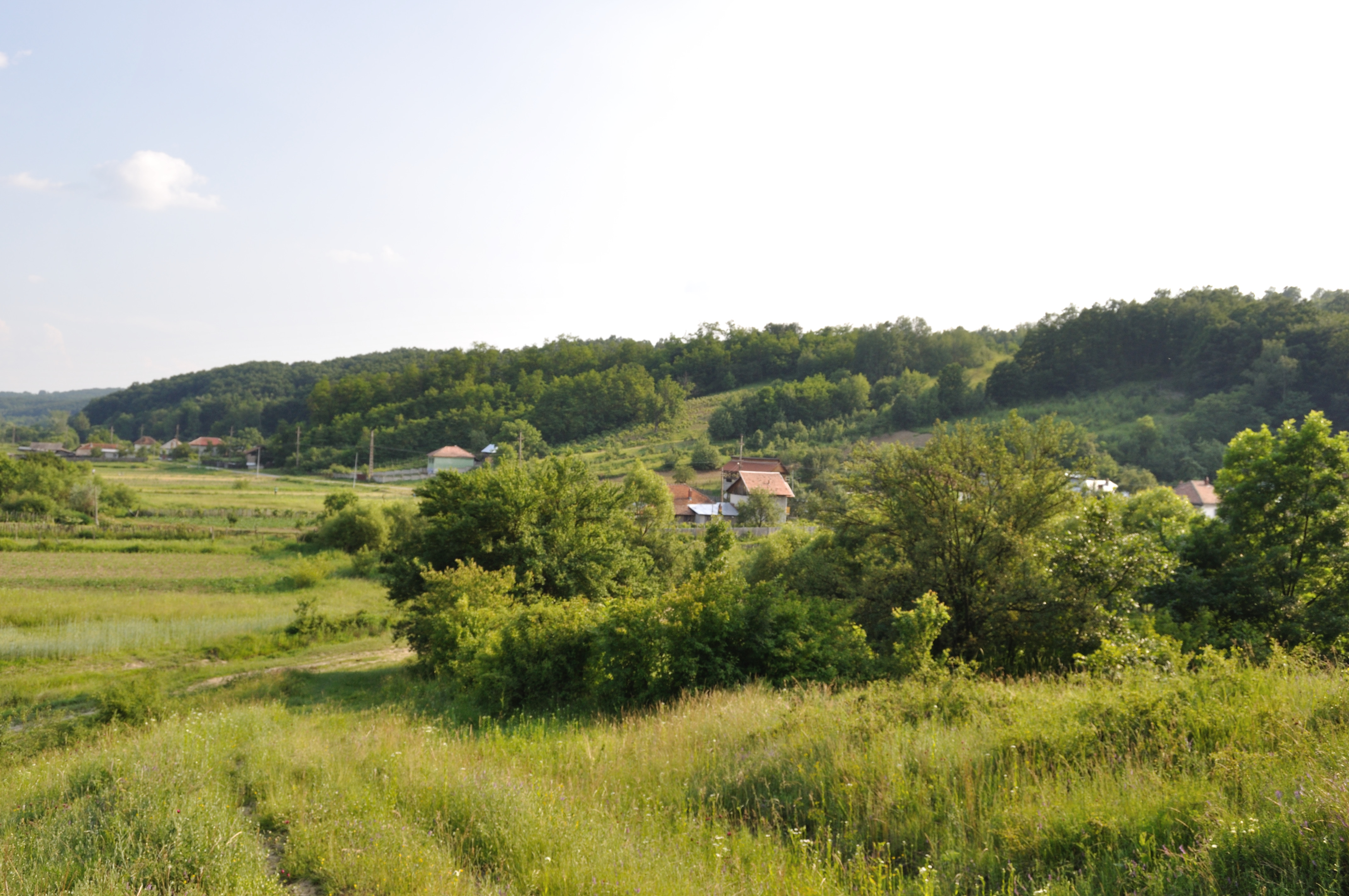
- Licuriciu de Sus, Gorj County

- Location in Romania
- Coordinates: 44°55′N 23°37′E
- Country: Romania
- County: Gorj
- Subdivisions: Frumușei, Licurici, Negreni, Totea
- Area: 61.65 km^{2} (23.80 sq mi)
- Population (2021-12-01): 1,976
  - Density: 32.05/km^{2} (83.01/sq mi)
- Time zone: UTC+02:00 (EET)
  - Summer (DST): UTC+03:00 (EEST)
- Vehicle reg.: GJ

Licurici is a commune in Gorj County, Oltenia, Romania. It is composed of four villages: Frumușei, Licurici, Negreni and Totea.

== Natives ==
- Dumitru Burlan
