= Sălătrucel =

- Commune
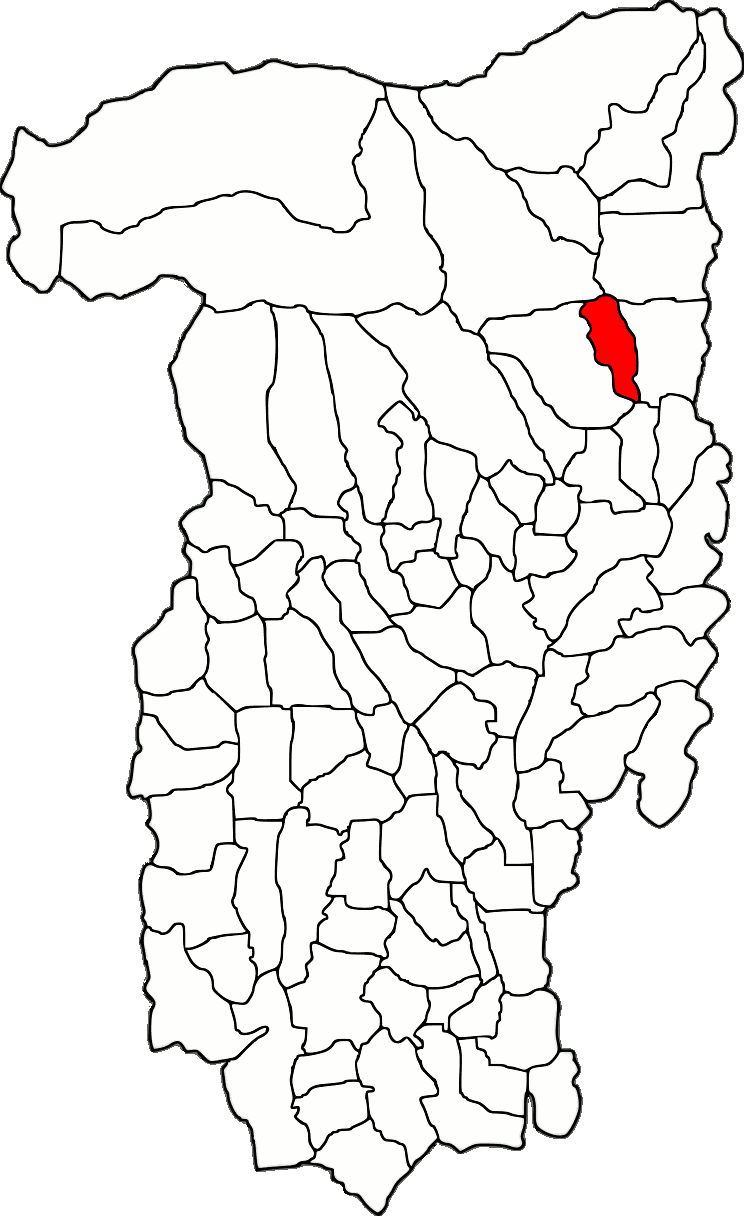
- Location in Vâlcea County

- Location in Romania
- Coordinates: 45°15′N 24°23′E
- Country: Romania
- County: Vâlcea
- Population (2021-12-01): 1,932
- Time zone: EET/EEST (UTC+2/+3)
- Vehicle reg.: VL

Sălătrucel is a commune located in Vâlcea County, Muntenia, Romania. It is composed of four villages: Pătești, Sălătrucel, Seaca and Șerbănești.
