= Berlești =

- Commune
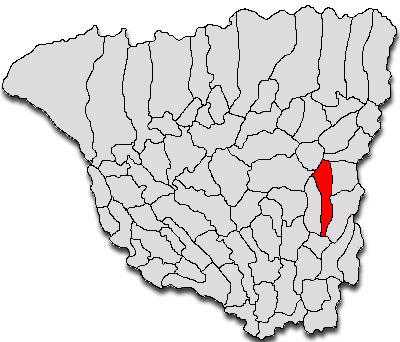
- Location in Gorj County

- Location in Romania
- Coordinates: 44°55′N 23°40′E
- Country: Romania
- County: Gorj
- Subdivisions: Bârzeiu, Berlești, Gâlcești, Lihulești, Pârâu Viu, Scrada, Scurtu

Government
  - Mayor (2020–2024): Iulian Berlescu (PNL)
- Population (2021-12-01): 1,869
- Time zone: EET/EEST (UTC+2/+3)
- Vehicle reg.: GJ

Berlești is a commune in Gorj County, Oltenia, Romania. It is composed of seven villages: Bârzeiu, Berlești, Gâlcești, Lihulești, Pârâu Viu, Scrada and Scurtu.
