= Șimnicu de Sus =

- Commune
- Location in Romania
- Coordinates: 44°23′N 23°48′E
- Country: Romania
- County: Dolj

Government
  - Mayor (2024–2028): Laurențiu Ifrim (PSD)
- Area: 65 km^{2} (25 sq mi)
- Elevation: 156 m (512 ft)
- Population (2021-12-01): 5,733
  - Density: 88/km^{2} (230/sq mi)
- Time zone: UTC+02:00 (EET)
  - Summer (DST): UTC+03:00 (EEST)
- Postal code: 207550
- Area code: +(40) 251
- Vehicle reg.: DJ
- Website: www.primariasimnicudesus.ro

Șimnicu de Sus is a commune in Dolj County, Oltenia, Romania with a population of 5,733 people as of 2021. It is composed of twelve villages: Albești, Cornetu, Deleni, Dudovicești, Duțulești, Florești, Izvor, Jieni, Leșile, Milești, Românești, and Șimnicu de Sus.
