= Zăpodeni =

- Commune
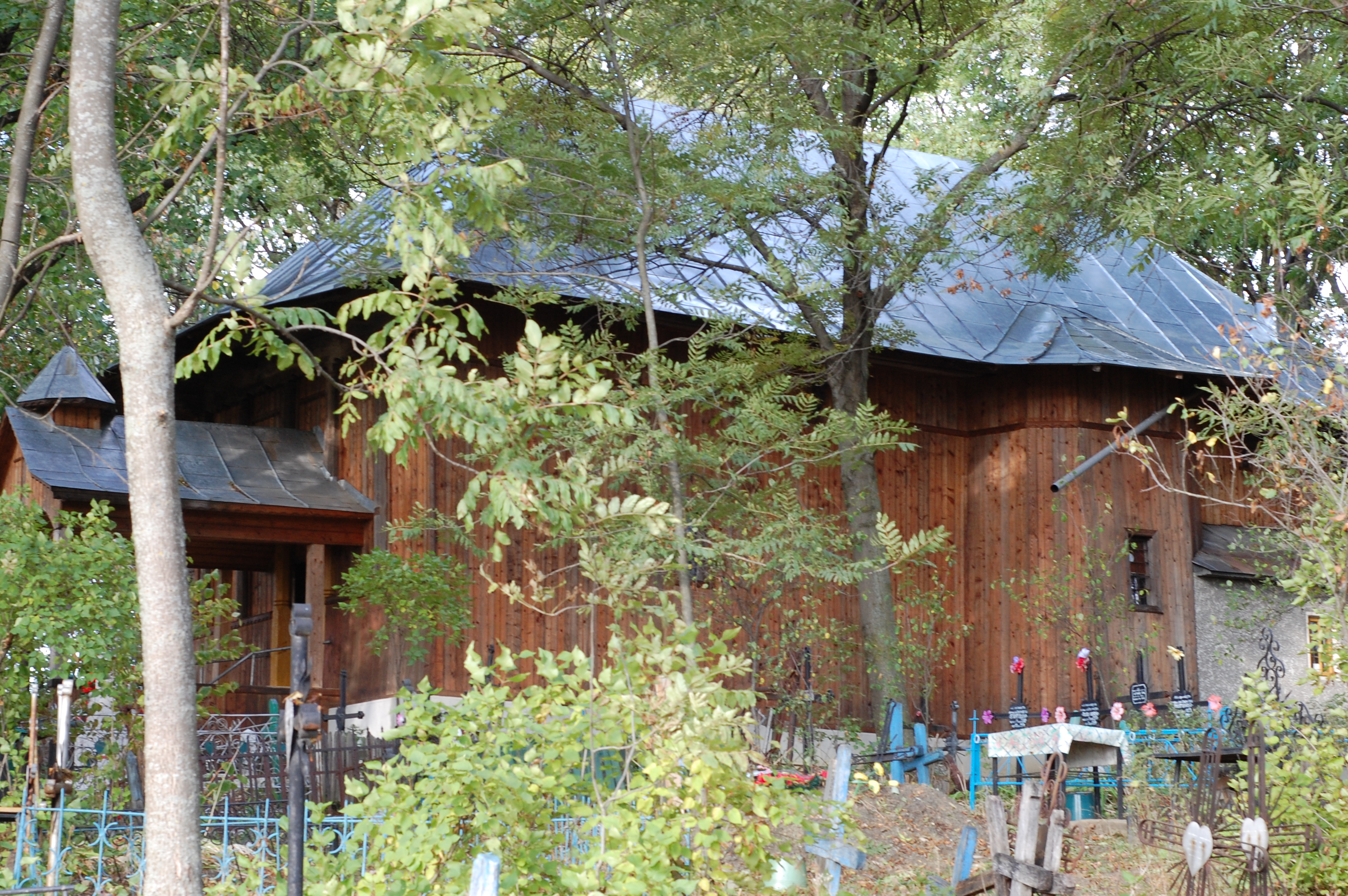
- Wooden church in Zăpodeni village

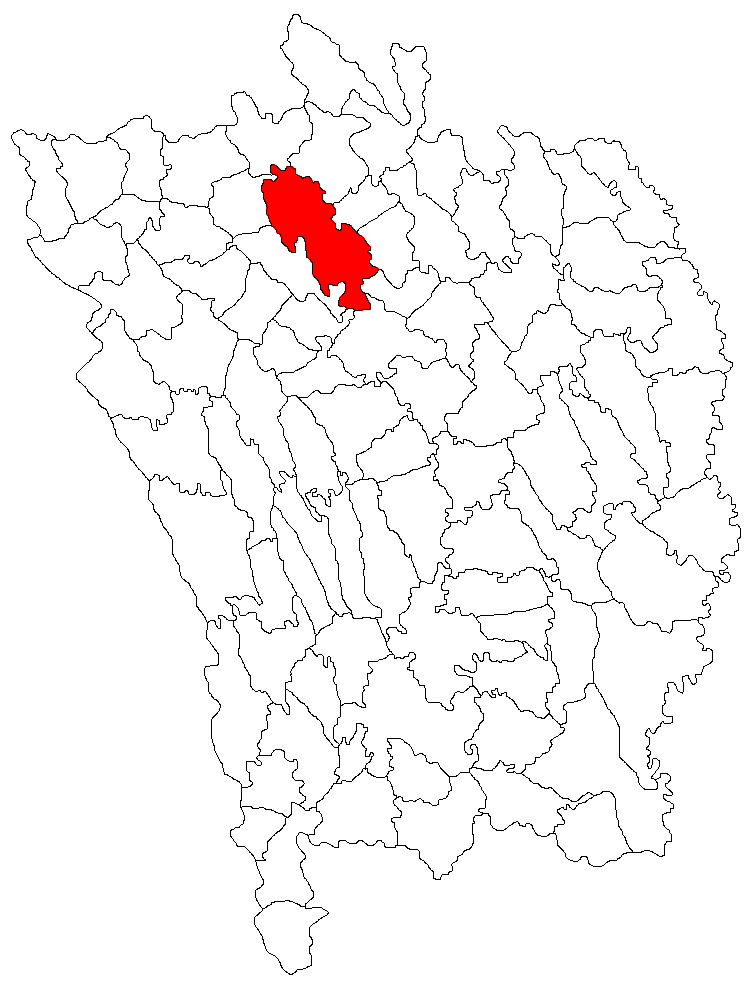
- Location in Vaslui County

- Location in Romania
- Coordinates: 46°45′N 27°39′E
- Country: Romania
- County: Vaslui
- Subdivisions: Butucăria, Ciofeni, Delea Dobroslovești, Măcrești, Portari, Telejna, Uncești, Zăpodeni

Government
  - Mayor (2020–2024): Ionel Chiratcu (PSD)
- Area: 101.16 km^{2} (39.06 sq mi)
- Elevation: 238 m (781 ft)
- Population (2021-12-01): 3,743
  - Density: 37.00/km^{2} (95.83/sq mi)
- Time zone: UTC+02:00 (EET)
  - Summer (DST): UTC+03:00 (EEST)
- Postal code: 737625
- Area code: +40 x35
- Vehicle reg.: VS
- Website: www.primariazapodeni.ro

Zăpodeni is a commune in Vaslui County, Western Moldavia, Romania. It is composed of nine villages: Butucăria, Ciofeni, Delea, Dobroslovești, Măcrești, Portari, Telejna, Uncești, and Zăpodeni.

== Natives ==
- Ion Bîrlădeanu (1946–2021), collage artist
