= Bustuchin =

- Commune
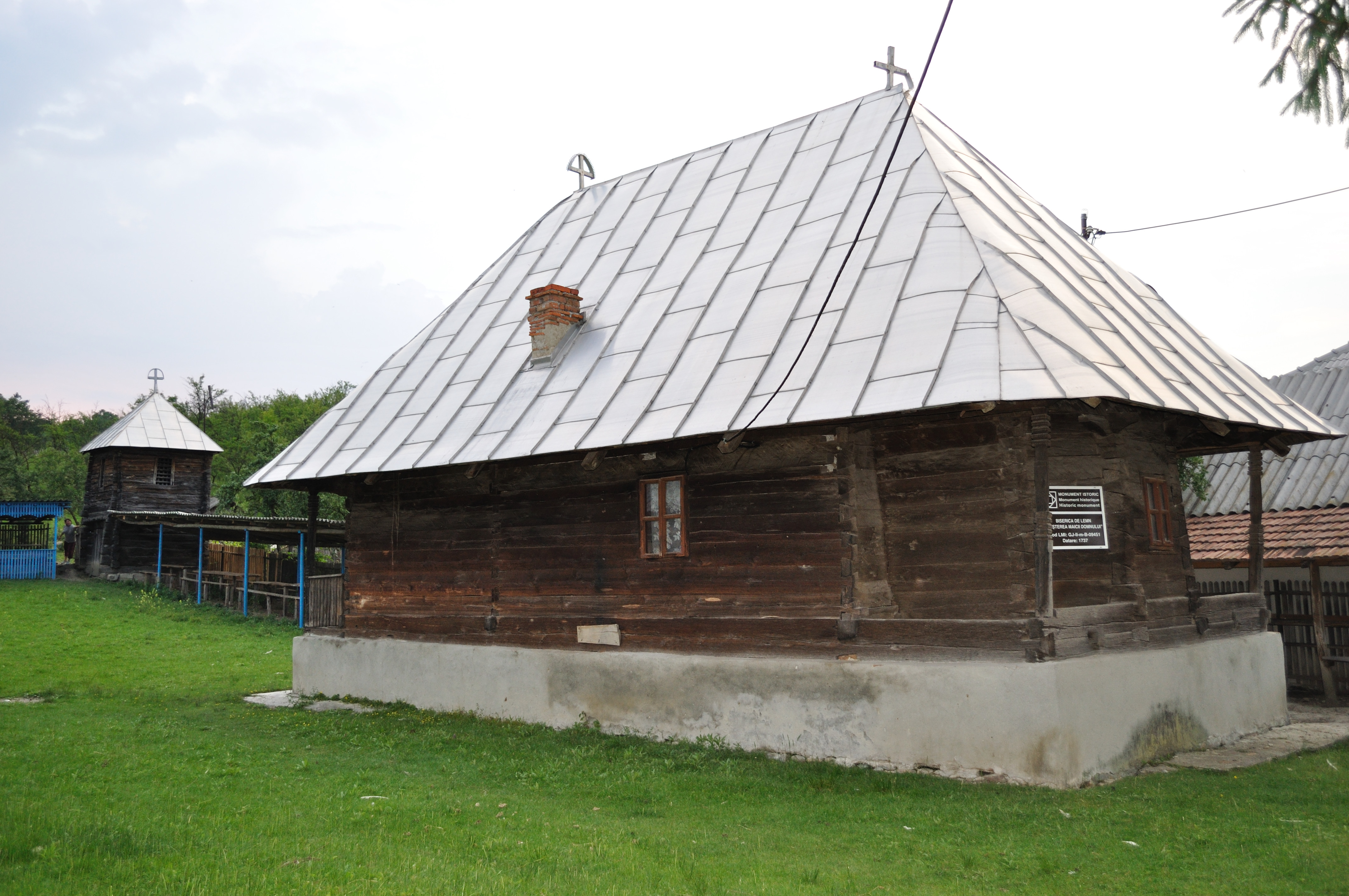
- Wooden church in Valea Pojarului

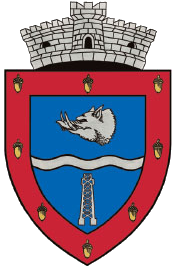
- Coat of arms

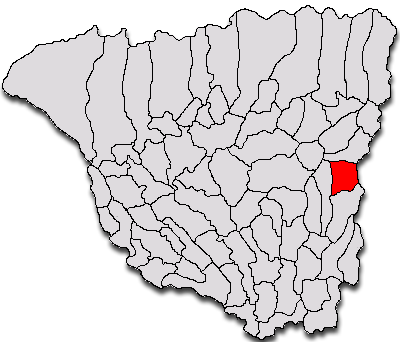
- Location in Gorj County

- Location in Romania
- Coordinates: 44°58′N 23°44′E
- Country: Romania
- County: Gorj
- Subdivisions: Bustuchin, Cionți, Motorgi, Nămete, Poiana-Seciuri, Poienița, Pojaru, Valea Pojarului

Government
  - Mayor (2020–2024): Ion Ciocea (PRO)
- Area: 60.95 km^{2} (23.53 sq mi)
- Elevation: 317 m (1,040 ft)
- Population (2021-12-01): 3,050
  - Density: 50.0/km^{2} (130/sq mi)
- Time zone: UTC+02:00 (EET)
  - Summer (DST): UTC+03:00 (EEST)
- Postal code: 217115
- Area code: +40 x53
- Vehicle reg.: GJ
- Website: primaria-bustuchin.ro

Bustuchin is a commune in Gorj County, Oltenia, Romania. It is composed of eight villages: Bustuchin, Cionți, Motorgi, Nămete, Poiana-Seciuri, Poienița, Pojaru, and Valea Pojarului.

The Bustuchin Coal Mine and the Bustuchin oil field are located on the territory of the commune.
