= Logrești =

- Commune
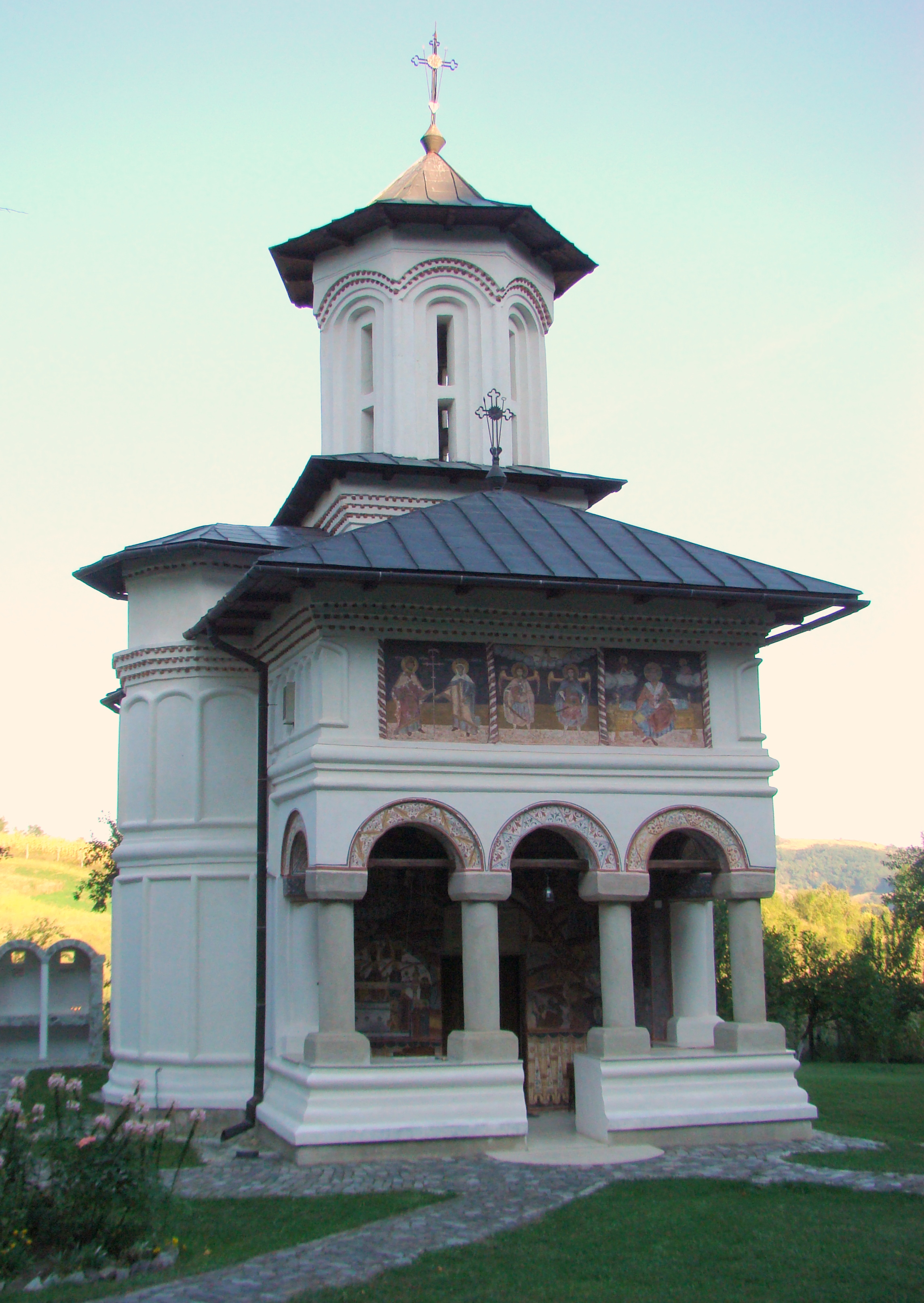
- Church of Saints Joachim and Ana in Logrești, 2015

- Location in Romania
- Coordinates: 44°54′N 23°42′E
- Country: Romania
- County: Gorj
- Subdivisions: Colțești, Frunza, Logrești-Moșteni, Măru, Popești, Seaca, Târgu Logrești

Government
  - Mayor (2020–2024): Mihai Vochița (PNL)
- Area: 68.15 km^{2} (26.31 sq mi)
- Population (2021-12-01): 2,341
  - Density: 34.35/km^{2} (88.97/sq mi)
- Time zone: UTC+02:00 (EET)
  - Summer (DST): UTC+03:00 (EEST)
- Vehicle reg.: GJ

Logrești is a commune in Gorj County, Oltenia, Romania. It is composed of seven villages: Colțești, Frunza, Logrești-Moșteni, Măru, Popești, Seaca and Târgu Logrești (the commune centre).
