= Hurezani =

- Commune
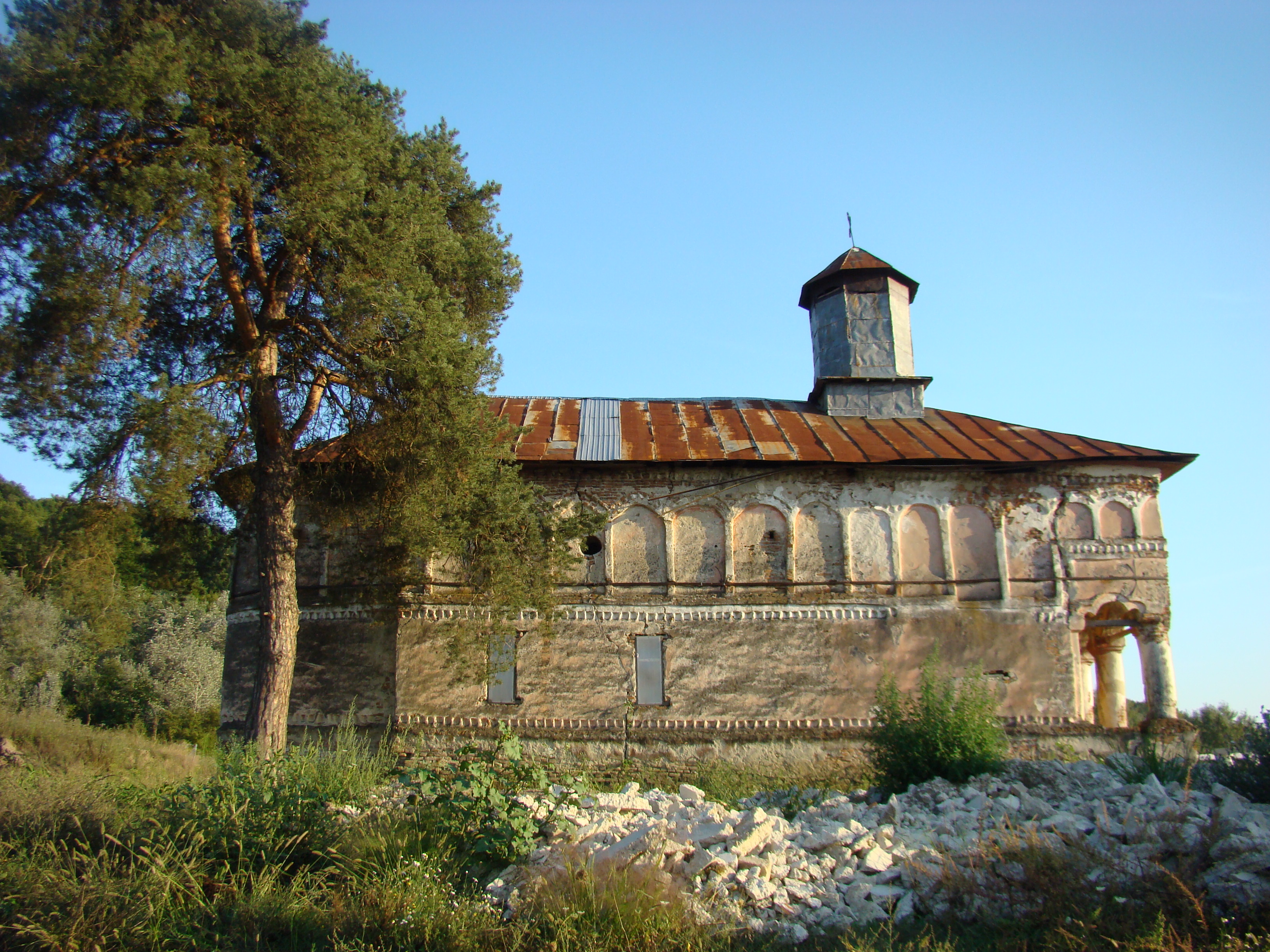
- Saint Demetrius' Church in Hurezani

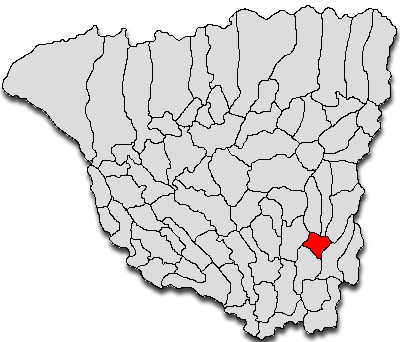
- Location in Gorj County

- Location in Romania
- Coordinates: 44°48′N 23°39′E
- Country: Romania
- County: Gorj
- Subdivisions: Busuioci, Hurezani, Pegeni, Plopu, Totea de Hurezani

Government
  - Mayor (2020–2024): Ion Mîndruț (PNL)
- Area: 37.28 km^{2} (14.39 sq mi)
- Elevation: 229 m (751 ft)
- Population (2021-12-01): 1,549
  - Density: 41.55/km^{2} (107.6/sq mi)
- Time zone: UTC+02:00 (EET)
  - Summer (DST): UTC+03:00 (EEST)
- Postal code: 217260
- Area code: +(40) x53
- Vehicle reg.: GJ
- Website: hurezani.eccompany.ro

Hurezani is a commune in Gorj County, Oltenia, Romania. It is composed of five villages: Busuioci, Hurezani, Pegeni, Plopu, and Totea de Hurezani.

The commune is located in the southeastern part of Gorj County, 50 km (31 mi) from the country seat, Târgu Jiu. It is crossed by national road DN6B, which connects it to Craiova, 58 km (36 mi) to the south.
