= Brăduleț =

- Commune
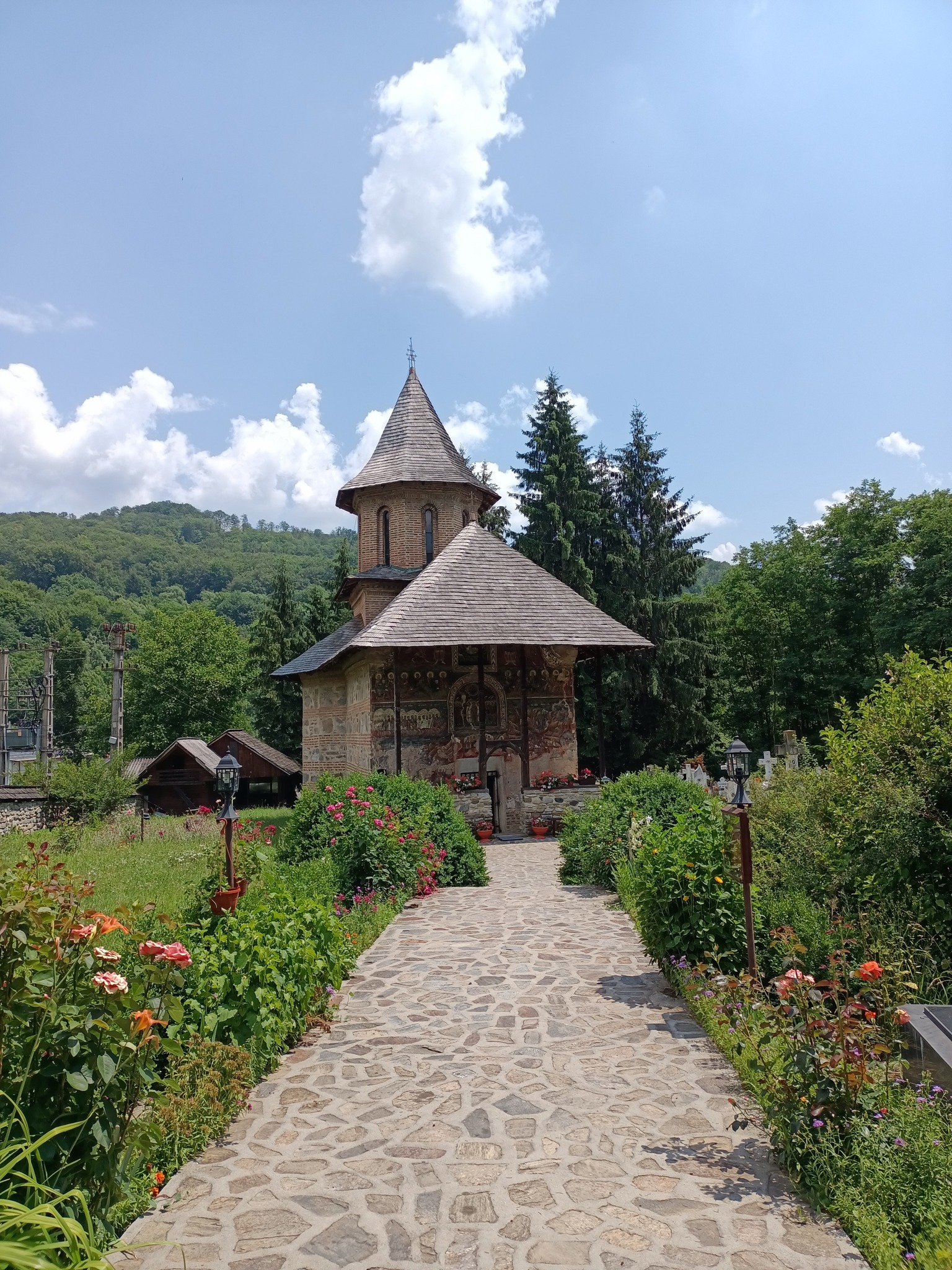
- Church in Brădetu

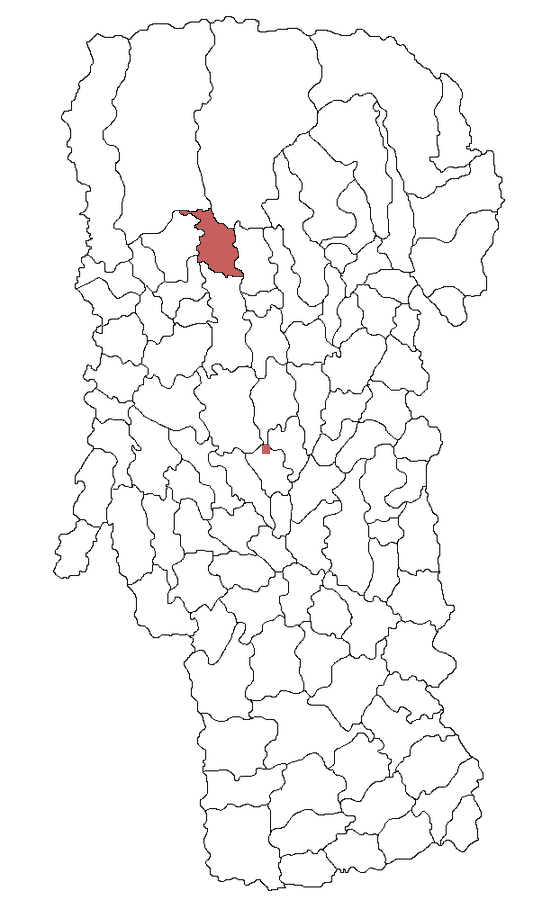
- Location in Argeș County

- Location in Romania
- Coordinates: 45°17′N 24°46′E
- Country: Romania
- County: Argeș

Government
  - Mayor (2024–2028): Florin Iordache (PSD)
- Area: 48.52 km^{2} (18.73 sq mi)
- Elevation: 681 m (2,234 ft)
- Population (2021-12-01): 1,578
  - Density: 32.52/km^{2} (84.23/sq mi)
- Time zone: UTC+02:00 (EET)
  - Summer (DST): UTC+03:00 (EEST)
- Postal code: 117145
- Area code: +(40) 0248
- Vehicle reg.: AG
- Website: www.cjarges.ro/en/web/bradulet/

Brăduleț, formerly Brătieni, is a commune in Argeș County, Muntenia, Romania. It is composed of nine villages: Alunișu, Brădetu, Brăduleț, Cosaci, Galeșu, Piatra, Slămnești, Uleni, and Ungureni.

Historical population
Year	Pop.	±%
1992	2,384	—
2002	2,149	−9.9%
2011	1,867	−13.1%
2021	1,578	−15.5%
Source: Census data
