= Crușeț =

- Commune
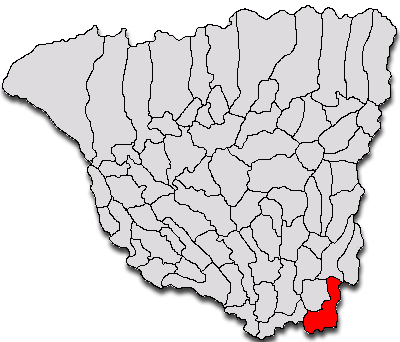
- Location in Gorj County

- Location in Romania
- Coordinates: 44°38′N 23°40′E
- Country: Romania
- County: Gorj
- Subdivisions: Bojinu, Crușeț, Marinești, Măiag, Mierea, Miericeaua, Slămnești, Slăvuța, Urda de Jos, Văluța
- Population (2021-12-01): 3,048
- Time zone: EET/EEST (UTC+2/+3)
- Vehicle reg.: GJ

Crușeț is a commune in Gorj County, Oltenia, Romania. It is composed of ten villages: Bojinu, Crușeț, Marinești, Măiag, Mierea, Miericeaua, Slămnești, Slăvuța, Urda de Jos and Văluța.
