= Roșia de Amaradia =

- Commune
- Location in Romania
- Coordinates: 45°03′N 23°45′E
- Country: Romania
- County: Gorj
- Subdivisions: Becheni, Dealu Viei, Roșia de Amaradia, Ruget, Seciurile, Stejaru, Șitoaia
- Area: 41.9 km^{2} (16.2 sq mi)
- Population (2021-12-01): 3,083
  - Density: 73.6/km^{2} (191/sq mi)
- Time zone: UTC+02:00 (EET)
  - Summer (DST): UTC+03:00 (EEST)
- Vehicle reg.: GJ

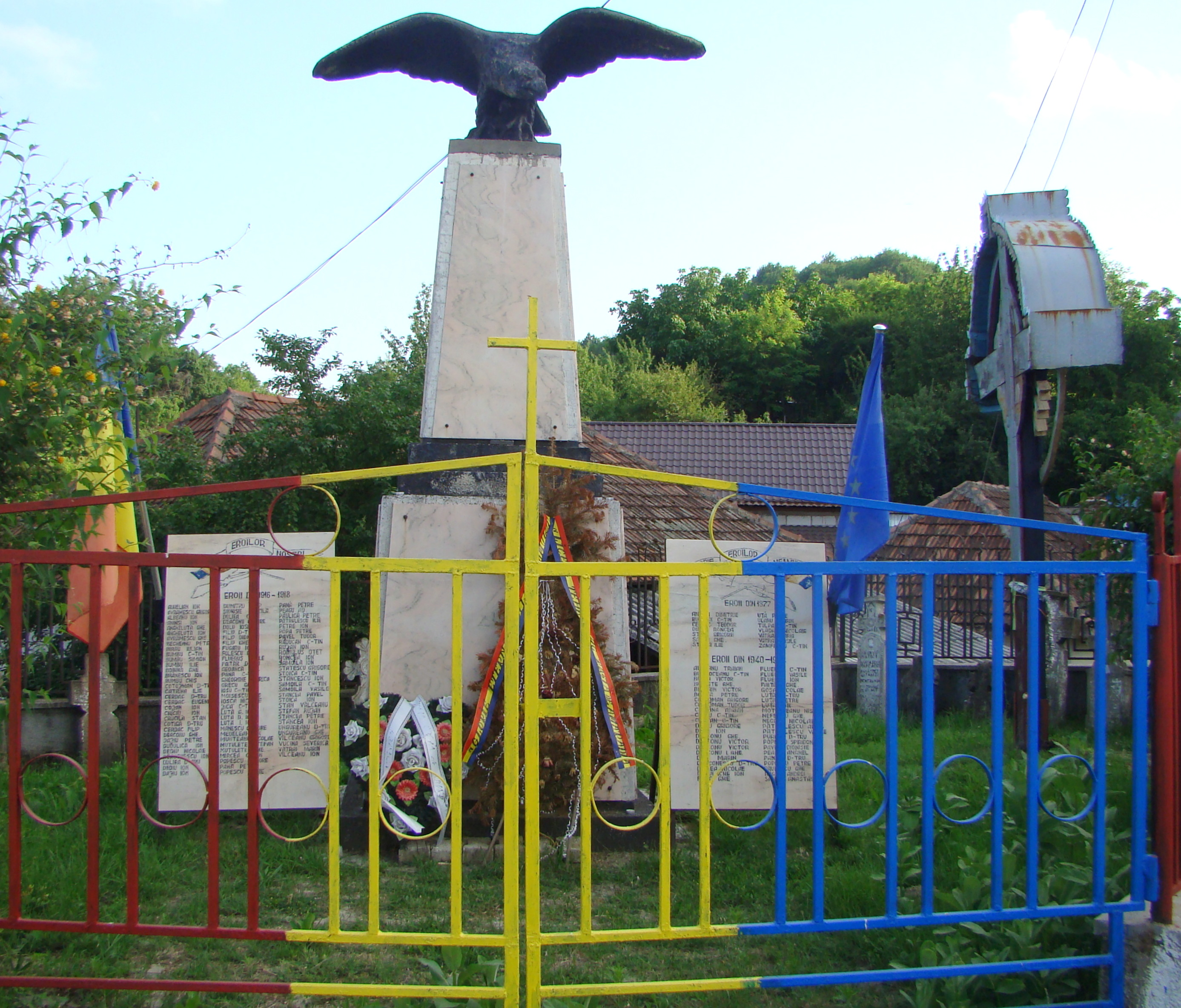

Roșia de Amaradia is a commune in Gorj County, Oltenia, Romania. It is composed of seven villages: Becheni, Dealu Viei, Roșia de Amaradia, Ruget, Seciurile, Stejaru and Șitoaia.
